= Drake singles discography =

Singles recorded by Canadian rapper

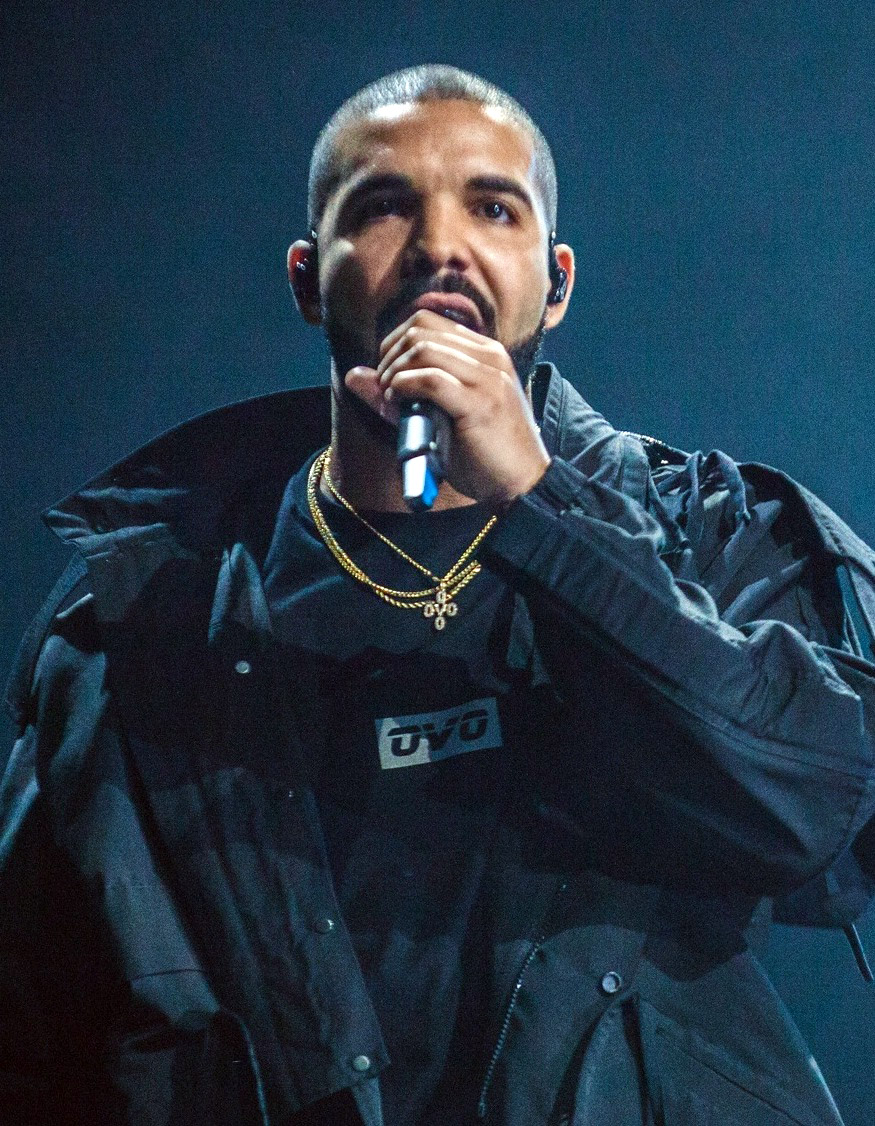
- Drake performing at his Summer Sixteen Tour in Toronto; 2016
- Singles: 190
- Promotional singles: 6

Canadian rapper and singer Drake has released 189 singles (including 106 as a featured artist) and six promotional singles. His music has been released on record labels Universal Motown Records and Republic Records, along with subsidiaries Young Money Entertainment, Cash Money Records and OVO Sound. With 170 million records sold worldwide, he is among the best-selling music artists in history. Drake has achieved thirteen number-one hits on the Billboard Hot 100. Billboard hailed him as the "Artist of the 2010s Decade" and the 16th Greatest Artist of all time. RIAA ranks him as the top-selling digital artist of all time with 350 million in the United States. He has the most number one singles on both the US Hot Rap Songs chart (with thirty) and the US Hot R&B/Hip-Hop Songs chart (also with thirty).

Following him signing to Young Money Entertainment imprint, Drake's mixtape, So Far Gone was repackaged as a 2009 release of his seven-song extended play, containing three singles: "Best I Ever Had", "Successful", and "I'm Goin' In". These singles peaked at numbers 2, 17, and 40 on the US Billboard Hot 100, respectively. In June 2010, Drake released his debut studio album, Thank Me Later, which featured the single, "Find Your Love", peaking at number 5 on the Billboard Hot 100.

In November 2011, Drake released his second studio album, Take Care, which produced singles such as "Marvins Room", "Headlines", "Make Me Proud", "The Motto", "Take Care", "HYFR (Hell Ya Fucking Right)", "Crew Love", and "Lord Knows", four of which reached the top 15 of the Billboard Hot 100 and were certified platinum by the RIAA (RIAA). "Take Care" became the most commercially successful single from the album in many overseas territories such as Australia, where it was certified double platinum by the Australian Recording Industry Association (ARIA), Ireland and the United Kingdom. In September 2013, Drake released his third studio album, Nothing Was the Same, which produced two of his top 10 singles "Started from the Bottom" and "Hold On, We're Going Home".

Drake's fourth studio album Views was released in April 2016, and included the singles "Hotline Bling", "One Dance", "Pop Style", "Controlla", and "Too Good", all of which peaked within the top 20 on the Billboard Hot 100 chart. "One Dance" became the most successful single of Drake's career, becoming an international hit and peaking at number one in fifteen countries, including Canada, the US, and the UK, where it became his first number-one single. "One Dance" has since also become the third most played song on streaming media service Spotify, with over two billion individual streams.

Drake's fifth studio album, Scorpion, was released in June 2018; all 25 tracks on the album entered the Billboard Hot 100. The album was supported by six singles, including the number-one singles "God's Plan", "Nice for What", and "In My Feelings". In August 2018, Drake was featured on Travis Scott's single, "Sicko Mode", which reached number one on the Hot 100 four months later, but he was not credited as a featured artist. He released his seventh mixtape Dark Lane Demo Tapes, in May 2020, which spawned his seventh Hot 100 number-one single, "Toosie Slide". In March 2021, he released the extended play Scary Hours 2, which included his eighth Hot 100 chart-topper, "What's Next". In September 2021, Drake released his sixth studio album, Certified Lover Boy, in which he got his ninth number-one single on the Hot 100 with "Way 2 Sexy", which features Future and Young Thug. In May 2022, he was featured alongside Tems on Future's single, "Wait for U", which became his tenth number-one single. In June 2022, Drake released his seventh studio album, Honestly, Nevermind, from which he achieved his eleventh number-one single on the Hot 100 with "Jimmy Cooks", which features 21 Savage. In October 2023, Drake released his eighth studio album, For All the Dogs, from which he earned his twelfth and thirteenth number-one singles on the Hot 100 with "Slime You Out" and "First Person Shooter", which feature SZA and J. Cole, respectively.

== As lead artist ==
=== 2000s ===
List of singles released in the 2000s decade, with selected chart positions, certifications, and associated albums
Title	Year	Peak chart positions										Certifications	Album
Title	Year	CAN	AUS	FRA	IRE	NZ	SWE	UK	US	US R&B /HH	US Rap	Certifications	Album
"Do What You Do"	2005	—	—	—	—	—	—	—	—	—	—		Room for Improvement
"Inst"	2006	—	—	—	—	—	—	—	—	—	—		Non-album single
"City Is Mine"	2006	—	—	—	—	—	—	—	—	—	—		Room for Improvement
"Replacement Girl" (featuring Trey Songz)	2007	—	—	—	—	—	—	—	—	—	—		Comeback Season
"Best I Ever Had"	2009	24	—	—	—	—	—	123	2	1	1	ARIA: 2× Platinum; BPI: Platinum; RIAA: Diamond	So Far Gone (mixtape)
"Successful" (featuring Trey Songz and Lil Wayne)	2009	—	—	—	—	—	—	—	17	3	2	RIAA: Platinum	So Far Gone (mixtape)
"I'm Goin' In" (featuring Lil Wayne and Jeezy)	2009	—	—	—	—	—	—	—	40	28	11	RIAA: Platinum	So Far Gone (EP)
"Forever" (with Kanye West, Lil Wayne, and Eminem)	2009	26	99	—	41	—	—	42	8	2	1	ARIA: 2× Platinum; IFPI DEN: Gold; BPI: Platinum; RIAA: 6× Platinum	More than a Game and Relapse: Refill
"—" denotes a recording that did not chart or was not released in that territory.

=== 2010s ===
List of singles released in the 2010s decade, with selected chart positions, certifications, and associated albums
Title	Year	Peak chart positions										Certifications	Album
Title	Year	CAN	AUS	DEN	FRA	IRE	NZ	SWE	UK	US	US R&B /HH	Certifications	Album
"Over"	2010	17	—	—	—	—	—	—	50	14	2	ARIA: Gold; BPI: Gold; RIAA: 3× Platinum	Thank Me Later
"Find Your Love"	2010	10	—	—	—	—	—	—	24	5	3	ARIA: Gold; BPI: Gold; RIAA: 3× Platinum	Thank Me Later
"Miss Me" (featuring Lil Wayne)	2010	73	—	—	—	—	—	—	—	15	3	RIAA: Platinum	Thank Me Later
"Fancy" (featuring T.I. and Swizz Beatz)	2010	54	—	—	—	—	—	—	—	25	4	RIAA: Platinum; RMNZ: Platinum	Thank Me Later
"Marvins Room"	2011	—	—	—	—	—	—	—	—	21	7	ARIA: 2× Platinum; IFPI DEN: Gold; BPI: Platinum; RIAA: Diamond	Take Care
"Headlines"	2011	18	—	—	75	—	—	88	57	13	2	MC: Platinum; ARIA: 2× Platinum; IFPI DEN: Gold; BPI: 2× Platinum; RIAA: Diamond	Take Care
"Make Me Proud" (featuring Nicki Minaj)	2011	25	95	—	—	—	—	—	49	9	1	ARIA: Platinum; BPI: Silver; RIAA: Platinum	Take Care
"The Motto" (featuring Lil Wayne)	2011	38	—	—	—	—	—	—	80	14	1	ARIA: 2× Platinum; BPI: Platinum; RIAA: Diamond	Take Care
"Take Care" (featuring Rihanna)	2012	15	9	8	26	18	7	49	9	7	26	MC: 2× Platinum; ARIA: 7× Platinum; IFPI DEN: Gold; BPI: 2× Platinum; RIAA: 7× Platinum; RMNZ: Platinum	Take Care
"HYFR (Hell Ya Fucking Right)" (featuring Lil Wayne)	2012	—	—	—	—	—	—	—	—	62	20	ARIA: Gold; BPI: Silver; RIAA: 2× Platinum	Take Care
"Crew Love" (featuring the Weeknd)	2012	80	—	—	—	—	—	—	37	80	9	ARIA: Platinum; BPI: Platinum; RIAA: Platinum	Take Care
"Started from the Bottom"	2013	36	93	—	56	—	—	—	25	6	2	MC: Platinum; ARIA: 3× Platinum; BPI: Platinum; RIAA: 8× Platinum	Nothing Was the Same
"Hold On, We're Going Home" (featuring Majid Jordan)	2013	5	8	4	12	7	9	22	4	4	1	MC: Platinum; ARIA: 8× Platinum; IFPI DEN: 2× Platinum; RMNZ: 5× Platinum; GLF: 2× Platinum; BPI: 3× Platinum; RIAA: Diamond	Nothing Was the Same
"All Me" (featuring Big Sean and 2 Chainz)	2013	72	—	—	141	—	—	—	—	20	6	ARIA: Gold; BPI: Silver; RIAA: 2× Platinum	Nothing Was the Same
"Pound Cake / Paris Morton Music 2" (featuring Jay-Z)	2013	88	—	—	—	—	—	—	—	65	24	ARIA: Platinum; BPI: Gold; RIAA: Platinum	Nothing Was the Same
"The Language"	2013	—	—	—	—	—	—	—	—	51	13	RIAA: Platinum; BPI: Silver	Nothing Was the Same
"Too Much" (featuring Sampha)	2013	90	—	—	—	—	—	—	86	64	23	ARIA: Gold; BPI: Silver; RIAA: Platinum	Nothing Was the Same
"Worst Behavior"	2014	—	—	—	—	—	—	—	—	89	29	ARIA: Gold; BPI: Silver; RIAA: Platinum	Nothing Was the Same
"0 to 100 / The Catch Up"	2014	59	—	—	—	—	—	—	68	35	8	ARIA: 2× Platinum; IFPI DEN: Gold; BPI: Gold; RIAA: 2× Platinum	Non-album single
"Preach" (featuring PartyNextDoor)	2015	66	—	—	—	—	—	—	53	82	27	ARIA: Gold; BPI: Silver	If You're Reading This It's Too Late
"Energy"	2015	53	59	—	196	—	—	—	71	26	9	ARIA: 2× Platinum; IFPI DEN: Gold; BPI: Gold; RIAA: 5× Platinum	If You're Reading This It's Too Late
"Charged Up"	2015	75	—	—	—	—	—	—	—	78	21		Non-album singles
"Back to Back"	2015	27	—	—	152	—	—	—	77	21	8	ARIA: Platinum; BPI: Gold; RIAA: 2× Platinum	Non-album singles
"Hotline Bling"	2015	3	2	5	9	8	14	12	3	2	1	MC: Platinum; ARIA: 8× Platinum; IFPI DEN: 2× Platinum; RMNZ: Gold; GLF: 3× Platinum; BPI: 2× Platinum; RIAA: Diamond; SNEP: Platinum	Views
"Right Hand"	2015	72	—	—	—	—	—	—	81	58	19	ARIA: Platinum; BPI: Silver; RIAA: Platinum	Non-album single
"Jumpman" (with Future)	2015	44	47	—	90	77	— (Note: "Jumpman" did not enter the NZ Top 40 Singles Chart, but peaked at number four on the NZ Heatseeker chart.)	—	58	12	3	MC: Gold; ARIA: 3× Platinum; IFPI DEN: Gold; BPI: Platinum; RIAA: 5× Platinum; RMNZ: Gold	What a Time to Be Alive
"Summer Sixteen"	2016	12	25	—	24	71	— (Note: "Summer Sixteen" did not enter the NZ Top 40 Singles Chart, but peaked at number six on the NZ Heatseeker chart.)	98	23	6	1	ARIA: Gold; BPI: Silver; RIAA: Platinum	Non-album single
"One Dance" (featuring Wizkid and Kyla)	2016	1	1	2	1	1	1	1	1	1	1	MC: Diamond; ARIA: 17× Platinum; GLF: 7× Platinum; BPI: 7× Platinum; RIAA: 15× Platinum; RMNZ: 2× Platinum; SNEP: Diamond	Views
"Pop Style" (featuring The Throne)	2016	19	44	—	29	58	— (Note: "Pop Style" did not enter the NZ Top 40 Singles Chart, but peaked at number seven on the NZ Heatseeker chart.)	—	33	16	4	ARIA: Platinum; BPI: Gold; RIAA: 2× Platinum	Views
"Controlla"	2016	27	46	—	58	41	27	69	18	16	5	MC: 2× Platinum; ARIA: 3× Platinum; GLF: Platinum; BPI: 2× Platinum; RIAA: 5× Platinum; SNEP: Gold	Views
"Too Good" (featuring Rihanna)	2016	9	3	14	29	7	4	13	3	14	3	MC: 4× Platinum; ARIA: 6× Platinum; GLF: 3× Platinum; BPI: 2× Platinum; RIAA: 5× Platinum; RMNZ: Platinum; SNEP: Platinum	Views
"Fake Love"	2016	10	16	14	79	18	— (Note: "Fake Love" did not enter the NZ Top 40 Singles Chart, but peaked at number three on the NZ Heatseeker Singles Chart.)	31	10	8	4	ARIA: 4× Platinum; BPI: Platinum; RIAA: 6× Platinum; SNEP: Gold	More Life
"Sneakin'" (featuring 21 Savage)	2016	20	81	—	180	80	—	—	52	28	8	ARIA: Gold; BPI: Silver; RIAA: Platinum	Non-album singles
"Two Birds, One Stone"	2016	64	—	—	—	—	—	—	—	73	31		Non-album singles
"No Frauds" (with Nicki Minaj and Lil Wayne)	2017	25	58	—	148	71	— (Note: "No Frauds" did not enter the NZ Top 40 Singles Chart, but peaked at number three on the NZ Heatseeker Singles Chart.)	94	49	14	8	MC: Gold; ARIA: Platinum; BPI: Silver	Non-album singles
"Passionfruit"	2017	2	4	5	7	4	2	7	3	8	5	ARIA: 7× Platinum; BPI: 4× Platinum; BVMI: Gold; RIAA: Diamond; RMNZ: Gold; SNEP: Platinum	More Life
"Free Smoke"	2017	12	—	—	93	36	— (Note: "Free Smoke" did not enter the NZ Top 40 Singles Chart, but peaked at number two on the NZ Heatseeker Singles Chart.)	69	36	18	11	ARIA: Gold; BPI: Silver; RIAA: Platinum	More Life
"Portland" (featuring Quavo and Travis Scott)	2017	6	—	—	84	38	38	73	27	9	6	ARIA: 2× Platinum; BPI: Platinum; RIAA: 2× Platinum	More Life
"Glow" (featuring Kanye West)	2017	37	—	—	—	65	—	—	55	54	30		More Life
"Signs"	2017	12	32	19	59	27	36	26	14	36	14	MC: 2× Platinum; ARIA: Platinum; GLF: Gold; BPI: Platinum; RIAA: Platinum; SNEP: Gold	Non-album single
"God's Plan"	2018	1	1	1	2	1	1	1	1	1	1	MC: 8× Platinum; ARIA: 12× Platinum; GLF: Platinum; BPI: 5× Platinum; RIAA: 2x Diamond; RMNZ: 2× Platinum; SNEP: Diamond	Scorpion
"Nice for What"	2018	1	1	3	26	2	1	4	1	1	1	MC: 4× Platinum; ARIA: 8× Platinum; GLF: Platinum; BPI: 4× Platinum; RIAA: Diamond; RMNZ: Platinum; SNEP: Platinum	Scorpion
"Yes Indeed" (with Lil Baby)	2018	7	68	—	—	65	— (Note: "Yes Indeed" did not enter the NZ Top 40 Singles Chart, but peaked at number one on the NZ Heatseeker Singles Chart.)	91	46	6	5	MC: 2× Platinum; BPI: Platinum; RIAA: 7× Platinum	Harder Than Ever
"I'm Upset"	2018	5	17	—	82	54	13	51	37	7	6	MC: Platinum; ARIA: Platinum; BPI: Gold; RIAA: 3× Platinum	Scorpion
"Don't Matter to Me" (with Michael Jackson)	2018	4	3	2	24	3	6	1	2	9	8	MC: Gold; ARIA: 2× Platinum; BPI: Platinum; GLF: Platinum; SNEP: Gold	Scorpion
"In My Feelings"	2018	1	1	1	3	2	1	1	1	1	1	MC: 5× Platinum; ARIA: 7× Platinum; BPI: 3× Platinum; GLF: Platinum; RIAA: Diamond; RMNZ: Platinum; SNEP: Diamond	Scorpion
"Nonstop"	2018	1	5	19	34	5	8	17	4	2	2	MC: Platinum; ARIA: 5× Platinum; BPI: Platinum; RIAA: Diamond; SNEP: Gold	Scorpion
"Mob Ties"	2019	11	28	—	85	92	—	61	— (Note: "Mob Ties" did not enter the UK Singles Chart, as chart rules only allow three songs per artist to chart within the top one hundred at a time, but peaked at number 13 on the UK Streaming Chart.)	13	12	MC: Gold; ARIA: Platinum; BPI: Gold	Scorpion
"Girls Need Love (Remix)" (with Summer Walker)	2019	45	78	—	—	70	— (Note: "Girls Need Love (Remix)" did not enter the NZ Top 40 Singles Chart, but peaked at number eight on the NZ Hot Singles Chart.)	—	41	37	16	MC: Platinum; ARIA: 3× Platinum; BPI: 2× Platinum	Last Day of Summer
"Omertà"	2019	8	69	—	—	44	— (Note: "Omertà" did not enter the NZ Top 40 Singles Chart, but peaked at number 12 on the NZ Hot Singles Chart.)	—	33	35	14		The Best in the World Pack
"Money in the Grave" (featuring Rick Ross)	2019	5	7	29	113	18	7	68	13	7	3	ARIA: 4× Platinum; BPI: Platinum; RMNZ: Gold; SNEP: Gold; RIAA: 6× Platinum	The Best in the World Pack
"—" denotes a recording that did not chart or was not released in that territory.

=== 2020s ===
List of singles released in the 2020s decade, with selected chart positions, certifications, and associated albums
Title	Year	Peak chart positions										Certifications	Album
Title	Year	CAN	AUS	DEN	FRA	IRE	NZ	SWE	UK	US	WW	Certifications	Album
"Toosie Slide"	2020	2	3	1	4	1	1	3	1	1	73	MC: 4× Platinum; ARIA: 4× Platinum; BPI: Platinum; RMNZ: 2× Platinum; SNEP: Gold	Dark Lane Demo Tapes
"Only You Freestyle" (with Headie One)	2020	37	51	—	—	13	—	—	5	— (Note: "Only You Freestyle" did not enter the Billboard Hot 100, but peaked at number 18 on the Bubbling Under Hot 100 chart.)	—	MC: Gold; BPI: Platinum; RMNZ: Gold	Edna
"Laugh Now Cry Later" (featuring Lil Durk)	2020	1	3	20	50	5	3	14	4	2	5	MC: 4× Platinum; ARIA: 3× Platinum; BPI: Platinum; RIAA: 6× Platinum; RMNZ: 3× Platinum	Non-album single
"What's Next"	2021	1	7	34	74	7	12	77	4	1	1	MC: Platinum; ARIA: Platinum; BPI: Silver; RMNZ: Gold	Scary Hours 2
"Way 2 Sexy" (featuring Future and Young Thug)	2021	3	7	16	28	15	7	25	11	1	2	ARIA: Platinum; BPI: Gold; RIAA: 4× Platinum; RMNZ: Platinum	Certified Lover Boy
"Girls Want Girls" (featuring Lil Baby)	2021	8	2	4	12	3	11	11	2	2	3	ARIA: 2× Platinum; BPI: Platinum; RIAA: 3× Platinum; RMNZ: Platinum	Certified Lover Boy
"Bubbly" (with Young Thug and Travis Scott)	2021	22	88	—	—	64	— (Note: "Bubbly" did not enter the NZ Top 40 Singles Chart, but peaked at number five on the NZ Hot Singles Chart.)	—	60	20	25		Punk
"Knife Talk" (with 21 Savage featuring Project Pat)	2021	6	13	—	83	55	14	74	—	4	6	ARIA: 2× Platinum; BPI: Gold; RIAA: 8× Platinum; RMNZ: 2× Platinum	Certified Lover Boy
"Sticky"	2022	3	15	—	111	27	10	60	30	6	8	ARIA: Platinum; BPI: Silver; RIAA: Platinum; RMNZ: Gold	Honestly, Nevermind
"Massive"	2022	8	12	—	102	5	15	73	8	14	10	ARIA: Platinum; BPI: Platinum; RMNZ: Gold	Honestly, Nevermind
"Jimmy Cooks" (featuring 21 Savage)	2022	1	4	34	98	9	3	45	7	1	3	ARIA: 4× Platinum; BPI: Platinum; RIAA: 3× Platinum; RMNZ: 3× Platinum; SNEP: Gold	Honestly, Nevermind
"Rich Flex" (with 21 Savage)	2022	1	3	12	74	3	2	16	3	2	1	ARIA: 3× Platinum; BPI: Platinum; RIAA: 5× Platinum; RMNZ: 2× Platinum	Her Loss
"Circo Loco" (with 21 Savage)	2022	5	9	—	126	7	35	55	7	8	8	ARIA: Platinum; RIAA: Platinum; RMNZ: Gold	Her Loss
"Spin Bout U" (with 21 Savage)	2023	9	55	—	150	—	—	77	— (Note: "Spin Bout U" did not enter the UK Singles Chart, as chart rules only allow three songs per artist to chart within the top 100 at a time, but peaked at number 16 on the UK Streaming Chart.)	5	7	ARIA: Platinum; BPI: Silver; RMNZ: Platinum	Her Loss
"Search & Rescue"	2023	4	8	40	118	6	11	53	5	2	2	ARIA: Platinum; RMNZ: Gold	Non-album singles
"On the Radar Freestyle" (with Central Cee)	2023	45	89	—	—	42	— (Note: "On the Radar Freestyle" did not enter the NZ Top 40 Singles Chart, but peaked at number nine on the NZ Hot Singles Chart.)	—	26	80	106		Non-album singles
"Slime You Out" (featuring SZA)	2023	2	12	21	77	13	9	26	10	1	3	ARIA: Gold; BPI: Silver; RIAA: 2× Platinum; RMNZ: Gold	For All the Dogs
"8AM in Charlotte"	2023	13	60	—	149	—	30	— (Note: "8AM in Charlotte" did not enter the Swedish Singellista Chart, but peaked at number 13 on the Swedish Heatseeker Chart.)	— (Note: "8AM in Charlotte" did not enter the UK Singles Chart, as chart rules only allow three songs per artist to chart within the top one hundred at a time, but peaked at number 27 on the UK Streaming Chart.)	17	21		For All the Dogs
"Rich Baby Daddy" (featuring Sexyy Red and SZA)	2023	18	11	—	152	20	9	— (Note: "Rich Baby Daddy" did not enter the Swedish Singellista Chart, but peaked at number one on the Swedish Heatseeker Chart.)	10	11	16	MC: 2× Platinum; ARIA: Platinum; BPI: Platinum; RIAA: 3× Platinum; RMNZ: 2× Platinum	For All the Dogs
"First Person Shooter" (featuring J. Cole)	2023	1	4	22	52	7	5	42	4	1	2	ARIA: Gold; BPI: Silver; RIAA: 2× Platinum; RMNZ: Gold	For All the Dogs
"You Broke My Heart"	2023	8	—	—	—	48	— (Note: "You Broke My Heart" did not enter the NZ Top 40 Singles Chart, but peaked at number four on the NZ Hot Singles Chart.)	— (Note: "You Broke My Heart" did not enter the Swedish Singellista Chart, but peaked at number 18 on the Swedish Heatseeker Chart.)	26	11	21	RIAA: Platinum; RMNZ: Gold	For All the Dogs Scary Hours Edition
"Push Ups"	2024	10	37	36	—	20	34	54	14	17	20		Non-album singles
"Family Matters"	2024	6	26	—	—	21	16	59	17	7	11		Non-album singles
"U My Everything" (with Sexyy Red)	2024	70	—	—	—	—	— (Note: "U My Everything" did not enter the NZ Top 40 Singles Chart, but peaked at number six on the NZ Hot Singles Chart.)	—	—	44	132		In Sexyy We Trust
"Gimme a Hug"	2025	10	44	—	—	54	— (Note: "Gimme a Hug" did not enter the NZ Top 40 Singles Chart, but peaked at number three on the NZ Hot Singles Chart.)	— (Note: "Gimme a Hug" did not enter the Swedish Singellista Chart, but peaked at number 19 on the Swedish Heatseeker Chart.)	21	6	18	RIAA: Gold	Some Sexy Songs 4 U
"Nokia"	2025	5	5	—	—	20	4	— (Note: "Nokia" did not enter the Swedish Singellista Chart, but peaked at number nine on the Swedish Heatseeker Chart.)	10	2	8	BPI: Silver; RIAA: 3× Platinum; RMNZ: Platinum	Some Sexy Songs 4 U
"Somebody Loves Me" (with PartyNextDoor or remix also with Cash Cobain)	2025	27	97	—	—	—	—	—	—	27	43	RIAA: Platinum	Some Sexy Songs 4 U
"Die Trying" (with PartyNextDoor and Yebba)	2025	14	40	—	—	51	— (Note: "Die Trying" did not enter the NZ Top 40 Singles Chart, but peaked at number four on the NZ Hot Singles Chart.)	— (Note: "Die Trying" did not enter the Swedish Singellista Chart, but peaked at number eight on the Swedish Heatseeker Chart.)	42	21	32	RIAA: Platinum; RMNZ: Platinum	Some Sexy Songs 4 U
"What Did I Miss?"	2025	2	37	—	—	47	29	75	27	2	9		Iceman
"Which One" (with Central Cee)	2025	4	16	35	—	12	18	62	4	23	14	ARIA: Gold; BPI: Silver; RMNZ: Gold	Maid of Honour
"Dog House" (featuring Julia Wolf and Yeat)	2025	39	—	—	—	—	— (Note: "Dog House" did not enter the NZ Top 40 Singles Chart, but peaked at number 14 on the NZ Hot Singles Chart.)	—	54	53	116		Non-album single
"2 Hard 4 the Radio"	2026	6	15	32	—	—	18	32	—	9	9		Iceman
"Janice STFU"	2026	1	5	20	65	5	5	12	2	1	1		Iceman
"Shabang"	2026	4	13	—	152	80	9	43	25	4	5		Iceman
"—" denotes a recording that did not chart or was not released in that territory.

== As featured artist ==
=== 2000s ===
List of singles released in the 2000s decade as featured artist, with selected chart positions, certifications, and associated albums
Title	Year	Peak chart positions										Certifications	Album
Title	Year	CAN	AUS	DEN	FRA	IRE	NZ	SWE	UK	US	US R&B /HH	Certifications	Album
"The One" (Mary J. Blige featuring Drake)	2009	83	—	—	—	—	—	—	—	63	32		Stronger with Each Tear
"Digital Girl (Remix)" (Jamie Foxx featuring Drake, Kanye West, and The-Dream)	2009	—	—	—	—	—	—	—	—	92	37		Intuition
"Money to Blow" (Birdman featuring Drake and Lil Wayne)	2009	—	—	—	—	—	—	—	—	26	2	RIAA: Platinum	Priceless
"Fed Up" (DJ Khaled featuring Usher, Drake, Young Jeezy, and Rick Ross)	2009	—	—	—	—	—	—	—	—	— (Note: "Fed Up" did not enter the Billboard Hot 100, but peaked at number eight on the Bubbling Under Hot 100 Singles chart.)	45		Victory
"Say Something" (Timbaland featuring Drake)	2009	—	—	—	—	—	—	—	—	23	1		Shock Value II
"I Invented Sex" (Trey Songz featuring Drake)	2009	—	—	—	—	—	—	—	—	42	1		Ready
"4 My Town (Play Ball)" (Birdman featuring Drake and Lil Wayne)	2009	—	—	—	—	—	—	—	—	90	37		Priceless
"—" denotes a recording that did not chart or was not released in that territory.

=== 2010s ===
List of singles released in the 2010s decade as featured artist, with selected chart positions, certifications, and associated albums
Title	Year	Peak chart positions										Certifications	Album
Title	Year	CAN	AUS	DEN	FRA	IRE	NZ	SWE	UK	US	US R&B /HH	Certifications	Album
"You Got Me" (Sacario featuring Drake)	2010	—	—	—	—	—	—	—	—	—	—		Sneak Attack
"Right Above It" (Lil Wayne featuring Drake)	2010	34	98	—	—	—	—	—	37	6	4	ARIA: Gold; BPI: Silver; RIAA: 5× Platinum	I Am Not a Human Being
"Aston Martin Music" (Rick Ross featuring Chrisette Michele and Drake)	2010	—	—	—	—	—	—	—	—	30	2	RIAA: 3× Platinum	Teflon Don
"Loving You No More" (Diddy – Dirty Money featuring Drake)	2010	—	—	—	—	—	—	—	—	91	20		Last Train to Paris
"What Up" (Pimp C featuring Drake and Bun B)	2010	—	—	—	—	—	—	—	—	—	—		The Naked Soul of Sweet Jones
"What's My Name?" (Rihanna featuring Drake)	2010	5	18	19	16	3	3	20	1	1	2	ARIA: 5× Platinum; GLF: Platinum; BPI: 2× Platinum; IFPI SWI: Gold; RIAA: 6× Platinum; RMNZ: Platinum	Loud
"Fall for Your Type" (Jamie Foxx featuring Drake)	2010	—	—	—	—	—	—	—	—	50	1		Best Night of My Life
"Moment 4 Life" (Nicki Minaj featuring Drake)	2010	27	—	—	65	37	—	—	22	13	1	ARIA: 2× Platinum; BPI: Platinum; RIAA: Platinum	Pink Friday
"Put It Down" (Bun B featuring Drake)	2010	—	—	—	—	—	—	—	—	—	81		Trill OG
"Celebration" (Tank featuring Drake)	2011	—	—	—	—	—	—	—	—	—	73		Now or Never
"Feel Love" (Sean Garrett featuring Drake)	2011	—	—	—	—	—	—	—	—	—	—		The Inkwell
"Unusual" (Trey Songz featuring Drake)	2011	—	—	—	—	—	—	—	—	68	7		Passion, Pain & Pleasure
"Poppin Bottles" (T.I. featuring Drake)	2011	—	—	—	—	—	—	—	—	— (Note: "Poppin Bottles" did not enter the Billboard Hot 100, but peaked at number 15 on the Bubbling Under Hot 100 chart.)	75		No Mercy
"I'm on One" (DJ Khaled featuring Drake, Rick Ross, and Lil Wayne)	2011	67	—	—	—	—	—	—	78	10	1	BPI: Gold; RIAA: 5× Platinum	We the Best Forever
"She Will" (Lil Wayne featuring Drake)	2011	16	78	—	70	—	—	—	58	3	1	RIAA: 4× Platinum; BPI: Silver	Tha Carter IV
"It's Good" (Lil Wayne featuring Jadakiss and Drake)	2011	—	—	—	—	—	—	—	—	79	—		Tha Carter IV
"Still Got It" (Tyga featuring Drake)	2011	—	—	—	—	—	—	—	—	89	70		Careless World: Rise of the Last King
"Round of Applause" (Waka Flocka Flame featuring Drake)	2011	—	—	—	—	—	—	—	—	86	15		Triple F Life: Friends, Fans and Family
"Mr. Wrong" (Mary J. Blige featuring Drake)	2011	—	—	—	—	—	—	—	—	87	10		My Life II... The Journey Continues (Act 1)
"So Good" (Shanell featuring Lil Wayne and Drake)	2011	—	—	—	—	—	—	—	—	—	—		Midnight Mimosas
"Stay Schemin'" (Rick Ross featuring Drake and French Montana)	2012	—	—	—	—	—	—	—	—	58	40	BPI: Gold	Rich Forever
"No Lie" (2 Chainz featuring Drake)	2012	—	—	—	—	—	—	—	—	24	1	RIAA: 3× Platinum	Based on a T.R.U. Story
"Pop That" (French Montana featuring Drake, Rick Ross, and Lil Wayne)	2012	—	—	—	—	—	—	—	—	36	2	RIAA: 2× Platinum	Excuse My French
"Amen" (Meek Mill featuring Drake)	2012	—	—	—	—	—	—	—	—	57	5	RIAA: Gold	Dreams and Nightmares
"Enough Said" (Aaliyah featuring Drake)	2012	—	—	—	—	—	—	—	—	—	55		Non-album single
"Diced Pineapples" (Rick Ross featuring Wale and Drake)	2012	—	—	—	—	—	—	—	—	71	16	RIAA: Platinum	God Forgives, I Don't
"Fuckin' Problems" (ASAP Rocky featuring Drake, 2 Chainz, and Kendrick Lamar)	2012	65	78	—	30	—	—	—	50	8	2	ARIA: 3× Platinum; IFPI DEN: Platinum; BPI: Platinum; RIAA: 8× Platinum	Long. Live. ASAP
"The Zone" (the Weeknd featuring Drake)	2012	—	—	—	—	—	—	—	—	—	—	ARIA: Gold; RIAA: Platinum	Trilogy
"Poetic Justice" (Kendrick Lamar featuring Drake)	2013	—	—	—	—	—	—	—	—	26	8	BPI: Silver; RIAA: 2× Platinum	Good Kid, M.A.A.D City
"Love Me" (Lil Wayne featuring Drake and Future)	2013	49	92	—	27	—	—	—	44	9	4	BPI: Silver; RIAA: Diamond; ARIA: Gold	I Am Not a Human Being II
"Right Here" (Justin Bieber featuring Drake)	2013	—	—	—	—	—	—	—	125	95	36	RIAA: Gold	Believe
"No New Friends" (DJ Khaled featuring Drake, Rick Ross, and Lil Wayne)	2013	—	—	—	—	—	—	—	106	37	9	RIAA: Platinum	Suffering from Success
"No Guns Allowed" (Snoop Lion featuring Drake and Cori B)	2013	—	—	—	—	—	—	—	—	—	— (Note: "No Guns Allowed" did not enter the Billboard Hot R&B/Hip-Hop Songs chart, but peaked at number eight on the Bubbling Under R&B/Hip-Hop Singles chart.)		Reincarnated
"Live For" (The Weeknd featuring Drake)	2013	—	—	—	—	—	—	—	111	— (Note: "Live For" did not enter the Billboard Hot 100, but peaked at number 19 on the Bubbling Under Hot 100 chart.)	47		Kiss Land
"Over Here" (PartyNextDoor featuring Drake)	2013	—	—	—	—	—	—	—	—	—	— (Note: "Over Here" did not enter the Billboard Hot R&B/Hip-Hop Songs chart, but peaked at number 47 on the Hot R&B/Hip-Hop Airplay chart.)		PartyNextDoor
"Know Bout Me" (Timbaland featuring Jay Z, Drake, and James Fauntleroy)	2013	—	24	—	—	—	—	—	—	—	— (Note: "Know Bout Me" did not enter the Billboard Hot R&B/Hip-Hop Songs chart, but peaked at number seven on the Bubbling Under R&B/Hip-Hop Singles chart.)		Non-album single
"Odio" (Romeo Santos featuring Drake)	2014	—	—	—	—	—	—	—	—	45	—	RIAA: 34× Platinum (Latin)	Formula, Vol. 2
"Who Do You Love?" (YG featuring Drake)	2014	—	—	—	197	—	—	—	87	54	15	RIAA: 2× Platinum	My Krazy Life
"Trophies" (Young Money featuring Drake)	2014	—	—	—	190	—	—	—	—	50	13	BPI: Silver	Young Money: Rise of an Empire
"Believe Me" (Lil Wayne featuring Drake)	2014	97	—	—	—	—	—	—	36	26	7	RIAA: 2× Platinum	Non-album singles
"Grindin'" (Lil Wayne featuring Drake)	2014	—	—	—	—	—	—	—	—	—	—		Non-album singles
"Recognize" (PartyNextDoor featuring Drake)	2014	—	—	—	—	—	—	—	96	— (Note: "Recognize" did not enter the Billboard Hot 100, but peaked at number three on the Bubbling Under Hot 100 chart.)	28	BPI: Gold; RIAA: 2× Platinum; RMNZ: Platinum	PartyNextDoor Two
"DnF" (Preme featuring Future and Drake)	2014	—	—	—	—	—	—	—	—	— (Note: "DnF" did not enter the Billboard Hot 100, but peaked at number eighteen on the Bubbling Under Hot 100 chart.)	41		Dear America
"Tuesday" (ILoveMakonnen featuring Drake)	2014	56	—	—	86	—	—	—	165	12	2	BPI: Silver; RIAA: Platinum	ILoveMakonnen
"Only" (Nicki Minaj featuring Drake, Lil Wayne, and Chris Brown)	2014	20	62	—	102	—	—	—	35	12	1	ARIA: 3× Platinum; BPI: Gold; RIAA: 3× Platinum	The Pinkprint
"Truffle Butter" (Nicki Minaj featuring Drake and Lil Wayne)	2015	43	—	—	—	—	—	—	188	14	4	ARIA: Platinum; BPI: Gold	The Pinkprint
"Blessings" (Big Sean featuring Drake and Kanye West)	2015	59	—	—	184	—	—	—	164	28	9	MC: Platinum; BPI: Silver; RIAA: 4× Platinum	Dark Sky Paradise
"100" (the Game featuring Drake)	2015	63	—	—	—	—	—	—	65	82	25	RIAA: Platinum	The Documentary 2
"R.I.C.O." (Meek Mill featuring Drake)	2015	48	—	—	—	—	—	—	—	40	14	BPI: Silver; RIAA: 2× Platinum	Dreams Worth More Than Money
"My Love" (Majid Jordan featuring Drake)	2015	—	—	—	—	—	—	—	—	—	—	MC: Gold	Majid Jordan
"Where Ya At" (Future featuring Drake)	2015	62	—	—	188	—	—	—	—	28	11	RIAA: 4× Platinum; ARIA: Gold	DS2
"Work" (Rihanna featuring Drake)	2016	1	5	1	1	5	2	2	2	1	1	MC: Gold; ARIA: 7× Platinum; GLF: 4× Platinum; BPI: 4× Platinum; RIAA: Diamond; RMNZ: Platinum; SNEP: Diamond	Anti
"Come and See Me" (PartyNextDoor featuring Drake)	2016	73	—	—	128	—	—	—	199	55	20	BPI: Platinum; RIAA: 3× Platinum	PartyNextDoor 3
"Why You Always Hatin?" (YG featuring Drake and Kamaiyah)	2016	72	—	—	—	—	—	—	—	62	18	RIAA: 2× Platinum	Still Brazy
"For Free" (DJ Khaled featuring Drake)	2016	47	70	—	79	—	—	—	25	13	4	MC: Gold; BPI: Gold; RIAA: 4× Platinum	Major Key
"Back on Road" (Gucci Mane featuring Drake)	2016	—	—	—	—	—	—	—	—	81	28	RIAA: Gold	Everybody Looking
"No Shopping" (French Montana featuring Drake)	2016	25	—	—	129	—	—	—	129	36	12	RIAA: Platinum	MC4
"Big Amount" (2 Chainz featuring Drake)	2016	—	—	—	—	—	—	—	—	— (Note: "Big Amount" did not enter the Billboard Hot 100, but peaked at number nine on the Bubbling Under Hot 100 chart.)	44	RIAA: Platinum	Pretty Girls Like Trap Music
"Wanna Know (Remix)" (Dave featuring Drake)	2016	93	—	—	—	—	—	—	51	—	—	BPI: Platinum	Non-album single
"Used to This" (Future featuring Drake)	2016	17	—	—	139	—	— (Note: "Used to This" did not enter the NZ Top 40 Singles Chart, but peaked at number six on the NZ Heatseeker Singles Chart.)	—	67	14	5	MC: Gold; BPI: Silver; RIAA: 2× Platinum	Future
"Both" (Gucci Mane featuring Drake)	2017	43	—	—	162	—	—	—	—	41	16	BPI: Silver; RIAA: 4× Platinum	The Return of East Atlanta Santa
"Come Closer" (Wizkid featuring Drake)	2017	54	—	—	—	—	—	—	58	—	—	MC: Platinum; BPI: Platinum; RIAA: Platinum	Sounds from the Other Side
"No Complaints" (Metro Boomin featuring Offset and Drake)	2017	51	—	—	—	—	— (Note: "No Complaints" did not enter the NZ Top 40 Singles Chart, but peaked at number six on the NZ Heatseeker Singles Chart.)	—	—	71	31	MC: 2× Platinum; ARIA: Gold; RIAA: Platinum	Not All Heroes Wear Capes
"Bring It Back" (Trouble and Mike Will Made It featuring Drake)	2017	—	—	—	—	—	—	—	—	—	—		Edgewood
"Look Alive" (BlocBoy JB featuring Drake)	2018	4	24	36	125	16	15	30	17	5	3	ARIA: Platinum; BPI: Platinum; IFPI SWI: Gold; RIAA: 5× Platinum; RMNZ: Gold; SNEP: Gold	Simi
"Lemon (Drake Remix)" (N.E.R.D and Rihanna featuring Drake)	2018	—	—	—	—	—	37	—	—	—	—	RMNZ: Gold	Non-album single
"Walk It Talk It" (Migos featuring Drake)	2018	14	55	—	81	52	36	66	31	10	7	MC: 2× Platinum; BPI: Platinum; RIAA: 6× Platinum; SNEP: Gold	Culture II
"Bigger Than You" (2 Chainz featuring Drake and Quavo)	2018	43	—	—	—	—	— (Note: "Bigger Than You" did not enter the NZ Top 40 Singles Chart, but peaked at number eight on the NZ Heatseeker Singles Chart.)	—	—	53	28	RIAA: Platinum; ARIA: Gold	Non-album single
"Sicko Mode" (Travis Scott featuring Drake)	2018	3	7	19	80	11	7	29	9	1	1	MC: Diamond; ARIA: 9× Platinum; RMNZ: Platinum; GLF: Gold; BPI: 2× Platinum; RIAA: 15× Platinum	Astroworld
"No Stylist" (French Montana featuring Drake)	2018	16	69	—	—	33	— (Note: "No Stylist" did not enter the NZ Top 40 Singles Chart, but peaked at number eight on the NZ Hot Singles Chart.)	54	19	47	22	MC: 2× Platinum; BPI: Platinum; RIAA: 2× Platinum; ARIA: Platinum	Montana
"Mia" (Bad Bunny featuring Drake)	2018	3	40	34	14	28	— (Note: "Mia" did not enter the NZ Top 40 Singles Chart, but peaked at number four on the NZ Hot Singles Chart.)	16	13	5	—	ARIA: Platinum; MC: 3× Platinum; BPI: Gold; IFPI SWI: Gold; RIAA: 96× Platinum (Latin)	X 100pre
"Going Bad" (Meek Mill featuring Drake)	2019	3	32	—	169	19	36	60	13	6	2	MC: 5× Platinum; ARIA: 2× Platinum; BPI: 2× Platinum; RIAA: 5× Platinum; RMNZ: Gold	Championships
"No Guidance" (Chris Brown featuring Drake)	2019	7	7	35	118	19	17	73	6	5	2	MC: 2× Platinum; ARIA: 4× Platinum; BPI: 2× Platinum; RIAA: 11× Platinum; RMNZ: Platinum	Indigo
"Gold Roses" (Rick Ross featuring Drake)	2019	33	91	—	—	—	— (Note: "Gold Roses" did not enter the NZ Top 40 Singles Chart, but peaked at number six on the NZ Hot Singles Chart.)	—	42	39	16	RIAA: Platinum	Port of Miami 2
"Won't Be Late" (Swae Lee featuring Drake)	2019	34	—	—	—	—	— (Note: "Won't Be Late" did not enter the NZ Top 40 Singles Chart, but peaked at number 10 on the NZ Hot Singles Chart.)	— (Note: "Won't Be Late" did not enter the Swedish Singellista Chart, but peaked at number one on the Swedish Heatseeker Chart.)	50	75	30		Non-album singles
"Ela É do Tipo" (Kevin O Chris featuring Drake)	2019	—	—	—	—	—	—	—	—	—	—		Non-album singles
"Loyal" (PartyNextDoor featuring Drake)	2019	19	82	—	—	60	— (Note: "Loyal" did not enter the NZ Top 40 Singles Chart, but peaked at number 11 on the NZ Hot Singles Chart.)	— (Note: "Loyal" did not enter the Swedish Singellista Chart, but peaked at number 12 on the Swedish Heatseeker Chart.)	31	63	29	BPI: Silver; RIAA: Platinum	Partymobile
"—" denotes a recording that did not chart or was not released in that territory.

=== 2020s ===
List of singles released in the 2020s decade as featured artist, with selected chart positions, certifications, and associated albums
Title	Year	Peak chart positions										Certifications	Album
Title	Year	CAN	AUS	DEN	FRA	IRE	NZ	SWE	UK	US	US R&B /HH	Certifications	Album
"Life Is Good" (Future featuring Drake)	2020	3	11	10	33	5	13	23	3	2	2	ARIA: 2× Platinum; BPI: Platinum; GLF: Platinum; RIAA: 15x Platinum; RMNZ: Gold; SNEP: Gold	High Off Life
"Oprah's Bank Account" (Lil Yachty and DaBaby featuring Drake)	2020	38	93	—	—	—	— (Note: "Oprah's Bank Account" did not enter the NZ Top 40 Singles Chart, but peaked at number 16 on the NZ Hot Singles Chart.)	—	54	55	32	RIAA: Platinum; ARIA: Gold	Lil Boat 3
"Popstar" (DJ Khaled featuring Drake)	2020	1	10	26	101	15	17	33	11	3	3	ARIA: 2× Platinum; BPI: Gold; RIAA: 4× Platinum; SNEP: Gold	Khaled Khaled
"Greece" (DJ Khaled featuring Drake)	2020	3	35	—	129	14	— (Note: "Greece" did not enter the NZ Top 40 Singles Chart, but peaked at number two on the NZ Hot Singles Chart.)	73	8	8	6	ARIA: Platinum; RIAA: 2× Platinum; BPI: Platinum	Khaled Khaled
"Twist & Turn" (Popcaan featuring Drake and PartyNextDoor)	2020	47	—	—	—	—	—	—	69	— (Note: "Twist & Turn" did not enter the Billboard Hot 100, but peaked at number 19 on the Bubbling Under Hot 100 chart.)	—	BPI: Silver	Fixtape
"Mr. Right Now" (21 Savage and Metro Boomin featuring Drake)	2020	9	39	—	125	23	— (Note: "Mr. Right Now" did not enter the NZ Top 40 Singles Chart, but peaked at number three on the NZ Hot Singles Chart.)	— (Note: "Mr. Right Now" did not enter the Swedish Singellista Chart, but peaked at number six on the Swedish Heatseeker Chart.)	28	10	6	RIAA: 3× Platinum; MC: Gold	Savage Mode II
"Outta Time" (Bryson Tiller featuring Drake)	2020	31	60	—	—	68	— (Note: "Outta Time" did not enter the NZ Top 40 Singles Chart, but peaked at number six on the NZ Hot Singles Chart.)	—	24	48	22		Anniversary
"You're Mines Still (Remix)" (Yung Bleu featuring Drake)	2020	18	—	—	—	—	—	—	45	18	10	BPI: Gold; RIAA: 2× Platinum	Love Scars: The 5 Stages of Emotions (Deluxe) and Moon Boy
"B.B. King Freestyle" (Lil Wayne featuring Drake)	2020	100	—	—	—	—	—	—	—	—	—		No Ceilings 3
"Talk to Me" (Drakeo the Ruler featuring Drake)	2021	85	—	—	—	—	—	—	—	— (Note: "Talk to Me" did not enter the Billboard Hot 100, but peaked at number eight on the Bubbling Under Hot 100 chart.)	43		The Truth Hurts
"Wasting Time" (Brent Faiyaz featuring Drake)	2021	44	—	—	—	82	— (Note: "Wasting Time" did not enter the NZ Top 40 Singles Chart, but peaked at number five on the NZ Hot Singles Chart.)	—	34	49	18	RIAA: Platinum	Wasteland
"Over the Top" (Smiley featuring Drake)	2021	13	—	—	—	73	— (Note: "Over the Top" did not enter the NZ Top 40 Singles Chart, but peaked at number 11 on the NZ Hot Singles Chart.)	—	97	57	19	RIAA: Gold	Buy or Bye 2
"Wait for U" (Future featuring Drake and Tems)	2022	3	12	—	135	21	7	— (Note: "Wait for U" did not enter the Swedish Singellista Chart, but peaked at number one on the Swedish Heatseeker Chart.)	8	1	1	MC: Platinum; ARIA: 2× Platinum; RMNZ: Gold; BPI: Platinum; RIAA: 11x Platinum	I Never Liked You
"Staying Alive" (DJ Khaled featuring Drake and Lil Baby)	2022	3	16	31	—	26	19	36	21	5	3	RIAA: Platinum; RMNZ: Gold	God Did
"We Caa Done" (Popcaan featuring Drake)	2023	36	—	—	—	60	— (Note: "We Caa Done" did not enter the NZ Top 40 Singles Chart, but peaked at number five on the NZ Hot Singles Chart.)	—	37	— (Note: "We Caa Done" did not enter the Billboard Hot 100, but peaked at number 16 on the Bubbling Under Hot 100 chart.)	—		Great Is He
"Who Told You" (J Hus featuring Drake)	2023	27	67	28	—	4	— (Note: "Who Told You" did not enter the NZ Top 40 Singles Chart, but peaked at number three on the NZ Hot Singles Chart.)	32	2	— (Note: "Who Told You" did not enter the Billboard Hot 100, but peaked at number one on the Bubbling Under Hot 100 chart.)	35	BPI: Platinum	Beautiful and Brutal Yard
"Oh U Went" (Young Thug featuring Drake)	2023	20	—	—	—	—	— (Note: "Oh U Went" did not enter the NZ Top 40 Singles Chart, but peaked at number five on the NZ Hot Singles Chart.)	—	65	19	9		Business Is Business
"Meltdown" (Travis Scott featuring Drake)	2023	1	8	17	21	10	4	45	10	3	1	MC: 2× Platinum; RIAA: 2× Platinum	Utopia
"Act II: Date @ 8 (Remix)" (4Batz featuring Drake)	2024	14	—	37	—	28	—	73	18	7	3		Non-album single
"Wah Gwan Delilah" (Snowd4y featuring Drake)	2024	—	—	—	—	—	—	—	—	—	—		Non-album single
"Hot Uptown" (Camila Cabello featuring Drake)	2024	42	—	—	—	—	— (Note: "Hot Uptown" did not enter the NZ Top 40 Singles Chart, but peaked at number nine on the NZ Hot Singles Chart.)	—	—	62	—		C,XOXO
"Sideways" (Gordo featuring Drake)	2024	44	—	—	—	100	— (Note: "Sideways" did not enter the NZ Top 40 Singles Chart, but peaked at number seven on the NZ Hot Singles Chart.)	—	—	— (Note: "Sideways" did not enter the Billboard Hot 100, but peaked at number nine on the Bubbling Under Hot 100 chart.)	—		Diamante
"Modo Capone" (Chino Pacas featuring Fuerza Regida and Drake)	—	—	—	—	—	—	—	—	— (Note: "Modo Capone" did not enter the Billboard Hot 100, but peaked at number eight on the Bubbling Under Hot 100 chart.)	—	—		Que Sigan Llegando las Pacas
"2 Mazza" (Smiley featuring Drake)	2025	55	—	—	—	—	—	—	—	—	—		Don't Box Me In
"No Brakes" (The Game featuring Drake)	2026	—	—	—	—	—	— (Note: "No Brakes" did not enter the NZ Top 40 Singles Chart, but peaked at number 15 on the NZ Hot Singles Chart.)	—	—	—	38		The Documentary III
"Ya Hit" (Future featuring Drake, Travis Scott, and Loe Shimmy)	2026	23	—	—	—	—	—	—	—	38	5		Infinity
"—" denotes a recording that did not chart or was not released in that territory.

== Promotional singles ==
List of promotional singles, with selected chart positions, showing year released and album name
Title	Year	Peak chart positions								Certifications	Album
Title	Year	CAN	AUS	FRA	IRE	NZ	SWE	UK	US	Certifications	Album
"9AM in Dallas"	2010	55	—	—	—	—	—	—	57		Thank Me Later
"We in This Bitch 1.5" (DJ Drama featuring Drake and Future)	2012	—	—	—	—	—	—	—	—		Quality Street Music
"Wu-Tang Forever"	2013	44	—	—	—	—	—	—	52		Nothing Was the Same
"To the Max" (DJ Khaled featuring Drake)	2017	32	70	— (Note: "Diplomatic Immunity" did not enter the French Singles Chart, but peaked at number 200 on the French Downloads Chart.)	83	— (Note: "To the Max" did not enter the NZ Top 40 Singles Chart, but peaked at number two on the NZ Heatseeker Singles Chart.)	—	49	53	RIAA: Gold	Grateful
"Diplomatic Immunity"	2018	6	54	169	38	— (Note: "Diplomatic Immunity" did not enter the NZ Top 40 Singles Chart, but peaked at number three on the NZ Heatseeker Singles Chart.)	84	21	7		Scary Hours
"Behind Barz" (Bonus)	2019	28	—	—	47	—	—	49	75	BPI: Silver; RIAA: Platinum	Top Boy (A Selection of Music Inspired by the Series)
"—" denotes a recording that did not chart or was not released in that territory.

== Other charted and certified songs ==
List of songs, with selected chart positions and certifications, showing year released and album name
Title	Year	Peak chart positions										Certifications	Album
Title	Year	CAN	AUS	DEN	FRA	IRE	NZ	SWE	UK	US	WW	Certifications	Album
"I Get Paper" (Kevin Cossom featuring Drake)	2009	59	—	—	—	—	—	—	—	—	—		Hook vs. Bridge
"Fireworks" (featuring Alicia Keys)	2010	—	—	—	—	—	—	—	—	71	—		Thank Me Later
"Up All Night" (featuring Nicki Minaj)	2010	80	—	—	—	—	—	—	—	49	—	ARIA: Gold; RIAA: Platinum	Thank Me Later
"Shut It Down" (featuring The-Dream)	2010	—	—	—	—	—	—	—	—	— (Note: "Shut It Down" did not enter the Billboard Hot 100, but peaked at number 25 on the Bubbling Under Hot 100 chart.)	—		Thank Me Later
"Unforgettable" (featuring Young Jeezy)	2010	—	—	—	—	—	—	—	—	— (Note: "Unforgettable" did not enter the Billboard Hot 100, but peaked at number 24 on the Bubbling Under Hot 100 chart.)	—		Thank Me Later
"Light Up" (featuring Jay-Z)	2010	—	—	—	—	—	—	—	—	— (Note: "Light Up" did not enter the Billboard Hot 100, but peaked at number 16 on the Bubbling Under Hot 100 chart.)	—		Thank Me Later
"Gonorrhea" (Lil Wayne featuring Drake)	2010	86	—	—	—	—	—	—	—	17	—	RIAA: Gold	I Am Not a Human Being
"In the Morning" (J. Cole featuring Drake)	2011	—	—	—	—	—	—	—	—	— (Note: "In the Morning" did not enter the Billboard Hot 100, but peaked at number 17 on the Bubbling Under Hot 100 chart.)	—	RIAA: Platinum	Friday Night Lights and Cole World: The Sideline Story
"Tony Montana" (Remix) (Future featuring Drake)	2011	—	—	—	—	—	—	—	—	—	—	RIAA: Gold	Pluto
"Over My Dead Body"	2011	—	—	—	—	—	—	—	—	— (Note: "Over My Dead Body" did not enter the Billboard Hot 100, but peaked at number two on the Bubbling Under Hot 100 chart.)	—		Take Care
"Shot for Me"	2011	—	—	—	—	—	—	—	—	100	—	ARIA: Gold; BPI: Silver; RIAA: Platinum	Take Care
"Under Ground Kings"	2011	—	—	—	—	—	—	—	—	— (Note: "Under Ground Kings" did not enter the Billboard Hot 100, but peaked at number eight on the Bubbling Under Hot 100 chart.)	—		Take Care
"We'll Be Fine" (featuring Birdman)	2011	—	—	—	—	—	—	—	—	89	—		Take Care
"Lord Knows" (featuring Rick Ross)	2011	—	—	—	—	—	—	—	—	— (Note: "Lord Knows" did not enter the Billboard Hot 100, but peaked at number 17 on the Bubbling Under Hot 100 chart.)	—		Take Care
"Doing It Wrong"	2011	—	—	—	—	—	—	—	—	— (Note: "Doing It Wrong" did not enter the Billboard Hot 100, but peaked at number 19 on the Bubbling Under Hot 100 chart.)	—	ARIA: Gold; BPI: Silver; RIAA: Platinum	Take Care
"The Real Her" (featuring Lil Wayne and André 3000)	2011	—	—	—	—	—	—	—	—	— (Note: "The Real Her" did not enter the Billboard Hot 100, but peaked at number four on the Bubbling Under Hot 100 chart.)	—		Take Care
"Practice"	2011	56	—	—	—	—	—	— (Note: "Practice" did not enter the Swedish Singellista Chart, but peaked at number 16 on the Swedish Heatseeker Chart.)	27	— (Note: "Practice" did not enter the Billboard Hot 100, but peaked at number seven on the Bubbling Under Hot 100 chart.)	—	ARIA: Gold; RIAA: Platinum	Take Care
"Hate Sleeping Alone"	2011	—	—	—	—	—	—	—	—	67	—		Take Care
"Cameras / Good Ones Go Interlude"	2011	—	—	—	—	—	—	—	—	—	—	ARIA: Gold	Take Care
"I Do It" (2 Chainz featuring Drake and Lil Wayne)	2013	—	—	—	—	—	—	—	—	94	—		B.O.A.T.S. II: Me Time
"Tuscan Leather"	2013	—	—	—	—	—	—	—	183	81	—		Nothing Was the Same
"Furthest Thing"	2013	—	—	—	191	—	—	—	95	56	—	ARIA: Gold; BPI: Silver; RIAA: Platinum	Nothing Was the Same
"Own It"	2013	—	—	—	—	—	—	—	163	78	—		Nothing Was the Same
"From Time" (featuring Jhené Aiko)	2013	—	—	—	126	—	—	—	56	67	—	BPI: Platinum; RIAA: Platinum	Nothing Was the Same
"Connect"	2013	—	—	—	—	—	—	—	—	— (Note: "Connect" did not enter the Billboard Hot 100, but peaked at number two on the Bubbling Under Hot 100 chart.)	—		Nothing Was the Same
"305 to My City" (featuring Detail)	2013	—	—	—	—	—	—	—	—	— (Note: "305 to My City" did not enter the Billboard Hot 100, but peaked at number eleven on the Bubbling Under Hot 100 chart.)	—		Nothing Was the Same
"Paris Morton Music 2"	2013	88	—	—	—	—	—	—	111	65	—	RIAA: Platinum	Nothing Was the Same
"Come Thru"	2013	—	—	—	—	—	—	—	149	87	—	ARIA: Gold; BPI: Silver	Nothing Was the Same
"Cabaret" (Justin Timberlake featuring Drake)	2013	—	—	—	—	—	—	—	—	—	—		The 20/20 Experience – 2 of 2
"Mine" (Beyoncé featuring Drake)	2013	82	—	—	149	—	—	—	65	82	—	RIAA: Platinum	Beyoncé
"Legend"	2015	—	—	—	—	—	—	—	70	52	—	ARIA: Platinum; BPI: Silver; RIAA: 2× Platinum	If You're Reading This It's Too Late
"10 Bands"	2015	—	—	—	—	—	—	—	92	58	—	ARIA: Gold; BPI: Silver; RIAA: Platinum	If You're Reading This It's Too Late
"Know Yourself"	2015	99	—	—	—	—	—	—	95	53	—	ARIA: Platinum; BPI: Silver; RIAA: 2× Platinum	If You're Reading This It's Too Late
"No Tellin'"	2015	—	—	—	—	—	—	—	119	81	—	ARIA: Gold	If You're Reading This It's Too Late
"Madonna"	2015	—	—	—	—	—	—	—	158	— (Note: "Madonna" did not enter the Billboard Hot 100, but peaked at number four on the Bubbling Under Hot 100 chart.)	—		If You're Reading This It's Too Late
"6 God"	2015	—	—	—	—	—	—	—	129	83	—	ARIA: Gold; RIAA: Platinum	If You're Reading This It's Too Late
"Star67"	2015	—	—	—	—	—	—	—	155	— (Note: "Star67" did not enter the Billboard Hot 100, but peaked at number three on the Bubbling Under Hot 100 chart.)	—		If You're Reading This It's Too Late
"Wednesday Night Interlude" (featuring PartyNextDoor)	2015	—	—	—	—	—	—	—	149	— (Note: "Wednesday Night Interlude" did not enter the Billboard Hot 100, but peaked at number nine on the Bubbling Under Hot 100 chart.)	—		If You're Reading This It's Too Late
"Used To" (featuring Lil Wayne)	2015	—	—	—	—	—	—	—	150	84	—		If You're Reading This It's Too Late
"6 Man"	2015	—	—	—	—	—	—	—	175	97	—		If You're Reading This It's Too Late
"Now & Forever"	2015	—	—	—	—	—	—	—	103	95	—		If You're Reading This It's Too Late
"Company" (featuring Travis Scott)	2015	—	—	—	—	—	—	—	182	— (Note: "Company" did not enter the Billboard Hot 100, but peaked at number six on the Bubbling Under Hot 100 chart.)	—		If You're Reading This It's Too Late
"You & the 6"	2015	—	—	—	—	—	—	—	—	— (Note: "You & the 6" did not enter the Billboard Hot 100, but peaked at number sixteen on the Bubbling Under Hot 100 chart.)	—		If You're Reading This It's Too Late
"Jungle"	2015	—	—	—	—	—	—	—	135	— (Note: "Jungle" did not enter the Billboard Hot 100, but peaked at number two on the Bubbling Under Hot 100 chart.)	—	ARIA: Platinum; BPI: Silver; RIAA: 3× Platinum	If You're Reading This It's Too Late
"6PM in New York"	2015	—	—	—	—	—	—	—	192	— (Note: "6PM in New York" did not enter the Billboard Hot 100, but peaked at number twelve on the Bubbling Under Hot 100 chart.)	—		If You're Reading This It's Too Late
"Digital Dash" (with Future)	2015	—	—	—	—	—	—	—	132	62	—	RIAA: Platinum	What a Time to Be Alive
"Big Rings" (with Future)	2015	91	—	—	—	—	—	—	141	52	—	ARIA: Gold; RIAA: 2× Platinum	What a Time to Be Alive
"Live from the Gutter" (with Future)	2015	—	—	—	—	—	—	—	171	74	—		What a Time to Be Alive
"Diamonds Dancing" (with Future)	2015	79	—	—	—	—	—	—	194	53	—	RIAA: Platinum	What a Time to Be Alive
"Scholarships" (with Future)	2015	—	—	—	—	—	—	—	164	69	—	RIAA: Platinum	What a Time to Be Alive
"Plastic Bag" (with Future)	2015	—	—	—	—	—	—	—	178	78	—		What a Time to Be Alive
"I'm the Plug" (with Future)	2015	—	—	—	—	—	—	—	—	76	—		What a Time to Be Alive
"Change Locations" (with Future)	2015	—	—	—	—	—	—	—	182	82	—		What a Time to Be Alive
"30 for 30 Freestyle"	2015	—	—	—	—	—	—	—	—	88	—		What a Time to Be Alive
"Keep the Family Close"	2016	57	—	—	—	—	—	—	90	68	—		Views
"9"	2016	39	—	—	—	—	—	—	84	45	—	RIAA: Platinum; BPI: Gold	Views
"U with Me?"	2016	47	—	—	—	—	—	—	72	44	—	ARIA: Gold; BPI: Silver; RIAA: Platinum	Views
"Feel No Ways"	2016	44	—	—	—	—	—	—	62	53	—	ARIA: Platinum; BPI: Gold; RIAA: Platinum	Views
"Hype"	2016	31	—	—	176	88	—	—	70	33	—	ARIA: Gold; BPI: Silver; RIAA: Platinum	Views
"Weston Road Flows"	2016	51	—	—	—	—	—	—	93	54	—	BPI: Silver	Views
"Redemption"	2016	59	—	—	—	—	—	—	99	61	—	ARIA: Gold; BPI: Silver; RIAA: Platinum	Views
"With You" (featuring PartyNextDoor)	2016	32	—	—	182	96	—	—	55	47	—	ARIA: Gold; BPI: Silver; RIAA: Platinum	Views
"Faithful" (featuring Pimp C and Dvsn)	2016	61	—	—	—	—	—	—	108	72	—		Views
"Still Here"	2016	37	—	—	—	—	—	—	78	40	—	ARIA: Gold; BPI: Silver; RIAA: Platinum	Views
"Grammys" (featuring Future)	2016	34	—	—	—	87	—	—	68	38	—	ARIA: Gold; BPI: Silver; RIAA: Platinum	Views
"Childs Play"	2016	49	—	—	—	—	—	—	77	49	—	ARIA: Platinum; BPI: Gold; RIAA: Platinum	Views
"Summers Over Interlude"	2016	88	—	—	—	—	—	—	142	— (Note: "Summers Over Interlude" did not enter the Billboard Hot 100, but peaked at number two on the Bubbling Under Hot 100 chart.)	—		Views
"Fire & Desire"	2016	64	—	—	—	—	—	—	88	75	—	ARIA: Platinum; BPI: Gold; RIAA: Platinum	Views
"Views"	2016	72	—	—	—	—	—	—	117	86	—		Views
"No Long Talk" (featuring Giggs)	2017	14	—	—	124	40	—	92	17	40	—	ARIA: Gold; BPI: Silver	More Life
"Jorja Interlude"	2017	28	—	—	151	51	—	— (Note: "Jorja Interlude" did not enter the Swedish Singellista chart, but peaked at number four on the Sweden Heatseeker chart.)	42	49	—	ARIA: Gold; BPI: Silver	More Life
"Get It Together" (featuring Black Coffee and Jorja Smith)	2017	20	—	—	116	30	—	88	24	45	—	ARIA: Platinum; BPI: Platinum; RMNZ: Platinum	More Life
"Madiba Riddim"	2017	23	—	—	110	42	—	90	31	51	—	ARIA: Gold; BPI: Silver	More Life
"Blem"	2017	8	—	36	107	26	—	34	10	38	—	ARIA: Platinum; BPI: Platinum; RIAA: Platinum	More Life
"4422" (featuring Sampha)	2017	27	—	—	135	54	—	— (Note: "4422" did not enter the Swedish Singellista chart, but peaked at number five on the Sweden Heatseeker chart.)	39	50	—	ARIA: Gold; BPI: Silver	More Life
"Gyalchester"	2017	13	—	—	143	44	—	— (Note: "Gyalchester" did not enter the Swedish Singellista chart, but peaked at number one on the Sweden Heatseeker chart.)	32	29	—	ARIA: Platinum; BPI: Gold; RIAA: Platinum	More Life
"Skepta Interlude"	2017	36	—	—	—	55	—	— (Note: "Skepta Interlude" did not enter the Swedish Singellista chart, but peaked at number 11 on the Sweden Heatseeker chart.)	35	76	—	ARIA: Gold; BPI: Silver	More Life
"Sacrifices" (featuring 2 Chainz and Young Thug)	2017	26	—	—	173	62	—	— (Note: "Sacrifices" did not enter the Swedish Singellista chart, but peaked at number 10 on the Sweden Heatseeker chart.)	51	36	—	ARIA: Gold; BPI: Silver	More Life
"Nothings Into Somethings"	2017	40	—	—	—	73	—	—	62	61	—		More Life
"Teenage Fever"	2017	22	—	—	172	49	—	— (Note: "Teenage Fever" did not enter the Swedish Singellista chart, but peaked at number eight on the Sweden Heatseeker chart.)	37	35	—	ARIA: 3× Platinum; BPI: Platinum; RIAA: Platinum	More Life
"KMT" (featuring Giggs)	2017	25	—	—	183	44	—	— (Note: "KMT" did not enter the Swedish Singellista chart, but peaked at number seven on the Sweden Heatseeker chart.)	9	48	—	ARIA: Gold; BPI: Platinum	More Life
"Lose You"	2017	41	—	—	—	66	—	— (Note: "Lose You" did not enter the Swedish Singellista chart, but peaked at number 20 on the Sweden Heatseeker chart.)	54	64	—		More Life
"Can't Have Everything"	2017	53	—	—	—	70	—	—	58	82	—	BPI: Silver	More Life
"Since Way Back" (featuring PartyNextDoor)	2017	49	—	—	—	81	—	—	63	70	—		More Life
"Ice Melts" (featuring Young Thug)	2017	48	—	—	—	84	—	—	65	62	—	BPI: Silver	More Life
"Do Not Disturb"	2017	44	—	—	—	69	—	— (Note: "Do Not Disturb" did not enter the Swedish Singellista chart, but peaked at number 14 on the Sweden Heatseeker chart.)	61	60	—	ARIA: 2× Platinum; BPI: Platinum; RIAA: Platinum	More Life
"Survival"	2018	18	—	—	68	—	—	45	— (Note: "Survival" did not enter the UK Singles Chart, as chart rules only allow three songs per artist to chart within the top 100 at a time, but peaked at number 10 on the UK Streaming Chart.)	17	—		Scorpion
"Elevate"	2018	15	—	—	71	—	—	53	— (Note: "Elevate" did not enter the UK Singles Chart, as chart rules only allow three songs per artist to chart within the top 100 at a time, but peaked at number 11 on the UK Streaming Chart.)	14	—	MC: Gold; ARIA: Gold; BPI: Silver	Scorpion
"Emotionless"	2018	13	12	—	78	13	27	38	5	8	—	MC: Gold; ARIA: Gold; BPI: Silver	Scorpion
"8 Out of 10"	2018	19	27	—	102	—	—	33	— (Note: "8 Out of 10" did not enter the UK Singles Chart, as chart rules only allow three songs per artist to chart within the top 100 at a time, but peaked at number 14 on the UK Streaming Chart.)	21	—	ARIA: Gold; BPI: Silver	Scorpion
"Can't Take a Joke"	2018	16	36	—	132	—	—	75	— (Note: "Can't Take a Joke" did not enter the UK Singles Chart, as chart rules only allow three songs per artist to chart within the top 100 at a time, but peaked at number 16 on the UK Streaming Chart.)	18	—	MC: Gold; ARIA: Gold; BPI: Silver	Scorpion
"Sandra's Rose"	2018	28	—	—	153	—	—	79	— (Note: "Sandra's Rose" did not enter the UK Singles Chart, as chart rules only allow three songs per artist to chart within the top 100 at a time, but peaked at number 24 on the UK Streaming Chart.)	27	—	ARIA: Gold	Scorpion
"Talk Up" (featuring Jay-Z)	2018	17	33	—	123	—	—	55	— (Note: "Talk Up" did not enter the UK Singles Chart, as chart rules only allow three songs per artist to chart within the top 100 at a time, but peaked at number 22 on the UK Streaming Chart.)	20	—		Scorpion
"Is There More"	2018	38	67	—	198	—	—	— (Note: "Is There More" did not enter the Swedish Singellista Chart, but peaked at number 13 on the Sweden Heatseeker Chart.)	— (Note: "Is There More" did not enter the UK Singles Chart, as chart rules only allow three songs per artist to chart within the top 100 at a time, but peaked at number 42 on the UK Streaming Chart.)	36	—		Scorpion
"Peak"	2018	37	58	—	151	—	—	— (Note: "Peak" did not enter the Swedish Singellista Chart, but peaked at number three on the Sweden Heatseeker Chart.)	— (Note: "Peak" did not enter the UK Singles Chart, as chart rules only allow three songs per artist to chart within the top 100 at a time, but peaked at number 35 on the UK Streaming Chart.)	38	—		Scorpion
"Summer Games"	2018	27	52	—	163	—	—	94	— (Note: "Summer Games" did not enter the UK Singles Chart, as chart rules only allow three songs per artist to chart within the top 100 at a time, but peaked at number 28 on the UK Streaming Chart.)	28	—		Scorpion
"Jaded"	2018	36	64	—	196	—	—	— (Note: "Jaded" did not enter the Swedish Singellista Chart, but peaked at number five on the Sweden Heatseeker Chart.)	— (Note: "Jaded" did not enter the UK Singles Chart, as chart rules only allow three songs per artist to chart within the top 100 at a time, but peaked at number 39 on the UK Streaming Chart.)	32	—	ARIA: Gold; BPI: Silver	Scorpion
"Finesse"	2018	39	57	—	191	—	—	— (Note: "Finesse" did not enter the Swedish Singellista Chart, but peaked at number eight on the Sweden Heatseeker Chart.)	— (Note: "Finesse" did not enter the UK Singles Chart, as chart rules only allow three songs per artist to chart within the top 100 at a time, but peaked at number 41 on the UK Streaming Chart.)	42	—	ARIA: Platinum; BPI: Silver	Scorpion
"Ratchet Happy Birthday"	2018	43	73	—	—	—	—	— (Note: "Ratchet Happy Birthday" did not enter the Swedish Singellista Chart, but peaked at number 17 on the Sweden Heatseeker Chart.)	— (Note: "Ratchet Happy Birthday" did not enter the UK Singles Chart, as chart rules only allow three songs per artist to chart within the top 100 at a time, but peaked at number 51 on the UK Streaming Chart.)	51	—		Scorpion
"That's How You Feel"	2018	34	62	—	—	—	—	— (Note: "That's How You Feel" did not enter the Swedish Singellista Chart, but peaked at number nine on the Sweden Heatseeker Chart.)	— (Note: "That's How You Feel" did not enter the UK Singles Chart, as chart rules only allow three songs per artist to chart within the top 100 at a time, but peaked at number 38 on the UK Streaming Chart.)	37	—	ARIA: Gold	Scorpion
"Blue Tint"	2018	30	66	—	179	—	—	— (Note: "Blue Tint" did not enter the Swedish Singellista Chart, but peaked at number four on the Sweden Heatseeker Chart.)	— (Note: "Blue Tint" did not enter the UK Singles Chart, as chart rules only allow three songs per artist to chart within the top 100 at a time, but peaked at number 33 on the UK Streaming Chart.)	30	—	ARIA: Gold	Scorpion
"After Dark" (featuring Static Major and Ty Dolla Sign)	2018	40	63	—	193	—	—	— (Note: "After Dark" did not enter the Swedish Singellista Chart, but peaked at number two on the Sweden Heatseeker Chart.)	— (Note: "After Dark" did not enter the UK Singles Chart, as chart rules only allow three songs per artist to chart within the top 100 at a time, but peaked at number 37 on the UK Streaming Chart.)	41	—	ARIA: Gold	Scorpion
"Final Fantasy"	2018	52	84	—	—	—	—	—	— (Note: "Final Fantasy" did not enter the UK Singles Chart, as chart rules only allow three songs per artist to chart within the top 100 at a time, but peaked at number 60 on the UK Streaming Chart.)	56	—		Scorpion
"March 14"	2018	54	87	—	—	—	—	—	— (Note: "March 14" did not enter the UK Singles Chart, as chart rules only allow three songs per artist to chart within the top 100 at a time, but peaked at number 62 on the UK Streaming Chart.)	57	—		Scorpion
"Never Recover" (with Lil Baby and Gunna)	2018	16	—	—	—	89	— (Note: "Never Recover" did not enter the NZ Top 40 Singles Chart, but peaked at number seven on the NZ Hot Singles Chart.)	— (Note: "Never Recover" did not enter the Swedish Singellista Chart, but peaked at number two on the Sweden Heatseeker Chart.)	46	15	—	RIAA: 2× Platinum; BPI: Silver	Drip Harder
"Flip the Switch" (Quavo featuring Drake)	2018	26	—	—	—	76	— (Note: "Flip the Switch" did not enter the NZ Top 40 Singles Chart, but peaked at number seven on the NZ Hot Singles Chart.)	—	55	48	—	RIAA: Gold	Quavo Huncho
"Dreams Money Can Buy"	2019	64	—	—	—	—	—	—	— (Note: "Dreams Money Can Buy" did not enter the UK Singles Chart, as chart rules only allow three songs per artist to chart within the top 100 at a time, but peaked at number 95 on the UK Streaming Chart.)	68	—		Care Package
"The Motion (feat. Sampha)"	2019	52	—	—	107	—	—	—	93	61	—	ARIA: Gold; BPI: Silver	Care Package
"How Bout Now"	2019	57	—	—	—	—	—	—	50	60	—		Care Package
"Trust Issues"	2019	63	—	—	—	—	—	—	— (Note: "Trust Issues" did not enter the UK Singles Chart, as chart rules only allow three songs per artist to chart within the top 100 at a time, but peaked at number 90 on the UK Streaming Chart.)	58	—	ARIA: Platinum; BPI: Silver	Care Package
"Days in the East"	2019	—	—	—	—	—	—	—	—	95	—		Care Package
"Draft Day"	2019	—	—	—	—	—	—	—	—	— (Note: "Draft Day" did not enter the Billboard Hot 100, but peaked at number nine on the Bubbling Under Hot 100 chart.)	—		Care Package
"4PM in Calabasas"	2019	80	—	—	—	—	—	—	72	— (Note: "4PM in Calabasas" did not enter the Billboard Hot 100, but peaked at number two on the Bubbling Under Hot 100 chart.)	—		Care Package
"5AM in Toronto"	2019	69	—	—	—	—	—	—	—	— (Note: "5AM in Toronto" did not enter the Billboard Hot 100, but peaked at number six on the Bubbling Under Hot 100 chart.)	—		Care Package
"I Get Lonely"	2019	—	—	—	—	—	—	—	—	— (Note: "I Get Lonely" did not enter the Billboard Hot 100, but peaked at number 12 on the Bubbling Under Hot 100 chart.)	—		Care Package
"Jodeci Freestyle" (featuring J. Cole)	2019	—	—	—	—	—	—	—	—	— (Note: "Jodeci Freestyle" did not enter the Billboard Hot 100, but peaked at number 18 on the Bubbling Under Hot 100 chart.)	—		Care Package
"Club Paradise"	2019	84	—	—	—	—	—	—	—	85	—		Care Package
"Girls Love Beyoncé" (featuring James Fauntleroy)	2019	—	—	—	—	—	—	—	—	— (Note: "Girls Love Beyoncé" did not enter the Billboard Hot 100, but peaked at number five on the Bubbling Under Hot 100 chart.)	—		Care Package
"Can I"	2019	—	—	—	—	—	—	—	—	—	—	ARIA: Gold	Care Package
"Deep Pockets"	2020	33	—	—	127	—	—	—	— (Note: "Deep Pockets" did not enter the UK Singles Chart, as chart rules only allow three songs per artist to chart within the top 100 at a time, but peaked at number 49 on the UK Streaming Chart.)	32	—		Dark Lane Demo Tapes
"When to Say When"	2020	38	—	—	151	—	—	—	— (Note: "When to Say When" did not enter the UK Singles Chart, as chart rules only allow three songs per artist to chart within the top 100 at a time, but peaked at number 47 on the UK Streaming Chart.)	35	—		Dark Lane Demo Tapes
"Chicago Freestyle" (with Giveon)	2020	13	—	—	62	9	31	— (Note: "Chicago Freestyle" did not enter the Swedish Singellista chart, but peaked at number three on the Sweden Heatseeker chart.)	10	14	146	ARIA: Platinum; BPI: Platinum; RIAA: 5× Platinum	Dark Lane Demo Tapes
"Not You Too" (featuring Chris Brown)	2020	29	—	—	97	—	— (Note: "Not You Too" did not enter the NZ Top 40 Singles Chart, but peaked at number six on the NZ Hot Singles Chart.)	—	— (Note: "Not You Too" did not enter the UK Singles Chart, as chart rules only allow three songs per artist to chart within the top 100 at a time, but peaked at number 33 on the UK Streaming Chart.)	25	—	ARIA: Gold; BPI: Silver	Dark Lane Demo Tapes
"Desires" (featuring Future)	2020	28	—	—	111	—	—	—	— (Note: "Desires" did not enter the UK Singles Chart, as chart rules only allow three songs per artist to chart within the top 100 at a time, but peaked at number 39 on the UK Streaming Chart.)	27	—		Dark Lane Demo Tapes
"Time Flies"	2020	22	—	—	152	—	—	—	— (Note: "Time Flies" did not enter the UK Singles Chart, as chart rules only allow three songs per artist to chart within the top 100 at a time, but peaked at number 34 on the UK Streaming Chart.)	30	—	ARIA: Platinum; BPI: Silver	Dark Lane Demo Tapes
"Landed"	2020	35	—	—	—	—	—	—	— (Note: "Landed" did not enter the UK Singles Chart, as chart rules only allow three songs per artist to chart within the top 100 at a time, but peaked at number 59 on the UK Streaming Chart.)	39	—		Dark Lane Demo Tapes
"D4L" (with Future and Young Thug)	2020	17	—	—	123	—	— (Note: "D4L" did not enter the NZ Top 40 Singles Chart, but peaked at number seven on the NZ Hot Singles Chart.)	— (Note: "D4L" did not enter the Swedish Singellista chart, but peaked at number 16 on the Sweden Heatseeker chart.)	— (Note: "D4L" did not enter the UK Singles Chart, as chart rules only allow three songs per artist to chart within the top 100 at a time, but peaked at number 57 on the UK Streaming Chart.)	19	—		Dark Lane Demo Tapes
"Pain 1993" (featuring Playboi Carti)	2020	7	—	—	50	15	17	69	17	7	—	ARIA: Gold	Dark Lane Demo Tapes
"Losses"	2020	49	—	—	—	—	—	—	— (Note: "Losses" did not enter the UK Singles Chart, as chart rules only allow three songs per artist to chart within the top 100 at a time, but peaked at number 80 on the UK Streaming Chart.)	51	—		Dark Lane Demo Tapes
"From Florida With Love"	2020	43	—	—	—	—	—	—	— (Note: "From Florida With Love" did not enter the UK Singles Chart, as chart rules only allow three songs per artist to chart within the top 100 at a time, but peaked at number 84 on the UK Streaming Chart.)	45	—		Dark Lane Demo Tapes
"Demons" (featuring Fivio Foreign and Sosa Geek)	2020	21	—	—	177	—	—	—	— (Note: "Demons" did not enter the UK Singles Chart, as chart rules only allow three songs per artist to chart within the top 100 at a time, but peaked at number 51 on the UK Streaming Chart.)	—	—		Dark Lane Demo Tapes
"War"	2020	34	—	—	121	—	—	—	— (Note: "War" did not enter the UK Singles Chart, as chart rules only allow three songs per artist to chart within the top 100 at a time, but peaked at number 53 on the UK Streaming Chart.)	52	—		Dark Lane Demo Tapes
"Wants and Needs" (featuring Lil Baby)	2021	2	15	—	115	8	20	77	10	2	2	ARIA: 2× Platinum; BPI: Gold; RIAA: 5× Platinum	Scary Hours 2
"Lemon Pepper Freestyle" (featuring Rick Ross)	2021	3	26	—	118	11	36	— (Note: "Lemon Pepper Freestyle" did not enter the Swedish Singellista Chart, but peaked at number one on the Sweden Heatseeker Chart.)	6	3	4	ARIA: Gold; BPI: Silver	Scary Hours 2
"Solid" (Young Stoner Life, Young Thug and Gunna featuring Drake)	2021	8	—	—	—	42	— (Note: "Solid" did not enter the NZ Top 40 Singles Chart, but peaked at number one on the NZ Hot Singles Chart.)	— (Note: "Solid" did not enter the Swedish Singellista Chart, but peaked at number 10 on the Sweden Heatseeker Chart.)	36	12	11	RIAA: Gold; BPI: Silver	Slime Language 2
"Seeing Green" (with Nicki Minaj and Lil Wayne)	2021	27	—	—	—	—	— (Note: "Seeing Green" did not enter the NZ Top 40 Singles Chart, but peaked at number seven on the NZ Hot Singles Chart.)	—	42	12	—		Beam Me Up Scotty
"Having Our Way" (Migos featuring Drake)	2021	15	—	—	100	57	— (Note: "Having Our Way" did not enter the NZ Top 40 Singles Chart, but peaked at number four on the NZ Hot Singles Chart.)	— (Note: "Having Our Way" did not enter the Swedish Singellista Chart, but peaked at number 14 on the Sweden Heatseeker Chart.)	49	15	17	RIAA: Gold	Culture III
"Betrayal" (Trippie Redd featuring Drake)	2021	45	—	—	—	—	— (Note: "Betrayal" did not enter the NZ Top 40 Singles Chart, but peaked at number 17 on the NZ Hot Singles Chart.)	—	—	67	—		Trip at Knight
"Champagne Poetry"	2021	3	6	18	22	6	4	32	5	4	5	ARIA: Platinum; BPI: Silver; RIAA: 2× Platinum	Certified Lover Boy
"Papi's Home"	2021	23	8	24	30	—	—	56	— (Note: "Papi's Home" did not enter the UK Singles Chart, as chart rules only allow three songs per artist to chart within the top 100 at a time, but peaked at number 10 on the UK Streaming Chart.)	8	8	ARIA: Gold	Certified Lover Boy
"In the Bible" (featuring Lil Durk and Giveon)	2021	18	14	28	33	—	—	63	— (Note: "In the Bible" did not enter the UK Singles Chart, as chart rules only allow three songs per artist to chart within the top 100 at a time, but peaked at number 8 on the UK Streaming Chart.)	7	9	MC: Platinum; ARIA: Gold; BPI: Silver	Certified Lover Boy
"Love All" (featuring Jay-Z)	2021	20	12	27	34	—	—	57	— (Note: "Love All" did not enter the UK Singles Chart, as chart rules only allow three songs per artist to chart within the top 100 at a time, but peaked at number 7 on the UK Streaming Chart.)	10	10	ARIA: Gold; RIAA: Platinum	Certified Lover Boy
"Fair Trade" (featuring Travis Scott)	2021	4	3	5	14	4	3	17	3	3	4	ARIA: 3× Platinum; BPI: Platinum; RIAA: 5× Platinum	Certified Lover Boy
"TSU"	2021	7	16	38	47	—	—	76	— (Note: "TSU" did not enter the UK Singles Chart, as chart rules only allow three songs per artist to chart within the top 100 at a time, but peaked at number 13 on the UK Streaming Chart.)	9	11	ARIA: Gold; BPI: Silver	Certified Lover Boy
"N 2 Deep" (featuring Future)	2021	24	19	—	58	—	—	— (Note: "N 2 Deep" did not enter the Swedish Singellista Chart, but peaked at number one on the Sweden Heatseeker Chart.)	— (Note: "N 2 Deep" did not enter the UK Singles Chart, as chart rules only allow three songs per artist to chart within the top 100 at a time, but peaked at number 16 on the UK Streaming Chart.)	12	14		Certified Lover Boy
"Pipe Down"	2021	17	23	—	87	—	—	— (Note: "Pipe Down" did not enter the Swedish Singellista Chart, but peaked at number three on the Sweden Heatseeker Chart.)	— (Note: "Pipe Down" did not enter the UK Singles Chart, as chart rules only allow three songs per artist to chart within the top 100 at a time, but peaked at number 20 on the UK Streaming Chart.)	14	15	ARIA: Gold	Certified Lover Boy
"Yebba's Heartbreak" (with Yebba)	2021	43	38	—	94	92	—	— (Note: "Yebba's Heartbreak" did not enter the Swedish Singellista Chart, but peaked at number two on the Sweden Heatseeker Chart.)	— (Note: "Yebba's Heartbreak" did not enter the UK Singles Chart, as chart rules only allow three songs per artist to chart within the top 100 at a time, but peaked at number 31 on the UK Streaming Chart.)	24	24	ARIA: Platinum; BPI: Gold; RIAA: 2× Platinum	Certified Lover Boy
"No Friends in the Industry"	2021	6	18	—	69	—	—	90	— (Note: "No Friends in the Industry" did not enter the UK Singles Chart, as chart rules only allow three songs per artist to chart within the top 100 at a time, but peaked at number 15 on the UK Streaming Chart.)	11	12	ARIA: Gold; RIAA: 2× Platinum	Certified Lover Boy
"7AM on Bridle Path"	2021	10	28	—	108	—	—	— (Note: "7AM on Bridle Path" did not enter the Swedish Singellista Chart, but peaked at number nine on the Sweden Heatseeker Chart.)	— (Note: "7AM on Bridle Path" did not enter the UK Singles Chart, as chart rules only allow three songs per artist to chart within the top 100 at a time, but peaked at number 24 on the UK Streaming Chart.)	16	16		Certified Lover Boy
"Race My Mind"	2021	12	29	—	111	—	—	69	— (Note: "Race My Mind" did not enter the UK Singles Chart, as chart rules only allow three songs per artist to chart within the top 100 at a time, but peaked at number 30 on the UK Streaming Chart.)	18	17		Certified Lover Boy
"Fountains" (featuring Tems)	2021	36	36	—	70	—	—	— (Note: "Fountains" did not enter the Swedish Singellista Chart, but peaked at number seven on the Sweden Heatseeker Chart.)	— (Note: "Fountains" did not enter the UK Singles Chart, as chart rules only allow three songs per artist to chart within the top 100 at a time, but peaked at number 23 on the UK Streaming Chart.)	26	26	ARIA: Gold	Certified Lover Boy
"Get Along Better" (featuring Ty Dolla Sign)	2021	45	41	—	122	—	—	—	— (Note: "Get Along Better" did not enter the UK Singles Chart, as chart rules only allow three songs per artist to chart within the top 100 at a time, but peaked at number 40 on the UK Streaming Chart.)	27	33	BPI: Silver	Certified Lover Boy
"You Only Live Twice" (featuring Lil Wayne and Rick Ross)	2021	38	40	—	139	—	—	— (Note: "You Only Live Twice" did not enter the Swedish Singellista Chart, but peaked at number 17 on the Sweden Heatseeker Chart.)	— (Note: "You Only Live Twice" did not enter the UK Singles Chart, as chart rules only allow three songs per artist to chart within the top 100 at a time, but peaked at number 36 on the UK Streaming Chart.)	25	27		Certified Lover Boy
"IMY2" (featuring Kid Cudi)	2021	37	33	—	120	—	—	— (Note: "IMY2" did not enter the Swedish Singellista Chart, but peaked at number 14 on the Sweden Heatseeker Chart.)	— (Note: "IMY2" did not enter the UK Singles Chart, as chart rules only allow three songs per artist to chart within the top 100 at a time, but peaked at number 38 on the UK Streaming Chart.)	22	25		Certified Lover Boy
"Fucking Fans"	2021	27	46	—	169	—	—	—	— (Note: "Fucking Fans" did not enter the UK Singles Chart, as chart rules only allow three songs per artist to chart within the top 100 at a time, but peaked at number 48 on the UK Streaming Chart.)	32	36		Certified Lover Boy
"The Remorse"	2021	29	56	—	182	—	—	—	— (Note: "The Remorse" did not enter the UK Singles Chart, as chart rules only allow three songs per artist to chart within the top 100 at a time, but peaked at number 53 on the UK Streaming Chart.)	35	38		Certified Lover Boy
"Stars Align" (with Majid Jordan)	2021	56	—	—	—	—	— (Note: "Stars Align" did not enter the NZ Top 40 Singles Chart, but peaked at number 37 on the NZ Hot Singles Chart.)	—	—	—	—		Wildest Dreams
"P Power" (Gunna featuring Drake)	2022	22	—	—	—	81	— (Note: "P Power" did not enter the NZ Top 40 Singles Chart, but peaked at number five on the NZ Hot Singles Chart.)	—	76	24	30	RIAA: Gold; BPI: Silver	DS4Ever
"I'm on One" (Future featuring Drake)	2022	16	—	—	—	56	— (Note: "I'm on One" did not enter the NZ Top 40 Singles Chart, but peaked at number nine on the NZ Hot Singles Chart.)	—	50	11	17	RIAA: Platinum	I Never Liked You
"Churchill Downs" (Jack Harlow featuring Drake)	2022	11	17	—	—	12	25	— (Note: "Churchill Downs" did not enter the Swedish Singellista Chart, but peaked at number 11 on the Swedish Heatseeker Chart.)	19	23	28	ARIA: Platinum; RIAA: Gold	Come Home the Kids Miss You
"Intro"	2022	—	—	—	198	—	—	—	— (Note: "Intro" did not enter the UK Singles Chart, as chart rules only allow three songs per artist to chart within the top 100 at a time, but peaked at number 56 on the UK Streaming Chart.)	—	—		Honestly, Nevermind
"Falling Back"	2022	4	—	28	70	10	14	29	10	7	7		Honestly, Nevermind
"Texts Go Green"	2022	9	—	—	112	—	—	92	— (Note: "Texts Go Green" did not enter the UK Singles Chart, as chart rules only allow three songs per artist to chart within the top 100 at a time, but peaked at number 26 on the UK Streaming Chart.)	13	14		Honestly, Nevermind
"Currents"	2022	15	—	—	182	—	—	— (Note: "Currents" did not enter the Swedish Singellista Chart, but peaked at number 18 on the Swedish Heatseeker Chart.)	— (Note: "Currents" did not enter the UK Singles Chart, as chart rules only allow three songs per artist to chart within the top 100 at a time, but peaked at number 43 on the UK Streaming Chart.)	23	27		Honestly, Nevermind
"A Keeper"	2022	13	—	—	150	—	—	— (Note: "A Keeper" did not enter the Swedish Singellista Chart, but peaked at number eight on the Swedish Heatseeker Chart.)	— (Note: "A Keeper" did not enter the UK Singles Chart, as chart rules only allow three songs per artist to chart within the top 100 at a time, but peaked at number 36 on the UK Streaming Chart.)	21	22		Honestly, Nevermind
"Calling My Name"	2022	14	—	—	138	—	—	— (Note: "Calling My Name" did not enter the Swedish Singellista Chart, but peaked at number seven on the Swedish Heatseeker Chart.)	— (Note: "Calling My Name" did not enter the UK Singles Chart, as chart rules only allow three songs per artist to chart within the top 100 at a time, but peaked at number 35 on the UK Streaming Chart.)	20	23		Honestly, Nevermind
"Flight's Booked"	2022	16	—	—	183	—	—	—	— (Note: "Flight's Booked" did not enter the UK Singles Chart, as chart rules only allow three songs per artist to chart within the top 100 at a time, but peaked at number 40 on the UK Streaming Chart.)	28	32	BPI: Silver	Honestly, Nevermind
"Overdrive"	2022	21	—	—	—	—	—	—	— (Note: "Overdrive" did not enter the UK Singles Chart, as chart rules only allow three songs per artist to chart within the top 100 at a time, but peaked at number 61 on the UK Streaming Chart.)	42	41		Honestly, Nevermind
"Down Hill"	2022	35	—	—	—	—	—	—	— (Note: "Down Hill" did not enter the UK Singles Chart, as chart rules only allow three songs per artist to chart within the top 100 at a time, but peaked at number 77 on the UK Streaming Chart.)	62	55		Honestly, Nevermind
"Tie That Binds"	2022	33	—	—	—	—	—	—	— (Note: "Tie That Binds" did not enter the UK Singles Chart, as chart rules only allow three songs per artist to chart within the top 100 at a time, but peaked at number 76 on the UK Streaming Chart.)	66	53		Honestly, Nevermind
"Liability"	2022	34	—	—	—	—	—	—	— (Note: "Liability" did not enter the UK Singles Chart, as chart rules only allow three songs per artist to chart within the top 100 at a time, but peaked at number 89 on the UK Streaming Chart.)	47	50		Honestly, Nevermind
"No Secret" (DJ Khaled featuring Drake)	2022	74	—	—	—	—	—	—	—	78	146		God Did
"Major Distribution" (with 21 Savage)	2022	3	10	27	85	5	4	41	5	3	3	ARIA: Gold; RIAA: Platinum	Her Loss
"On BS" (with 21 Savage)	2022	4	39	36	118	—	8	57	— (Note: "On BS" did not enter the UK Singles Chart, as chart rules only allow three songs per artist to chart within the top 100 at a time, but peaked at number 10 on the UK Streaming Chart.)	4	5	ARIA: Gold; BPI: Silver; RIAA: 2× Platinum	Her Loss
"BackOutsideBoyz"	2022	8	82	—	127	—	—	46	— (Note: "BackOutsideBoyz" did not enter the UK Singles Chart, as chart rules only allow three songs per artist to chart within the top 100 at a time, but peaked at number 17 on the UK Streaming Chart.)	9	10	RIAA: Platinum	Her Loss
"Privileged Rappers" (with 21 Savage)	2022	10	78	—	148	—	—	81	— (Note: "Privileged Rappers" did not enter the UK Singles Chart, as chart rules only allow three songs per artist to chart within the top 100 at a time, but peaked at number 23 on the UK Streaming Chart.)	7	9	ARIA: Gold; RIAA: Platinum	Her Loss
"Hours in Silence" (with 21 Savage)	2022	13	—	—	177	—	—	— (Note: "Hours in Silence" did not enter the Swedish Singellista Chart, but peaked at number four on the Swedish Heatseeker Chart.)	— (Note: "Hours in Silence" did not enter the UK Singles Chart, as chart rules only allow three songs per artist to chart within the top 100 at a time, but peaked at number 27 on the UK Streaming Chart.)	11	13	RIAA: 2× Platinum	Her Loss
"Treacherous Twins" (with 21 Savage)	2022	14	—	—	—	—	—	— (Note: "Treacherous Twins" did not enter the Swedish Singellista Chart, but peaked at number three on the Swedish Heatseeker Chart.)	— (Note: "Treacherous Twins" did not enter the UK Singles Chart, as chart rules only allow three songs per artist to chart within the top 100 at a time, but peaked at number 28 on the UK Streaming Chart.)	14	14		Her Loss
"Pussy & Millions" (with 21 Savage featuring Travis Scott)	2022	6	5	20	96	95	5	47	— (Note: "Pussy & Millions" did not enter the UK Singles Chart, as chart rules only allow three songs per artist to chart within the top 100 at a time, but peaked at number 9 on the UK Streaming Chart.)	6	6	ARIA: Gold; BPI: Silver; RIAA: 2× Platinum	Her Loss
"Broke Boys" (with 21 Savage)	2022	12	87	—	—	—	—	— (Note: "Broke Boys" did not enter the Swedish Singellista Chart, but peaked at number one on the Swedish Heatseeker Chart.)	— (Note: "Broke Boys" did not enter the UK Singles Chart, as chart rules only allow three songs per artist to chart within the top 100 at a time, but peaked at number 29 on the UK Streaming Chart.)	12	12	RIAA: Platinum	Her Loss
"Middle of the Ocean"	2022	15	—	—	—	—	—	— (Note: "Middle of the Ocean" did not enter the Swedish Singellista Chart, but peaked at number eight on the Swedish Heatseeker Chart.)	— (Note: "Middle of the Ocean" did not enter the UK Singles Chart, as chart rules only allow three songs per artist to chart within the top 100 at a time, but peaked at number 36 on the UK Streaming Chart.)	15	17		Her Loss
"Jumbotron Shit Poppin"	2022	16	—	—	—	—	—	— (Note: "Jumbotron Shit Poppin" did not enter the Swedish Singellista Chart, but peaked at number 20 on the Swedish Heatseeker Chart.)	— (Note: "Jumbotron Shit Poppin" did not enter the UK Singles Chart, as chart rules only allow three songs per artist to chart within the top 100 at a time, but peaked at number 44 on the UK Streaming Chart.)	16	21	RIAA: Platinum	Her Loss
"More M's" (with 21 Savage)	2022	17	—	—	—	—	—	—	— (Note: "More M's" did not enter the UK Singles Chart, as chart rules only allow three songs per artist to chart within the top 100 at a time, but peaked at number 50 on the UK Streaming Chart.)	18	28		Her Loss
"I Guess It's Fuck Me"	2022	25	—	—	—	—	—	—	— (Note: "I Guess It's Fuck Me" did not enter the UK Singles Chart, as chart rules only allow three songs per artist to chart within the top 100 at a time, but peaked at number 64 on the UK Streaming Chart.)	19	40		Her Loss
"Parade on Cleveland" (Young Thug featuring Drake)	2023	44	—	—	—	—	— (Note: "Parade on Cleveland" did not enter the NZ Top 40 Singles Chart, but peaked at number eight on the NZ Hot Singles Chart.)	—	97	39	76		Business Is Business
"Virginia Beach"	2023	3	9	21	36	10	7	41	6	3	4	RIAA: 2× Platinum	For All the Dogs
"Amen" (featuring Teezo Touchdown)	2023	17	24	—	80	—	32	— (Note: "Amen" did not enter the Swedish Singellista Chart, but peaked at number eight on the Swedish Heatseeker Chart.)	— (Note: "Amen" did not enter the UK Singles Chart, as chart rules only allow three songs per artist to chart within the top 100 at a time, but peaked at number 30 on the UK Streaming Chart.)	15	18		For All the Dogs
"Calling for You" (featuring 21 Savage)	2023	6	17	—	55	—	21	85	— (Note: "Calling for You" did not enter the UK Singles Chart, as chart rules only allow three songs per artist to chart within the top 100 at a time, but peaked at number 19 on the UK Streaming Chart.)	5	9		For All the Dogs
"Fear of Heights"	2023	8	22	—	90	—	28	— (Note: "Fear of Heights" did not enter the Swedish Singellista Chart, but peaked at number six on the Swedish Heatseeker Chart.)	— (Note: "Fear of Heights" did not enter the UK Singles Chart, as chart rules only allow three songs per artist to chart within the top 100 at a time, but peaked at number 24 on the UK Streaming Chart.)	10	13		For All the Dogs
"Daylight"	2023	5	21	—	96	—	26	— (Note: "Daylight" did not enter the Swedish Singellista Chart, but peaked at number four on the Swedish Heatseeker Chart.)	— (Note: "Daylight" did not enter the UK Singles Chart, as chart rules only allow three songs per artist to chart within the top 100 at a time, but peaked at number 25 on the UK Streaming Chart.)	8	12		For All the Dogs
"IDGAF" (featuring Yeat)	2023	1	6	25	25	9	6	43	5	2	1	ARIA: Gold	For All the Dogs
"7969 Santa"	2023	16	66	—	103	—	—	— (Note: "7969 Santa" did not enter the Swedish Singellista Chart, but peaked at number 20 on the Swedish Heatseeker Chart.)	— (Note: "7969 Santa" did not enter the UK Singles Chart, as chart rules only allow three songs per artist to chart within the top 100 at a time, but peaked at number 34 on the UK Streaming Chart.)	16	19		For All the Dogs
"Bahamas Promises"	2023	25	94	—	144	—	—	—	— (Note: "Bahamas Promises" did not enter the UK Singles Chart, as chart rules only allow three songs per artist to chart within the top 100 at a time, but peaked at number 42 on the UK Streaming Chart.)	20	26		For All the Dogs
"Tried Our Best"	2023	24	95	—	167	—	—	—	— (Note: "Tried Our Best" did not enter the UK Singles Chart, as chart rules only allow three songs per artist to chart within the top 100 at a time, but peaked at number 44 on the UK Streaming Chart.)	21	27		For All the Dogs
"Screw the World" (interlude)	2023	46	—	—	—	—	—	—	—	42	66		For All the Dogs
"Drew a Picasso"	2023	28	58	—	200	—	—	—	— (Note: "Drew a Picasso" did not enter the UK Singles Chart, as chart rules only allow three songs per artist to chart within the top 100 at a time, but peaked at number 56 on the UK Streaming Chart.)	27	32		For All the Dogs
"Members Only" (featuring PartyNextDoor)	2023	23	40	—	159	—	—	—	— (Note: "Members Only" did not enter the UK Singles Chart, as chart rules only allow three songs per artist to chart within the top 100 at a time, but peaked at number 36 on the UK Streaming Chart.)	24	24		For All the Dogs
"What Would Pluto Do"	2023	21	53	—	—	—	—	—	— (Note: "What Would Pluto Do" did not enter the UK Singles Chart, as chart rules only allow three songs per artist to chart within the top 100 at a time, but peaked at number 47 on the UK Streaming Chart.)	18	28		For All the Dogs
"All the Parties" (featuring Chief Keef)	2023	27	68	—	—	—	—	—	— (Note: "All the Parties" did not enter the UK Singles Chart, as chart rules only allow three songs per artist to chart within the top 100 at a time, but peaked at number 61 on the UK Streaming Chart.)	26	30		For All the Dogs
"BBL Love" (interlude)	2023	43	—	—	—	—	—	—	—	36	56		For All the Dogs
"Gently" (featuring Bad Bunny)	2023	12	94	36	—	—	—	53	— (Note: "Gently" did not enter the UK Singles Chart, as chart rules only allow three songs per artist to chart within the top 100 at a time, but peaked at number 45 on the UK Streaming Chart.)	12	10		For All the Dogs
"Another Late Night" (featuring Lil Yachty)	2023	26	67	—	—	—	—	—	— (Note: "Another Late Night" did not enter the UK Singles Chart, as chart rules only allow three songs per artist to chart within the top 100 at a time, but peaked at number 75 on the UK Streaming Chart.)	29	35		For All the Dogs
"Away from Home"	2023	33	99	—	—	—	—	—	— (Note: "Away from Home" did not enter the UK Singles Chart, as chart rules only allow three songs per artist to chart within the top 100 at a time, but peaked at number 87 on the UK Streaming Chart.)	32	47		For All the Dogs
"Polar Opposites"	2023	40	—	—	—	—	—	—	— (Note: "Polar Opposites" did not enter the UK Singles Chart, as chart rules only allow three songs per artist to chart within the top 100 at a time, but peaked at number 96 on the UK Streaming Chart.)	37	55		For All the Dogs
"Red Button"	2023	47	—	—	—	—	— (Note: "The Shoe Fits" did not enter the NZ Top 40 Singles Chart, but peaked at number eight on the NZ Hot Singles Chart.)	—	—	51	86		For All the Dogs Scary Hours Edition
"Stories About My Brother"	2023	53	—	—	—	—	—	—	—	58	112		For All the Dogs Scary Hours Edition
"The Shoe Fits"	2023	48	—	—	—	—	— (Note: "Red Button" did not enter the NZ Top 40 Singles Chart, but peaked at number seven on the NZ Hot Singles Chart.)	—	—	52	90		For All the Dogs Scary Hours Edition
"Wick Man"	2023	60	—	—	—	—	—	—	—	71	191		For All the Dogs Scary Hours Edition
"Evil Ways" (featuring J. Cole)	2023	31	—	—	—	—	— (Note: "Evil Ways" did not enter the NZ Top 40 Singles Chart, but peaked at number five on the NZ Hot Singles Chart.)	—	—	26	50		For All the Dogs Scary Hours Edition
"Needle" (Nicki Minaj featuring Drake)	2023	32	—	—	—	—	— (Note: "Needle" did not enter the NZ Top 40 Singles Chart, but peaked at number six on the NZ Hot Singles Chart.)	—	58	34	43		Pink Friday 2
"Uuugly"	2024	77	—	—	—	—	— (Note: "Uuugly" did not enter the NZ Top 40 Singles Chart, but peaked at number 13 on the NZ Hot Singles Chart.)	—	—	— (Note: "Uuugly" did not enter the Billboard Hot 100, but peaked at number 17 on the Bubbling Under Hot 100 chart.)	—		C,XOXO
"It's Up" (with Young Thug and 21 Savage)	2024	24	—	—	—	94	— (Note: "It's Up" did not enter the NZ Top 40 Singles Chart, but peaked at number three on the NZ Hot Singles Chart.)	—	82	28	47		100 Gigs
"Blue Green Red"	2024	33	—	—	—	—	— (Note: "Blue Green Red" did not enter the NZ Top 40 Singles Chart, but peaked at number six on the NZ Hot Singles Chart.)	—	87	63	158		100 Gigs
"Housekeeping Knows" (featuring Latto)	2024	72	—	—	—	—	— (Note: "Housekeeping Knows" did not enter the NZ Top 40 Singles Chart, but peaked at number 14 on the NZ Hot Singles Chart.)	—	—	85	—		100 Gigs
"Circadian Rhythm"	2024	42	—	—	—	—	— (Note: "Circadian Rhythm" did not enter the NZ Top 40 Singles Chart, but peaked at number four on the NZ Hot Singles Chart.)	—	71	59	148	BPI: Silver	100 Gigs
"No Face"	2024	50	—	—	—	—	— (Note: "No Face" did not enter the NZ Top 40 Singles Chart, but peaked at number three on the NZ Hot Singles Chart.)	—	—	60	144		100 Gigs
"CN Tower" (with PartyNextDoor)	2025	13	38	—	—	—	— (Note: "CN Tower" did not enter the NZ Top 40 Singles Chart, but peaked at number five on the NZ Hot Singles Chart.)	—	22	18	26	RIAA: Gold	Some Sexy Songs 4 U
"Moth Balls" (with PartyNextDoor)	2025	24	68	—	—	—	—	—	—	29	38		Some Sexy Songs 4 U
"Something About You" (with PartyNextDoor)	2025	28	81	—	—	—	—	—	—	26	37	RIAA: Gold	Some Sexy Songs 4 U
"Crying in Chanel"	2025	35	91	—	—	—	—	—	—	37	53		Some Sexy Songs 4 U
"Spider-Man Superman" (with PartyNextDoor)	2025	36	—	—	—	—	—	—	—	35	51	RIAA: Gold	Some Sexy Songs 4 U
"Small Town Fame"	2025	39	—	—	—	—	—	—	—	40	58		Some Sexy Songs 4 U
"Pimmie's Dilemma" (with PartyNextDoor and Pim)	2025	41	—	—	—	—	—	—	—	45	57		Some Sexy Songs 4 U
"Brian Steel"	2025	42	—	—	—	—	—	—	—	47	73		Some Sexy Songs 4 U
"Raining in Houston"	2025	43	—	—	—	—	—	—	—	43	67	RIAA: Gold	Some Sexy Songs 4 U
"Lasers" (with PartyNextDoor)	2025	49	—	—	—	—	—	—	—	60	105		Some Sexy Songs 4 U
"Meet Your Padre" (with PartyNextDoor and Chino Pacas)	2025	44	—	—	—	—	—	—	—	63	103		Some Sexy Songs 4 U
"Celibacy" (with PartyNextDoor)	2025	55	—	—	—	—	—	—	—	66	132		Some Sexy Songs 4 U
"OMW" (with PartyNextDoor)	2025	58	—	—	—	—	—	—	—	74	172		Some Sexy Songs 4 U
"Glorious" (with PartyNextDoor)	2025	68	—	—	—	—	—	—	—	83	—		Some Sexy Songs 4 U
"When He's Gone" (with PartyNextDoor)	2025	62	—	—	—	—	—	—	—	73	173		Some Sexy Songs 4 U
"Greedy" (with PartyNextDoor)	2025	57	—	—	—	—	—	—	—	70	146		Some Sexy Songs 4 U
"Mr. Recoup" (with 21 Savage)	2025	44	—	—	—	—	— (Note: "Mr. Recoup" did not enter the NZ Top 40 Singles Chart, but peaked at number two on the NZ Hot Singles Chart.)	—	—	51	77		What Happened to the Streets?
"Rusty Intro"	2026	72	—	—	—	—	—	—	—	71	158		Habibti
"WNBA"	2026	26	58	—	—	—	— (Note: "WNBA" did not enter the NZ Top 40 Singles Chart, but peaked at number 7 on the NZ Hot Singles Chart.)	—	—	28	34		Habibti
"Slap the City" (with Qendresa)	2026	40	83	—	—	—	— (Note: "Slap the City" did not enter the NZ Top 40 Singles Chart, but peaked at number 11 on the NZ Hot Singles Chart.)	—	—	39	60		Habibti
"High Fives"	2026	35	93	—	—	—	—	—	—	43	69		Habibti
"Hurrr Nor Thurrr" (with Sexyy Red)	2026	60	—	—	—	—	—	—	—	61	115		Habibti
"I'm Spent" (with Loe Shimmy)	2026	55	—	—	—	—	—	—	—	34	63		Habibti
"Classic"	2026	17	86	—	—	—	— (Note: "Classic" did not enter the NZ Top 40 Singles Chart, but peaked at number 9 on the NZ Hot Singles Chart.)	—	—	28	57		Habibti
"Gen 5"	2026	59	—	—	—	—	—	—	—	56	109		Habibti
"White Bone"	2026	61	—	—	—	—	—	—	—	57	110		Habibti
"Fortworth" (with PartyNextDoor)	2026	36	79	—	—	—	— (Note: "Fortworth" did not enter the NZ Top 40 Singles Chart, but peaked at number 8 on the NZ Hot Singles Chart.)	—	—	36	54		Habibti
"Prioritizing"	2026	83	—	—	—	—	—	—	—	82	—		Habibti
"Make Them Cry"	2026	7	9	—	—	10	13	21	6	7	6		Iceman
"Dust"	2026	8	10	—	—	—	17	46	—	8	7		Iceman
"Whisper My Name"	2026	4	6	—	—	45	7	26	—	3	3		Iceman
"Ran to Atlanta" (featuring Future and Molly Santana)	2026	2	11	—	—	—	14	31	—	2	2		Iceman
"Make Them Pay"	2026	11	31	—	—	—	28	68	—	10	12		Iceman
"Burning Bridges"	2026	13	38	—	—	—	38	— (Note: "Burning Bridges" did not enter the Swedish Singellista Chart, but peaked at number 1 on the Swedish Heatseeker Chart.)	—	13	16		Iceman
"National Treasures"	2026	3	4	—	—	3	4	12	3	6	4		Iceman
"B's on the Table" (featuring 21 Savage)	2026	12	32	—	—	—	31	87	—	12	15		Iceman
"Plot Twist"	2026	9	18	—	—	—	21	44	—	11	11		Iceman
"Make Them Remember"	2026	16	44	—	—	—	—	— (Note: "Make Them Remember" did not enter the Swedish Singellista Chart, but peaked at number 8 on the Swedish Heatseeker Chart.)	—	19	22		Iceman
"Little Birdie"	2026	15	53	—	—	—	—	— (Note: "Little Birdie" did not enter the Swedish Singellista Chart, but peaked at number 17 on the Swedish Heatseeker Chart.)	—	18	24		Iceman
"Don't Worry"	2026	20	56	—	—	—	—	— (Note: "Don't Worry" did not enter the Swedish Singellista Chart, but peaked at number 12 on the Swedish Heatseeker Chart.)	—	23	30		Iceman
"Firm Friends"	2026	25	61	—	—	—	—	—	—	31	35		Iceman
"Make Them Know"	2026	17	42	—	—	—	—	— (Note: "Make Them Know" did not enter the Swedish Singellista Chart, but peaked at number 3 on the Swedish Heatseeker Chart.)	—	21	25		Iceman
"Hoe Phase"	2026	22	57	—	—	—	— (Note: "Hoe Phase" did not enter the NZ Top 40 Singles Chart, but peaked at number 6 on the NZ Hot Singles Chart.)	—	—	22	32		Maid of Honour
"Road Trips"	2026	28	90	—	—	—	— (Note: "Road Trips" did not enter the NZ Top 40 Singles Chart, but peaked at number 10 on the NZ Hot Singles Chart.)	—	—	42	58		Maid of Honour
"Outside Tweaking" (featuring Stunna Sandy)	2026	56	—	—	—	—	—	—	—	65	145		Maid of Honour
"Cheetah Print" (with Sexyy Red)	2026	31	84	—	—	—	— (Note: "Cheetah Print" did not enter the NZ Top 40 Singles Chart, but peaked at number 12 on the NZ Hot Singles Chart.)	—	—	41	70		Maid of Honour
"Amazing Shape" (featuring Popcaan)	2026	43	—	—	—	—	—	—	—	76	154		Maid of Honour
"BBW"	2026	54	—	—	—	—	—	—	—	74	157		Maid of Honour
"True Bestie" (featuring Iconic Savvy)	2026	58	—	—	—	—	—	—	—	67	164		Maid of Honour
"New Bestie"	2026	50	—	—	—	—	— (Note: "New Bestie" did not enter the NZ Top 40 Singles Chart, but peaked at number 13 on the NZ Hot Singles Chart.)	—	—	72	125		Maid of Honour
"Q&A"	2026	63	—	—	—	—	—	—	—	85	—		Maid of Honour
"Stuck"	2026	69	—	—	—	—	—	—	—	93	—		Maid of Honour
"Goose and the Juice"	2026	75	—	—	—	—	—	—	—	88	—		Maid of Honour
"Princess"	2026	80	—	—	—	—	—	—	—	92	—		Maid of Honour
"Solar Eclipse" (featuring Don Toliver)	2026	6	48	—	—	48	36	— (Note: "Solar Eclipse" did not enter the Swedish Singellista Chart, but peaked at number 3 on the Swedish Heatseeker Chart.)	22	5	8		Habibti (FOMO)
"Quebec"	2026	5	90	—	—	67	— (Note: "Quebec" did not enter the NZ Top 40 Singles Chart, but peaked at number 4 on the NZ Hot Singles Chart.)	—	27	11	20		Habibti (FOMO)
"Cold Shoulder" (featuring Don Toliver and Yebba)	2026	7	82	—	—	69	— (Note: "Cold Shoulder" did not enter the NZ Top 40 Singles Chart, but peaked at number 3 on the NZ Hot Singles Chart.)	—	36	18	28		Habibti (FOMO)
"Classic PT2"	2026	—	—	—	—	—	— (Note: "Classic PT2" did not enter the NZ Top 40 Singles Chart, but peaked at number 7 on the NZ Hot Singles Chart.)	—	—	—	—		Habibti (FOMO)
"—" denotes a recording that did not chart or was not released in that territory.

== Guest appearances ==
List of non-single and album guest appearances, with other performing artists, showing year released and album name
Title	Year	Other artist(s)	Album
"Soul Searching"	2005	Roshana	Roshana
"Do What You Do"	2006	—N/a	The N Soundtrack
"With You (Remix)"	2007	JDiggz, George Nozuka	Memoirs of a Playbwoy
"Get Dat $$$ Y'all"	2007	Gangalee	Vintage Roots
"Change You"	2008	Jenna	The Radio Singles
"Stuntin'"	2008	Lil Wayne	Dedication 3
"Off That"	2009	Jay-Z	The Blueprint 3
"I'm Still Fly"	2009	Page	Total Club Hits, Vol. 3
"Forever"	2009	Eminem, Kanye West, Lil Wayne	More than a Game (soundtrack) and Relapse: Refill
"Street Cred"	2009	Gucci Mane, Killer Mike	The Cold War: Part 1 (Guccimerica)
"Take You Down (YM Remix)"	2009	Jae Millz	The Virgo Mixtape
"Cannonball" (Remix)	2009	Gudda Gudda, Colin Munroe, Jae Millz	Guddaville
"Mo Milly"	2009	Birdman, Bun B	Priceless
"It's Been a Pleasure"	2010	Bun B	Trill OG
"Gonorrhea"	2010	Lil Wayne	I Am Not a Human Being
"With You"	2010	Lil Wayne	I Am Not a Human Being
"Faith"	2010	k-os	The Anchorman Mixtape
"Wavin' Flag"	2010	Young Artists for Haiti	—N/a
"Lose My Mind" (Remix)	2010	Young Jeezy	—N/a
"Made"	2010	Big Sean	Finally Famous Vol. 3: Big
"Made Men"	2010	Rick Ross	Ashes to Ashes
"Deuces (All-Star Remix)"	2010	Chris Brown, Kanye West, André 3000, Fabolous, Rick Ross, T.I.	—N/a
"All of the Lights" (Remix)	2011	Kanye West, Lil Wayne, Big Sean	—N/a
"July"	2011	Jhené Aiko	Sailing Soul(s)
"Some Other Place"	2011	Verbal	Visionair
"Good Girls Go Bad"	2011	Game	The R.E.D. Album
"Sunflower"	2011	Lenny Kravitz	Black and White America
"In the Morning"	2011	J. Cole	Friday Night Lights and Cole World: The Sideline Story
"The Zone"	2011	The Weeknd	Thursday
"I Do" (Remix)	2012	Young Jeezy, Jay Z, André 3000	—N/a
"Champion"	2012	Nicki Minaj, Nas, Young Jeezy	Pink Friday: Roman Reloaded
"Waiting Up"	2012	Riz	—N/a
"Come Up"	2012	Game, Lifestyle	California Republic
"The Notice"	2012	Celeb Forever	Make Believers
"We Are (Family)"	2012	Keke Palmer	Ice Age: Continental Drift
"Us"	2012	Rick Ross, Lil Reese	The Black Bar Mitzvah
"Fo Real"	2013	Future	FBG: The Movie
"Number 15"	2013	Nickelus F	Vices
"Killer"	2013	Nipsey Hussle	Nip Hussle The Great: Vol 1
"Versace" (Remix)	2013	Migos	—N/a
"I Do It"	2013	2 Chainz, Lil Wayne	B.O.A.T.S. II: Me Time
"Cabaret"	2013	Justin Timberlake	The 20/20 Experience – 2 of 2
"Mine"	2013	Beyoncé	Beyoncé
"Shit" (Megamix)	2013	Mike Will Made It, Future, Juicy J, Diddy, Schoolboy Q, Pastor Troy, Jeezy, T.I.	#MikeWillBeenTrill
"We Made It" (Remix)	2014	Soulja Boy	King Soulja 2
"Never Satisfied"	2014	Future	Honest
"Schemin' Up"	2014	OB O'Brien, P. Reign	—N/a
"Tell Me Why"	2014	Rich Homie Quan	—N/a
"Used To"	2015	Lil Wayne	Sorry 4 the Wait 2 and If You're Reading This It's Too Late
"My Way" (Remix)	2015	Fetty Wap	—N/a
"Tryna Fuck"	2015	Juicy J, Ty Dolla Sign	Pure THC: The Hustle Continues
"3 On"	2015	Schoolboy Q, Tinashe	Schoolboy Q 2
"Ojuelegba (Remix)"	2015	Wizkid, Skepta	—N/a
"Drama"	2015	Roy Wood$	Exis
"Empire"	2016	J.U.S.T.I.C.E. League, Rick Ross	J.U.S.T.I.C.E. For All
"100it Racks"	2016	DJ Esco, Future, 2 Chainz	Project E.T.
"Family Feud"	2017	Lil Wayne	Dedication 6
"Never Recover"	2018	Lil Baby, Gunna	Drip Harder
"Flip the Switch"	2018	Quavo	Quavo Huncho
"All I Need"	2020	Popcaan	Fixtape
"Solid"	2021	YSL Records, Young Thug, Gunna	Slime Language 2
"Having Our Way"	2021	Migos	Culture III
"Betrayal"	2021	Trippie Redd	Trip at Knight (Complete Edition)
"Stars Align"	2021	Majid Jordan	Wildest Dreams
"P Power"	2022	Gunna	DS4Ever
"I'm on One"	2022	Future	I Never Liked You
"Churchill Downs"	2022	Jack Harlow	Come Home the Kids Miss You
"No Secret"	2022	DJ Khaled	God Did
"Parade on Cleveland"	2023	Young Thug	Business Is Business
"Needle"	2023	Nicki Minaj	Pink Friday 2
"As We Speak"	2024	Yeat	2093 (P2)
"Uuugly"	2024	—N/a	C,XOXO
"Mr. Recoup"	2025	21 Savage	What Happened to the Streets?
"Ahí"	2026	Karol G	No Me Arrepiento de Sentir Tanto
"Miss My Dawg"	2026	Yeat	Cocoon

== See also ==
- Drake albums discography
- Drake videography
