= Sakina =

Quranic term for peace or serenity

Sakina or Sakinah (Arabic: سـكـن) is an Arabic word based on a Semitic root, through which it is also related to a Hebrew derivative. In Arabic it conotes "peace", "serenity" or "tranquility". Several words based on the root s-k-n appear in the Qur'an. The Hebrew term "shekhinah" literally means "dwelling" or "settling", and in Judaism's Talmudic literature denotes the presence of God in a place.

According to Abd al-Aziz Ibn Baz, in his commentary of Sahih al-Bukhari Hadith which were transmitted by Usayd ibn Hudayr, Sakina is an angel who brings tranquility to the reciters of Quran.

== Usage in the Qur’an ==
Sakina is the spirit of tranquility, or peace of reassurance. It is a derivative of the original word "Sakina" which is mentioned in the Qur'an as having descended upon the Islamic Prophet (Arabic: نَـبِي, nabi) Muhammad and the believers as they made an unarmed pilgrimage to Mecca, and were faced with an opposing military force of the Quraysh, with whom Muhammad struck the Treaty of Hudaybiyah. "He it is Who sent down the sakina into the hearts of the believers that they might add faith unto their faith" (48:4).

Another Qur'anic association with the concord of dwellings in peace coincides with the attribution of the Sakinah to matrimonial concord under the tent of Sarah: "And God gave you your houses as a quiescent place (Arabic: سَـكَـنًـا, sakanan) (16:80).

Sakinah is further mentioned in the following verse: "While the Unbelievers got up in their hearts heat and cant - the heat and cant of ignorance,- Allah sent down Sakīnaṫahu (Arabic: سـكـيـنـتـه, His Tranquility) to his Messenger and to the Believers, and made them stick close to the command of self-restraint; and well were they entitled to it and worthy of it. And Allah has full knowledge of all things" (48:26).

Another Qur'anic verse portrays sakinah as reassurance: "Allah's Good Pleasure was on the Believers when they swore Fealty to thee under the Tree: He knew what was in their hearts, and He sent down Sakina - tranquillity (alssakeenata) to them; and He rewarded them with a speedy Victory" (48:18).

== Arabic Sakinah and Hebrew Shekhinah ==
Karen Armstrong notes: "The sakinah it will also be recalled, seems to be related to the Hebrew Shekhinah (Biblical Hebrew: שכינה), the term for God's presence in the world."

The root of the word is sa-ka-nah, which means "dwelled" or "remained in place". This further supports the association with the Shekhinah as "indwelling". The fact that the word is preceded by "al" (the) shows that it does not denote a name, but has an abstract meaning.

Sufi writings, in expounding the inner peace of Sufi contemplation, which dwells in a sanctuary or in the heart, confirm the association with both Sakinah and the Shekhinah. Sufi reference to sa-ka-na as meaning both stillness and habitation adds to the identity with Shekhinah's indwelling nature.

== See also ==
- Shekhinah of Judaism
- Shakti of Hinduism
