= List of Pakistani television and theatre directors =

This is a list of Pakistani television and theatre directors.

== A ==
- Angeline Malik
- Ammar Aziz

== B ==
- Bushra Farrukh
- Bilal Lashari

== D ==
- Danish Nawaz

== F ==
- Faisal Qureshi
- Faizan Peerzada
- Farooq Qaiser

== H ==
- Haissam Hussain
- Haseeb Hassan

== J ==
- Javed Sheikh
- Jawad Bashir

== M ==
- M. Akram
- Marina Khan
- Mehreen Jabbar
- Mohammed Ehteshamuddin
- Momina Duraid
- Nabeel
- Nabeel Qureshi
- Nadia Afghan
- Noman Masood

== R ==
- Rahat Kazmi
- Rauf Khalid

== S ==
- Savera Nadeem
- Shahid Nadeem
- Shoaib Mansoor
- Sultana Siddiqui
- Saife Hasan

== U ==
- Usman Peerzada
- Umair Haroon

== Y ==
- Yasir Nawaz
- Yawar Hayat Khan

== See also ==
- Pakistan Television
- List of Pakistani Actors
- List of Pakistani film directors
- Lollywood
