= Drake albums discography =

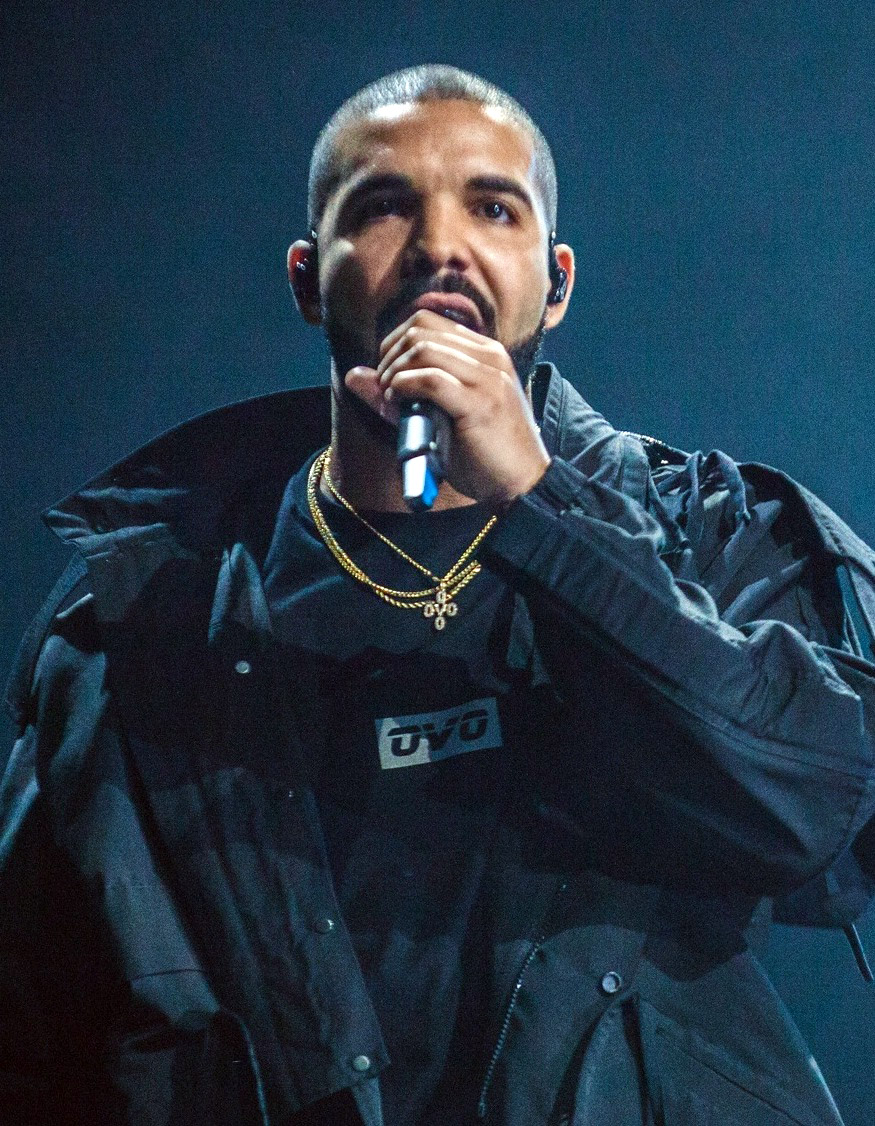
- Drake performing at his Summer Sixteen Tour in Toronto; 2016
- Studio albums: 11
- EPs: 5
- Collaborative albums: 2
- Compilation albums: 1
- Mixtapes: 7

The Canadian rapper and singer Drake has released eleven studio albums, two collaborative albums, one compilation album, four extended plays, seven mixtapes, and two reissues. His music has been released on record labels Universal Motown Records and Republic Records, along with subsidiaries Young Money Entertainment, Cash Money Records and OVO Sound. With 170 million records sold worldwide, he is among the best-selling music artists in history. Drake has achieved fifteen number-one albums on the Billboard 200. Billboard hailed him as the "Artist of the 2010s Decade" and the 16th Greatest Artist of all time. RIAA ranks him as the most certified artist of all time with 350 million in the United States.

Following him signing to Young Money Entertainment imprint, Drake's mixtape, So Far Gone was repackaged as a 2009 release of his seven-song extended play. The EP peaked at number 6 on the US Billboard 200, and later became certified gold by the Recording Industry Association of America (RIAA). In June 2010, Drake released his debut studio album, Thank Me Later. It debuted atop both the Billboard 200 and the Canadian Albums Chart, and later became certified platinum by both the Recording Industry Association of America (RIAA) and Canadian Recording Industry Association (CRIA).

In November 2011, Drake released his second studio album, Take Care, which debuted at number one in both the United States and Canada, becoming his second album to achieve this feat. In September 2013, Drake released his third studio album, Nothing Was the Same, becoming his third consecutive number-one album in Canada and the US.

In 2015, Drake released two mixtapes, If You're Reading This It's Too Late which became available for purchase in February and a surprise joint mixtape with Future, What a Time to Be Alive, which was released in September. Drake's fourth studio album Views was released in April 2016, once again debuting at number one in both the United States and Canada, while also debuting at number one in the United Kingdom, where it became his first number one album. The album achieved huge commercial success, becoming the most popular release of 2016 in the US.

Drake's fifth studio album, Scorpion, was released in June 2018 and again debuted at number one in Canada and in the US. The album was certified platinum on the day it was released and became the first album to be streamed over one billion times in its release week. It sold 732,000 album-equivalent units, which included 160,000 pure album sales, making it the biggest first week of the year. In August 2019, Drake released a compilation album, Care Package which debuted at number one in Canada and the US, moving 109,000 album-equivalent units in the latter.

He released his seventh mixtape Dark Lane Demo Tapes, in May 2020. The mixtape sold 223,000 album-equivalent units, however, it debuted at number two in the US, marking his first project since So Far Gone (2009) to not top the chart. In September 2021, Drake released his sixth studio album, Certified Lover Boy. The album sold 613,000 album-equivalent units, peaking at number one in several countries including Canada and the US. Drake became the first artist to have ten chart-topping albums with the release. The album was the tenth best-selling album of 2022, moving 1,197,000 album-equivalent units. In 2022, Drake achieved his eleventh and twelfth chart-topping albums: Honestly, Nevermind (June 2022) which moved 204,000 album-equivalent units and Her Loss with 21 Savage (November 2022) which moved 404,000 album-equivalent units; the latter becoming the thirteenth best-selling album of 2023, moving a total of 1,337,000 album-equivalent units. In October 2023, Drake released his eighth studio album, For All the Dogs which opened with 402,000 album-equivalent units and topped the Billboard 200 chart, marking the year's highest-selling rap album. In February 2025, Drake released a collaborative studio album titled Some Sexy Songs 4 U, with PartyNextDoor. The album debuted at number one in the US, moving 246,000 album-equivalent units in its first week.

On April 21, 2026, Drake announced his ninth studio album Iceman. On May 15, 2026, Drake released his ninth, tenth, and eleventh studio albums at once: Iceman, Maid of Honour, and Habibti.

== Studio albums ==
=== Solo albums ===
List of studio albums, with selected chart positions, sales figures and certifications
Title	Album details	Peak chart positions										Sales	Certifications
Title	Album details	CAN	AUS	DEN	FRA	IRE	NZ	NOR	SWE	UK	US	Sales	Certifications
Thank Me Later	Released: June 15, 2010; Label: Young Money, Cash Money, Universal Motown; Formats: CD, LP, digital download, streaming	1	81	—	117	32	35	—	—	15	1	CAN: 176,000; UK: 219,053; US: 1,830,000	MC: 2× Platinum; BPI: Platinum; RIAA: 4× Platinum; RMNZ: Gold
Take Care	Released: November 15, 2011; Label: Young Money, Cash Money, Republic; Formats: CD, LP, digital download, streaming	1	15	24	32	30	19	32	55	5	1	CAN: 262,000; UK: 400,450; US: 2,338,000	MC: 4× Platinum; ARIA: 2× Platinum; BPI: 3× Platinum; RIAA: Diamond; RMNZ: 3× Platinum
Nothing Was the Same	Released: September 24, 2013; Label: OVO, Young Money, Cash Money, Republic; Formats: CD, LP, digital download, streaming	1	2	1	11	4	4	13	10	2	1	CAN: 201,000; UK: 256,013; US: 1,783,000	MC: 3× Platinum; ARIA: Platinum; IFPI DEN: Platinum; GLF: Gold; BPI: 2× Platinum; RIAA: 7× Platinum; RMNZ: 2× Platinum
Views	Released: April 29, 2016; Label: Young Money, Cash Money, Republic; Formats: CD, LP, digital download, streaming	1	1	1	4	2	1	1	2	1	1	UK: 387,000; US: 1,739,000 (Note: In 2016, the album sold 1,607,000 pure copies In 2017, it sold 114,000 copies and 18,000 copies in 2018)	MC: 6× Platinum; ARIA: 2× Platinum; IFPI DEN: 5× Platinum; GLF: 2× Platinum; BPI: 3× Platinum; RIAA: Diamond; RMNZ: 5× Platinum; SNEP: 2× Platinum
Scorpion	Released: June 29, 2018; Label: Young Money, Cash Money, Republic; Formats: CD, LP, digital download, streaming	1	1	1	3	1	1	1	1	1	1	US: 407,600 (Note: In 2018 the album sold 330,000 pure copies, 51,000 in 2019, and 22,600 more in 2020)	MC: 2× Platinum; ARIA: 2× Platinum; IFPI DEN: 3× Platinum; GLF: Platinum; BPI: 2× Platinum; RIAA: 9× Platinum; RMNZ: 5× Platinum; SNEP: Platinum
Certified Lover Boy	Released: September 3, 2021; Label: OVO, Republic; Formats: Digital download, streaming	1	1	1	3	1	1	1	1	1	1	CAN: 4,000 (Note: Canadian sales for Certified Lover Boy in 2021); US: 70,865 (Note: In 2021 the album sold 67,000 pure copies, 3,000 in 2022, and 865 in 2024)	ARIA: Platinum; IFPI DEN: Platinum; BPI: Platinum; RIAA: 5× Platinum; RMNZ: 2× Platinum; SNEP: Gold
Honestly, Nevermind	Released: June 17, 2022; Label: OVO, Republic; Formats: CD, LP, digital download, streaming	1	2	2	6	2	2	2	2	2	1	US: 16,000 (Note: In 2022 the album sold 16,000 pure copies)	MC: 2× Platinum; IFPI DEN: Gold; BPI: Gold; RIAA: Platinum; RMNZ: Platinum
For All the Dogs	Released: October 6, 2023; Label: OVO, Republic; Formats: Digital download, streaming	1	1	1	2	1	1	1	2	1	1	US: 15,484 (Note: In 2023 the album sold 13,981 pure copies, and 1,503 copies in 2024)	MC: 2× Platinum; IFPI DEN: Gold; BPI: Gold; RIAA: 3× Platinum; RMNZ: Platinum
Iceman (Note: Iceman, Maid of Honour and Habibti are sequentially ordered by their preceding singles, despite their simultaneous release; Iceman and Maid of Honour saw their preceding singles released on July 5 and July 25, 2025, respectively, whereas Habibti was not preceded by a single.)	Released: May 15, 2026; Label: OVO, Republic; Formats: Digital download, streaming	1	1	2	3	1	1	2	1	1	1	FRA: 15,000 (Note: France sales figures for Iceman as of June 2026.)	BPI: Gold; RIAA: Platinum
Maid of Honour	Released: May 15, 2026; Label: OVO, Republic; Formats: Digital download, streaming	2	6	10	31	11	6	18	10	6	3		
Habibti	Released: May 15, 2026; Label: OVO, Republic; Formats: Digital download, streaming	1	5	14	29	16	5	23	8	7	2		
"—" denotes a recording that did not chart or was not released in that territory.

=== Collaborative albums ===
List of collaborative albums, with selected chart positions
Title	Album details	Peak chart positions										Sales	Certifications
Title	Album details	CAN	AUS	DEN	FRA	IRE	NZ	NOR	SWE	UK	US	Sales	Certifications
Her Loss (with 21 Savage)	Released: November 4, 2022; Label: OVO, Republic; Format: CD, digital download, streaming	1	2	1	10	2	2	1	2	1	1	US: 20,000 (Note: In 2023 the album sold 20,000 pure copies)	MC: 2× Platinum; ARIA: Gold; IFPI DEN: Gold; BPI: Gold; RIAA: 2× Platinum; RMNZ: Platinum
Some Sexy Songs 4 U (with PartyNextDoor)	Released: February 14, 2025; Label: OVO, Republic, Santa Anna; Format: CD, LP, cassette, digital download, streaming	1	2	2	14	2	2	2	6	3	1	US: 66,237 (Note: In 2025, the album sold 66,237 pure copies.)	BPI: Gold; RIAA: Platinum

== Compilation albums ==
List of compilation albums, with selected chart positions and certifications
Title	Album details	Peak chart positions										Sales	Certifications
Title	Album details	CAN	AUS	DEN	FRA	IRE	NZ	NOR	SWE	UK	US	Sales	Certifications
Care Package	Released: August 2, 2019; Label: OVO; Formats: Digital download, streaming	1	7	11	54	7	13	11	53	4	1	US: 16,000	MC: Platinum; BPI: Gold; RIAA: Platinum; RMNZ: Gold

== Mixtapes ==
List of mixtapes, with selected chart positions
Title	Album details	Peak chart positions										Sales	Certifications
Title	Album details	CAN	AUS	DEN	FRA	IRE	NZ	NOR	SWE	UK	US	Sales	Certifications
Room for Improvement	Released: February 14, 2006 (US); Label: All Things Fresh; Formats: CD, digital download	—	—	—	—	—	—	—	—	—	—		
Comeback Season	Released: September 1, 2007 (US); Label: OVO; Formats: CD, digital download	—	—	—	—	—	—	—	—	—	—		
So Far Gone	Released: February 13, 2009; Label: OVO; Formats: CD, digital download, streaming	7	34	—	—	57	—	—	—	21	5	US: 7,000	BPI: Silver; RIAA: 3× Platinum
If You're Reading This It's Too Late	Released: February 13, 2015; Label: Young Money, Cash Money, Republic; Formats: CD, LP, digital download, streaming	1	2	6	55	13	3	14	16	3	1	CAN: 109,000; UK: 100,000; US: 1,233,000	MC: 2× Platinum; ARIA: Platinum; IFPI DEN: Platinum; BPI: Platinum; RIAA: 5× Platinum; RMNZ: Platinum
What a Time to Be Alive (with Future)	Released: September 20, 2015; Label: Young Money, Cash Money, Republic, A1, Freebandz, Epic; Format: LP, digital download, streaming	1	4	21	34	30	8	26	36	6	1	US: 2,000,000	MC: Platinum; IFPI DEN: Platinum; BPI: Gold; RIAA: 2× Platinum; RMNZ: Gold
More Life	Released: March 18, 2017; Label: Young Money, Cash Money, Republic; Format: Digital download, streaming	1	2	2	5	2	3	2	3	2	1	US: 376,000 (Note: In 2017 it sold 363,000 pure copies plus 13,000 pure copies in 2018)	MC: 2× Platinum; ARIA: Platinum; IFPI DEN: Platinum; BPI: 2× Platinum; RIAA: 6× Platinum; RMNZ: 5× Platinum; SNEP: Platinum
Dark Lane Demo Tapes	Released: May 1, 2020; Label: OVO, Republic; Format: Digital download, streaming	1	1	3	2	1	1	2	2	1	2	US: 44,400 (Note: In 2020 the album sold 44,400 pure copies)	MC: 2× Platinum; ARIA: Gold; IFPI DEN: Platinum; BPI: Gold; RMNZ: Platinum; SNEP: Gold
"—" denotes a recording that did not chart or was not released in that territory.

== Extended plays ==
List of EPs, with release date, label, selected chart positions, and certifications shown
Title	EP details	Peak chart positions				Sales	Certifications
Title	EP details	CAN	US	US R&B /HH	US Rap	Sales	Certifications
So Far Gone	Released: September 15, 2009; Label: Young Money, Cash Money, Universal Motown; Formats: CD, digital download, streaming	15	6	3	2	CAN: 58,000; US: 785,000	MC: Gold; RIAA: Gold; RMNZ: Gold
Scary Hours	Released: January 19, 2018; Label: Young Money, Cash Money, Republic; Formats: Digital download, streaming	—	—	—	—		
The Best in the World Pack	Released: June 15, 2019; Label: OVO, Frozen Moments, Republic; Formats: Digital download, streaming	—	—	—	—		
Scary Hours 2	Released: March 5, 2021; Label: OVO, Republic; Formats: Digital download, streaming	—	—	—	—		
100 Gigs	Released: August 10, 2024; Label: OVO, Republic; Formats: Digital download, streaming	—	—	—	—		
"—" denotes a recording that did not chart or was not released in that territory.

== See also ==
- Drake singles discography
- Drake videography
