= Parade on Cleveland =

2023 song by Young Thug featuring Drake

Song by Young Thug featuring Drake

from the album Business Is Business
- Released: June 23, 2023
- Genre: Pop rap; trap
- Length: 3:48
- Label: 300; Atlantic
- Songwriters: Jeffery Williams; Aubrey Graham; Leland Wayne; David Ruoff; Elias Klughammer; Kaushik Barua; Sinan Dogan
- Producers: Metro Boomin; David x Eli; Kid Masterpiece; Zinobeatz

"Parade on Cleveland" is a song by American rapper Young Thug, released on June 23, 2023, from his third studio album Business Is Business (2023). It features Canadian rapper Drake and was produced by Metro Boomin, David x Eli, Kid Masterpiece and Zinobeatz.

== Composition ==
The song begins with Drake singing over an R&B-influenced beat. It also contains a recording of a phone call between the artists coming in from the Cobb County Adult Detention Facility (where Young Thug is detained), in which Thug subtly disses YSL labelmate and rapper Gunna, before performing his verse.

== Critical reception ==
Writing for Variety, Yousef Srour gave the song a negative review: "'Parade on Cleveland' sounds out of place, opening the album with what should have been a throwaway R&B verse from Drake's 'AM/PM' series, followed by phone ringing — but it's not one of Drake's exes, rather the same automated voice that began Drakeo the Ruler & JoogSzn's jail tape, Thank You For Using GTL. Just as Drakeo began his album with laughs and jokes, Young Thug does the same. But humor quickly turns to cringe, as Thug's verse is mixed poorly and ends up mimicking Drake to a tee." Paul A. Thompson of Pitchfork criticized the song as one of the "nakedly commercial plays" from Business Is Business and commented it "could have been excised".

== Credits and personnel ==
- Young Thug – vocals, songwriting
- Drake – vocals, songwriting
- Metro Boomin – production, songwriting
- David x Eli – production, songwriting
- Zinobeatz – production, songwriting
- Kid Masterpiece – production, songwriting
- Aresh Banaji – recording
- Bainz – mastering, mixing, recording

== Charts ==
Chart performance for "Parade on Cleveland"
Chart (2023)	Peak position
Canada Hot 100 (Billboard)	44
Global 200 (Billboard)	76
New Zealand Hot Singles (RMNZ)	8
UK Singles (Official Charts)	97
US Billboard Hot 100	39
US Hot R&B/Hip-Hop Songs (Billboard)	11
