= I Do It (2 Chainz song) =

Song by 2 Chainz featuring Drake and Lil Wayne

from the album B.O.A.T.S. II: Me Time
- Released: September 10, 2013
- Recorded: 2013
- Genre: Hip hop
- Length: 4:31
- Label: Def Jam
- Songwriters: Tauheed Epps; Aubrey Graham; Dwayne Carter; Dwayne Richardson; Thomas Pentz; Gabriel Arillo
- Producers: D. Rich; Diplo (co.); Wonder Arillo (co.)

"I Do It" is a song by American rapper 2 Chainz from his second studio album B.O.A.T.S. II: Me Time (2013). "I Do It" features fellow rappers Drake and Lil Wayne, with production from D. Rich, Diplo and Wonder Arillo. The song was featured on a 2 Chainz, Beats by Dr. Dre commercial. The song debuted at number 94 on the US Billboard Hot 100 upon the album's release.

== Background ==
On August 25, 2013, "I Do It" was featured in a Beats by Dr. Dre commercial, for their "Destroy Bad Sound" campaign. The commercial features 2 Chainz, destroying a generic pair of earbud headphones with a sledgehammer. On September 5, 2013, the full audio for "I Do It" was premiered. The song featured two verses from both 2 Chainz and Lil Wayne, with an additional verse from Drake. The six-minute song features Lil Wayne and Drake trading bars back and forth, and closes with a soulful gospel choir. Prior to its release, the song was hailed as one of the most anticipated collaborations on B.O.A.T.S. II: Me Time. It serves as the sequel to his hit collaboration with Drake, "No Lie".

== Critical reception ==
"I Do It" was met with generally positive reviews from music critics, with most praising the production, and referring to the song as a highlight of the album. Jordan Sargent of Spin said the production of the song "rips wholesale the punishing sound of Shawty Redd", who was originally thought to have produced the song. He also said the song "has to be an impending single and it's one of the year's best beats." Jake Jenkins of AbsolutePunk praised the "bombastic trap" production of the song. Kyle Kramer of Pitchfork Media praised the song as a highlight of the album, along with praising the three rappers respective verses. Dan Rys of XXL praised the three artists for "creating a bit of a back-and-forth hand-off," which was described as "brilliant in its subtlety." Peter Marrack of Exclaim! called the song a potential future single, and was one of the few songs he praised in his negative review of the album.

== Chart performance ==
Chart (2013)	Peak position
US Billboard Hot 100	94
US Hot R&B/Hip-Hop Songs (Billboard)	31
