= Roshana =

- Birth name: Roshana Taquise Palmer
- Born: March 8, 1989 (age 36)
- Origin: Toronto, Ontario, Canada
- Genres: R&B, CCM
- Occupation(s): Singer, songwriter
- Years active: 2005–present
- Website: Roshana

Roshana Taquise Palmer (born March 8, 1989) is a Canadian Positive/Inspirational R&B singer-songwriter managed by S4 Entertainment.

== Biography ==
Roshana began in her shy pre-teen years, as part of a local youth choir. Headlining at many local events, Roshana has successfully started her musical career. When speaking to her ultimate motivation, she writes. "So many days I sat and prayed to see this dream come true, it's coming to pass and it's coming so fast and it's all because I listened to You.”

Influenced and inspired by the works of Lauryn Hill, Fred Hammond, Boyz II Men, Tamia, Beyoncé, and Alicia Keys; it is Roshana's heartfelt riffs and soul searching approach that makes her style unmistakably her own. With her distinguished trademark sound, Roshana is diligently recording songs for her second album. After the tremendous success of her debut, award-winning solo album, (produced mostly by Chozen Williams and also included the hit single "Steady", produced by Dan "DFS" Johnson, the demand for this hot new young talent to bring forth new material is quickly rising. Roshana continues to flourish to new heights as she continues to set her life to music.

Roshana was the noted Opening Act for Brian Littrell of the Backstreet Boys, Cross Movement and Israel Houghton while on their Toronto tour dates.

Roshana is currently working on her new album which is said to feature Canadian Idol Finalist Gary Beals.

== Discography ==
Information	Singles
Roshana: Released: July 12, 2005	Main single: "Steady" ft. Promise; Peak position: #10 (CND CCM CHR)

== Awards and nominations ==
GMA Canada Covenant Awards

- 2005 nominee, Best Contemporary Gospel/Urban Album of the Year: Roshana
- 2005 nominee, Best Urban Song Of The Year: "Steady"

Maja Awards

- 2006 nominee, Best Young Performer
- 2006 nominee, Best New Artist
- 2006 Best Urban Gospel Performer

Shai Awards

- 2007 nominee, Best Urban Gospel Album: Roshana
