= List of Drake samples and sampling disputes =

Noah "40" Shebib (left) and Drake (right) in the studio in 2016.

Throughout his career, Canadian rapper Drake has incorporated samples and interpolations of other artists' music into his songs, from the mixtape Comeback Season (2007) to the 2026 albums Iceman, Maid of Honour and Habibti. In 2015, Complex wrote that Drake is "by no means known as a sample-based rapper", but credited his producers Noah "40" Shebib and Boi-1da with finding obscure sample loops and reworking popular songs into new instrumentals.

However, Drake has also been involved in disputes over the authorization of his samples, some of them legal. In 2010, Playboy Enterprises sued Drake, Cash Money Records and Universal Music Group, alleging that "Best I Ever Had" sampled "Fallin' in Love" by Hamilton, Joe Frank & Reynolds. A musician who performs as Sam Skully later sued over "In My Feelings" and "Nice for What", filing the claim repeatedly, most recently in 2022, and in 2023 Ghanaian artist Obrafour sued over "Calling My Name". Other artists have publicly objected to Drake's use of their work, including the Pet Shop Boys over "All the Parties" and Burna Boy over "Get It Together".

== Comeback Season ==
Track	Sample	Ref.
"Comeback Season"	"Failure" by Lupe Fiasco	
"Closer"	"Closer" by Goapele	
"Barry Bonds (Freestyle)"	"Barry Bonds" by Kanye West	
"Going in for Life"	"Intimate Friends" by Eddie Kendricks	
"Where to Now"	"Time: The Donut of the Heart" by J Dilla	
"Think Good Thoughts"	"Sweet Love" by Anita Baker	
"Teach U a Lesson (Freestyle)"	"Teach U a Lesson" by Robin Thicke	
"Missin' You (Freestyle)"	"Missin' You" by Trey Songz	
"Man of the Year (Freestyle)"	"Man of the Year" by Flo Rida, Brisco and Lil Wayne	

== So Far Gone ==
Track	Sample(s)	Ref.
"Lust for Life"	"Ideas as Opiates" by Tears for Fears	
"Let's Call It Off"	"Let's Call It Off" by Peter Bjorn and John	
"November 18th"	"Da Streets Ain't Right" by Kris Kross, remixed by Robert Davis (Note: "Da Streets Ain't Right" contains a portion of "Warning" by the Notorious B.I.G. (Note: "Warning" contains a sample of "Walk On By" by Isaac Hayes)) (Note: "Da Streets Ain't Right" also embodies a portion of "Talking in Your Sleep" by the Romantics)	
"November 18th"	"Pimp tha Pen" by Lil' Keke (Note: "Pimp tha Pen" contains a sample of "Pocket Full of Stones" by UGK)	
"November 18th"	"June 27th" by DJ Screw featuring Big Moe and Big Pokey (Note: "June 27th" contains a sample of "Da Streets Ain't Right" by Kris Kross (Note: "Da Streets Ain't Right" is a remix of "Talking in Your Sleep by the Romantics"))	
"Ignant Shit"	"Ignorant Shit" by Jay-Z and Beanie Sigel (Note: "Ignorant Shit" contains a sample of "Between the Sheets" by the Isley Brothers)	
"A Night Off"	"Ignorant Shit" by Jay-Z and Beanie Sigel	
"Say What's Real"	"Say You Will" by Kanye West	
"Little Bit"	"Little Bit" by Lykke Li	
"Best I Ever Had" (Note: "Best I Ever Had" is also a track on So Far Gone (EP))	"Fallin' in Love" by Hamilton, Joe Frank & Reynolds	
"Best I Ever Had"	"Do It for the Boy" by Lil Wayne	
"Unstoppable"	"Unstoppable" by Santigold	
"Uptown" (Note: "Uptown" is also a track on So Far Gone (EP))	"Uptown Girl" by Billy Joel	
"Bria's Interlude"	"Friendly Skies" by Missy Elliott (Note: "Friendly Skies" contains a sample of "New World Symphony" by Earth, Wind & Fire)	
"Outro"	"The Tourist" by Chilly Gonzales	
Bonus track
"Congratulations"	"Viva la Vida" by Coldplay	

=== "Best I Ever Had" ===
==== "Fallin' in Love sample ====
In June 2010, Hot 97 DJ DJ Absolut filed a breach-of-contract lawsuit in a Queens court against producer and rapper Kia Shine (Nakia Coleman) over "Best I Ever Had". Shine had earlier claimed to own 25 per cent of the song's publishing rights, which Drake denied, stating, "I have never met Kia Shine or worked with him." Drake said he wrote the composition in Toronto and borrowed one line from a Lil Wayne song whose beat Shine had produced.

According to Absolut's lawyers, Shine had agreed to pay Absolut 20 per cent of the song's proceeds because it contained a beat Shine made before its release. The suit alleged that Shine broke that agreement and instead met with Drake's representatives to receive 25 per cent of the song's copyright interest, reportedly earning him $1 million. Absolut's lawyer told the New York Daily News that they had been unable to reach Shine. The song traces back to "Do It for Ya Boy", produced by Shine and Lil Wayne, which appeared on Absolut's mixtape The Leak.

==== "Unstoppable" sample ====
Santigold's song "Unstoppable" was sampled on a collaboration with Lil Wayne on So Far Gone. In June 2009, Brooklyn DJ Terry Urban said that Downtown Music, Santigold's label, had sent him a cease-and-desist letter over Southerngold, a mixtape he had made by blending Southern rap vocals over remixed samples of tracks that influenced Santigold, as he was uploading it for free download. Santigold responded with a statement that she had never heard of the DJ or the mix before it was brought to her on Myspace, that she had not sent any cease-and-desist letter, and that she supported mixtape culture. Downtown Music declined to comment to Pitchfork. Urban ignored the letter and posted the mixtape online, arguing that it was free promotion for Santigold.

==== "Do It for the Boy" sample ====
In June 2010, Playboy Enterprises filed a copyright-infringement lawsuit against Drake, Cash Money Records and Universal Music Group in the U.S. District Court in Los Angeles. The suit alleged that Drake's song "Best I Ever Had" sampled "Fallin' in Love" (1975) by Hamilton, Joe Frank & Reynolds. Playboy stated that the copyright in the song belonged to Playboy Music, Inc., of which it was the successor in interest. "Fallin' in Love" had reached number one in the United States in 1975 and was Playboy Records' only pop hit.

Playboy alleged that each defendant "knew or should have reasonably known" that the sound recording was protected by copyright, and that the infringement was ongoing. It sought an injunction, an accounting of profits, and costs and attorneys' fees. It also sought damages and demanded that "all infringing works be recalled and destroyed". Toronto Life suggested that the overlap was the introduction of the songs, while The Guardian described it as the shared opening bass riff.

== Thank Me Later ==
Track	Sample(s)	Ref.
"Fancy"	"I Don't Want to Play Around" by Ace Spectrum	
"Unforgettable"	"At Your Best" by Aaliyah	
"Miss Me"	"Wild Flower" by Hank Crawford	
"Miss Me"	Interpolation of "What's Hannenin'" by Soulja Boy	

== Take Care ==
Track	Sample(s)	Ref.
"Over My Dead Body"	Elements of "Sailin' Da South" by DJ Screw	
"Shot for Me"	"Anything" by SWV	
"Take Care"	"I'll Take Care of You" by Gil Scott-Heron	
"Under Ground Kings"	"Neck of the Woods" by Birdman featuring Lil Wayne	
"Under Ground Kings"	Elements of "Duffle Bag Boy" by Playaz Circle featuring Lil Wayne	
"Cameras"	"Calling on You" by Jon B.	
"Doing It Wrong"	"The Wrong Thing to Do" by Don McLean	
"Look What You've Done"	Elements of "If U Scared, Say U Scared" by Playa	
"HYFR (Hell Ya Fucking Right)"	"Swanging and Banging" by E.S.G.	
"Practice"	"Back That Azz Up" by Juvenile featuring Lil Wayne and Mannie Fresh	
Digital bonus tracks
"The Motto"	Elements of "She Will" by Lil Wayne featuring Drake	
"The Motto"	"Baby Got Back" by Sir Mix-a-Lot	

== Nothing Was the Same ==
Track	Sample(s)	Ref.
"Tuscan Leather"	Interpolation of "Serious" by Steady B	
"Tuscan Leather"	"I Have Nothing" by Whitney Houston	
"Tuscan Leather"	"When Seasons Change" (live) by Curtis Mayfield	
"Started from the Bottom"	Ambessence Piano & Drones by Bruno Sanfilippo	
"Wu-Tang Forever"	"It's Yourz" by Wu-Tang Clan	
"Wu-Tang Forever"	"Loss Config" by Zodiac Beats	
"Own It"	Interpolation of "Wu-Tang Forever" by Drake (Note: "Wu-Tang Forever" samples "It's Yourz" by Wu-Tang Clan) (Note: "Wu-Tang Forever" also samples "Loss Config" by Zodiac Beats)	
"Too Much"	"Too Much" by Sampha	
"Pound Cake / Paris Morton Music 2"	Interpolation of "C.R.E.A.M." by Wu-Tang Clan	
"Pound Cake / Paris Morton Music 2"	"Don't Say a Word" by Ellie Goulding	
"Pound Cake / Paris Morton Music 2"	"Jimmy Smith Rap" by Jimmy Smith	

== If You're Reading This It's Too Late ==
Track	Sample(s)	Ref.
"Legend"	"So Anxious" by Ginuwine	
"Energy"	"The Stopper" by Cutty Ranks	
"Energy"	"Eazy-Duz-It" by Eazy-E	
"Energy"	"Ridin' Spinners" by Three 6 Mafia	
"Know Yourself"	"Tinted Glass" by Network	
"No Tellin'"	"No Talk" by River Tiber	
"Madonna"	"So Anxious" by Ginuwine	
"6 God"	"Haunted Chase" by David Wise	
"Star67"	"Nimm Meine Hand" by Novalis	
"Preach"	"Body Party" by Ciara	
"Preach"	"Stay" by Henry Krinkle	
"Wednesday Night Interlude"	"Unfaith" by Ekali	
"6 Man"	"You Got Me" by The Roots	
"Jungle"	"6 8" by Gabriel Garzón-Montano	
Bonus tracks
"How About Now"	"My Heart Belongs to U" by Jodeci	

== Views ==
Track	Sample(s)	Ref.
"9"	"Dying" by Mavado featuring Serani	
"U with Me?"	"What These Bitches Want" by DMX featuring Sisqó	
"U with Me?"	Interpolation of "How's It Goin' Down" by DMX	
"Feel No Ways"	"World's Famous" by Malcolm McLaren	
"Weston Road Flows"	"Mary's Joint" by Mary J. Blige	
"Redemption"	"One Wish" by Ray J	
"Faithful"	"Get Gone" by Ideal	
"Faithful"	"Tom Ford (Remix)" by Jay-Z featuring Pimp C	
"Controlla"	"Tear Off Mi Garment" by Beenie Man	
"One Dance"	"Do You Mind (Crazy Cousins Remix)" by Paleface featuring Kyla	
"Childs Play"	"Like a Soldier" by Ha-Sizzle	
"Too Good"	"Love Yuh Bad" by Popcaan	
"Fire & Desire"	"I Dedicate (Part II)" by Brandy	
"Views"	"The Question Is" by The Winans	
"Hotline Bling"	"Why Can't We Live Together" by Timmy Thomas	

== More Life ==
Track	Sample(s)	Ref.
"Free Smoke"	"Roll Up" by Tony Yayo featuring Danny Brown	
"Free Smoke"	"Building a Ladder" by Hiatus Kaiyote	
"Passionfruit"	"Live @ Cutloose 2nd Birthday Party" by Moodymann	
"Jorja Interlude"	Interpolation of "Doing It Wrong" by Drake	
"Get It Together"	"Superman" by Black Coffee featuring Bucie	
"Get It Together"	"More Life" by Burna Boy	
"Blem"	Interpolation of "All Night Long" by Lionel Richie	
"Teenage Fever"	Elements of "If You Had My Love" by Jennifer Lopez	
"KMT"	"His World" by Tomoya Ohtani	
"KMT"	"Shutdown" by Skepta	
"Glow"	"Devotion – Live" by Earth, Wind & Fire	
"Glow"	"6 8" by Gabriel Garzón-Montano	
"Glow"	"Jungle" by Drake (Note: "Jungle" contains a sample of "6 8" by Gabriel Garzón-Montano)	
"Since Way Back"	"Clipped Wings" by R. Kelly	
"Do Not Disturb"	"Time" by Snoh Aalegra	

== Scorpion ==
Track	Sample(s)	Ref.
A Side
"Survival"	"Telex" by Claude Larson	
"Nonstop"	"My Head Is Spinning" by DJ Squeeky and Mack Daddy Ju	
"Emotionless"	"Emotions (12" Club Mix)" by Mariah Carey	
"8 Out of 10"	"You're Gettin' a Little Too Smart" by the Detroit Emeralds	
"8 Out of 10"	"All the Way Round" by Marvin Gaye	
"Mob Ties"	Interpolation of "Affirmative Action" by Nas	
"Talk Up"	"Dopeman" by N.W.A	
"Is There More"	Interpolation of "More Than a Woman" by Aaliyah	
B Side
"Nice for What"	"Ex-Factor" by Lauryn Hill	
"Nice for What"	"Drag Rap (Triggerman)" by the Show Boys	
"Ratchet Happy Birthday"	"Just Memories" by Eddie Kendricks	
"That's How You Feel"	"Boss Ass Bitch" (live) by Nicki Minaj	
"In My Feelings"	"Lollipop" by Lil Wayne	
"In My Feelings"	"Smoking Gun" by Magnolia Shorty	
"In My Feelings"	"Drag Rap (Triggerman)" by the Show Boys	
"In My Feelings"	Uncredited portion of the episode "Champagne Papi"	
"After Dark"	"The Suite Theme" by Maxwell	
"Final Fantasy"	"The Windmills of Your Mind" by Dorothy Ashby	
"March 14"	"Lady" by D'Angelo	
"March 14"	Interpolation of "Khalil" by Boyz II Men	

=== "Nice for What" and "In My Feelings" ===
In 2019, a year after the release of Scorpion, a musician named Samuel Nicholas III, who performs as Sam Skully, filed a copyright-infringement lawsuit against Drake over "In My Feelings" and "Nice for What". Nicholas alleged that elements of his 2000 track "Roll Call (Instrumental)" had been sampled in both songs, which were produced by BlaqNmilD (Adam J. Pigott). Both songs spent more than eight weeks at number one on the Billboard Hot 100. Nicholas had twice filed the same claims before, and both earlier cases were dismissed because he did not pursue them in court.

In March 2022, Nicholas filed a third lawsuit in a Louisiana federal court. It claimed that the New Orleans bounce sound of the two songs came from "directly copying" his track. The complaint alleged that BlaqNmilD had added the same sample to other bounce records he produced for other artists. As evidence, it cited a video interview the producer gave to Genius, in which an audio clip of about 18 seconds of a beat was shown. The lawsuit also named Big Freedia and several other entities, among them Asylum Records, Cash Money Records and Republic Records.

BlaqNmilD's representatives said that the producer and Nicholas had each sampled "Drag Rap (Triggerman)", a 1986 song by the Showboys, rather than one copying the other. His manager, Craig E. Baylis, said that Pigott had made sure the group was contacted for clearances, and asked whether Nicholas had done the same. Representatives for Drake and Warner Music Group, the parent company of the songs' publishers, did not respond to Billboard's requests for comment.

== Care Package ==
Track	Sample(s)	Ref.
"Dreams Money Can Buy"	"BTSTU (Demo)" by Jai Paul	
"How Bout Now"	"My Heart Belongs to U" by Jodeci	
"Trust Issues"	Interpolation of "I'm on One" by DJ Khaled	
"Days in the East"	"Stay" by Rihanna	
"Draft Day"	"Doo Wop (That Thing)" by Lauryn Hill	
"4PM in Calabasas"	"You're a Customer" by EPMD	
"4PM in Calabasas"	Interpolation of "Can't Nobody Hold Me Down" by Puff Daddy	
"Jodeci Freestyle"	"4 U" by Jodeci	
"Free Spirit"	"I Will Be Your Friend" by Sade	
"Heat of the Moment"	"Phone Sex (That's What's Up)" by Avant	
"Girls Love Beyoncé"	"Say My Name" by Destiny's Child	
"Paris Morton Music"	"Aston Martin Music" by Rick Ross	

== Dark Lane Demo Tapes ==
Track	Sample	Ref.
"When to Say When"	"Sounds Like a Love Song" by Bobby Glenn	
"Chicago Freestyle"	Interpolation of "Superman" by Eminem	
"From Florida with Love"	Interpolation of "Lollipop" by Lil Wayne	

== Certified Lover Boy ==
Track	Sample(s)	Ref.
"Champagne Poetry"	"Navajo" by Masego (Note: "Navajo" contains a sample of "Michelle" by The Singers Unlimited)	
"Champagne Poetry"	"Until I Found the Lord (My Soul Couldn't Rest)" by the Gabriel Hardeman Delegation	
"Papi's Home"	"Daddy's Home" by Montell Jordan	
"Girls Want Girls"	Interpolation of "Time Flies" by Drake	
"Love All"	"Life After Death Intro" by The Notorious B.I.G.	
"Fair Trade"	"Mountains" by Charlotte Day Wilson	
"Way 2 Sexy"	Elements of "I'm Too Sexy" by Right Said Fred	
"TSU"	"Half on a Baby" by R. Kelly	
"TSU"	"Sailing" by NSYNC	
"TSU"	"Until the End of Time" by Justin Timberlake	
"N 2 Deep"	"Get Throwed" by Bun B	
"No Friends in the Industry"	"I Call Your Name" by Switch	
"No Friends in the Industry"	"Niggaz Ain't Barin Dat" by Three 6 Mafia	
"Knife Talk"	"Feed the Streets" by Juicy J	
"Race My Mind"	"Dead Wrong" by The Notorious B.I.G.	
"Race My Mind"	Interrelation of "Rumpelstiltskin" by Sun Ra	
"Race My Mind"	Interpolation of "Give It to Me Baby" by Rick James	
"You Only Live Twice"	"Can't Get You Off of My Mind" by the Brothers of Soul	

== Honestly, Nevermind ==
Track	Sample(s)	Ref.
"Currents"	"Some Cut" by Trillville	
"Currents"	"Shake It to the Ground" by Blaqstarr and Rye Rye	
"Calling My Name"	"Oye Ohene" by Obrafour	
"Sticky"	"Everything in Quotes" lecture by Virgil Abloh	
"Flight's Booked"	"Getting Late" by Floetry	
"Jimmy Cooks"	"Just Awaken Shaken" by Playa Fly	
"Jimmy Cooks"	"You Were Gone" by Brook Benton	

=== "Calling My Name" ===
In April 2023, Ghanaian artist Obrafour filed a copyright-infringement lawsuit against Drake, alleging that "Calling My Name" sampled his 2003 single "Oye Ohene (Remix)" without permission. According to the suit, a member of Drake's team twice emailed Obrafour a sample clearance request in the week before Honestly, Nevermind was surprise-released on 17 June 2022, but Obrafour had not replied to either when the album came out within hours of being announced. The suit described the sample as a direct copy with little or no audible alteration, and noted that the song had been streamed more than 47 million times on Spotify and more than 4.1 million times on YouTube in the 304 days after its release. It sought at least $10 million in compensation, citing profits and damages from album sales, downloads, digital revenue, sponsorships and concerts.

Obrafour's lawyer, Imran H. Ansari, said that Obrafour owns the copyright in the song in both Ghana and the United States, and that Drake used it without permission, credit or payment. He said that Drake tried to secure the rights days before the release but put the song out without waiting for approval. Representatives for Drake did not immediately respond to Rolling Stone's request for comment.

== Her Loss ==
Track	Sample(s)	Ref.
"Rich Flex"	"Welcome to the Hive" by Charles Bernstein	
"Rich Flex"	"I Want You, Girl" by Sugar	
"Rich Flex"	Interpolation of "Savage" by Megan Thee Stallion	
"Rich Flex"	Interpolation of "24's" by T.I.	
"Privileged Rappers"	"Ballad for the Fallen Soldier" by the Isley Brothers	
"Spin Bout U"	"Give Me Your Lov-N" by Oobie	
"Treacherous Twins"	"Lonely Daze" by Ginuwine	
"Circo Loco"	Elements of "One More Time" by Daft Punk	
"Middle of the Ocean"	"Cry Together" by the O'Jays	

== For All the Dogs ==
Track	Sample(s)	Ref.
"Virginia Beach"	"Wiseman" by Frank Ocean	
"Calling for You"	"Shake It to the Ground" by Blaqstarr and Rye Rye	
"Daylight"	Al Pacino from Scarface (1983)	
"First Person Shooter"	"Look Me in the Eyes" by Joe Washington and Wash	
"First Person Shooter"	"Redemption" by Snorre Tidemand	
"IDGAF"	"The Tunnel" by Azimuth	
"7969 Santa"	"I Don't Like" by Chief Keef and Lil Reese	
"Screw the World"	"If I Ruled the World (Imagine That)" by DJ Screw (Note: "If I Ruled the World" contains a sample of "If I Ruled the World (Imagine That)" by Nas and Lauryn Hill)	
"All the Parties"	Uncredited interpolation of "West End Girls" by Pet Shop Boys	
"8AM in Charlotte"	"A Faithful Spirit" by Nichol Eskridge	
"Rich Baby Daddy"	Interpolation of "Dog Days Are Over" by Florence and the Machine	

=== "All the Parties" ===
In October 2023, on the day For All the Dogs was released, the Pet Shop Boys said that Drake had not approached them about interpolating their song "West End Girls" on "All the Parties". The 1986 single reached number one on the Billboard Hot 100, and on "All the Parties" Drake sings its "East End boys and West End girls" chorus. The duo said the use came as a surprise, with "no credit given or permission requested". Pitchfork described the interpolation as controversial, among the album's other notable samples such as Frank Ocean's "Wiseman" on "Virginia Beach" and Chief Keef's "I Don't Like" on "7969 Santa", and repeated the duo's claim that Drake used the song without credit or permission.

== 100 Gigs ==
Track	Sample	Ref.
"Blue Green Red"	Interpolation of "When" by Tiger	

== Some Sexy Songs 4 U ==
Track	Sample	Ref.
"CN Tower"	"Lollipop" by Lil Wayne and Static Major	
"Spider-Man Superman"	"The Real Her" by Drake, Lil Wayne and André 3000	
"Gimme a Hug"	"I Miss You" by Aaron Hall	
"Nokia"	Interpolation of the "Nokia tune"	

== Iceman ==
Track	Sample	Ref.
"Janice STFU"	Interpolation of "I Follow Rivers" by Lykke Li	
"Make Them Pay"	Elements of "Free" by Deniece Williams	
"2 Hard 4 the Radio"	Interpolation of "2 Hard 4 the Fuckin' Radio" by Mac Dre	

== Maid of Honour ==
Track	Sample(s)	Ref.
"Hoe Phase"	"Give It All You've Got" by Afro-Rican	
"Road Trips"	"Swangin' and Bangin'" by E.S.G.	
"Cheetah Print"	"(It Goes Like) Nanana" by Peggy Gou	
"Cheetah Print"	Interpolation of "Cha Cha Slide" by DJ Casper	
"Which One"	Interpolation of "Work" by Rihanna featuring Drake	
"Which One"	Interpolation of "Wannabe" by the Spice Girls	
"Amazing Shape"	Elements of "Who Am I (Sim Simma)" by Beenie Man	
"BBW"	"Work" by Denise Belfon	
"True Bestie"	"PSA" by Iconic Savvy	
"Where's Your Stuff"	TikTok video by youfoundivyy	

== Habibti ==
Track	Sample(s)	Ref.
"Slap the City"	"Show Me a Good Time" by Drake	
Habibti (FOMO) tracks
"Solar Eclipse"	Interpolation of "Choosin' Texas" by Ella Langley	
"Solar Eclipse"	"Get Throwed" by Bun B featuring Pimp C, Z-Ro, Young Jeezy and Jay-Z	

== Other ==
=== Singles ===
Track	Sample	Ref.
"0 to 100 / The Catch Up"	"Vibez" by Frank Dukes and Chester Hansen	
