= Maid of Honour (album) =

Studio album by Drake
- Released: May 15, 2026
- Genres: Dance; house; electro
- Length: 45:09
- Languages: English; Jamaican Patois
- Labels: OVO; Republic
- Producers: 40; Alex Lustig; Alvaro; Andro Andro; APMelodies; B4U; Bonboi; Brinx Parker; Butts; Digital Jet; DJ Cruz; Drake; Elkan; Gino Nano; Gordo; Govi; Hyde; Jon Milli; Josias; Kid Masterpiece; Klahr; Kouture; Liohn; Mxssivh; Nico Baran; O Lil Angel; OG Parker; Oz; Product; RiotUSA; Royall; SavBeats; Sean Turk; Shemar Pierre; SkipOnDaBeat; Smash David; Stack!e; Waller; Whiskerprince; Zecca

Drake chronology
Iceman (2026)	Maid of Honour (2026)	Habibti (2026)

Singles from Maid of Honour
- 1. "Which One" Released: July 25, 2025

Maid of Honour (stylized in all caps) is the tenth studio album by Canadian rapper Drake, released through OVO Sound and Republic Records on May 15, 2026 as a surprise album alongside Drake's ninth and eleventh studio albums (Note: Despite their simultaneous release, the albums are sequentially ordered by their preceding singles; Iceman and Maid of Honour saw their preceding singles released on July 5 and July 25, 2025, respectively, whereas Habibti was not preceded by a single.) Iceman and Habibti. The albums are a follow-up to Drake's collaborative album Some Sexy Songs 4 U (2025) and mark his first solo studio albums since For All the Dogs (2023).

Production for Maid of Honour was handled by Drake's frequent collaborators, including Gordo, O Lil Angel, and Oz, among others, and features guest appearances from Stunna Sandy, Sexyy Red, Central Cee, Popcaan, and Iconic Savvy. It was preceded by the lead single "Which One", released on July 25, 2025.

Maid of Honour is characterized by a fluid, club-oriented aesthetic, primarily drawing from dance, house and electro music; critics and journalists noted its broad soundscape as incorporating various ethnic and social cultural influences. Similar to Drake's previous releases, lyrical themes include tainted romances, financial excess, and sexual relationships, and the album also discusses drug and alcohol use.

Maid of Honour received generally positive reviews from music critics, most of whom named it the best album of the trilogy. It opened with first-week sales of 110,000 album-equivalent units in the United States and debuted at number three on the Billboard 200; with Iceman and Habibti debuting at number one and two, respectively, Drake became the first artist ever to hold the top three spots on the Billboard 200 concurrently. Internationally, Maid of Honour peaked in the top ten in several countries, including Australia, Canada, Portugal, New Zealand, and the United Kingdom.

== Background and promotion ==
Maid of Honour's lead single, "Which One", was released on July 25, 2025. A snippet of the track was first previewed during Drake's "Iceman: Episode 1" livestream on July 5, and was previewed again on July 12, during the second day of his three-day Wireless Festival performance. On July 24, three weeks after releasing the single "What Did I Miss?" for Iceman, Drake premiered "Which One" in full during the "Iceman: Episode 2" livestream.

The album was surprise released on May 15, 2026, alongside Habibti, following the "Iceman: Episode 4" livestream a day prior; the CN Tower was fully illuminated ice-blue and visual projections were used to make it appear completely frozen to promote the releases. Speaking on the surprise release of all three albums, Peter A. Berry of Bloomberg News called them "a total rejection of the critical and commercial systems that often define the music business" and said Drake's "unconventional" album release strategies has resulted in him "drift[ing] further from the traditional [music] canon". The song "Stuck" on the album features additional vocals from Qendresa, who also collaborated with Drake on "Slap the City", "Fortworth", and "Gen 5" on Habibti; Drake was introduced to her music by producer Kid Masterpiece, who previously played her music on SiriusXM's OVO Sound channel.

The cover art for Maid of Honour shows a photograph of Drake's family, with his mother Sandi Sher-Graham centered holding a bridal bouquet, with a photo of a young Drake and his father Dennis Graham imposed over. The cover art was shared via Drake's Instagram on May 14, just prior to the album's release. Speaking on the style of the album's artwork, Chris Murphy of Vanity Fair remarked that it "adds an unexpected element of camp to the [album]". On September 19, Drake released the music videos for "Hoe Phase", "Road Trips", "Outside Tweaking", "Cheetah Print", "True Bestie", "New Bestie", and "Princess", which initially featured in his short film Fear of Missing Out (2026).

Speaking on the promotion of the three albums more broadly, The Fader's Steffanee Wang praised Drake's execution as "simultaneously annoying, unpredictable, and genuinely exciting", writing Drake's ability to be an "incredible showman" and draw attention to his releases is rare and unique compared to the "extremely predictable and terribly dull" release and promotional techniques of other artists. Wang particularly highlighted his use of the ice sculpture and covering courtside Toronto Raptors seats with ice, concluding, "the music industry needed [Drake]–someone human, insane, and truly unhinged to break simulation".

== Composition and themes ==
=== Composition ===
Maid of Honour has been compared to Drake's albums More Life (2017) and Honestly, Nevermind (2022), which notably incorporated club, dancehall, and house music. Maid of Honour's primary producer, Gordo, stated that each song on the album had between 10 and 20 different versions during its recording process.

The album's opening track, "Hoe Phase", features a "moody" atmosphere that Pitchfork's Alphonse Pierre compared to Drake's So Far Gone mixtape, with its latter half incorporating Afrobeats and amapiano rhythms. Jeff Ihaza of Rolling Stone praised it as "a dazzling display of how dance music, unlike traditional hip-hop, thrives on fluidity". "Outside Tweaking" is a "bouncy" footwork track with elements of Jersey club; Stunna Sandy's guest appearance was praised by Pierre as "sound[ing] like a star". Awarded Pitchfork's "Best New Track", "Cheetah Print" is a hip house and electro song that samples Peggy Gou's "(It Goes Like) Nanana". Drake raps with robotic vocal effects; his flirts throughout the track were described by Walden Green of Pitchfork as "half-hearted [...] but in a charming way". Sexyy Red appears halfway through the song for a "real freak" verse interpolating "Cha Cha Slide" into a "thottier version of the dance". "Which One" features an "island-tinged" Afrobeat and dancehall inspired instrumental. Narratively, it depicts Drake and Central Cee addressing respective love interests, with Drake noting how she stands out from her friends and enemies and Central Cee noting her physical appearance and sexuality. The Popcaan-featuring "Amazing Shape" is a "smooth" dancehall track, with Drake primarily singing in Jamaican Patois. Ihaza considered it an "upgrade" to Drake's 2016 song "Controlla", which was originally a collaboration between the two artists. "BBW" (a shortened form of the term "big beautiful woman") features elements of Mantronix-esque electro and techno, with a beat switch to "marauding" baile funk and an "explosion" of distorted synths in the second half. Pierre compared it to music at the Berlin nightclub Berghain; although, Kiana Fitzgerald of Consequence described the track as a "knockoff" of Drake's 2018 song "Nice for What" but for plus-size women.

"True Bestie" features a Jersey club instrumental with influences of footwork and drill music, a fusion that Aron A. of HotNewHipHop commended as "feel[ing] surprisingly natural rather than trend-conscious". Chicago-based rapper Iconic Savvy is credited as a featured artist on the track due to a prominent sample of her 2025 song "PSA". Following the interlude "Where's Your Stuff", performed by TikTok creator youfoundivyy, "New Bestie" is a "classic Drake breakup anthem", with his "patois-inflected" vocal delivery in the song's Jersey club-inspired second half being called a homage to dancehall artist Vybz Kartel and "a callback to [Drake's] More Life era" by The Fader's Hajin Yoo. "Q&A" blends baile funk and sexy drill; Canadian producer APMelodies, who helped work on the track, said that Drake intended the instrumental to channel "summer ratchet vibes" and privately called it "a smash hit". A new jack swing song with elements of bounce music, Pierre and Jenkins compared "Stuck" to 1990s R&B acts Mint Condition and Keith Sweat, respectively, while Roisin O'Connor of The Independent considered it derived inspiration from (and served as a "blatant" musical tribute to) Michael Jackson. "Goose and the Juice" combines "gated reverb and AutoTuned pillow talk", according to Jenkins; Mikael Wood of the Los Angeles Times compared it to the work of rock band MGMT. Ludovic Hunter-Tilney of the Financial Times argued that the album's closing track, "Princess", which features emo-inspired singing and instrumentation, is Drake "trolling humourless rap purists. The last laugh [after the Lamar feud] is his". Pierre compared his performance on the song to "a 16 year old with an XXXTentacion poster on his wall", while Robert Moran of The Sydney Morning Herald noted the track's similarities to the Pixies' song "Where Is My Mind?", describing it as "oddly endearing". Ihaza hailed it as Drake's "most divisive left turn yet".

=== Themes ===
Ihaza argued Maid of Honour's varied sound, which includes electro, dance and house alongside dancehall, Afrobeat, hip-hop, UK rap, and grunge, explores increasing cultural literacy and rising multiculturalism in Western societies, writing: "The album's underlying argument is not that identity no longer matters, but that culture itself has become too unstable, interconnected, and diasporic to survive [any] authenticity politics". He also wrote that by Drake being "strangely honest" about rising multiculturalism on Maid of Honour, it recasts Lamar's critiques of Drake as "inauthentic" during their feud to actually demonstrate "[Drake's] prudent understanding of [culturally changing] times". This was echoed by Moran, who said that Maid of Honour "is determinedly global" and hinted its diverse content as denoting cultural pluralism, writing that "Maid of Honour might be the ultimate expression of Drake as cross-cultural agitator". Tom Breihan of Stereogum likened the use of interjections across the album to drag-ball culture, writing it "suggests a level of comfort with queerness that [an artist like] Drake has never approached before". Speaking of the albums broadly, Jenkins also commented on their multicultural influences, saying each of them "dabble in Arabic phrases" and "nod to [Drake's] Muslim associates", concluding the albums "[acknowledge] Toronto as home to countless faiths and races, to Black and Arab experiences" and ensure "appeal to all the proverbial political aisles". Murphy also noted the album's blend of multicultural experiences, highlighting "Cheetah Print"'s use of "Cha Cha Slide" (which is commonly played at bar mitzvahs) being interpolated "as an instruction" on how to perform the West and Central African-derived twerking dance.

Other commentators discussed its lyrics, detailing how opener "Hoe Phase" highlights promiscuous women but also reflects Drake's own refusal to engage in monogamy, which Josiah Gogarty labelled as "surprisingly even-handed gender politics". Gogarty also noted similar lyrics themes, albeit with "much hornier" execution, on "BBW", although, some commentators singled out the lyric "So much ass [ash], you should be cremated" for criticism. Craig Jenkins of Vulture argued Drake's lyricism in the latter half of "Cheetah Print" was contradictory to the claim that "'innocent Drake' [was] never coming back" from "Make Them Know" on Iceman. "Stuck" features lyrics about being caught in a relationship limbo.

== Critical reception ==
Professional ratings
Aggregate scores
Source	Rating
Metacritic	68/100
Review scores
Source	Rating
AllMusic	3.5/5 stars
The Arts Desk	(Note: Score is shared with Iceman and Habibti.)
Consequence	C+
Financial Times	3/5 stars
The Guardian	2/5 stars
NME	3.5/5 stars
Pitchfork	8.0/10
Rolling Stone	4/5 stars
Stereoboard	2/5 stars
The Sydney Morning Herald	4/5 stars

Maid of Honour was met with generally positive reviews. At Metacritic, which assigns a normalized rating out of 100 to reviews from professional publications, the album received an average score of 68, based on eight reviews.

Jeff Ihaza for Rolling Stone called Maid of Honour the "crown jewel" of the three-album release, and Drake's best work since his mixtape More Life. He praised its varied production, saying there "isn't another rapper operating at Drake's scale engaging this deeply with niche Black regional sounds", and specifically highlighted "Cheetah Print", "Amazing Shape", "Hoe Phase" and "Outside Tweaking". He concluded by saying "[the] album draws from Black musical traditions that are often maligned in the mainstream... Queer nightlife, dancehall, and house music [all] braid seamlessly across the album". Writing for The Arts Desk, Thomas H. Green wrote that Maid of Honour "is musically more fun" than Iceman or Habibti, highlighting "Cheetah Print" and "BBW", but criticized the album for "drip[ping] with sweaty tumescent male lust".

Writing for Pitchfork, Alphonse Pierre called Maid of Honour "the best album in Drake's comeback trilogy", praising its varied production for being "completely unpredictable" (highlighting "Hoe Phase", "New Bestie" and "BBW", in particular) and Drake's performance on "Cheetah Print", "Stuck", "Amazing Shape" and "Princess", concluding that Drake can "pick up the pieces and reclaim his title as hip-hop’s ultimate hitmaker". NME's Kyann-Sian Williams praised "Amazing Shape" as "a warm ode to Drake’s long-standing connection to Jamaican music" and labelled "Cheetah Print" as "ridiculous" but "dumb enough to become accidentally addictive". In a review for the Financial Times, Ludovic Hunter-Tilney wrote that Drake's "talents shine" on Maid of Honour and said that its "ribald" content is handled in "a much livelier, more comical fashion [than Habibti], abetted by cameos from Sexyy Red and Central Cee". UK publication Stereoboard praised "Which One" as the highlight of the album.

In a mixed review of the three albums, Roisin O'Connor of The Independent called Maid of Honour "a breath of fresh air" for Drake, commending the album for "its playful skits, catchy melodies, smart samples and guest features". O'Connor singled out "Amazing Shape" with Popcaan, the "infectious" "Which One" with Central Cee, and Drake's "low [and] sexy" performance on "BBW" for praise. Robert Moran of The Sydney Morning Herald said that "Maid of Honour [shows] Drake [is a] cosmopolitan pop innovator", praising the production on "New Bestie" and "Hoe Phase" and also commended "Road Trips", "Stuck" and "Cheetah Print". He also wrote that the album "[is] sprawling, experimental, weird, fun and brimming with hooks. It feels like a template for tomorrow’s pop charts". Craig Jenkins of Vulture called Maid of Honour the "highlight of the [three-album] package", praised it for its inclusion and performances of its female artists, and praised the production on "Stuck" and "Goose and the Juice", concluding by writing, "[the album] lounges almost entirely in a spirit of moonlit longing, yielding some of the most left-field moves of Drake's [career]".

== Commercial performance ==
Within 24 hours of the triple-album release, Drake broke the record for being most-streamed artist in a single day in 2026 on Spotify and registered a 1,100% increase in simultaneous listeners on Apple Music, causing each streaming service to crash and suffer glitches due to the high listener demand; over 5,000 users reported issues with Spotify on the day of the triple-album release.

In the United States, Maid of Honour debuted at number three on the Billboard 200 chart, selling 110,000 album-equivalent units. This consisted of 104,000 streaming-equivalent units (equaling 105.48 million on-demand official streams of the album's 14 tracks) and 6,000 pure album sales; cumulatively, Drake amassed 687,000 album-equivalent units sold in the US for the three albums in their first week. With Iceman and Habibti debuting at number one and two, respectively, Drake became the first artist ever to hold the top three spots on the Billboard 200 concurrently. In its second week, Maid of Honour sold 43,000 album-equivalent units, dropping to number eight on the Billboard 200, and in its third week, it sold 31,000 album-equivalent units, dropping ten spots to number eighteen on the Billboard 200.

In the United Kingdom, Maid of Honour opened at number six on the UK Albums Chart, while Iceman reached number one and Habibti opened at number seven. This made Drake the first artist to debut three studio albums inside the UK top 10 simultaneously, and marked his fifteenth, sixteenth and seventeenth albums to debut in the UK top 10. In Australia, Maid of Honour debuted at number five on the ARIA Charts, while Iceman reached number one and Habibti opened at number six. The releases marked Drake's fourteenth, fifteenth and sixteenth Australian top 10 albums and made him the first artist to debut three new albums in the same week in the top 10. In New Zealand, Maid of Honour debuted at number six on the New Zealand Albums Chart, while Iceman reached number one and Habibti opened at number five.

== Track listing ==
Maid of Honour track listing
No.	Title	Writer(s)	Producer(s)	Length
1.	"Hoe Phase"	Aubrey Graham; Diamante Blackmon; Francisco Zecca; Richard Zastenker; Johannes Klahr; Gino Nano; Bradley Baker; Octavian Godji; Sandra Lawrence; Samantha Lawrence; David Steele; Dominic Frontiere; James Brown; Charles Bobbitt	Gordo; Zecca; Liohn; Klahr; Nano; B4U^{[a]}; O Lil Angel^{[a]}	3:23
2.	"Road Trips"	Graham; Blackmon; Zecca; Jasper Helderman; Kaushik Barua; Aaron Thomas; Sandy Soliman; Tyshane Thompson; Adam Piggot; Paul Agyei; Duncan Carolan; Nyan Lieberthal; Kareem Hussein; Christopher Terrell-Fumbanks; Cedric Hill; Daryl Simmons	Gordo; Zecca; Alvaro; Kid Masterpiece	4:03
3.	"Outside Tweaking" (featuring Stunna Sandy)	Graham; Soliman; Blackmon; Baker; Zecca; Zastenker; Klahr; Shemar Pierre; Michael Schrock; Daniel Dodd; Nile Goveia; Alexander Lustig; Ricardo Rahanmegan	Gordo; B4U; Zecca; Liohn; Klahr; Shemar Pierre; Kouture; Brinx Parker; Govi; Alex Lustig; Josias	3:10
4.	"Cheetah Print" (featuring Sexyy Red)	Graham; Janae Wherry; T. Thompson; Samuel Jiménez; Edgar Ferrera; Kim Min-ji; Demiko Wilson; John Julian; William Perry Jr.; Hudson Beaudy; Marvel Thompson; Walter Gold; John Gluck; Herb Wiener; Seymour Gottlieb	Beam; Smash David; SkipOnDaBeat	3:22
5.	"Which One" (featuring Central Cee)	Graham; Oakley Caesar-Su; T. Thompson; Ozan Yildirim; Baker; Godji; Lars Cristen; Vincent Dubinsky	Oz; B4U; O Lil Angel; Bonboi^{[c]}; DJ Cruz^{[c]}	2:49
6.	"Amazing Shape" (featuring Popcaan)	Graham; Andrae Sutherland; Blackmon; Baker; Zecca; Godji; T. Thompson; Hasan Matthews	Gordo; B4U; Zecca; O Lil Angel; Beam^{[a]}	2:56
7.	"BBW"	Graham; Baker; Godji; Pierre; Lyle Winkerprins; Denise Belfon; Harkness Taitt; Anastas Hackett; Matthews; Elbernita "Twinkie" Clark; Ryan Parker; Len Drum	B4U; O Lil Angel; Pierre; Whiskerprince	3:31
8.	"True Bestie" (featuring Iconic Savvy)	Graham; Alzoria Sanders; Blackmon; Zecca; Max Waller; Baker; Matthews; Dimitri Tiomkin	Gordo; Zecca; Waller; B4U^{[a]}	2:28
9.	"Where's Your Stuff" (Interlude)	Graham; Baker; Godji; Scottie Thompson	B4U; O Lil Angel; S. Thompson	0:52
10.	"New Bestie"	Graham; Blackmon; Jiménez; Zecca; Zastenker; Klahr; Joshua Parker; Waller; Marlon Betancourth; Justin Junagadala; Hadi Hassan; Alejandro Villacorta; Jonathan Zibi	Drake; Gordo; Smash David; Zecca; Liohn; Klahr; OG Parker; Waller; Digital Jet; Mxssivh; Product; Andro Andro; Jon Milli	4:19
11.	"Q&A"	Graham; Baker; Godji; Arham Paul; Dylan Hyde; Savva Lyalin; Jadon Luke; R. Cummings	B4U; O Lil Angel; APMelodies; Hyde; Royall; Stack!e; SavBeats	3:43
12.	"Stuck"	Graham; Blackmon; Jiménez; Zecca; Zastenker; Klahr; Sean Turk; Nicolas Baran	Gordo; Smash David; Zecca; Liohn; Klahr; Turk; Nico Baran	2:57
13.	"Goose and the Juice"	Graham; Blackmon; Zecca; Waller; Joia Jeffries; Arnaud Mercier	Gordo; Zecca; Waller	4:23
14.	"Princess"	Graham; Damian Danner; Baker; Godji; Dodd	B4U; O Lil Angel; Brinx Parker	3:13
Total length:				45:09

=== Track notes ===
- Full credits are not available at this time for the songs "Outside Tweaking", "Which One", "New Bestie", and "Stuck".
- "Road Trips" features additional vocals from Teezo Touchdown and Stunna Sandy.
- "Stuck" features uncredited additional vocals from Qendresa.

=== Sample and interpolation credits ===
- "Hoe Phase" contains a sample of "Give It All You've Got", written by Derrick Rahming, as performed by Afro-Rican.
- "Road Trips" contains a sample of "Swangin' and Bangin'", written by Cedric Hill, as performed by E.S.G.
- "Cheetah Print" contains samples of "(It Goes Like) Nanana", written by Kim Min-ji, as performed by Peggy Gou; "Popular", written by Demiko Wilson and John Earl Julian, as performed by Born Bad!; and interpolations of "Cha Cha Slide", written by Willie Perry, Jr., as performed by DJ Casper; "It's My Party", written by Walter Gold, John Gluck, Jr., Herb Weiner, and Seymour Gottlieb, as performed by Lesley Gore; and uncredited interpolations of "Rich Baby Daddy", written by Aubrey Graham, Janae Wherry, Solána Rowe, Diamanté Blackmon, Richard Zastenker, Johannes Klahr, Benjamin Saint Fort, Douglas Ford, Shivam Barot, Yuval Chain, Florence Welch, Isabella Summers, and Thomas Schaeferdieck, as performed by Drake featuring Sexyy Red and SZA.
- "Which One" contains uncredited interpolations of "Work", written by Robyn Fenty, Graham, Jahron Braithwaite, Rupert Thomas, Matthew Samuels, Allen Ritter, and Monte Moir, as performed by Rihanna featuring Drake; and "Wannabe", written by Melanie Brown, Melanie Chisholm, Emma Bunton, Geraldine Halliwell, Victoria Adams, Matt Rowe, and Richard Stannard, as performed by the Spice Girls.
- "Amazing Shape" contains elements of "Who Am I (Sim Simma)", written by Anthony Davis and Jeremy Harding, as performed by Beenie Man.
- "BBW" contains a sample of "Work", written and performed by Denise Belfon.
- "True Bestie" contains a sample of "PSA", written by Alzoria Sanders, as performed by Iconic Savvy.
- "Where's Your Stuff" (Interlude) contains a sample of a TikTok video by youfoundivyy.
- "New Bestie" contains an uncredited sample of "One Dance", written by Graham, Paul Jefferies, Ayodeji Balogun, Noah Shebib, Errol Reid, Luke Reid, Kyla Smith, Corey Johnson, and Logan Sama, as performed by Drake featuring Wizkid and Kyla.

== Charts ==
Chart performance for Maid of Honour
Chart (2026)	Peak position
Australian Albums (ARIA)	6
Australian Hip Hop/R&B Albums (ARIA)	2
Austrian Albums (Ö3 Austria)	7
Belgian Albums (Ultratop Flanders)	19
Belgian Albums (Ultratop Wallonia)	30
Canadian Albums (Billboard)	2
Danish Albums (Hitlisten)	10
Dutch Albums (Album Top 100)	14
Finnish Albums (Suomen virallinen lista)	43
French Albums (SNEP)	31
German Albums (Offizielle Top 100)	38
Hungarian Albums (MAHASZ)	30
Irish Albums (Official Charts)	11
Italian Albums (FIMI)	53
Japanese Download Albums (Billboard Japan)	77
Lithuanian Albums (AGATA)	10
New Zealand Albums (RMNZ)	6
Nigerian Albums (TurnTable)	22
Norwegian Albums (IFPI Norge)	18
Portuguese Albums (AFP)	7
Swedish Albums (Sverigetopplistan)	10
Swedish Hip-Hop Albums (Sverigetopplistan)	3
Swiss Albums (Schweizer Hitparade)	4
UK Albums (Official Charts)	6
UK R&B Albums (Official Charts)	9
US Billboard 200	3
US Top R&B/Hip-Hop Albums (Billboard)	3

== Release history ==
Release dates and formats for Maid of Honour
Region	Date	Label(s)	Format(s)	Edition(s)	Ref.
Various	May 15, 2026	OVO; Republic	Digital download; streaming	Standard	
