= Amazing Shape =

2026 song by Drake featuring Popcaan

Song by Drake featuring Popcaan

from the album Maid of Honour
- Released: May 15, 2026
- Genre: Dancehall; reggae
- Length: 2:56
- Label: OVO; Republic
- Songwriters: Aubrey Drake Graham; Andrae Sutherland; Diamante Blackmon; Bradley Baker; Francisco Zecca; Ephrem Lopez Jr.; Nathan Butts; Max Waller
- Producers: Gordo; Zecca; RiotUSA; Butts; Waller; B4U

Audio video
- "Amazing Shape" on YouTube

"Amazing Shape" is a song by Canadian rapper Drake featuring Jamaican dancehall artist Popcaan, released on May 15, 2026, as the sixth track on Drake's album Maid of Honour.

== Background ==
"Amazing Shape" is Popcaan's first credited feature on an official Drake album, following years of close collaboration between the two artists. Their prior collaborations, "Twist & Turn," "All I Need," and "We Caa Done", had all appeared on Popcaan's own projects rather than Drake's, while an earlier Popcaan contribution to Drake's 2016 song "Controlla" was recorded but ultimately left off the official album version. Popcaan had previously been signed to Drake's OVO Sound label, releasing the 2019 mixtape Vanquish, followed by Fixtape (2020) and Great Is He (2023), before going independent.

== Composition ==
Multiple critics described "Amazing Shape" as continuing Drake's history of dancehall influenced records. Rolling Out's Eddy "Precise" Lamarre wrote that the song carries "a strong island vibe," noting that Drake and Popcaan "have shown before that they understand each other musically," and that the track "gives the album another strong Caribbean moment." Dazed described the song as an example of "Popcaan-style deconstructed dancehall" within the broader Maid of Honour project.

== Reception ==
Reception to "Amazing Shape" was mixed. Billboard's Armon Sadler ranked the song 13th out of the album's 14 tracks, writing that while "[I]t's clear what they were going for," the song was "very underwhelming," with "no lines" standing out and "just an X-factor missing from the equation," particularly given Drake and Popcaan's stronger past collaborations. SHIFTER Magazine's Kevin Bourne was more positive, calling the song one of the album's "bright spots" and writing that "reggae vibes Drake is always on point," singling it out, alongside "Which One" and "Road Trips", as among the few tracks on Maid of Honour he felt were worth keeping.

== Chart performance ==
"Amazing Shape" debuted at number 76 on the Billboard Hot 100 (dated May 30, 2026), marking Popcaan's first-ever entry on the chart, and at number 43 on the Billboard Canadian Hot 100, his fourth entry on that chart and his second-highest-charting appearance there, behind his earlier Drake collaboration "We Caa Done," which had debuted at number 36.

Speaking to the Jamaica Observer following the chart debut, Popcaan described the milestone as "a blessing," saying, "God is good, give thanks for the blessing," and characterized his musical partnership with Drake as "undefeated."

"Amazing Shape" was one of five collaborator tracks from Maid of Honour to produce first-time Hot 100 entries that week, alongside Molly Santana's "Ran to Atlanta" (No. 2), Qendresa's "Slap the City" (No. 39), Stunna Sandy's "Outside Tweaking" (No. 65), and Iconic Savvy's "True Bestie" (No. 67).

== Charts ==
Chart performance for "Amazing Shape"
| Chart (2026) | Peak position |
|---|---|
| Canada Hot 100 (Billboard) | 43 |
| Global 200 (Billboard) | 154 |
| US Billboard Hot 100 | 76 |

== Credits and personnel ==
Attributed by several sources.

- Drake – vocals, songwriter
- Popcaan – vocals, songwriter
- Diamante Blackmon – songwriter, producer
- Bradley Baker – songwriter
- Francisco Zecca – songwriter, producer
- Ephrem Lopez Jr. – songwriter, producer
- Nathan Butts – songwriter, producer
- Max Waller – songwriter, producer
- B4U – producer
