= BBW (song) =

Song by Drake

from the album Maid of Honour
- Released: May 15, 2026
- Genre: House; Baile funk; Soca
- Length: 3:31
- Label: OVO; Republic
- Songwriters: Aubrey Drake Graham; Diamante Blackmon; Bradley Baker; Francisco Zecca; Shemar Pierre; Max Waller; Lyle Winkerprins; Denise Belfon; Harkness Taitt; Anastas Hackett
- Producers: Gordo; B4U; Zecca; Pierre; Waller; Whiskerprince; Hackett

Audio video
- "BBW" on YouTube

"BBW" (acronym for Big Beautiful Woman) is a song by Canadian rapper Drake, released on May 15, 2026, as the seventh track on his album Maid of Honour.

== Background and sampling ==
"BBW" prominently samples "Work", the 1998 soca song by Trinidadian vocalist Denise Belfon, built around her "put your back in it/just a little more!" refrain. DancehallMag noted that the sample drew renewed attention from Caribbean listeners, given that "Work" had previously been sampled on Shenseea and Megan Thee Stallion's 2022 single "Lick," which itself became the subject of a US$10 million copyright lawsuit brought by "Work" producer Anastas "Pupa Nas-T" Hackett against Shenseea and Interscope, that suit was later settled.

According to Billboard, Drake's use of Belfon's vocals on "BBW" led to a significant legal and financial breakthrough for Belfon, who said Drake's team pressured Pupa Nas-T into agreeing, for the first time in 28 years, to allow her to receive royalties from recordings sampling "Work." Belfon told Billboard: "Because of Drake's team, the producer of 'Work' was forced to say 'yes.' For 28 years, he had [refused to sign off on my receiving my royalties]. With Drake adding my vocals on 'BBW,' [Pupa] agreed that, moving forward, I would receive my appropriate payment." A source close to the dispute told Billboard that Drake's OVO team worked to clear the sample with the consent of all interested parties, including Belfon, and helped facilitate a negotiation between Pupa Nas-T and Harkness Taitt, "Work"'s primary songwriter, with the assistance of Trinidadian copyright specialist Fabien Alfonso. Complex reported that Belfon also credited Drake's outreach as demonstrating how he "gives high-striving women their credit where it's due," pointing to a separate Toronto event around the same time at which Drake surprised ten women entrepreneurs with $50,000 each, along with luxury vehicles and Birkin bags.

Pupa Nas-T disputed aspects of Belfon's account, telling Billboard that Belfon "is not a songwriter or copyright owner of the composition" of "Work," and that questions of performer compensation, master-recording royalties, and songwriting ownership were "separate matters" that should not be conflated. As of the Billboard report, Belfon said she was continuing to seek backpay for approximately 8,000 previously released recordings that had sampled her "Work" vocals, on behalf of both herself and Taitt, a claim Pupa Nas-T said he did not accept as substantiated.

== Composition ==
Mixtape Madness's Charlie Edmondson described the song's "sexual imagery" as inducing "cringe," but noted that "BBW" transitions into "a distorted baile funk section that sounds huge but feels bolted-on." Writing for Medium's Modern Music Analysis, Josh Herring described the track as built around "dirty, hyper-boosted synths" that fill space between some of Drake's "more intentionally smoother vocals," and noted the song's connection to Drake's 2023 track "BBL Interlude," joking that Drake likely originally wanted to title the song "PAWG."

== Reception ==
Reception to "BBW" was mixed. Rolling Out's Eddy "Precise" Lamarre credited Drake for "highlighting a group of women that doesn't get enough love publicly," writing that the sentiment behind the song was "appreciated," while noting the track's dance-oriented sound was "a bit of a surprise" given that his 2023 song "BBL Interlude" had instead been a ballad.

Mixtape Madness was more critical of the song's lyrical content, though it acknowledged the production's baile funk pivot as a highlight moment. By contrast, Josh Herring of Modern Music Analysis was considerably more positive, naming "BBW" one of his three favorite tracks from the album, alongside "Stuck" and "Road Trips", in an overall review that scored Maid of Honour 7.0 out of 10 and called it the strongest of Drake's three simultaneous album releases.

== Charts ==
Chart performance for "BBW"
Chart (2026)	Peak position
Canada Hot 100 (Billboard)	54
Global 200 (Billboard)	157
US Billboard Hot 100	74

== Credits and personnel ==
Attributed by several sources.

- Drake – vocals, songwriter
- Diamante Blackmon – songwriter, producer
- Bradley Baker – songwriter
- Francisco Zecca – songwriter, producer
- Shemar Pierre – songwriter, producer
- Max Waller – songwriter, producer
- Lyle Winkerprins – songwriter, producer
- B4U – producer
- Denise Belfon – vocals, songwriting (sampled)
- Harkness Taitt – songwriting (sampled)
- Anastas Hackett – songwriting, production (sampled)
