= New Bestie =

Song by Drake

from the album Maid of Honour
- Released: May 15, 2026
- Genre: Dancehall; Afrobeats
- Length: 4:19
- Label: OVO; Republic
- Songwriters: Aubrey Drake Graham; Diamante Blackmon; Samuel Jimenez; Francisco Zecca; Johannes Klahr; Richard Zastenker; Max Waller; Marlon Betancourth; Justin Junagadala; Hadi Hassan; Alejandro Villacorta; Joshua Parker; Jonathan Zibi
- Producers: Drake; Gordo; Smash David; Zecca; Klahr; Zastenker; Waller; Betancourth; Junagadala; Hassan; OG Parker; Zibi; Andro Andro

Audio video
- "Where's Your Stuff" on YouTube

"New Bestie" is a song by Canadian rapper Drake, released May 15, 2026, as a track on his album Maid of Honour.

== Background ==
Longtime Drake collaborator Gordo told Rolling Stone that he produced "New Bestie" alongside several other club-oriented tracks on Maid of Honour, but noted that Drake personally reworked much of the production on the song beyond what Gordo had initially submitted, as stated by Complex.

== Composition and style ==
Critics described "New Bestie" as blending dancehall and Afrobeats influences. Medium's Josh Herring wrote that the song is "subtle" and "afro-inspired," eventually "pick[ing] up into full afrobeat via the Caribbean," describing the effect as being "practically transported to Jamaica." The Fader's Hajin Yoo wrote that the track "shifts into a Jersey club beat" midway through, with Drake's "patois-inflected delivery" recalling dancehall artist Vybz Kartel and Drake's own More Life era. Pitchfork's Alphonse Pierre characterized the song as a breakup anthem that could be read as an allegory for Drake's "crumbling relationship with hip-hop," writing that Drake "sounds more hurt by the possibility of losing his spot than he ever did about losing Lorraine or Bria or Erika."

== Reception ==
Reception to "New Bestie" was largely positive, though not unanimous. Billboard's Armon Sadler ranked it fifth among the album's 14 tracks, writing that the song "takes elements of More Life and Honestly, Nevermind and creates musical excellence," praising "the groove, the beat-switch, the patois." The Fader's Hajin Yoo was similarly enthusiastic, writing "I never thought I'd say this again, but I love this Drake song!" The Fader also included "New Bestie" among its favorite tracks from Drake's three simultaneous releases, despite ultimately leaving it off a separate feature reimagining the albums as a single, condensed record "in service of thematic consistency."

Differently, Anthony Fantano, writing for The Needle Drop, was critical of the song, describing it as "another very low-key, sleepy, forgettable, watered-down dancehall cut" and arguing that Drake was "not really adding any variation or exploration to this sound as he continues to attempt it."

== Charts ==
Chart performance for "New Bestie"
Chart (2026)	Peak position
Canada Hot 100 (Billboard)	50
Global 200 (Billboard)	125
US Billboard Hot 100	72

== Credits and personnel ==
Attributed by several sources.

- Aubrey Drake Graham – songwriter, producer
- Diamante Blackmon – songwriter, producer
- Samuel Jimenez – songwriter, producer
- Francisco Zecca – songwriter, producer
- Johannes Klahr – songwriter, producer
- Richard Zastenker – songwriter, producer
- Max Waller – songwriter, producer
- Marlon Betancourth – songwriter, producer
- Justin Junagadala – songwriter, producer
- Hadi Hassan – songwriter, producer
- Alejandro Villacorta – songwriter
- Joshua Parker – songwriter, producer
- Jonathan Zibi – songwriter, producer
- Andro Andro – producer
