= Killy discography =

- Studio albums: 3
- EPs: 1
- Singles: 8

Canadian rapper Killy has released four studio albums, one extended play and a number of singles. This is in addition to the music he has "unofficially" released on his SoundCloud.

== Albums ==
=== Studio albums ===
Title	Album details	Peak	Certifications
Title	Album details	CAN	Certifications
Surrender Your Soul	Released: March 6, 2018; Label: Secret Sound Club; Format: Digital download, streaming	18	MC: Gold
Light Path 8	Released: June 14, 2019; Label: Secret Sound Club; Format: Digital download, streaming	24	
Killstreak 2	Released: May 28, 2021; Label: Epic; Format: Digital download, streaming	—	
Killstreak 2 (Deluxe)	Released: September 24, 2021; Label: Epic; Format: Digital download, streaming	—	

=== Extended plays ===
Title	EP details	Peak
Title	EP details	CAN
KILLSTREAK	Released: September 15, 2018; Label: Secret Sound Club; Format: Digital download, streaming	28

== Singles ==
=== As lead artist ===
Title	Year	Peaks	Certifications	Album
Title	Year	CAN	Certifications	Album
"Killamanjaro"	2017	—	MC: Platinum	Surrender Your Soul
"Distance"	2017	—	MC: Platinum	Surrender Your Soul
"No Romance" (with 16yrold)	2017	—		Non-album singles
"Forecast"	2017	—	MC: Gold	Non-album singles
"Beautiful 00*"	2018	—		Non-album singles
"Very Scary"	2018	—		Non-album singles
"No Sad No Bad"	2018	65	MC: Platinum	Surrender Your Soul
"Anti Everybody"	2018	—	MC: Gold	Killstreak
"Swag Flu"	2019	—		Non-album singles
"Triple Helix"	2019	—	MC: Gold	Non-album singles
"Vendetta"	2019	—		Non-album singles
"Drought" (with 16yrold)	2019	—		Non-album singles
"Fast Life" (with Gab3)	2020	—		Non-album singles
"Sailor Moon"	2020	—		KILLSTREAK 2

=== As featured artist ===
Title	Year	Peaks
Title	Year	CAN Hot Digital Songs
"Rivals" (No Jumper feat. Killy and Smooky MarGielaa)	2018	—
"Katana" (Ramriddlz feat. Killy)	2018	—
"Reasons" (a4 feat. Killy and Sega)	2019	—
"C'est La Vie" (Sega feat. Killy)	2019	—
"Better" (Cassiøpeia feat. Killy and Boi-1da)	2019	19
"VVs" (6ixBuzz feat. Killy and Houdini)	2020	—

=== Other certified songs ===
Title	Year	Peaks	Certifications	Album
Title	Year	CAN	Certifications	Album
"Doomsday"	2018	—	MC: Gold	Surrender Your Soul
"Eye for an Eye"	2019	—	MC: Gold	Light Path 8

== Guest appearances ==
List of non-single guest appearances, showing other performing artists
Title	Year	Other artist(s)	Album
"No Mistakes"	2016	Nessly	Still Finessin' 1.5 (Unreleased)
"Headlock"	2018	Carnage	Battered Bruised & Bloody
"Icey"	2018	CMDWN, Castro Guapo & Fiji	Atlanada 2
"Outta Time"	2019	Lexie Liu	2030
