= Q&A (Drake song) =

Song by Drake

from the album Maid of Honour
- Released: May 15, 2026
- Genre: Brazilian funk; R&B
- Length: 3:43
- Label: OVO; Republic
- Songwriters: Aubrey Drake Graham; Bradley Baker; Octavian Godji; Arham Paul; Dylan Hyde
- Producers: Drake; B4U; O Lil Angel; APMelodies; Hyde; Royall; SavBeats; Stack!e

Audio video
- "Q&A" on YouTube

"Q&A" is a song by Canadian rapper Drake, released May 15, 2026, as a track on his album Maid of Honour.

== Background and production ==
"Q&A" was produced by several producers, including then-16-year-old Canadian producer Arham Paul, who goes by the moniker ap.melodies (a.k.a. APMelodies), making it one of two songs he produced for Drake that month alongside "Classic" on Habibti. Paul, a student from Markham, Ontario, told CBC Kids News that he connected with members of Drake's production team online, and produced the song's beat overnight after being asked to help finish a track on short notice. He described "Q&A" as blending Brazilian funk with R&B, noting that Drake had "hasn't really hopped on Brazilian funk, at least not Brazilian funk and R&B mixed together" before.

== Composition and style ==
Reviewers similarly identified the song's Brazilian funk influence. Pitchfork's Alphonse Pierre described the "Brazilian funk of 'Q&A'" as lacking "edge," writing that it sounded "more like the sexy drill rip-offs" and suggesting the song might have benefited from a guest appearance by a Brazilian funk artist such as DJ Ramon Sucesso. Billboard's Armon Sadler described the song as "frantic," writing that lyrically, Drake spends the track "asking a woman make-or-break questions," in a manner suggesting the two had "just met at a party."

== Reception ==
Reception to "Q&A" was mixed. Billboard's Sadler ranked the song seventh among the album's 14 tracks, calling it "an ideal song to dance to" but suggesting that a rap verse "might have actually heightened the record," given that Drake's singing delivery elsewhere on the track was "mostly one-dimensional." Anthony Fantano, writing for The Needle Drop, offered a somewhat similar review, describing the song as "a vibe for sure" that nonetheless "goes nowhere fast."

== Charts ==
Chart performance for "Q&A"
| Chart (2026) | Peak position |
|---|---|
| Canada Hot 100 (Billboard) | 63 |
| US Billboard Hot 100 | 85 |

== Credits and personnel ==
Attributed by several sources.

- Aubrey Drake Graham – songwriter, producer
- Bradley Baker – songwriter, producer
- Octavian Godji – songwriter, producer
- Arham Paul – songwriter, producer
- Dylan Hyde – songwriter, producer
- Royall – producer
- SavBeats – producer
- Stack!e – producer
