= True Bestie =

Song by Drake featuring Iconic Savvy

from the album Maid of Honour
- Released: May 15, 2026
- Genre: Chicago juke
- Length: 2:28
- Label: OVO; Republic
- Songwriters: Aubrey Drake Graham; Diamante Blackmon; Bradley Baker; Francisco Zecca; Max Waller; Daniel Dodd
- Producers: Gordo; Zecca; Waller; B4U; Brinx Parker

Audio video
- "True Bestie" on YouTube

"True Bestie" is a song by Canadian rapper Drake featuring American rapper Iconic Savvy, released May 15, 2026, as the eighth track from Drake's album Maid of Honour.

== Background ==
"True Bestie" was produced by Gordo, (Note: Alongside Francisco Zecca, Max Waller, B4U, and Brinx Parker.) who told Rolling Stone that he produced the majority of the club-oriented material on Maid of Honour, including "True Bestie," "Amazing Shape," "Stuck," and several other tracks on the album, as recounted by Complex.

== Composition and style ==
Critics characterized "True Bestie" as drawing on Chicago juke rap. Writing for Pitchfork, Alphonse Pierre noted the track's juke influence but felt its tempo ran "far too slow." The Fader's Kylah Williams similarly described Iconic Savvy's contribution as "Chicago ass-shaking juke," framing the song as part of a broader lineage of artists reworking the Jersey club sound. Rolling Out's Eddy "Precise" Lamarre wrote that Iconic Savvy brings "South Side Chicago vibes" to the record, adding that the song's title "speaks to friendship, nightlife and the kind of bond that exists when women are getting ready together."

== Reception ==
Reception to "True Bestie" was generally positive, in comparison to some of the more polarized reactions to other cuts on Maid of Honour. Complex included it among the album's highlights in its first-listen coverage, noting that Iconic Savvy was one of three young female rappers on Drake's trio of albums, alongside Molly Santana and Stunna Sandy, whose features "steal their respective tracks outright." Rolling Out named the song a standout track on the album, which it rated four and a half out of five stars. Writing for Medium's Modern Music Analysis, Josh Herring described the song's "slick sliminess" as "well-balanced" against the following track, "New Bestie."

The Fader's Kylah Williams gave the song one of the more enthusiastic write-ups among contemporary reviews, quoting the song's hook, "I need you to put me on the loudest speaker in the house. Or put some headphones on right now", and writing that the "mandate was 100% needed" given how much the track "bumps." In a separate piece imagining an edited, single-album version of Drake's simultaneous releases, The Fader included "True Bestie" on its condensed 24-track sequence.

== Charts ==
Chart performance for "True Bestie"
Chart (2026)	Peak position
Canada Hot 100 (Billboard)	58
Global 200 (Billboard)	164
US Billboard Hot 100	67

== Credits and personnel ==
Attributed by several sources.

- Drake – vocals, songwriter
- Diamante Blackmon – songwriter, producer
- Bradley Baker – songwriter
- Francisco Zecca – songwriter, producer
- Max Waller – songwriter, producer
- Daniel Dodd – songwriter
- B4U – producer
- Brinx Parker – producer
