= Outside Tweaking =

2026 song by Drake featuring Stunna Sandy

Song by Drake featuring Stunna Sandy

from the album Maid of Honour
- Released: May 15, 2026
- Genre: Juke; Jersey club; dancehall
- Length: 3:10
- Label: OVO; Republic
- Songwriters: Aubrey Drake Graham; Sandy Soliman; Diamante Blackmon; Bradley Baker; Richard Zastenker; Francisco Zecca; Johannes Klahr; Shemar Pierre; Michael Schrock; Daniel Dodd; Nile Goveia; Alexander Lustig; Ricardo Rahanmegan
- Producers: Gordo; B4U; Liohn; Zecca; Klahr; Pierre; Kouture; Brinx Parker; Govi; Lustig; Josias

Audio video
- "Outside Tweaking" on YouTube

"Outside Tweaking" (a.k.a. "Outside Tweakin") is a song by Canadian rapper Drake featuring American rapper Stunna Sandy, released on May 15, 2026, as the third track on Drake's album Maid of Honour.

== Background ==
"Outside Tweaking" is one of Stunna Sandy's best known singles to date. The Brooklyn-born, Egyptian-American rapper, then 23, had previously drawn attention with her 2024 single "Make It Look Sexy," which drew comparisons to Ice Spice for its "soft, monotone voice". Stunna Sandy also appears in the music video for Drake's "Plot Twist" and is featured on the cover of Drake's companion album Habibti.

== Composition ==
CBC described "Outside Tweaking" as drawing on Chicago juke production. Where Is The Buzz similarly described the track as fusing juke, Jersey club, and dancehall music. Rolling Out critic Eddy "Precise" Lamarre described the song as "[fiting] perfectly within the world of [Maid of Honour]", noting that the energy "feels built for social media clips, party videos and late-night car rides."

Writing for Mixtape Madness, Charlie Edmondson described the track as a "curveball" featuring "unorthodox double-tracked delivery" from Drake, with Stunna Sandy "[flowing] nonchalantly" over drum patterns he compared to the style of Death Grips.

== Reception ==
Billboard ranked "Outside Tweaking" eighth out of the fourteen tracks on Maid of Honour, with critic Armon Sadler calling it "one of the most unique tracks the father of one has ever made", praising the way the song "elevates even further" once Stunna Sandy enters. Consequence's Kiana Fitzgerald included the song among examples of Drake's "A&R" instincts across the three-album release, noting his history of platforming rising collaborators such as Stunna Sandy. Following the song's release, Stunna Sandy posted a 13-second clip of her verse online, which Where Is The Buzz reported drove a rapid rise in her Spotify listenership and generated widespread online reaction, with some commenters praising Drake for platforming her.

== Chart performance ==
The song debuted at number 65 on the Billboard Hot 100, marking Stunna Sandy's first appearance on the chart. Drake's three-album rollout produced five such first-time Hot 100 debuts among his collaborators that week, also including Molly Santana, Qendresa, Iconic Savvy, and Popcaan. Stunna Sandy was also enlisted for the fourth episode of Drake's Iceman livestream series. The song also appeared on Spotify's Global Impact List for the first half of 2026, which tracks the most-streamed songs by Canadian artists outside Canada. "Outside Tweaking" ranked among Drake's 40 entries on the 50-song list, part of what Billboard Canada described as Drake's "80%" dominance of the chart.

== Charts ==
Chart performance for "Outside Tweaking"
Chart (2026)	Peak position
Canada Hot 100 (Billboard)	56
Global 200 (Billboard)	145
US Billboard Hot 100	65

== Credits and personnel ==
Credits adapted from several sources.

- Drake – vocals, songwriter
- Stunna Sandy (Sandy Soliman) – vocals, songwriter
- Gordo – songwriter, producer
- Bradley Baker (B4U) – songwriter, producer
- Richard Zastenker (Liohn) – songwriter, producer
- Francisco Zecca – songwriter, producer
- Johannes Klahr – songwriter, producer
- Shemar Pierre – songwriter, producer
- Michael Schrock (Kouture) – songwriter, producer
- Daniel Dodd (Brinx Parker) – songwriter, producer
- Nile Goveia (Govi) – songwriter, producer
- Alexander Lustig – songwriter, producer
- Ricardo Rahanmegan (Josias) – songwriter, producer
