= Hoe Phase =

2026 song by Drake

Song by Drake

from the album Maid of Honour
- Released: May 15, 2026
- Genre: House; hip-hop
- Length: 3:23
- Label: OVO; Republic
- Producers: Gordo; Zecca; Liohn; Gino Nano; Klahr; B4U

"Hoe Phase" is a song by Canadian rapper Drake, released on May 15, 2026 as part of his studio album Maid of Honour. It includes a sample of "Give It All You've Got" by Afro-Rican.

== Composition ==
The song features a house-oriented sound reminiscent of Drake's album Honestly, Nevermind. It opens with a Miami bass sample of "Give It All You've Got", and also features a "moody" atmosphere that has been compared to his mixtape So Far Gone Drake raps on the second portion of the song. The beat builds up and eventually switches, after which it incorporates rhythms described as Afrobeats, amapiano, gqom and EDM.

== Critical reception ==
The song received generally positive reviews. Armon Sadler of Billboard ranked it as the third best song on Maid of Honour. Jeff Ihaza of Rolling Stone praised it as "a dazzling display of how dance music, unlike traditional hip-hop, thrives on fluidity, breezing between sonic textures with the seamlessness of a DJ's transitions."

== Charts ==
Chart performance for "Hoe Phase"
Chart (2026)	Peak position
Australia (ARIA)	57
Australia Hip-Hop/R&B (ARIA)	16
Canada Hot 100 (Billboard)	22
Global 200 (Billboard)	32
Greece International (IFPI)	89
South Africa Streaming (TOSAC)	31
US Billboard Hot 100	22
US Hot R&B/Hip-Hop Songs (Billboard)	18
