= Princess (Drake song) =

Song by Drake

from the album Maid of Honour
- Released: May 15, 2026
- Genre: Alternative rock; Pop punk
- Length: 3:13
- Label: OVO; Republic
- Songwriters: Aubrey Graham; Bradley Baker; Daniel Dodd
- Producers: B4U; Brinx Parker

"Princess" is a song by Canadian rapper Drake from his 2026 album Maid of Honour, on which it is the last track. It was written by Drake, Bradley Baker and Daniel Dodd, and produced by B4U and Brinx Parker. Critics wrote that the song's guitars sound different from the dance music that fills most of the album, and some compared it to pop punk and alternative rock.

== Composition ==
The song starts with a distorted guitar and Drake singing in falsetto. Charlie Edmondson of Mixtape Madness described the opening as "a bitcrushed guitar". Josh Herring of Medium called it "a grungy, almost pop punk cut reminiscent of Uzi". Armon Sadler of Billboard wrote that it was Drake's first real attempt at alternative rock, with an "electric guitar-laden beat".

In the lyrics, Drake sings about a woman who has passed out on a bathroom floor after drinking and taking drugs. Alphonse Pierre of Pitchfork compared the tone to a teenager's "coming-of-age whinefest[]". He also read the song as Drake worrying that his "dreams of being cool forever" are slipping away. Fantano described the same scene and said that placing the song last made sense because "the party's over" by that point in the album.

== Reception ==
Sadler ranked "Princess" 11th out of the 14 tracks on Maid of Honour. He liked Drake's vocals, but said the moments where the production softens did not last long enough, and he called the song "an idea that perhaps could have been amazing with more time and care". Herring also found it too short and thought it "could've been great" if Drake had done more with the sound. Fantano said the song needed a loud ending with guitars and drums, though he thought its sparse arrangement worked as a closer. Edmondson gave the album a mostly negative review, but called "Princess" "actually enjoyable". Pierre was less impressed with the song itself and compared Drake's delivery to that of a teenager.

== Charts ==
Chart performance for "Princess"
Chart (2026)	Peak position
Canada Hot 100 (Billboard)	80
US Billboard Hot 100	92

== Credits and personnel ==
Credits are from HotNewHipHop and other sources.

- Aubrey Drake Graham – songwriter
- Bradley "B4U" Baker – songwriter, producer
- Daniel Dodd – songwriter
- Brinx Parker – producer
