= Papi Gordo =

Studio album by Carnage
- Released: 30 October 2015
- Recorded: 2014–15
- Genre: Big room house; trap
- Length: 53:58
- Label: Ultra
- Producer: Carnage; Milo & Otis; Junkie Kid; Whyel; Timmy Trumpet; KSHMR; Dirtcaps; Atmozfears; Tomas Barfod

Carnage chronology
Papi Gordo (2015)	Young Martha (2017)

Singles from Papi Gordo
- 1. "Bricks" Released: 17 June 2014; 2. "WDYW" Released: 27 January 2015; 3. "I Like Tuh" Released: 24 February 2015; 4. "Toca" Released: 17 July 2015; 5. "November Skies" Released: 9 November 2015

Papi Gordo is the debut studio album by Guatemalan-American DJ and record producer Carnage, released on 30 November 2015. The album features three singles—"Bricks" featuring Migos, "WDYW" featuring Lil Uzi Vert, A$AP Ferg and Rich the Kid and "I Like Tuh" featuring ILoveMakonnen.

== Singles ==
The first single "Bricks" featuring Migos was released on 17 June 2014. The official music video was uploaded by Ultra Record's YouTube channel one day later.

The second single "WDYW" featuring Lil Uzi Vert, A$AP Ferg and Rich the Kid was released on 27 January 2015. The official music video of "WDYW" was also posted on Ultra Record's YouTube channel on 23 February 2015.

The third single "I Like Tuh" featuring ILoveMakonnen was released on 24 February 2015. Two official remixes of this song (one remix featuring Lil Wayne and G-Eazy while the other featuring Lincoln Jesser) were posted on Ultra Records' and Carnage's YouTube channels.

== Reception ==
Robert Salusbury of Outloud Culture stated that "Carnage's debut album descends further and further into unoriginality and is a complete travesty that makes it all too clear that Carnage has swiftly gone from a pioneer of the hardstyle scene, producing some of the liveliest tracks that Spinnin’ Records has seen, to an embarrassing dinosaur of the EDM scene."

== Track listing ==
No.	Title	Producer(s)	Length
1.	"Gordo" (with AraabMuzik featuring Rick Ross)	Carnage; AraabMuzik	1:44
2.	"Bricks" (featuring Migos)	Carnage	4:24
3.	"The Mud" (featuring OG Maco)	Carnage	3:57
4.	"RGV" (with Milo & Otis)	Carnage; Milo & Otis	3:17
5.	"I Like Tuh" (featuring ILoveMakonnen)	Carnage	3:09
6.	"WDYW" (featuring Lil Uzi Vert, ASAP Ferg and Rich the Kid)	Carnage; Charlie Heat	3:53
7.	"BTFWD" (with Junkie Kid)	Carnage; Junkie Kid	4:32
8.	"The Sound" (with Junkie Kid)	Carnage; Junkie Kid	4:06
9.	"Bootshaus" (with Whyel)	Carnage; Whyel	4:17
10.	"Toca" (with Timmy Trumpet and Kshmr)	Carnage; Timmy Trumpet; Kshmr	3:43
11.	"Warrior" (with Dirtcaps featuring Jo Mersa)	Carnage; Dirtcaps	2:46
12.	"Can You Feel It" (with Atmozfears featuring Ty Dolla Sign)	Carnage; Atmozfears	3:40
13.	"November Skies" (featuring Tomas Barfod and Nina K)	Carnage; Tomas Barfod	4:44
14.	"Back That"	Carnage	3:00
15.	"Take Me"	Carnage; Chris P	2:46
Total length:			53:58

== Charts ==
Chart (2015)	Peak position
US Billboard 200	184
US Top Dance/Electronic Albums (Billboard)	1
US Independent Albums (Billboard)	15
