= Road Trips =

2026 song by Drake

Song by Drake

from the album Maid of Honour
- Released: May 15, 2026
- Genre: Hip hop; R&B; dance-pop; house; techno
- Length: 4:03
- Label: OVO Sound; Republic Records
- Songwriters: Aubrey Graham; Jasper Helderman; Cedric Hill; Elkan; Diamanté Blackmon; Kid Masterpiece; ZECCA
- Producers: Gordo; ZECCA; Elkan; Alvaro; Kid Masterpiece

Audio video
- "Road Trips" on YouTube

"Road Trips" is a song by Canadian rapper Drake, released on May 15, 2026, as the second track on his tenth studio album Maid of Honour. The song includes a sample of "Swangin' and Bangin'" by Houston rapper E.S.G.. It was produced by Gordo, ZECCA, Alvaro, Kid Masterpiece, and Elkan. The song was released through OVO Sound under exclusive license to Republic Records.

== Background ==
"Road Trips" was released as the second track on Maid of Honour, one of three albums Drake dropped simultaneously on May 15, 2026, alongside Iceman and Habibti. The track was co-produced by Gordo (formerly known as (DJ) Carnage), who has collaborated with Drake on his house, techno, and electronic Latin output since Honestly, Nevermind (2022). The song opens with a sample of E.S.G.'s "Swangin' and Bangin'".

== Composition ==
"Road Trips" runs 4 minutes and 3 seconds. The track features several beat switches; Mixtape Madness best describes the track as, "Drake’s signature swathing pads melt away for an abrasive techno riff to enter. We then hear some deep house sounds that really accentuate his autotuned crooning."

== Critical reception ==
Billboard ranked "Road Trips" the album's best track, highlighting Drake's high notes in the second half, and its bridge, calling it "just a home run." In a separate piece, Billboard spoke with Gordo about the track, with Gordo describing Drake as being in an "I don't give a f–k what anyone thinks" era. Mixtape Madness praised the track's beat switches, writing for Rolling Out, Eddy "Precise" Lamarre described it as giving the album "an immediate sense of motion."

== Charts ==
Chart performance for "Road Trips"
Chart (2026)	Peak position
Australia Hip-Hop/R&B (ARIA)	27
Canada Hot 100 (Billboard)	28
Global 200 (Billboard)	58
Greece International (IFPI)	95
South Africa Streaming (TOSAC)	40
US Billboard Hot 100	42

== Credits and personnel ==
Credits adapted from producer interviews.

- Drake – lead vocals, songwriter
- E.S.G. (Cedric Hill) – sampled artist, original songwriter ("Swangin' and Bangin'")
- Gordo (Diamanté Blackmon) – producer, songwriter
- Alvaro (Jasper Helderman) – producer, songwriter
- ZECCA – producer, songwriter
- Kid Masterpiece – producer, songwriter
- Elkan – producer, songwriter
