= Massive (song) =

2022 single by Drake

Single by Drake

from the album Honestly, Nevermind
- A-side: "Sticky"
- Released: June 21, 2022
- Genre: House
- Length: 5:36
- Label: OVO; Republic
- Songwriters: Aubrey Graham; Tresor Riziki; Diamanté Blackmon; Johannes Klahr; Richard Zastenker
- Producers: Gordo; Klahr (massive); Zastenker

Drake singles chronology
"Wait for U" (2022)	"Massive" / "Sticky" (2022)	"Staying Alive" (2022)

"Massive" is a house song by Canadian rapper Drake. It was sent to contemporary hit radio through Republic Records and OVO Sound as the dual lead single from his seventh studio album, Honestly, Nevermind, on June 21, 2022, alongside the single "Sticky". Drake wrote the song with singer Tresor and with producers Gordo, Johannes Klahr, and Richard Zastenker.

== Composition and lyrics ==
"Massive" was praised by Rolling Stone who said it could "easily fit on a DJ mix". The song includes samples and a piano-based instrumental line.

== Critical reception ==
HipHopDX said "Massive" was the album's "clearest radio smash". Evening Standard said the song is "the cheesiest moment" on the album. Variety noted the song's funeral theme and "concluded that the song’s mood casts it as a wry aside, rather than, well, sociopathic".

== Charts ==
=== Weekly charts ===
Weekly chart performance for "Massive"
Chart (2022)	Peak position
Australia (ARIA)	12
Austria (Ö3 Austria Top 40)	44
Canada Hot 100 (Billboard)	8
Canada CHR/Top 40 (Billboard)	16
Canada Hot AC (Billboard)	50
France (SNEP)	102
Germany (GfK)	53
Global 200 (Billboard)	10
Greece International (IFPI)	7
Iceland (Tónlistinn)	10
Ireland (IRMA)	7
Italy (FIMI)	90
Lebanon (OLT20)	11
Lithuania (AGATA)	27
Luxembourg (Billboard)	14
Netherlands (Single Top 100)	25
New Zealand (Recorded Music NZ)	15
Portugal (AFP)	19
South Africa Streaming (TOSAC)	5
Sweden (Sverigetopplistan)	73
Switzerland (Schweizer Hitparade)	7
UK Singles (Official Charts)	8
UK Dance (Official Charts)	2
US Billboard Hot 100	14
US Hot Dance/Electronic Songs (Billboard)	3
US Pop Airplay (Billboard)	22

=== Year-end charts ===
2022 year-end chart performance for "Massive"
Chart (2022)	Position
Canada (Canadian Hot 100)	56
US Hot Dance/Electronic Songs (Billboard)	11

== Certifications ==
Certifications for "Massive"
Region	Certification	Certified units/sales
Australia (ARIA)	Platinum	70,000^{‡}
France (SNEP)	Gold	100,000^{‡}
Italy (FIMI)	Gold	50,000^{‡}
New Zealand (RMNZ)	Platinum	30,000^{‡}
United Kingdom (BPI)	Platinum	600,000^{‡}
^{‡} Sales+streaming figures based on certification alone.

== Release history ==
Release history for "Massive"
Region	Date	Format	Label	Ref.
United States	June 21, 2022	Contemporary hit radio	Republic; OVO	
