= Young Martha =

EP by Young Thug, Carnage and Young Stoner Life
- Released: September 22, 2017
- Recorded: 2016–17
- Genres: Hip hop; trap
- Length: 15:44
- Labels: YSL; 300; Atlantic; Heavyweight
- Producers: Carnage; Felix Snow; Nic Nac; OG Parker; Senojnayr; Wheezy

Young Thug chronology
Beautiful Thugger Girls (2017)	Young Martha (2017)	Super Slimey (2017)

Carnage chronology
Papi Gordo (2015)	Young Martha (2017)	Battered Bruised & Bloody (2018)

Singles from Young Martha
- 1. "Homie" Released: September 8, 2017; 2. "Liger" Released: September 21, 2017

Young Martha is a collaborative extended play by American rapper Young Thug, producer Carnage and Young Stoner Life. The EP was released on September 22, 2017, by YSL, 300 Entertainment, Atlantic Records and Heavyweight Records. Young Martha includes four tracks and guest appearances from Meek Mill and Shakka. It was produced by Carnage alongside OG Parker, Felix Snow, Wheezy, Nic Nac and Senojnayr.

== Background ==
The collaborative EP was initially announced by Carnage in December 2016. The final track of the project, "Don't Call Me", premiered in July 2016, and was expected to be included on Carnage's sophomore album.

== Singles ==
The lead single, "Homie" featuring Meek Mill, was released on September 8, 2017, for streaming and digital download. It was accompanied by a music video which premiered on Young Thug's YouTube. The second single, "Liger", was revealed a day before the EP's release on September 21, 2017.

== Track listing ==
Credits adapted from BMI.

Young Martha track listing
No.	Title	Writer(s)	Producer(s)	Length
1.	"Homie" (featuring Meek Mill)	Jeffery Williams; Diamanté Blackmon; Robert Williams; Chauncey Hollis; Ryan Jones	Carnage; Senojnayr	3:38
2.	"Liger"	Williams; Blackmon; Joshua Parker	Carnage; OG Parker	3:28
3.	"10,000 Slimes"	Williams; Blackmon; Wesley Glass	Carnage; Wheezy	4:42
4.	"Don't Call Me" (featuring Shakka)	Williams; Blackmon; Shakka Philip; William van der Heyden; Nicholas Balding	Carnage; Felix Snow; Nic Nac^{[a]}	3:56
Total length:				15:44

Notes

- ^{^[a]} signifies a co-producer
