= I Shyne =

Single by Carnage and Lil Pump

from the album Battered Bruised & Bloody
- Released: January 18, 2018
- Recorded: 2018
- Genre: Hip-hop; trap
- Length: 2:33
- Label: Heavyweight Records
- Songwriters: Gazzy Garcia; Diamanté Blackmon
- Producer: Carnage

Carnage singles chronology
"Learn How to Watch" (2018)	"I Shyne" (2018)	"Plur Genocide" (2018)

Lil Pump singles chronology
"Designer" (2017)	"I Shyne" (2018)	"Esskeetit" (2018)

Alternative cover

"I Shyne" (stylized as "i SHYNE") is a song recorded by Guatemalan-American DJ Carnage and American rapper Lil Pump. It was released on January 18, 2018, by Heavyweight Records as the second single from Carnage's second studio album Battered Bruised & Bloody. The song was produced by Carnage.

== Background ==
On January 18, 2018, Carnage announced the song and its release date. In an interview with XXL, he stated that while working with Lil Pump, the song came together almost effortlessly. He stated, "I made the beat in about five minutes and immediately sent it to Lil Pump. He laced the track in less than 48 hours and the rest was history." The title is influenced by the episode names of iCarly, and the design is influenced by the title of the show.

== Critical reception ==
Billboard's Kat Bein said Lil Pump "is a savage all over the beat. He really has some kind of superhuman ability to shout forever," while HotNewHipHop's Aron A. stated, "It's a perfect match of a producer who creates nothing but high energy pieces of work and a young rapper that carries the same energy on his day to day life."

== Charts ==
Chart (2018)	Peak position
Canada Hot 100 (Billboard)	95
US Bubbling Under Hot 100 (Billboard)	14
US Hot R&B/Hip-Hop Songs (Billboard)	49
