= Sticky (Drake song) =

2022 single by Drake

Single by Drake

from the album Honestly, Nevermind
- B-side: "Massive"
- Released: June 21, 2022
- Genre: Hip hop; Baltimore club
- Length: 4:03
- Label: OVO; Republic
- Songwriters: Aubrey Graham; Diamanté Blackmon; Ry Cuming
- Producer: Gordo

Drake singles chronology
"Wait for U" (2022)	"Massive" / "Sticky" (2022)	"Staying Alive" (2022)

Music video
- "Sticky" Video on YouTube

"Sticky" is a song by Canadian rapper Drake. It was sent to rhythmic contemporary radio through Republic Records and OVO Sound as the dual lead single from his seventh studio album, Honestly, Nevermind, on June 21, 2022, alongside the single "Massive", which was sent to contemporary hit radio on the same day. Drake wrote the song with producer Gordo and additional producer Ry X. It is one of the two rap songs on the album, along with "Jimmy Cooks"–the rest of the album is mostly deep house. It is also one of two songs on the album with a Baltimore Club sound.

== Critical reception ==
AllMusic reviewer Tim Sendra saw "Sticky" as "the most fun" track on Honestly, Nevermind, describing the song as "pumping [and] Baltimore-influenced". Rolling Stone said that the song was in Drake's familiar rap style, on top of "a deep and thumping beat".

== Charts ==
=== Weekly charts ===
Weekly chart performance for "Sticky"
Chart (2022)	Peak position
Australia (ARIA)	15
Canada Hot 100 (Billboard)	3
France (SNEP)	111
Global 200 (Billboard)	8
Greece International (IFPI)	18
Iceland (Tónlistinn)	12
Ireland (IRMA)	27
Lithuania (AGATA)	61
Luxembourg (Billboard)	23
Netherlands (Single Top 100)	87
New Zealand (Recorded Music NZ)	10
Portugal (AFP)	22
South Africa Streaming (TOSAC)	2
Sweden (Sverigetopplistan)	60
Switzerland (Schweizer Hitparade)	59
UK Singles (OCC)	30
UK Dance (OCC)	10
US Billboard Hot 100	6
US Hot R&B/Hip-Hop Songs (Billboard)	5
US Rhythmic Airplay (Billboard)	4

=== Year-end charts ===
2022 year-end chart performance for "Sticky"
Chart (2022)	Position
Canada (Canadian Hot 100)	69
US Hot R&B/Hip-Hop Songs (Billboard)	26
US Rhythmic (Billboard)	39

== Certifications ==
Certifications for "Sticky"
Region	Certification	Certified units/sales
Australia (ARIA)	Platinum	70,000^{‡}
Canada (Music Canada)	2× Platinum	160,000^{‡}
New Zealand (RMNZ)	Gold	15,000^{‡}
United Kingdom (BPI)	Silver	200,000^{‡}
United States (RIAA)	Platinum	1,000,000^{‡}
^{‡} Sales+streaming figures based on certification alone.

== Release history ==
Release history for "Sticky"
Region	Date	Format	Label	Ref.
United States	June 21, 2022	Rhythmic contemporary radio	Republic; OVO	
