= Cheetah Print =

2026 song by Drake featuring Sexyy Red

Song by Drake featuring Sexyy Red

from the album Maid of Honour
- Released: May 15, 2026
- Length: 3:22
- Label: OVO; Republic
- Songwriters: Aubrey Drake Graham; Janae Nierah Wherry; SkipOnDaBeat; Samuel David Jimenez; Digital Jet; Sean Turk; William Perry Jr.
- Producers: SkipOnDaBeat; Smash David; Sean Turk; Digital Jet

Audio video
- "Cheetah Print" on YouTube

"Cheetah Print" is a song by Canadian rapper Drake featuring American rapper Sexyy Red from his studio album Maid of Honour (2026), through OVO Sound and Republic Records, as the album's fourth track. The song was written and produced by SkipOnDaBeat, Smash David, Sean Turk, and Digital Jet, among others.

== Composition ==
"Cheetah Print" is a club-oriented track that shifts midway through the song, at which point Sexyy Red takes over. The song features Sexyy Red interpolating "Cha Cha Slide" by DJ Casper, as well as a sample from Peggy Gou's "(It Goes Like) Nanana".

== Reception ==
The song received generally negative reviews from critics. Walden Green of Pitchfork awarded it a "Best New Track" designation, describing it as "the clubby party-starter of the three albums he dropped last night" and calling it "a really good-ass time." Green compared it to "Nice for What", characterizing the song as an example of Drake's "trick" of responding to controversy by making people dance rather than addressing criticism directly.

== Charts ==
Chart performance for "Cheetah Print"
Chart (2026)	Peak position
Canada Hot 100 (Billboard)	31
US Billboard Hot 100	41
