= DJ Ramon Sucesso =

Brazilian music producer and DJ (born 2002)

- Born: Ramon Alves da Silva; 2002 (age 23–24)
- Origin: Belford Roxo, Rio de Janeiro, Brazil
- Genres: Funk carioca
- Occupations: DJ; producer
- Years active: 2019–present
- Label: Lugar Alto

Ramon Alves da Silva (born 2002), known professionally as DJ Ramon Sucesso, is a Brazilian DJ and producer from Belford Roxo, Rio de Janeiro. Emerging from the Baixada Fluminense funk scene, he gained recognition in 2020 through viral bedroom DJ performances shared online, which his followers dubbed as "Sexta dos Crias" (lit. 'Homie Fridays'). His mixing style is characterized by rapid sample manipulation, dense layering of vocal fragments and digital effects, and techniques derived from turntablism and DJ controller performance.

In 2023, Silva released his debut album Sexta dos Crias through Lugar Alto. The album consists of continuous DJ mixes drawing on baile funk traditions while incorporating experimental production techniques, and received positive reviews from music critics. He subsequently toured Europe, performed at Primavera Sound's Boiler Room stage in Barcelona, and released the collaborative single "Pressure Funk" (2024) with Florentino and Shygirl. His second album Sexta dos Crias 2.0 was released in 2026 to further positive critical reception.

== Early life ==
Ramon Alves da Silva was born in 2002 in Belford Roxo, a municipality in the Baixada Fluminense region of Rio de Janeiro. He was raised in the Palhada neighborhood of Nova Iguaçu. His parents are evangelical Christians, and he grew up with a brother named Ruan. In his childhood, Silva trained at a local sports school with the intention of becoming a professional football player. He eventually stopped this training, stating he did not see enough opportunity in the sport. He left school before completion, later stating he felt suited for a different career.

== Musical career ==
=== 2018–2022: Career beginnings ===
Prior to pursuing music, Silva worked at a car wash and served as an assistant for local political campaigns. He developed an interest in Brazilian funk through the music he heard while working at the car wash. In 2018, Silva and Ruan created a YouTube channel titled "Irmãos Sucessada" (lit. 'Successful Brothers') to share music from other artists. The name was a tribute to "Somália Sucessada" (lit. 'Successful Somalia'), a popular channel in the funk scene. The channel faced multiple deactivations due to copyright issues. After his brother ceased his involvement, Silva continued the project alone and changed his stage name to DJ Ramon Sucesso.

Silva began mixing music at the age of 16, teaching himself to use the digital audio workstation Virtual DJ software on a laptop he purchased for R$300. In 2019, his father provided the money for him to purchase his first DJ controller, a Pioneer DDJ-400. While Silva taught himself mixing techniques, he received instruction in music production from DJ Denilson O Clínico. In 2020, Silva gained significant visibility through viral videos of his bedroom performances in Nova Iguaçu. These videos featured a distinct visual style where the recording phone was placed directly on a speaker, causing the camera to shake in synchronization with the bass. His followers coined the name "Sexta dos Crias" (lit. 'Homie Fridays') for these weekly posts. In July 2023, Silva worked with MC Torugo to release the collaborative EP Contenção, which features trap and funk influences. By 2022, Silva had transitioned from his Pioneer DDJ-400 to a more robust XDJ-RR controller, which better supported his high-velocity mixing style.

=== 2023–2025: Sexta dos Crias ===
In November 2023, he launched his first full-length album titled Sexta dos Crias via the label Lugar Alto, with international distribution handled by Honest Jon's. It consists of two continuous 15-minute tracks: "Sexta dos Crias" and "Distorcendo a Realidade" (lit. 'Distorting Reality'). The album is characterized by rapid sample manipulation, and dense layering of vocal fragments and digital effects, and frequent variation in pitch and tempo, with "Distorcendo a Realidade" reaching tempos of approximately 150 beats per minute (BPM). Its sound incorporates elements associated with baile funk, including the "beat bolha" (lit. 'bubble beat') style, alongside techniques derived from turntablism and DJ controller-based performance.

The album was met with generally positive reviews from critics, with a 4/5 star rating from Aquele Tuim, with Matheus José framing Sexta dos Crias as consolidating stylistic elements Silva had previously developed in his online mixes, and situated his work in relation to experimental approaches within both Rio de Janeiro and São Paulo funk scenes. Nadine Smith of Pitchfork gave the album a rating of 7.7/10, praising its "impish, wildly unpredictable" nature. Resident Advisor's Felipe Maia said that the release functions less as a presentation of discrete compositions than as a document of his DJ technique. It was released on vinyl in November 2023, with reported demand including orders from Europe, according to Silva.

Silva expanded his career internationally in 2024 with a European tour that included performances in London, Paris, and Lisbon. A notable appearance during this tour was his set for the Boiler Room at the Primavera Sound festival in Barcelona on 30 May 2024. That same year, he released the EP inHouse: DJ Ramon Sucesso and the collaborative track "Pressure Funk" with Florentino and Shygirl. In June 2024, he performed in Brasília at the "Baile Loco" event upon returning from Europe. He also performed at a wedding in Rio de Janeiro for a fan who traveled from New York specifically to hire him.

=== 2026–present: Sexta dos Crias 2.0 ===
On 16 January 2026, Silva released his second full-length album, Sexta dos Crias 2.0, through the label Lugar Alto. DJ Ramemes contributed to the production. The project follows the format of his debut, consisting of two continuous side-length mixes of approximately 17 minutes each: "Rompendo o Espaço-Tempo" (lit. 'Breaking Through Space-Time') and "Distorcendo o Universo" (lit. 'Distorting the Universe'). The album was also issued on vinyl for European distribution. "Rompendo o Espaço-Tempo" emphasizes layered rhythms and repetition, while "Distorcendo o Universo" focuses on vocal manipulation and melodic fragments, incorporating elements associated with earlier funk styles alongside more recent material. The sound of the album has been described as "post-funk" and retains features of Silva's established sound, including the "beat bolha" style, while introducing additional rhythmic influences and a more restrained use of vocal interjections.

Sexta dos Crias 2.0 received coverage from international and Brazilian publications. Pitchfork and Música Instantânea both gave the album a score of 8.0 and Pop Fantasma gave it a 10 out of 10 rating. At the time of its release, the album reached number one on the Rate Your Music chart for 2026, based on user ratings. On 11 May 2026, Silva was announced as one of the performers for Primavera Sound São Paulo 2026, held on 5–6 December at the Interlagos Circuit in São Paulo.

== Discography ==
=== Studio albums ===
- Sexta dos Crias (2023)
- Sexta dos Crias 2.0 (2026)

=== Extended plays ===
- Contenção (2023)
- inHouse: DJ Ramon Sucesso (2024)
