= Where's Your Stuff =

Interlude by Drake

from the album Maid of Honour
- Released: May 15, 2026
- Length: 0:52
- Label: OVO; Republic
- Songwriters: Aubrey Drake Graham; Bradley Baker
- Producer: B4U

Audio video
- "Where's Your Stuff" on YouTube

"Where's Your Stuff" is a 52-second interlude by Canadian rapper Drake, released May 15, 2026, as a track on his album Maid of Honour.

== Composition ==
The interlude is built around a harp backing track and is voiced by a woman demanding luxuries "beyond that of normal means." Medium's Josh Herring interpreted the piece as sarcastic commentary on Drake's habit of surrounding himself with, and pursuing, women he perceives in this way, tying it thematically to the album track "New Bestie." Herring described the interlude as bisecting the album's tracklist, marking a transition point in the sequencing.

== Reception ==
Billboard's Armon Sadler ranked "Where's Your Stuff Interlude" last among the 14 tracks on Maid of Honour, writing that "there really isn't much to say about this interlude," and noting that its harp backing "sound[s] really nice" but that, structured as a skit rather than a full song, it stood out little next to the album's other 13 tracks. In a feature reimagining Drake's three simultaneous 2026 albums as a single, pared-down 24-track record, The Fader retained "Where's Your Stuff Interlude," placing it third in its proposed sequencing.

== Commercial performance ==
Despite the rest of Maid of Honour, Iceman, and Habibti combining for a then-record 42 songs charting simultaneously on the Billboard Hot 100, "Where's Your Stuff Interlude" was the sole track from the 43-song triple release that did not chart, a fact Stereogum attributed to its brief, 52-second runtime. Though, Complex noted that the track was found to be "ineligible [for Billboard charts] due to its short length".

== Credits and personnel ==
Attributed by several sources.

- Youfoundivyy (Note: youfoundivyy is an individual on TikTok; their video, posted four months prior to the release of the song, was the only vocals in the track, making her the sole vocalist) – vocals (sampled)
- Drake – songwriter
- Bradley Baker – songwriter
- B4U – producer
