= Battered Bruised & Bloody =

Studio album by Carnage
- Released: April 13, 2018
- Recorded: 2017–18
- Genres: Trap; hip hop
- Length: 38:41
- Labels: Heavyweight Records, BMG
- Producers: Carnage (also exec.); Deko; Cashmere Cat; OG Parker; Skellism; Steve Aoki; Vlado; VXNYL; Yen Dough

Carnage chronology
Young Martha (2017)	Battered Bruised & Bloody (2018)

Singles from Battered Bruised & Bloody
- 1. "Learn How to Watch" Released: January 12, 2018; 2. "I Shyne" Released: January 18, 2018; 3. "Plur Genocide" Released: February 23, 2018

Battered Bruised & Bloody is the second studio album by American DJ and record producer Carnage. It was released on April 13, 2018 through Heavyweight Records. The album features guest appearances by Migos, Lil Pump, Mac Miller, Kyle, among others.

== Singles ==
The first single, "Learn How to Watch" featuring Mac Miller and MadeinTYO, was released on January 12, 2018. The official music video was uploaded on Cole Bennett's YouTube channel the next day.

The second single, "I Shyne" featuring Lil Pump, was released on January 18, 2018. The official lyric video was uploaded on Carnage's official YouTube channel on January 29, 2018.

The third single, "Plur Genocide" featuring Steve Aoki and Lockdown, was released on February 23, 2018. The official music video was also uploaded on Carnage's YouTube channel the same day.

== Track listing ==
- All tracks are produced by Carnage, except where noted.

No.	Title	Writer(s)	Producer(s)	Length
1.	"Headlock" (featuring Killy)	Diamanté Blackmon; Khalil Tatem		2:05
2.	"Block You" (with Deko)	Blackmon; Grant Decouto	Carnage; Deko	2:58
3.	"Learn How to Watch" (featuring Mac Miller and MadeinTYO)	Blackmon; Malcolm McCormick; Malcolm Davis		2:01
4.	"I Shyne" (with Lil Pump)	Blackmon; Gazzy Garcia		2:33
5.	"Motorola" (featuring Lil B)	Blackmon; Brandon McCartney		3:17
6.	"Up NXW" (featuring Scarlxrd)	Blackmon; Marius Listhrop; Magnus Hoiberg	Carnage; Cashmere Cat	1:54
7.	"Morokomba!" (with Skellism)	Blackmon; Sergio Garcia; Francisco Romo	Carnage; Skellism	3:25
8.	"Plur Genocide" (with Steve Aoki featuring Lockdown)	Blackmon; Steven Aoki	Carnage; Steve Aoki; Lockdown	2:42
9.	"Visa" (featuring Young Troy)	Blackmon; Chad Gurman; Yen Dough; John Hyszko	VXNYL; Carnage; Yen Dough	4:05
10.	"Close to Me" (featuring Reo Cragun)	Blackmon; Reo Cragun; Onassis Morris	Vlado; Carnage	2:55
11.	"Overtime" (featuring Sebastian Reynoso and Kyle)	Blackmon; Sebastian Reynoso; Kyle Harvey		3:07
12.	"Bed Bugs" (featuring Nessly, Yung Pinch, and Takeoff)	Blackmon; Blake Sandoval; Maclean Porter; Kirsnik Ball		4:00
13.	"Waterworld" (featuring Migos)	Blackmon; Quavious Marshall; Kiari Cephus; Ball; Joshua Parker	Carnage; OG Parker	3:39
Total length:				38:41
