= Big Beautiful Woman =

Positive term for overweight women

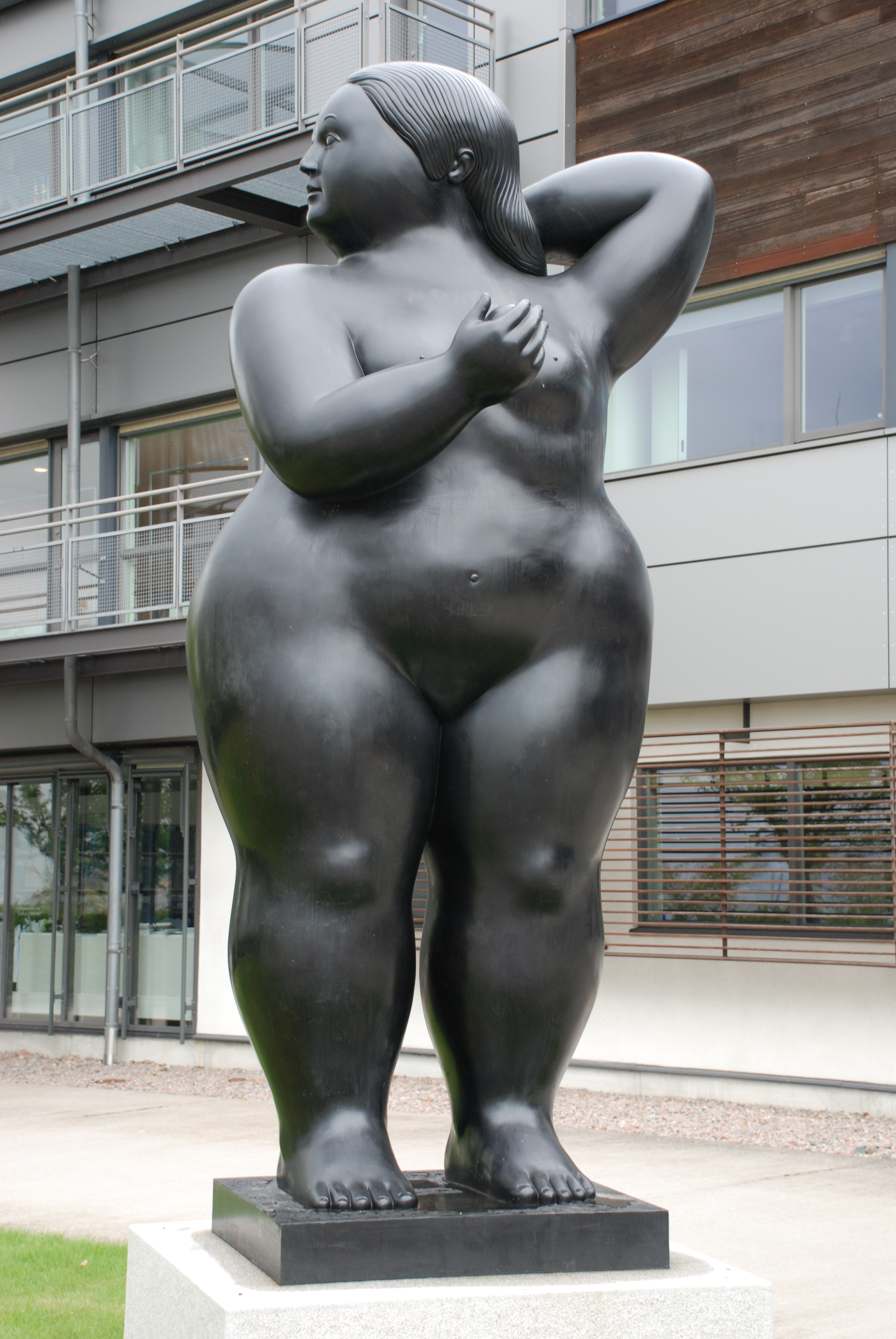
Sculpture by Fernando Botero

"Big Beautiful Woman" (BBW) is a positive (non-pejorative) term for an overweight woman.

== Meaning and usage ==
The terms "Big Beautiful Women" and "BBW" were coined by Carole Shaw in 1979, when she launched BBW Magazine, a fashion and lifestyle magazine for "plus-size" women. BBW Magazine trademarked the term "Big Beautiful Woman", which was later transferred to Dimensions Magazine. The term was also the name of Drake's 2026 song, BBW.

The term is also commonly used as a positive euphemism by those involved with the fat acceptance movement.

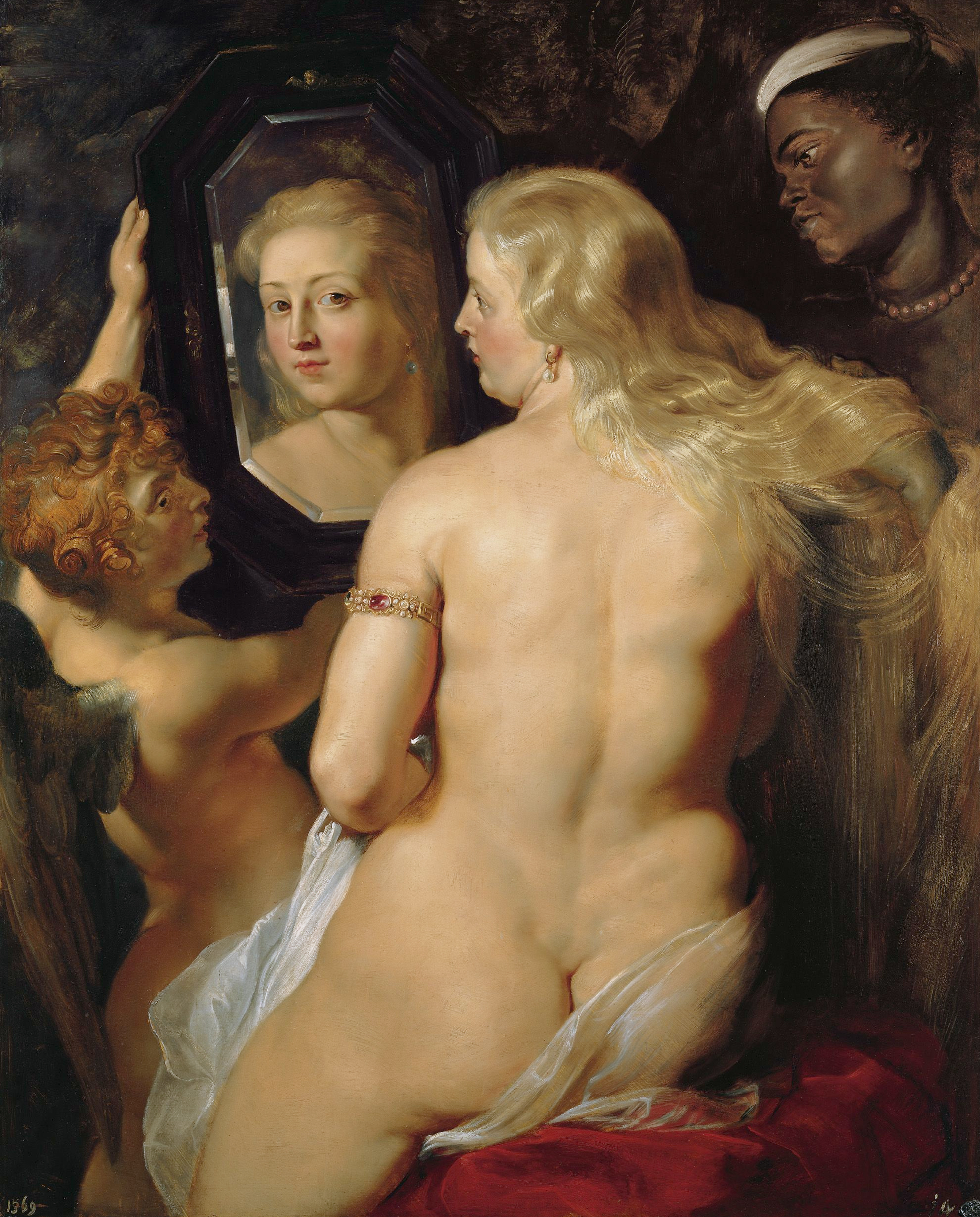
Rubens's "Venus at the Mirror"

The term has several near-synonyms with varying shades of meaning, such as "full-figured", "voluptuous", "zaftig", and "Rubenesque", the latter term referring to the art of Peter Paul Rubens, known for portraying full-bodied women.

== Variants ==
The acronym BBBW stands for Big Beautiful Black Woman. Another variant is SSBBW, which stands for Supersized Big Beautiful Woman. There is no formal definition which explains the exact difference between BBW and SSBBW. Some BBWs or SSBBWs consider themselves to be feedees. Dimensions Magazine considers a woman over 350 pounds (160 kg) to be an SSBBW.

USSBBW may also be used, for "ultra supersized big beautiful woman". Again, there is no formal definition, however BBWWiki suggests women over 600 pounds (270 kg) to be considered USSBBWs, but acknowledges that "opinions vary."

== See also ==
- Fat acceptance movement
- Fat fetishism
- Female body shape
- Venus figurine
- Bear (gay culture)
- Obesity
