= Denise Belfon =

- Also known as: Saucy Wow
- Born: Denise Ann Sinoda Belfon; 1968 or 1969 (age 57–58)
- Origin: Trinidad
- Genre: Soca
- Occupation: Singer songwriter
- Years active: 1991–present

Denise Belfon (born 1968 or 1969), also known as Saucy Wow, is a soca and R&B singer, songwriter and dancer from Trinidad.

== Singing career ==
In 1990, Belfon was discovered by bandleader Roy Cape. She started singing professionally with the soca band Black Sheep, before moving on to Sound Revolution. Her first solo recording was the soca single "Ka Ka Lay Lay". Belfon is also known under the nickname "Saucy Wow". She went on to record the singles "Hard Wuk", "De Jammette", "Saucy Baby", "Indian Man", and "Work" (1999). "Work" was sampled in 2000 by New York house music duo Masters at Work, reaching number 7 on the Billboard Dance Club Songs chart in 2002, and has since been sampled in at least 20 more songs.

In 2022 a sample from "Work" was featured on the track "Lick" by Megan Thee Stallion and Shenseea, which peaked at number 20 on the Bubbling Under Hot 100 chart. Artist Drake sampled Belfon's vocals on the 2026 track "BBW". According to Belfon, Drake aided her to receive royalties for "Work" for the first time in 28 years. Also in 2026, a version of "Work" credited to Belfon, James Hype, and Pupa Nas T, charted on the UK Singles Sales Chart.

In the music press Belfon has been called both a "legend" and an "icon" of the Soca music scene. She is also known for expressing her sexuality in her music and dancing, which has resulted in her becoming a positive role model for women particularly in her home country of Trinidad.
