= Honestly, Nevermind =

Studio album by Drake
- Released: June 17, 2022
- Studios: The Chapel (Toronto); Villa by the Water (Turks & Caicos)
- Genres: Dance; house
- Length: 52:32
- Labels: OVO; Republic
- Producers: &Me; 40; Alex Lustig; Beau Nox; Black Coffee; Gordo; Govi; Ginton; Johannes Klahr; Kid Masterpiece; Michael Malih; Nyan; Rampa; Richard Zastenker; Sona; Tay Keith; Tizzle; Vinylz; Vlado; Wondra030

Drake chronology
| Certified Lover Boy (2021) | Honestly, Nevermind (2022) | Her Loss (2022) |

Singles from Honestly, Nevermind
- 1. "Sticky" / "Massive" Released: June 21, 2022; 2. "Jimmy Cooks" Released: October 11, 2022

Honestly, Nevermind is the seventh studio album by Canadian rapper and singer Drake, which was surprise-released on June 17, 2022, through OVO Sound and Republic Records. The album includes a sole guest feature from 21 Savage, and production from a variety of producers, including Gordo, &Me, Rampa, and Black Coffee, who served as one of its executive producers. It is the second installment of what Drake described as a "trilogy of albums", following Certified Lover Boy (2021) and preceding Her Loss (2022).

A stylistic departure from Drake's previous releases, Honestly, Nevermind adopts a dance, house and Baltimore club sound. The album received generally positive reviews and debuted atop the US Billboard 200 with 204,000 album-equivalent units, becoming Drake's eleventh US number-one album. The album's singles, "Sticky" and "Massive", debuted in the top 20 in the US Billboard Hot 100, while "Jimmy Cooks" became Drake's eleventh (and 21 Savage's second) US number-one song.

== Background and promotion ==
On March 4, 2021, Drake announced the launch of satellite radio channel Sound 42 on SiriusXM, with OVO Sound Radio as its flagship program, marking the show's return since it aired between July 2015 and October 2018 on streaming service Apple Music. Following the show's broadcast, he released his fourth extended play Scary Hours 2 at midnight. Drake also revealed that his sixth studio album Certified Lover Boy would be coming soon, which was eventually released on September 3.

On the afternoon of June 16, 2022, OVO Sound announced on Twitter that Drake would be premiering his own radio show Table For One on Sound 42 later that night at 11:00 PM EST. A few hours later, Drake made a surprise announcement on Instagram that he would be releasing his seventh studio album, Honestly, Nevermind, later that midnight. Broadcasting not long after Game Six of the 2022 NBA Finals earlier that night, Drake premiered the tracks "Confusion" and "I Could Never" on the show. Drake also revealed during the show that he was working on Scary Hours 3.

The album is dedicated to American fashion designer Virgil Abloh, who died in 2021. A music video for "Falling Back" was released alongside the album. Directed by Director X, the official music video sees Drake marrying 23 different women. Canadian-American professional basketball player Tristan Thompson makes an appearance as his best man.

The album's only feature, 21 Savage, appears on the closing track of the album, "Jimmy Cooks". The album's first two singles, "Sticky" and "Massive" were sent to rhythmic contemporary radio and contemporary hit radio, respectively, on June 21. "Jimmy Cooks" impacted contemporary hit radio on October 11, as the album's third single. On November 26, 2022, Drake revealed that the album is part of a trilogy of albums following Certified Lover Boy and later Her Loss.

== Composition ==
Honestly, Nevermind is a dance and house album driven by a Baltimore club influence. The album includes elements of Jersey club, hard techno, R&B, amapiano, ballroom, and Drake's traditional style of hip-hop.

== Critical reception ==
Honestly, Nevermind ratings
Aggregate scores
| Source | Rating |
|---|---|
| AnyDecentMusic? | 6.7/10 |
| Metacritic | 73/100 |
Review scores
| Source | Rating |
| AllMusic | 4/5 stars |
| Clash | 7/10 |
| Entertainment Weekly | B− |
| Evening Standard | 2/5 stars |
| Exclaim! | 7/10 |
| The Guardian | 3/5 stars |
| HipHopDX | 3.9/5 |
| NME | 3/5 stars |
| Pitchfork | 6.6/10 |
| Rolling Stone | 4/5 stars |

Honestly, Nevermind was met with generally positive reviews. At Metacritic, which assigns a normalized rating out of 100 to reviews from professional publications, the album received an average score of 73, based on 14 reviews, indicating "generally favorable reviews". Aggregator AnyDecentMusic? gave it 6.7 out of 10, based on their assessment of the critical consensus.

In a positive review, Robin Murray of Clash called Honestly, Nevermind a "puzzle that will take a long time to fully unlock" and "a devastating about-turn that will fascinate and frustrate in equal measure". Tim Sendra from AllMusic enjoyed the album, saying, "Honestly, Nevermind is a welcome development in the Drake saga, a left turn off what was starting to seem like an endless stretch of trap-heavy highway. The destination is still sad and self-involved, but at least the scenery is colorful and never boring". The New York Times's Jon Caramanica wrote, "A small marvel of bodily exuberance – appealingly weightless, escapist and zealously free. An album of entrancing club music, it's a pointed evolution toward a new era for one of music's most influential stars. It is also a Drake album made up almost wholly of the parts of Drake albums that send hip-hop purists into conniptions". Writing for Rolling Stone, Jeff Ihaza stated, "The album achieves something mischievously unguarded: a collection of blissful dance tunes constructed for embrace and abandon. Drake takes a leap further into uncharted realms than any of his peers, offering a refreshing sign of what's to come".

Vivian Medithi of HipHopDX said, "He stopped making the Drake album we want him to make and made the Drake album Drake wants to make. Locked in with producers he trusts and letting his guard down, he sounds more focused and balanced than he has in years". Variety critic Alex Swhear said, "As a standalone Drake album, it's deeply refreshing, and a dose of vibrant pop likely to reverberate through the remainder of the summer". Louis Pavlakos of Exclaim! said, "Hints of the album's atypicality are apparent from its opening minutes, for better or worse. "Falling Back" makes for a questionable lead-off, as Drake's falsetto has never been particularly strong, but Honestly, Nevermind rarely falters from there".

In a lukewarm review, Pitchfork's Alphonse Pierre wrote, "A breezy Drake dance album sounds great in concept, but the half-measure house beats and lackluster songwriting keep it from really popping off". In his review, Alexis Petridis of The Guardian states, "The Canadian superstar's new album is surprisingly full of house music, but his passive-aggressive complaints get dull". NME critic Kyann-Sian Williams said, "The Canadian's latest release surprises in many ways, ditching bland trap for house beats and some daring, if somewhat mixed, vocal takes". In a more negative review, David Smyth of Evening Standard opined that Honestly, Nevermind felt like "a minor work" within Drake's discography, going on to say that "[Drake] sounds like he isn't trying very hard".

=== Year-end lists ===
Select year-end rankings of Honestly, Nevermind
| Critic/Publication | List | Rank | Ref. |
|---|---|---|---|
| Billboard | The 50 Best Albums of 2022 | 27 | |
| Complex | The Best Albums of 2022 | 13 | |
| The New York Times | Jon Caramanica's Best Albums of 2022 | 3 | |
| Okayplayer | Okayplayer's 22 Best Albums of 2022 | 14 | |
| The Ringer | The 33 Best Albums of 2022 | 20 | |
| Rolling Stone | The 100 Best Albums of 2022 | 22 | |
| Slant Magazine | The 50 Best Albums of 2022 | 29 | |

=== Industry awards ===
Awards and nominations for Her Loss
| Year | Ceremony | Category | Result | Ref. |
|---|---|---|---|---|
| 2023 | Billboard Music Awards | Top Dance/Electronic Album | Nominated | |
| 2023 | Billboard Music Awards | Top R&B Album | Nominated | |

== In popular culture ==
The song "Texts Go Green" was used by Google in an Android advertisement to call on Apple Inc. to adopt Rich Communication Services (RCS), in reference to the song's premise of iPhone users being blocked on iMessage.

== Commercial performance ==
Honestly, Nevermind debuted at number one on the US Billboard 200 with 204,000 album-equivalent units, including 11,000 pure album sales. Its tracks earned a total of 250.23 million on-demand streams. The album is Drake's eleventh number-one album in the US. Honestly, Nevermind received the most first day streams of any dance album ever on Apple Music. In its second week, the album remained in the top ten as it fell to number three, earning 73,000 album-equivalent units. As of November 30, 2022, Honestly, Nevermind was the twenty-ninth best-selling album of the year according to Hits, moved a total 728,000 album-equivalent units, including 16,000 pure album sales, 60,000 song sales, 899 million audio-on-demand streams, and 41 million video-on-demand streams.

Honestly, Nevermind was the most-popular Dance/Electronic album in the United States in 2022 and topped Billboard Top Dance/Electronic Albums for 20 weeks. On August 13, 2023, the album was certified platinum by the Recording Industry Association of America (RIAA) for combined sales and album-equivalent units of over a one million units in the United States.

== Track listing ==
Honestly, Nevermind track listing
| No. | Title | Writer(s) | Producer(s) | Length |
|---|---|---|---|---|
| 1. | "Intro" | Aubrey Graham; Kaushik Barua | Kid Masterpiece | 0:36 |
| 2. | "Falling Back" | Graham; Tresor Riziki; André Boadu; Gregor Sütterlin; Alexander Lustig; Christian Astrop | &Me; Rampa; Alex Lustig^{[a]}; Beau Nox^{[a]} | 4:26 |
| 3. | "Texts Go Green" | Graham; Noel Cadastre; Nkosinathi Maphumulo; Esona Tyolo | Black Coffee; Sona | 5:08 |
| 4. | "Currents" | Graham; Maphumulo; Diamanté Blackmon; Noah Shebib; Donnell Prince; Jamal Glaze; Lawrence Edwards; Jonathan Smith; Craig Love; LaMarquis Jefferson | Black Coffee; Michael Malih; Gordo; 40^{[a]} | 2:37 |
| 5. | "A Keeper" | Graham; Boadu; Sütterlin; David Vogt; Philip Böllhoff; Sipho Silio; Hannes Büscher | &Me; Rampa; Wondra030 | 2:53 |
| 6. | "Calling My Name" | Graham; Blackmon; Johannes Klahr; Richard Zastenker; Lustig; Astrop; Dwayne Williams | Gordo; Klahr; Zastenker; Alex Lustig^{[a]}; Beau Nox^{[a]} | 2:09 |
| 7. | "Sticky" | Graham; Blackmon; Ry Cuming | Gordo; Ry X^{[a]} | 4:03 |
| 8. | "Massive" | Graham; Blackmon; Klahr; Zastenker; Riziki | Gordo; Klahr; Zastenker | 5:36 |
| 9. | "Flight's Booked" | Graham; Riziki; Barua; Lustig; Astrop; Nile Goveia; Marsha Ambrosius; Natalie Stewart; Zastenker; Vidal Davis | Kid Masterpiece; Alex Lustig; Beau Nox; Govi | 4:14 |
| 10. | "Overdrive" | Graham; Shebib; Maphumulo; Astrop; Lustig; James Bryan | 40; Black Coffee; Beau Nox^{[a]}; Lustig^{[a]} | 3:22 |
| 11. | "Down Hill" | Graham; Riziki; Shebib | 40 | 4:10 |
| 12. | "Tie That Binds" | Graham; Blackmon; Marcel Kosic; Ramon Ginton; Lustig; Astrop | Gordo; Vlado; Ginton; Lustig^{[a]}; Beau Nox^{[a]} | 5:36 |
| 13. | "Liability" | Graham; Nyan Lieberthal; Timothy Suby | Nyan; Tim Suby^{[c]}; Cadastre^{[a]} | 3:57 |
| 14. | "Jimmy Cooks" (featuring 21 Savage) | Graham; Shéyaa Bin Abraham-Joseph; Brytavious Chambers; Teslenko Alexandrovich; Anderson Hernandez; Kevin Gomringer; Tim Gomringer; Douglas Ford; Ibn Young; Harry Ray; Al Goodman; Walter Morris | Tay Keith; Tizzle; Vinylz; Cubeatz^{[a]} | 3:38 |
| Total length: | | | | 52:32 |

Notes

- ^{^[c]} signifies a co-producer
- ^{^[a]} signifies an additional producer

Sample credits

- "Currents" contains samples of "Some Cut", written by Jonathan Smith, Donnell Prince, Lawrence Edwards, Jamal Glaze, Craig Love, LaMarquis Jefferson, as performed by Trillville, and also contains an uncredited sample of "Shake it to the Ground", written by Charles Smith and Ryeisha Berrain, as performed by Blaqstarr and Rye Rye.
- "Calling My Name" contains samples of "Blow Ya Pussy Up", written by Dwayne Williams and performed by Tapp, and "Oye Ohene", written and performed by Obrafour.
- "Sticky" contains uncredited dialogue from Virgil Abloh's 2017 "Everything in Quotes" lecture at Columbia University's GSAPP.
- "Flight's Booked" contains samples of "Getting Late", written by Marsha Ambrosius, Natalie Stewart, and Vidal Davis, as performed by Floetry.
- "Jimmy Cooks" contains samples of "Just Awaken Shaken", written by Ibn Young, as performed by Playa Fly; and "You Were Gone", written by Al Goodman, Harry Ray, and Walter Morris, as performed by Brook Benton.

== Personnel ==
Credits adapted from official liner notes.

Musicians

- Drake – vocals
- Mukengerwa Tresor Riziki – additional vocals (track 4, 11, 12), background vocals (9)
- Wondra030 – piano (5)
- Alex Lustig – keyboards (6, 10)
- Beau Nox – guitar (6, 10), additional vocals (9) background vocals (10, 11)
- Emily Hemelberg – background vocals (10)
- Black Coffee – drums (10)
- James Bryan – guitar (10)
- 40 – keyboards (10)
- Nyan Lieberthal – drums, keyboards (13)
- Tim Suby – keyboards (13)
- Dougie F – background vocals (14)

Technical

- 40 – mixing (all tracks), engineering (4, 5, 8, 13)
- Luca Pretolesi – mixing
- Noel Cadastre – engineering (1–)
- Harley Arsenault – engineering (6)

== Charts ==
=== Weekly charts ===
Weekly chart performance
| Chart (2022) | Peak position |
|---|---|
| Australian Albums (ARIA) | 2 |
| Austrian Albums (Ö3 Austria) | 2 |
| Belgian Albums (Ultratop Flanders) | 4 |
| Belgian Albums (Ultratop Wallonia) | 2 |
| Canadian Albums (Billboard) | 1 |
| Czech Albums (ČNS IFPI) | 11 |
| Danish Albums (Hitlisten) | 2 |
| Dutch Albums (Album Top 100) | 1 |
| Finnish Albums (Suomen virallinen lista) | 3 |
| French Albums (SNEP) | 6 |
| German Albums (Offizielle Top 100) | 3 |
| Irish Albums (IRMA) | 2 |
| Italian Albums (FIMI) | 6 |
| Japanese Hot Albums (Billboard Japan) | 87 |
| Japanese Digital Albums (Oricon) | 24 |
| Lithuanian Albums (AGATA) | 3 |
| New Zealand Albums (RMNZ) | 1 |
| Norwegian Albums (VG-lista) | 2 |
| Slovak Albums (ČNS IFPI) | 16 |
| Spanish Albums (Promusicae) | 6 |
| Swedish Albums (Sverigetopplistan) | 2 |
| Swiss Albums (Schweizer Hitparade) | 1 |
| UK Albums (Official Charts) | 2 |
| UK Dance Albums (Official Charts) | 1 |
| US Billboard 200 | 1 |
| US Top Dance Albums (Billboard) | 1 |
| US Top R&B/Hip-Hop Albums (Billboard) | 1 |

=== Year-end charts ===
Year-end chart performance
| Chart (2022) | Position |
|---|---|
| Australian Albums (ARIA) | 80 |
| Belgian Albums (Ultratop Flanders) | 89 |
| Belgian Albums (Ultratop Wallonia) | 167 |
| Canadian Albums (Billboard) | 21 |
| Danish Albums (Hitlisten) | 59 |
| Dutch Albums (Album Top 100) | 41 |
| Icelandic Albums (Tónlistinn) | 20 |
| Lithuanian Albums (AGATA) | 37 |
| New Zealand Albums (RMNZ) | 49 |
| Swiss Albums (Schweizer Hitparade) | 61 |
| UK Albums (OCC) | 67 |
| US Billboard 200 | 46 |
| US Top Dance/Electronic Albums (Billboard) | 1 |
| US Top R&B/Hip-Hop Albums (Billboard) | 21 |

Year-end chart performance
| Chart (2023) | Position |
|---|---|
| Icelandic Albums (Tónlistinn) | 89 |
| US Billboard 200 | 103 |
| US Top Dance/Electronic Albums (Billboard) | 2 |
| US Top R&B/Hip-Hop Albums (Billboard) | 84 |

Year-end chart performance
| Chart (2024) | Position |
|---|---|
| US Top Dance/Electronic Albums (Billboard) | 4 |

Year-end chart performance
| Chart (2025) | Position |
|---|---|
| US Top Dance Albums (Billboard) | 9 |

== Certifications ==
Certifications
| Region | Certification | Certified units/sales |
|---|---|---|
| Canada (Music Canada) | 2× Platinum | 160,000^{‡} |
| Denmark (IFPI Danmark) | Gold | 10,000^{‡} |
| Italy (FIMI) | Gold | 25,000^{‡} |
| New Zealand (RMNZ) | Platinum | 15,000^{‡} |
| Poland (ZPAV) | Gold | 10,000^{‡} |
| United Kingdom (BPI) | Gold | 100,000^{‡} |
| United States (RIAA) | Platinum | 1,000,000^{‡} |
^{‡} Sales+streaming figures based on certification alone.

== Release history ==
Release dates and formats
| Region | Date | Label(s) | Format(s) | Ref. |
|---|---|---|---|---|
| Various | June 17, 2022 | OVO; Republic | Digital download; streaming | |
| Various | March 17, 2023 | OVO; Republic | CD | |
