= Rolling Out =

American lifestyle and entertainment magazine

- Founded: 1998; 28 years ago
- Based in: Atlanta, Georgia, U.S.
- Language: English
- Website: rollingout.com

Rolling Out is an African American-focused lifestyle and entertainment magazine based in Atlanta, Georgia. Published by Steed Media Group, it was founded in 1998 and has grown into a multimedia platform that covers culture, politics, entertainment, business, health, and social justice issues relevant to the Black community in the United States.

== History ==
Rolling Out was founded by American media executive, publisher, and entrepreneur Munson Steed, as a free weekly newspaper intended to provide media representation for African American audiences. Initially distributed in Atlanta. It expanded its reach to other urban markets and established a presence in digital media as well.

As of the 2020s, Rolling Out reported an estimated digital audience of over 2 million unique visitors monthly, and print distribution in over 20 U.S. cities. The magazine maintains a combined social media following of over 500,000.

Rolling Out is known for its celebrity interviews and editorial features on Black culture, activism, entrepreneurship, and entertainment. Public figures featured on its covers have included singer Normani Kordei, television personality Porsha Williams, singer H.E.R., actor Morris Chestnut, and former heavyweight boxing champion Mike Tyson.

In 2016, Rolling Out formed a partnership with digital news platform The Grio to create a digital advertising network aimed at multicultural audiences.

In 2017, Steed Media Group collaborated with ad tech firm Digital Remedy to launch Rolling Out Extend, a platform to expand its reach to over 30 million addressable digital consumers.

In 2021, Rolling Out participated in the #AmplifyBlackStories initiative in partnership with BlackBookStore.com and Penguin Random House. The campaign aimed to promote Black authors and literature to a broader audience.

In 2024, Rolling Out launched the RideCon AI Lab during its annual tech and culture conference. The lab featured sessions on artificial intelligence, entrepreneurship, and innovation in Black communities.

The publication has worked with national brands such as McDonald's, American Airlines, Lexus, and Ford for multicultural marketing campaigns.

== See also ==
- List of African-American newspapers and media outlets
- The Grio
- Ebony (magazine)
