= Gordo (DJ) =

American-Nicaraguan record producer (born 1991)

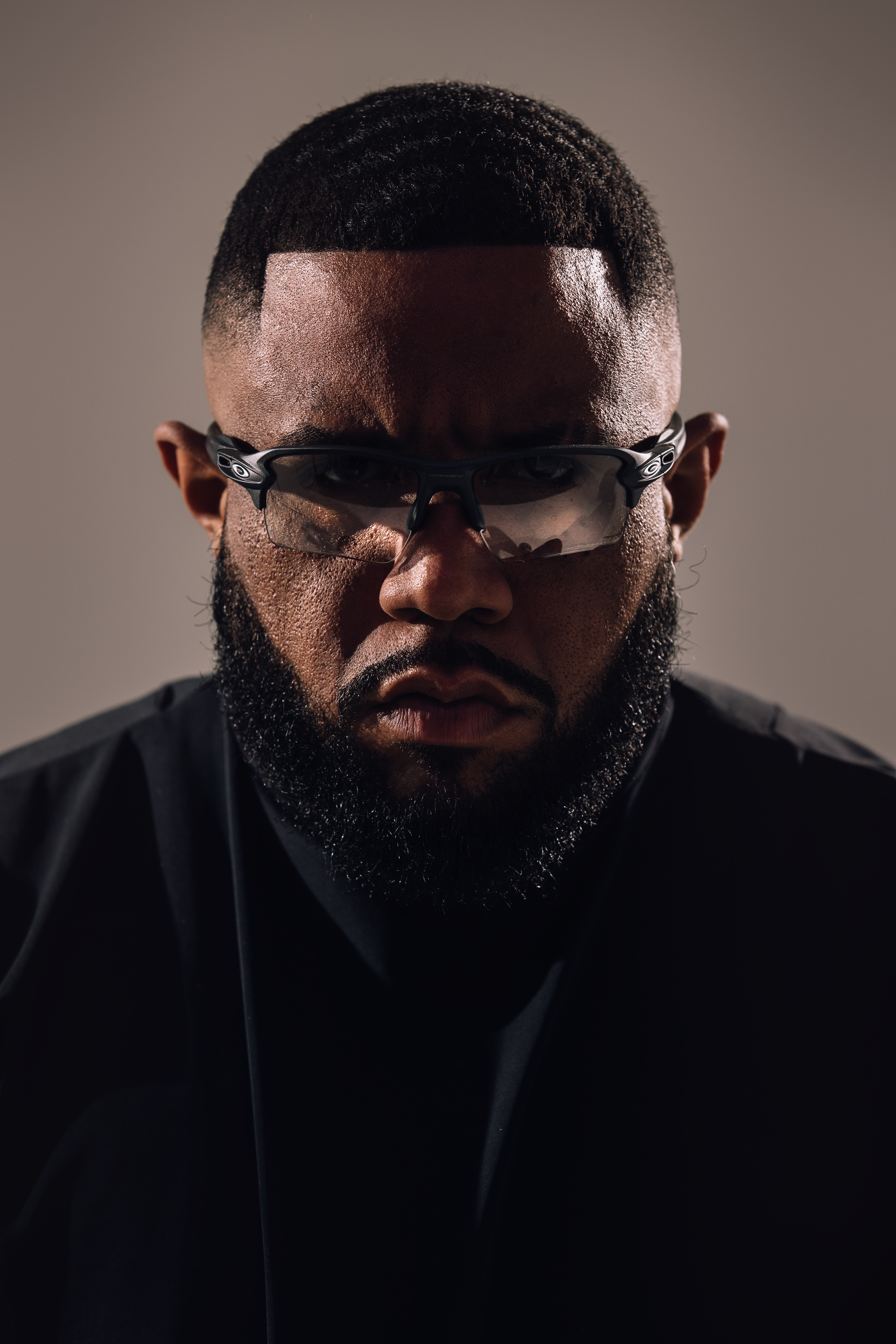
- Gordo in 2022

Background information
- Also known as: Gordo; Carnage; DJ Carnage; Thirty Rack
- Born: Diamanté Anthony Blackmon; January 3, 1991 (age 35); Washington, D.C., U.S.
- Origin: Frederick, Maryland, U.S.
- Genres: EDM; hip-hop; trap
- Occupations: Record producer; disc jockey; rapper
- Years active: 2008–present
- Labels: Spinnin'; Ultra; Dim Mak; Fool's Gold; Heavyweight
- Website: www.gordoszn.com

Diamanté Anthony Blackmon (born January 3, 1991), known professionally as Gordo (stylized in all caps) and formerly known as Carnage (or DJ Carnage), is an American record producer. He first gained recognition for his DJ mixes and live performances at music festivals such as Tomorrowland and Ultra Music Festival. He then began producing EDM singles in 2012 under the moniker Carnage, and signed with Ultra Records to release his 2014 single "Bricks" (with Migos), which was followed by "Incredible" (with Borgore), and "Toca" (with Timmy Trumpet and KSHMR) both in the following year.

His debut studio album, Papi Gordo (2015) peaked atop the Dance/Electronic Albums chart and narrowly entered the Billboard 200. Its preceding single, "I Like Tuh" (with ILoveMakonnen) received gold certification by the Recording Industry Association of America (RIAA). His second album, Battered Bruised & Bloody (2018) further delved into hip hop and was critically panned. He occasionally performed as a recording artist; however, he has since retired from doing so, along with the Carnage stage name in favor of Gordo in 2022, after which he began working solely in production for other artists.

== Early life ==
Blackmon was born on January 3, 1991, in Washington, D.C. to Nicaraguan parents. He was raised by his mother and aunt in Guatemala, before returning to the United States at the age of 10. He attended Walkersville High School in Walkersville, Maryland. When he was 16 years old, he started playing in small clubs in his hometown of Frederick .

== Career ==
=== As Carnage ===
Blackmon made his debut as Carnage in 2012. Blackmon established himself as an artist in the EDM genre. Collaborations with DJs such as Borgore, KSHMR, Timmy Trumpet, and Headhunterz are put to his credit. His 2014 single, "The Underground" (with Alvaro) reached the 4th spot on Beatport's Top 100 list. His 2015 single, "Toca" (with KSHMR) was released through the EDM-based record label Ultra Music.

"Toca" was issued as a single for his debut studio album Papi Gordo, which peaked at number 184 on the Billboard 200. The album also included the singles "Bricks", "I Like Tuh", "WDYW", and "November Skies". Guest appearances included various hip hop artists such as Lil Uzi Vert, Rick Ross, Migos, Rich the Kid, ASAP Ferg, ILoveMakonnen, OG Maco, and Ty Dolla Sign. Blackmon performed minimally as a recording artist on the album, and critical reception was mixed.

In September 2017, he released Young Martha, a collaborative extended play with Young Thug. In April 2018, he released his second album Battered Bruised & Bloody, which mainly explored a trap sound and included the single "I Shyne" (featuring Lil Pump).

=== As Gordo ===
Blackmon rebranded under the alias Gordo at Club Space in Miami, then went on to release "KTM", his first single under the Gordo name, in February 2021. As Gordo, he performed at the Art of the Wild music festival at Wynn Las Vegas in March 2021. He released his second single under the Gordo alias, "Taraka", in September 2021. Taraka was also namesake of his hosted-event series which has appeared up in various locations across Europe and North America. Taraka features underground artists, extended sets and surprise guests handpicked by Blackmon.

In May 2022, he retired the name Carnage after 14 years in favor of his new alias as Gordo. He made the change to reflect his transition from trap and bass to the house and techno subgenres. Following the name change, Blackmon significantly expanded his production. He produced multiple songs for Drake's Billboard 200 number one album Honestly, Nevermind (2022), including its single "Sticky". He has also served as an artist-in-residence at the XS nightclub in Las Vegas. Gordo also performed the final show at Pershing Square before its closure for renovation in August 2022. He also performed at the Electric Zoo music festival in September 2022. The following year, Blackmon produced heavily for Drake's subsequent album For All the Dogs (2023), including its single "Rich Baby Daddy".

== Awards and nominations ==
Year	Award	Nominated work	Category	Result
2014	DJ Mag	Carnage	Top 100 DJs	No. 63
2015	DJ Mag	Carnage	Top 100 DJs	No. 88
2016	DJ Mag	Carnage	Top 100 DJs	No. 84
2021	DJ Mag	Carnage/GORDO	Top 100 DJs	No. 37
2022	DJ Mag	GORDO	Top 100 DJs	No. 25
2023	DJ Mag	GORDO	Top 100 DJs	No. 21

== Discography ==
=== Studio albums ===
Title	Details	Peak chart positions				
Title	Details	US	US Dance	US Ind.	US Heat.	CAN
Papi Gordo	Released: October 30, 2015; Label: Ultra; Format: Digital download, CD	184	1	15	1	—
Battered Bruised & Bloody	Released: April 13, 2018; Label: Heavyweight; Format: Digital download, CD	—	—	—	—	—
Diamante	Released: July 26, 2024; Label: Ultra; Format: Digital download, CD	—	—	—	—	79
"—" denotes a recording that did not chart or was not released in that territory.

=== EPs ===
List of extended plays, with selected chart positions
Title	EP details
Young Martha (with Young Thug)	Released: September 22, 2017; Label: YSL, 300, Heavyweight; Formats: Digital download
No Hay Verano Sin Gordo	Released: December 13, 2024; Label: Ultra; Formats: Digital download, streaming

=== Singles ===
List of singles as lead artist, showing selected chart positions, certifications, and associated albums
Title	Year	Peak chart positions										Certifications	Album
Title	Year	US Bub.	US Tracks	US Air.	ARG	BEL (FL)	CAN	LTU	NZ Hot	POL Air.	URU Air.	Certifications	Album
"I Like Tuh" (featuring ILoveMakonnen)	2015	—	29	—	—	—	—	—	—	—	—	RIAA: Gold	Papi Gordo
"November Skies" (featuring Tomas Barfod and Nina Kinert)	2016	—	—	36	—	—	—	—	—	—	—		Papi Gordo
"KTM"	2021	—	—	—	—	—	—	—	—	—	—		Non-album singles
"Taraka"	2021	—	—	—	—	—	—	—	—	—	—		Non-album singles
"Eenie Weenie"	2021	—	—	—	—	—	—	—	—	—	—		Non-album singles
"Rizzla" (with The Martinez Brothers featuring Rema)	2022	—	—	—	—	—	—	—	—	—	—		Non-album singles
"Leaving Earth" (with KA:AST and Ki Bae)	2022	—	—	—	—	—	—	—	—	—	—		Non-album singles
"Hombres y Mujeres" (with Feid)	2022	—	—	—	76	—	—	—	—	—	—	Promusicae: Gold	Diamante
"R U 4Real" (featuring Marina Maximilian)	2023	—	—	—	—	—	—	—	—	—	—		Non-album singles
"El Más Chingón" (with El Alfa)	2023	—	—	—	—	—	—	—	—	—	—		Non-album singles
"Parcera" (with Maluma)	2023	—	—	—	—	—	—	—	—	—	—		Diamante
"With You" (with Adriatique)	2023	—	—	—	—	—	—	—	—	—	—		Non-album single
"Kill for This Shit" (featuring Young Dolph)	2024	—	—	—	—	—	—	—	—	—	—		Diamante
"Fallin Luv" (with Jeria)	2024	—	—	—	—	—	—	—	—	—	—		Non-album single
"Cafecito" (with Nicki Nicole and Sech)	2024	—	—	—	—	—	—	—	—	—	—		Diamante
"Aura" (with NTO)	2024	—	—	—	—	—	—	—	—	—	—		Diamante
"Sideways" (with Drake)	2024	9	—	—	—	—	44	—	7	—	—		Diamante
"Olvidarte" (featuring Emilia)	2024	—	—	—	4	—	—	—	—	—	11		No Hay Verano Sin Gordo
"Loco Loco" (with Reinier Zonneveld)	2026	—	—	—	—	32	—	7	—	2	—	ZPAV: Gold	Non-album singles
"Energy" (with WhoMadeWho)	2026	—	—	—	—	—	—	— (Note: "Energy" did not enter the AGATA's Singlų Top 100, but peaked at number 58 on the TopHit's Lithuanian Airplay.)	—	—	—		Non-album singles
"—" denotes a recording that did not chart or was not released in that territory.

=== Other charted songs ===
List of other charted songs
Title	Year	Peaks	Album
Title	Year	SPA	Album
"Wet" (featuring Bad Gyal)	2024	82	No Hay Verano Sin Gordo

=== Singles ===
- "I Shyne" with Lil Pump (2018)

== Production discography ==
=== 2022 ===
- Honestly, Nevermind album by Drake
  - "Sticky"
  - "Massive"
  - "Currents"
  - "Calling My Name"
  - ”Tie That Binds”

=== 2023 ===
- For All the Dogs album by Drake
  - "Rich Baby Daddy" featuring Sexyy Red and SZA
  - "Gently" featuring Bad Bunny

=== 2025 ===
- "Gimme a Hug" by Drake and PartyNextDoor
