= List of Billboard Hot 100 top-ten singles in 2026 =

This is a list of singles that charted in the top ten of the Billboard Hot 100, an all-genre singles chart in the United States, in 2026.

== Top-ten singles ==
An asterisk (*) represents that a single is in the top ten as of the issue dated for the week of November 21, 2026.

Key

- ↑ – indicates single's top 10 entry was also its Hot 100 debut
- The "weeks in top ten" column reflects each song's entire chart life, not just its run during 2026.

List of Billboard Hot 100 top ten singles that peaked in 2026
Top ten entry date	Single	Artist(s)	Peak	Peak date	Weeks in top ten	Ref.
Singles from 2025
January 25	"DTMF"^{[C]}	Bad Bunny	1	February 21	7	
January 25	"Baile Inolvidable"^{[D]}	Bad Bunny	2	February 21	4	
January 25	"Nuevayol"^{[D]}	Bad Bunny	5	February 21	2	
October 18	"Opalite"^{[B]}^{[D]} ↑	Taylor Swift	1	February 28	19	
November 1	"Man I Need"^{[B]}^{[K]}^{[Q]}	Olivia Dean	2	January 31	43	
November 8	"Folded"^{[B]}^{[F]}^{[H]}	Kehlani	6	January 10	19	
November 22	"Back to Friends"^{[B]}^{[F]}	Sombr	7	January 10	9	
Singles from 2026
January 10	"Choosin' Texas"	Ella Langley	1	February 14	46*	
January 17	"End of Beginning"	Djo	6	January 17	3	
January 24	"I Just Might"^{[K]}^{[O]} ↑	Bruno Mars	1	January 24	25	
February 7	"Aperture"^{[G]} ↑	Harry Styles	1	February 7	2	
February 14	"The Great Divide" ↑	Noah Kahan	6	February 14	1	
March 14	"Risk It All"^{[J]}^{[R]}↑	Bruno Mars	4	March 14	3	
March 14	"Stateside"	PinkPantheress with Zara Larsson	6	March 21	7	
March 21	"American Girls" ↑	Harry Styles	4	March 21	2	
March 28	"So Easy (To Fall in Love)"^{[K]}^{[P]}	Olivia Dean	5	May 23	24	
April 4	"Swim" ↑	BTS	1	April 4	4	
April 18	"Be Her"^{[K]}	Ella Langley	2	May 16	24	
May 2	"Drop Dead"^{[M]} ↑	Olivia Rodrigo	1	May 2	7	
May 9	"I Can't Love You Anymore"^{[L]}^{[N]} ↑	Ella Langley and Morgan Wallen	4	July 18	14	
May 9	"Doors" ↑	Noah Kahan	9	May 9	1	
May 16	"Dracula"^{[L]}^{[N]}	Tame Impala and Jennie	3	November 14	25*	
May 30	"Janice STFU" ↑	Drake	1	May 30	8	
May 30	"Ran to Atlanta" ↑	Drake featuring Future and Molly Santana	2	May 30	2	
May 30	"Whisper My Name" ↑	Drake	3	May 30	2	
May 30	"Shabang" ↑	Drake	4	May 30	3	
May 30	"National Treasures" ↑	Drake	6	May 30	1	
May 30	"Make Them Cry" ↑	Drake	7	May 30	1	
May 30	"Dust" ↑	Drake	8	May 30	1	
May 30	"2 Hard 4 the Radio" ↑	Drake	9	May 30	1	
May 30	"Make Them Pay" ↑	Drake	10	May 30	1	
June 6	"The Cure"^{[M]} ↑	Olivia Rodrigo	5	June 6	2	
June 13	"Hate That I Made You Love Me"^{[U]} ↑	Ariana Grande	1	June 13	23*	
June 20	"I Knew It, I Knew You" ↑	Taylor Swift	1	June 20	15	
June 27	"Stupid Song"^{[S]}^{[V]} ↑	Olivia Rodrigo	3	June 27	8*	
June 27	"Honeybee" ↑	Olivia Rodrigo	9	June 27	1	
July 25	"Boston"	Stella Lefty	2	August 29	18*	
August 8	"Been By Now" ↑	Morgan Wallen	2	August 8	16*	
August 15	"Petal" ↑	Ariana Grande	4	August 15	1	
September 19	"Bby Wow"^{[T]}^{[U]}	Karol G, Judeline and Rusowsky	6	October 3	8*	
October 3	"Last Thing You Need" ↑	Morgan Wallen	9	October 3	1	
October 10	"Patient Zero"^{[W]} ↑	Taylor Swift	1	October 10	6*	
October 10	"Cleveland!" ↑	Taylor Swift	3	October 10	1	
October 10	"Babylon" ↑	Taylor Swift	4	October 10	1	
October 10	"Pink Clouding" ↑	Taylor Swift	5	October 10	1	
October 17	"Solar Eclipse" ↑	Drake and Don Toliver	5	October 17	1	
October 17	"Nicole Kidman"	Adéla	6	October 24	6*	
October 24	"Babydoll"	Dominic Fike	10	October 24	1	
October 31	"Housewife" ↑	Tate McRae	2	October 31	4*	
October 31	"Expectations"	Olivia Rodrigo and Chappell Roan	3	October 31	2	
October 31	"Lies" ↑	Zach Bryan featuring Lana Del Rey	4	October 31	1	
November 14	"Thriller"^{[V]}^{[α]}	Michael Jackson	2	November 14	1	

=== 2022 peaks ===
List of Billboard Hot 100 top ten singles in 2026 that peaked in 2022
Top ten entry date	Single	Artist(s)	Peak	Peak date	Weeks in top ten	Ref.
May 21	"Tití Me Preguntó"^{[D]} ↑	Bad Bunny	5	May 21	5	

=== 2025 peaks ===
List of Billboard Hot 100 top ten singles in 2026 that peaked in 2025
Top ten entry date	Single	Artist(s)	Peak	Peak date	Weeks in top ten	Ref.
April 19	"Ordinary"^{[B]}	Alex Warren	1	June 7	54	
July 19	"Golden"^{[B]}	Huntrix: Ejae, Audrey Nuna and Rei Ami	1	August 16	39	
July 26	"Daisies"^{[B]}^{[I]} ↑	Justin Bieber	2	July 26	17	
October 18	"The Fate of Ophelia"^{[B]}^{[E]} ↑	Taylor Swift	1	October 18	24	
November 1	"Mutt"^{[B]}	Leon Thomas	6	November 29	8	

=== Holiday season ===
Recurring holiday titles, appearing in the Billboard Hot 100 top ten in previous holiday seasons
Top ten entry date	Single	Artist(s)	Peak	Peak date	Weeks in top ten	Ref.
December 30, 2017	"All I Want for Christmas Is You"	Mariah Carey	1	December 21, 2019	43	
December 29, 2018	"It's the Most Wonderful Time of the Year"	Andy Williams	5	January 2, 2021	24	
January 5, 2019	"Rockin' Around the Christmas Tree"	Brenda Lee	1	December 9, 2023	35	
January 5, 2019	"Jingle Bell Rock"	Bobby Helms	2	December 27, 2025	32	
January 2, 2021	"Let It Snow, Let It Snow, Let It Snow"	Dean Martin	7	January 6, 2024	8	
January 2, 2021	"Last Christmas"	Wham!	2	December 13, 2025	22	
January 1, 2022	"Sleigh Ride"^{[A]}	The Ronettes	8	December 23, 2023	5	
January 7, 2023	"The Christmas Song (Merry Christmas to You)"	Nat King Cole	6	December 27, 2025	6	
December 28, 2024	"Santa Tell Me"	Ariana Grande	5	January 4, 2025	6	
December 28, 2024	"Underneath the Tree"	Kelly Clarkson	7	December 27, 2025	5	

=== Notes ===
^{A} The single re-entered the top ten on the week ending January 3, 2026.
^{B} The single re-entered the top ten on the week ending January 10, 2026.
^{C} The single re-entered the top ten on the week ending February 14, 2026.
^{D} The single re-entered the top ten on the week ending February 21, 2026.
^{E} The single re-entered the top ten on the week ending February 28, 2026.
^{F} The single re-entered the top ten on the week ending March 7, 2026.
^{G} The single re-entered the top ten on the week ending March 21, 2026.
^{H} The single re-entered the top ten on the week ending April 4, 2026.
^{I} The single re-entered the top ten on the week ending May 2, 2026.
^{J} The single re-entered the top ten on the week ending May 23, 2026.
^{K} The single re-entered the top ten on the week ending June 6, 2026.
^{L} The single re-entered the top ten on the week ending June 13, 2026.
^{M} The single re-entered the top ten on the week ending June 27, 2026.
^{N} The single re-entered the top ten on the week ending July 4, 2026.
^{O} The single re-entered the top ten on the week ending July 11, 2026.
^{P} The single re-entered the top ten on the week ending July 18, 2026.
^{Q} The single re-entered the top ten on the week ending August 22, 2026.
^{R} The single re-entered the top ten on the week ending September 12, 2026.
^{S} The single re-entered the top ten on the week ending October 10, 2026.
^{T} The single re-entered the top ten on the week ending October 17, 2026.
^{U} The single re-entered the top ten on the week ending November 7, 2026.
^{V} The single re-entered the top ten on the week ending November 14, 2026.
^{W} The single re-entered the top ten on the week ending November 21, 2026.

- ^{^[α]} – "Thriller" by Michael Jackson originally made the top 10 in 1984, peaking at number 4 on March 3 that year and accumulating five weeks in the top 10. See List of Billboard Hot 100 top-ten singles in 1984 for more. It returned to the top 10 in 2025, adding one more week to its tally then. "Thriller" achieved a new peak of number 2 on the Hot 100 in 2026, and the above entry reflects its run in 2026 only.

== Artists with most top-ten songs ==
List of artists by total songs charting in the top-ten this year
Artist	Numbers of songs
Drake	10
Taylor Swift	7
Olivia Rodrigo	5
Bad Bunny	4
Ella Langley	3
Ariana Grande	3
Morgan Wallen	3
Bruno Mars	2
Harry Styles	2
Olivia Dean	2
Noah Kahan	2

== See also ==
- 2026 in American music
- List of Billboard Hot 100 number ones of 2026
