= List of Billboard Global 200 top-ten singles in 2026 =

This is a list of singles that charted in the top ten of the Billboard Global 200, an all-genre singles chart, in 2026.

== Top-ten singles ==
An asterisk (*) represents that a single is in the top ten as of the issue dated for the week of September 12, 2026.

Key

- ↑ – indicates single's top 10 entry was also its Global 200 debut

List of Billboard Global 200 top ten singles that peaked in 2026
Top ten entry date	Single	Artist(s)	Peak	Peak date	Weeks in top ten	Ref.
Singles from 2024
March 16	"End of Beginning"^{[B]}^{[G]}	Djo	1	January 17	15	
Singles from 2025
January 18	"Nuevayol"^{[F]} ↑	Bad Bunny	3	February 21	7	
January 18	"Baile Inolvidable"^{[F]} ↑	Bad Bunny	2	February 21	9	
February 1	"EOO"^{[F]} ↑	Bad Bunny	4	February 21	3	
September 27	"Man I Need"^{[B]}^{[J]}^{[S]}	Olivia Dean	2	February 14	31*	
November 29	"Where Is My Husband!"^{[B]}	Raye	6	January 17	8	
November 29	"So Easy (To Fall in Love)"^{[B]}^{[E]}^{[H]}	Olivia Dean	7	January 17	11	
Singles from 2026
January 10	"Cuando No Era Cantante"	El Bogueto and Yung Beef	5	January 10	1	
January 17	"Every Breath You Take"	The Police	9	January 17	1	
January 24	"I Just Might"^{[I]} ↑	Bruno Mars	4	January 24	6	
January 31	"Lush Life"	Zara Larsson	8	January 31	2	
February 7	"Aperture" ↑	Harry Styles	1	February 7	1	
February 14	"The Great Divide" ↑	Noah Kahan	10	February 14	1	
March 14	"Risk It All" ↑	Bruno Mars	1	March 14	3	
March 14	"Stateside"	PinkPantheress and Zara Larsson	1	March 28	7	
March 21	"American Girls" ↑	Harry Styles	1	March 21	2	
March 28	"Babydoll"^{[J]}	Dominic Fike	2	April 18	10	
April 4	"Swim" ↑	BTS	1	April 4	19	
April 4	"Body to Body" ↑	BTS	2	April 4	4	
April 4	"Hooligan" ↑	BTS	3	April 4	2	
April 4	"FYA" ↑	BTS	4	April 4	1	
April 4	"Normal"^{[Q]} ↑	BTS	4	August 1	2	
April 4	"Aliens" ↑	BTS	6	April 4	1	
April 4	"Like Animals" ↑	BTS	7	April 4	1	
April 4	"2.0" ↑	BTS	8	April 4	1	
April 4	"Merry Go Round" ↑	BTS	9	April 4	1	
April 11	"Dracula"^{[L]}^{[O]}^{[R]}	Tame Impala and Jennie	2	April 25	18	
April 18	"Choosin' Texas"^{[L]}^{[O]}	Ella Langley	2	August 8	19*	
April 25	"Beauty and a Beat"^{[L]}^{[O]} ↑	Justin Bieber featuring Nicki Minaj	1	May 9	18*	
May 2	"Drop Dead"^{[L]}^{[N]} ↑	Olivia Rodrigo	1	May 2	8	
May 2	"Baby"	Justin Bieber featuring Ludacris	8	May 2	1	
May 9	"Billie Jean"	Michael Jackson	1	May 23	16	
May 16	"Beat It"^{[L]}	Michael Jackson	5	May 23	5	
May 30	"Janice STFU" ↑	Drake	1	May 30	4	
May 30	"Ran to Atlanta" ↑	Drake featuring Future and Molly Santana	2	May 30	1	
May 30	"Whisper My Name" ↑	Drake	3	May 30	1	
May 30	"National Treasures" ↑	Drake	4	May 30	1	
May 30	"Shabang" ↑	Drake	5	May 30	2	
May 30	"Make Them Cry" ↑	Drake	6	May 30	1	
May 30	"Dust" ↑	Drake	7	May 30	1	
May 30	"2 Hard 4 the Radio" ↑	Drake	9	May 30	1	
June 6	"The Cure" ↑	Olivia Rodrigo	2	June 6	7	
June 13	"Hate That I Made You Love Me" ↑	Ariana Grande	1	June 13	13*	
June 20	"I Knew It, I Knew You" ↑	Taylor Swift	1	June 20	2	
June 27	"Stupid Song" ↑	Olivia Rodrigo	1	June 27	11*	
June 27	"Honeybee" ↑	Olivia Rodrigo	5	June 27	1	
June 27	"Maggots for Brains" ↑	Olivia Rodrigo	8	June 27	1	
June 27	"My Way" ↑	Olivia Rodrigo	10	June 27	1	
July 4	"Dai Dai (FIFA World Cup Official Song 2026)"	Shakira and Burna Boy	1	July 18	10*	
July 25	"Wonderwall"	Oasis	4	July 25	2	
August 8	"Been by Now" ↑	Morgan Wallen	4	August 8	1	
August 8	"Animal"^{[S]} ↑	Katseye	10	August 8	2	
August 15	"Petal" ↑	Ariana Grande	2	August 15	2	
August 15	"Kiss Me" ↑	Ariana Grande	5	August 15	1	
August 15	"Stay" ↑	Ariana Grande	7	August 15	1	
August 15	"Oh Well" ↑	Ariana Grande	8	August 15	1	
August 22	"Loser"	Tame Impala	3	August 29	3*	
September 5	"BbY WOW"	Karol G, Judeline and Rusowsky	5	September 5	1*	
September 5	"Boston"	Stella Lefty	10	September 5	1*	

=== 2022 peaks ===
List of Billboard Global 200 top ten singles in 2026 that peaked in 2022
Top ten entry date	Single	Artist(s)	Peak	Peak date	Weeks in top ten	Ref.
Singles from 2022
May 21	"Titi Me Pregunto"^{[F]} ↑	Bad Bunny	4	June 11	27	

=== 2024 peaks ===
List of Billboard Global 200 top ten singles in 2026 that peaked in 2024
Top ten entry date	Single	Artist(s)	Peak	Peak date	Weeks in top ten	Ref.
August 31	"Die with a Smile"^{[D]} ↑	Lady Gaga and Bruno Mars	1	September 7	62	

=== 2025 peaks ===
List of Billboard Global 200 top ten singles in 2026 that peaked in 2025
Top ten entry date	Single	Artist(s)	Peak	Peak date	Weeks in top ten	Ref.
January 25	"DTMF"^{[E]}	Bad Bunny	1	January 25	16	
April 5	"Ordinary"^{[B]}^{[J]}^{[P]}^{[R]}	Alex Warren	1	May 10	61*	
June 7	"Back to Friends"^{[B]}	Sombr	5	September 27	28	
July 12	"Golden"^{[B]}^{[J]}	Huntrix: Ejae, Audrey Nuna and Rei Ami	1	July 19	40	
July 26	"Daisies"^{[K]} ↑	Justin Bieber	3	July 26	8	
October 18	"The Fate of Ophelia"^{[B]}^{[J]} ↑	Taylor Swift	1	October 18	25	
October 18	"Opalite"^{[C]}^{[F]} ↑	Taylor Swift	2	October 18	10	

=== Holiday season ===
Recurring holiday titles, appearing in the Billboard Global 200 top ten in previous holiday seasons
Top ten entry date	Single	Artist(s)	Peak	Peak date	Weeks in top ten	Ref.
December 12, 2020	"All I Want for Christmas Is You"	Mariah Carey	1	December 19, 2020	33	
December 12, 2020	"Last Christmas"	Wham!	1	December 20, 2025	30	
December 12, 2020	"Rockin' Around the Christmas Tree"	Brenda Lee	2	December 24, 2022	27	
December 19, 2020	"Jingle Bell Rock"	Bobby Helms	4	January 2, 2021	26	
December 19, 2020	"It's Beginning to Look a Lot Like Christmas"	Michael Buble	6	January 2, 2021	14	
December 26, 2020	"Santa Tell Me"	Ariana Grande	5	January 2, 2021	20	
January 2, 2021	"It's the Most Wonderful Time of the Year"^{[A]}	Andy Williams	7	January 2, 2021	11	
January 2, 2021	"Underneath the Tree"	Kelly Clarkson	6	December 30, 2023	11	
January 2, 2021	"Feliz Navidad"^{[A]}	Jose Feliciano	5	January 7, 2023	7	
December 30, 2023	"Let It Snow! Let It Snow! Let It Snow!"	Dean Martin	6	January 6, 2024	4	

== Notes ==
^{A} The single re-entered the top ten on the week ending January 3, 2026.
^{B} The single re-entered the top ten on the week ending January 10, 2026.
^{C} The single re-entered the top ten on the week ending January 17, 2026.
^{D} The single re-entered the top ten on the week ending January 24, 2026.
^{E} The single re-entered the top ten on the week ending February 14, 2026.
^{F} The single re-entered the top ten on the week ending February 21, 2026.
^{G} The single re-entered the top ten on the week ending February 28, 2026.
^{H} The single re-entered the top ten on the week ending March 7, 2026.
^{I} The single re-entered the top ten on the week ending March 14, 2026.
^{J} The single re-entered the top ten on the week ending April 11, 2026.
^{K} The single re-entered the top ten on the week ending May 2, 2026.
^{L} The single re-entered the top ten on the week ending June 6, 2026.
^{M} The single re-entered the top ten on the week ending June 13, 2026.
^{N} The single re-entered the top ten on the week ending June 27, 2026.
^{O} The single re-entered the top ten on the week ending July 4, 2026.
^{P} The single re-entered the top ten on the week ending July 18, 2026.
^{Q} The single re-entered the top ten on the week ending August 1, 2026.
^{R} The single re-entered the top ten on the week ending August 22, 2026.
^{S} The single re-entered the top ten on the week ending August 29, 2026.
^{T} The single re-entered the top ten on the week ending September 12, 2026.
