= Maneesh =

Canadian rap producer

- Also known as: DJ M-Rock; Maneesh on the Beat
- Born: Maneesh Bidaye
- Origin: Rexdale, Toronto, Canada
- Genre: Hip-hop
- Occupations: Record producer; disc jockey; songwriter
- Years active: 2009—present
- Publisher: OVO Sound

Maneesh Bidaye, known professionally as Maneesh, is a Canadian hip-hop record producer, disc jockey and songwriter from Rexdale, Toronto. Bidaye is known for collaborating with various acts within the rap and R&B genres, most notably Drake, J. Cole, Travis Scott, Young Thug, Justin Bieber, and Giveon, among others.

In 2026, Bidaye came to prominence after being name-dropped by Drake on the song "Shabang", which quickly became an internet meme following its release. Bidaye also helmed other hits such as "Too Good" (2016) for Drake and Rihanna and "Heartbreak Anniversary" (2020) for Giveon, while also co-writing "Nice for What" (2018) for the former.

== Life and career ==
Bidaye is of Indian descent and is from the Rexdale suburb of Toronto, Ontario. He began his career as a club and radio DJ in the early 2010s under the name DJ M-Rock, putting out mixtapes inspired by artists such as Jay-Z and A Tribe Called Quest. In 2009, Bidaye produced comedian Russell Peters' entrance theme at the Juno Awards. Bidaye also worked with basketball player and disc jockey Shaquille O'Neal and British-American musician Mark Ronson, during which he would later appear on the latter's Authentic Shit radio show while also remixing Daft Punk's 2013 hit "Get Lucky".

In the mid-2010s, Bidaye began collaborating with fellow Canadian producer Frank Dukes and American producer Illmind on Ludacris' ninth studio album, Ludaversal (2015), working on the songs "Lyrical Healing" and "Charge It to the Rap Game". In July 2015, Maneesh began collaborating for the first time with Canadian rap legend Drake on the diss track "Charged Up" after signing a publishing deal with OVO Sound co-founder Noah "40" Shebib. In September 2015, Bidaye co-produced Travis Scott's song "Maria I'm Drunk" from the album Rodeo, which features Young Thug and Justin Bieber. The song became Bidaye's first platinum-certified hit in the United States.

In April 2016, Bidaye produced four tracks from Drake's fourth studio album, Views, which earned Bidaye his first Grammy Award nomination for Album of the Year. Bidaye also co-wrote the Drake—Rihanna collaboration "Too Good" from the album, which was certified 5x platinum in the United States. Bidaye produced the song with Dvsn member Nineteen85 and Jamaican producer Supa Dups.

In 2020, Bidaye co-wrote and co-produced the Grammy-nominated multi-platinum single "Heartbreak Anniversary" for American R&B artist Giveon. In 2021, he produced various tracks from Drake's sixth studio album, Certified Lover Boy, while staying at the OVO camp, as well as on J. Cole's sixth studio album The Off-Season, both of whom were nominated for a Grammy except for Drake, who withdrew the nomination shortly after its announcement. In February 2026, Bidaye was credited on J. Cole's follow-up album, The Fall-Off, co-producing the single "The Fall-Off Is Inevitable".

=== "Shabang" meme ===
In May 2026, Bidaye produced two tracks from Drake's highly anticipated studio album, Iceman: "Make Them Cry" and "Shabang", the latter of whom would later become an internet meme following its release. Shabang"'s production began in 2025 when Bidaye met Drake at a Toronto jazz club. The song's chorus would later become a viral social media challenge in which participants use video editing techniques to make beverages and other objects appear to materialize spontaneously in sync with Drake's verses. Various celebrities such as Summer Walker, Idris Elba and Marc Cucurella participated in the trend.

== Awards and nominations ==
- 3x Grammy Awards nominee
