= Iceman (album) =

Studio album by Drake
- Released: May 15, 2026
- Recorded: 2024–2026
- Genre: Hip-hop
- Length: 68:51
- Labels: OVO; Republic
- Producers: 20; 2one2; 40; 5ebas; 9Jay; Al Hug; Alex Lustig; Ambezza; AzizTheShake; Azul; B4U; Batmanonthebeatz; BeDrm; Ben10k; Ben Lusher; Boi-1da; Boi Yanel; CavMcKnight; Chahayed; Conductor Williams; Coop the Truth; Dez Wright; Digital Jet; DJ Frisco954; DJ Lewis; DrtWrk; Dylan Hyde; Eli Brown; Elkan; Elyas; Evin; Fierce; Flywilliums; FnZ; Gabe Lucas; Geminichxld; Glitchrealm; Gyz; Hanzbeats; Hidde; Jeek; Jester Beats; Joey Ramirez; Karri; LAF Collective; Jack LoMastro; London Cyr; MakeYouKnowLove; Maneesh; Manny Manhattan; Mars; Max Moise; Mxssivh; Nasamadeit; Nico Baran; Nik D; O Lil Angel; Ovrkast; Oz; Patron; P-Lo; Prodkavin; Pyrex; RL; Sem0r; Skeyez; SkipOnDaBeat; Sledgren; Smash David; Southside; Spvde; Sucuki; Tay Keith; Thomas Madynski; Ties; Timothy; Tom Levesque; Wheezy; Wraith9

Drake chronology
Some Sexy Songs 4 U (2025)	Iceman (2026)	Maid of Honour (2026)

Singles from Iceman
- 1. "What Did I Miss?" Released: July 5, 2025; 2. "2 Hard 4 the Radio / Janice STFU" Released: May 19, 2026; 3. "Shabang" Released: June 16, 2026

Iceman (stylized in all caps) is the ninth studio album by Canadian rapper Drake, released through OVO Sound and Republic Records on May 15, 2026 alongside his surprise tenth and eleventh studio albums (Note: Despite their simultaneous release, the albums are sequentially ordered by their preceding singles; Iceman and Maid of Honour saw their preceding singles released on July 5 and July 25, 2025, respectively, whereas Habibti was not preceded by a single.) Maid of Honour and Habibti. The albums are a follow-up to Drake's collaborative album Some Sexy Songs 4 U (2025) and mark his first solo albums since For All the Dogs (2023).

Production for Iceman was handled by Drake's frequent collaborators, including 40, Boi-1da, and Tay Keith, among others, and features guest appearances from Future, Molly Santana, and 21 Savage. The album is characterized by its firm hip-hop oriented aesthetic, and was supported by the singles "What Did I Miss?", "2 Hard 4 the Radio", "Janice STFU", and "Shabang". Iceman's lyrical themes refer to betrayal (particularly from his feud with Kendrick Lamar), industry politics amid Drake's dispute with Universal Music Group, as well as resentment, revenge, loneliness and vulnerability.

Iceman received generally mixed critical reception, with praise for its production and lyrics, but criticism for its length and focus on past feuds. "Janice STFU" debuted at number one on the US Billboard Hot 100, marking Drake's fourteenth US number one song, breaking Michael Jackson's record for most US number ones by a male artist since the chart's 1958 inception.

Iceman opened with first-week sales of 463,000 album-equivalent units in the United States and topped the US Billboard 200, with Drake setting the record for most US number-one albums by a male artist and tying Taylor Swift for most US number-one albums by a solo artist (15). With Habibti and Maid of Honour debuting at number two and three, respectively, Drake became the first artist ever to hold the top three spots on the Billboard 200 concurrently. Iceman also reached number one in Canada, Australia, Ireland, New Zealand, the Netherlands, and the United Kingdom.

== Background ==
Drake began teasing his ninth album in August 2024, which was rumored to be titled Iceman, by releasing the EP 100 Gigs (2024) and cryptic messages on his social media accounts. This was followed by OVO artist Smiley claiming Drake was doing "hard work" for the album in a June 2025 interview discussing the release of their collaboration "2 Mazza". Drake brought Gordo to work on the album's production by August 2025, and, in the same month, a possible U.S. tour for the album was teased on social media.

== Promotion ==
On July 4, 2025, nearly five months after the release of his collaborative studio album Some Sexy Songs 4 U with PartyNextDoor, Drake began teasing solo material; the single "What Did I Miss?" was released a day later, following a YouTube livestream titled "Iceman: Episode 1". On the livestream, Drake drives an Iceman-branded truck around Toronto, drawing a crowd of fans, and eventually arrives to an Iceman-branded warehouse, where he eats food and watches old videos of himself. It then transitions to a performance of the song.

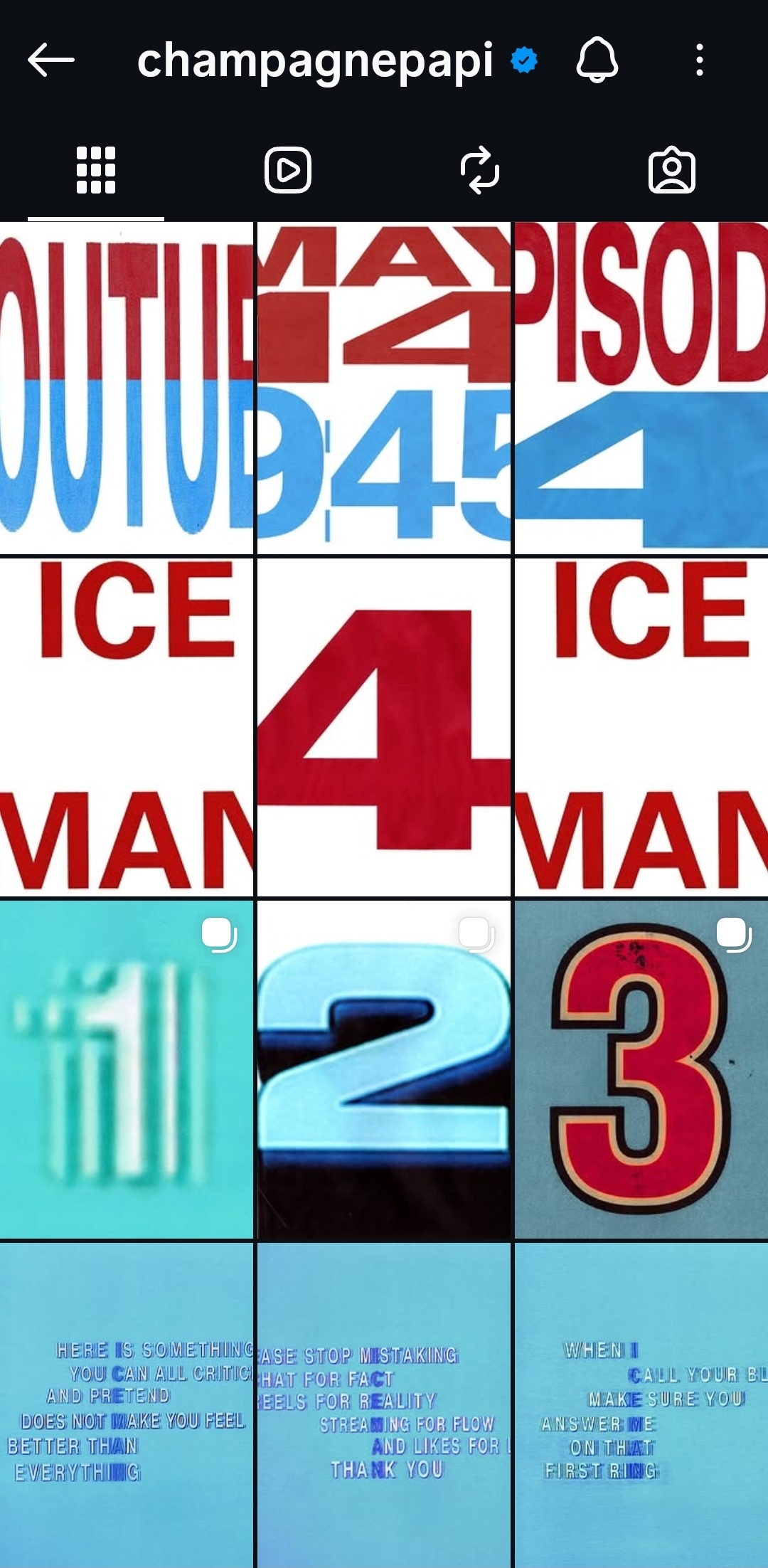
Drake's Instagram page on May 14th, containing multiple promotional posts relating to the first three episodes of the Iceman livestream series, and the Iceman album.

Another song, rumored to be titled "Supermax", was also previewed during the livestream. On the song, Drake mentions reporter Taylor Rooks, rapping, "Losin' all these friends really got to me/ I was talking to Taylor over drinks, and it was getting deep/ 'Not everyone can handle this pressure and, in thе city, you're the national treasurе', that's what she said to me". According to Michael Saponara of Billboard, this depicts Drake "looking inward and vulnerably [opening] up about fractured relationships and keeping his focus." Possible collaborations with British-American rapper 21 Savage and American rapper Playboi Carti were also previewed during the livestream: 21 Savage collaborated with Drake on numerous songs and on a joint-album in 2022, while Carti previously collaborated with Drake on 2020's "Pain 1993" and 2024's "No Face", however he was ultimately removed from the latter upon its streaming release. DJ Swamp Izzo, who provided ad-libs on Carti's 2025 album Music, also previewed the collaboration on social media. "Supermax" was not included on the album.

A second livestream, titled "Iceman: Episode 2", aired on July 24. Three tracks were previewed during the livestream: "Which One" with British rapper Central Cee, which had been previewed at Drake's 2025 Wireless Festival set and during the first livestream, in addition to two untitled songs that are expected to feature on the album. "Which One" was released as a single a day later, marking Drake's second collaboration with Central Cee following 2023's "On the Radar Freestyle". The song was not included on Iceman, but featured on its companion album Maid of Honour. The second episode depicted Drake being chased by Pinocchio throughout Manchester until he eventually escapes to Manchester Piccadilly station. The livestream concluded with a graphic that read "COMING SOON", with Pinocchio's head in place of the letter "I". According to Srosh Khan of the BBC, the character's presence in the livestream was interpreted to represent the lies "following Drake around" in the aftermath of his feud with Lamar.

A third livestream, "Iceman: Episode 3", aired on September 4, taking place in Milan. Several songs were previewed during the livestream, including the tentatively titled "That's Just How I Feel", as well as "Dog House". "That's Just How I Feel" was repurposed into "Janice STFU" on the album, while the latter features American singer Julia Wolf and American rapper Yeat, who appeared in the livestream. The episode was also noted for its continued depiction of Pinocchio, who appeared in previous episodes. In one scene, four Pinocchio characters sit at a restaurant table, with one writing "LEGACY" on the table in red paint before tossing ice cubes onto it. At the end of the stream, Drake is seen confronting three of the Pinocchio characters. Following the livestream, one of the previewed tracks, "Somebody Loves Me Pt. 2" was released; it is a remix of "Somebody Loves Me" from Some Sexy Songs 4 U and features American rapper Cash Cobain.

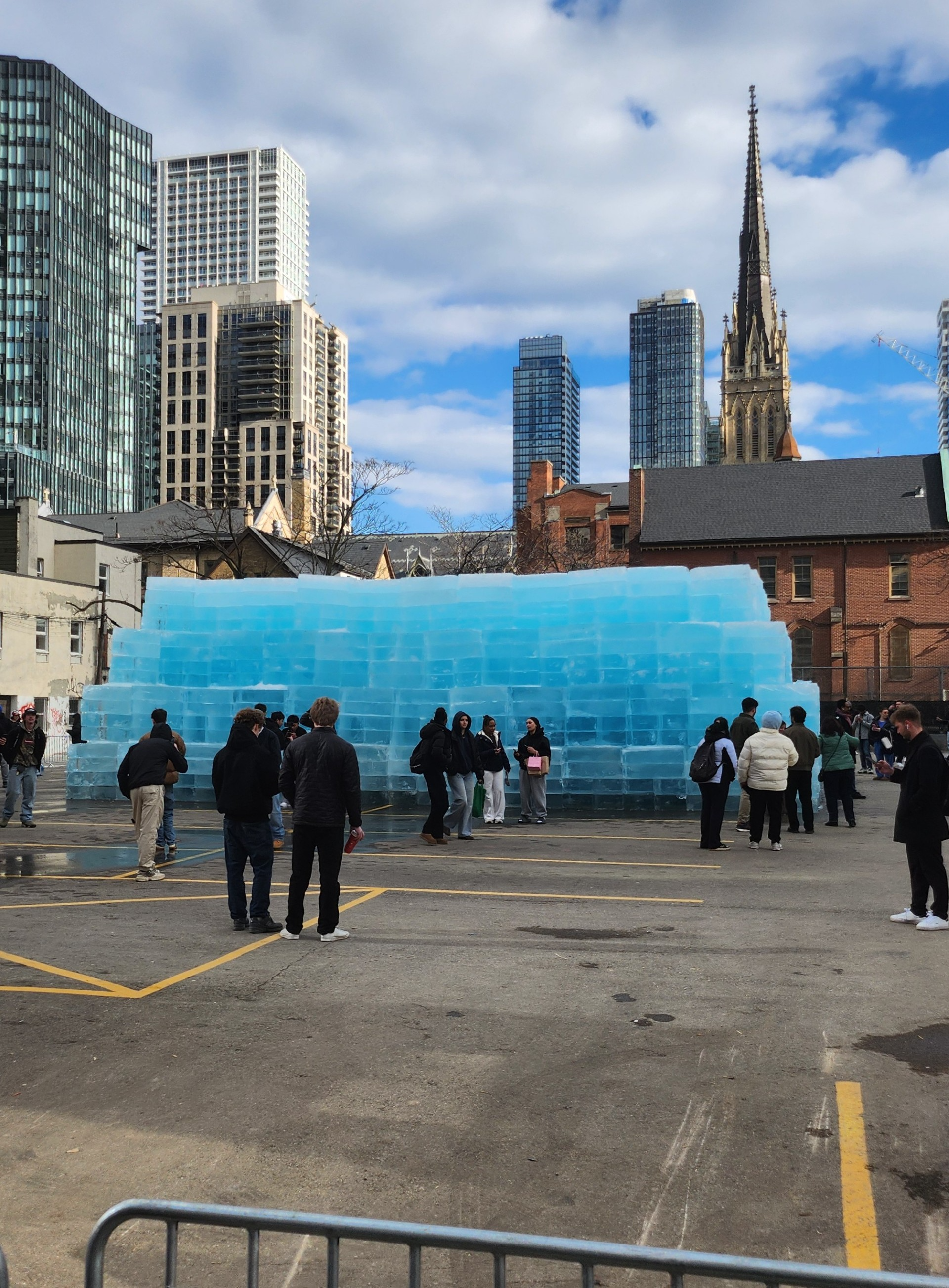
The ice sculpture built to promote the release date of Iceman. Fans were encouraged to hack at the sculpture to locate an envelope which contained the release date of the album

On September 13, a snippet of a track from Iceman leaked online during a livestream; the track's instrumental was previously previewed at the end of "Iceman: Episode 2". The snippet contains lyrics referencing former Toronto Raptors players DeMar DeRozan and Kawhi Leonard, with Drake rapping "When you was a part of the team we used to be planning our Mexico trips in the spring, we must've been dealing with the spur of the moment 'cause why (Kawhi) did we think you could get us a ring?". Drake takes aim at DeRozan, referencing his playoff losses with the Raptors and his 2018 trade to the San Antonio Spurs for Leonard (who won the 2019 NBA Finals with Toronto). Following the leak, Drake stated to streamer Adin Ross "I don't even know who the fuck those kids are", referring to the streamers that leaked the track. The song was eventually included on the album, titled "National Treasures". The leaked version of the track included a feature from Canadian rapper Pressa which was removed from the released version on the album.

On April 12, 2026, when Drake attended the Toronto Raptors final regular-season game against the Brooklyn Nets at Scotiabank Arena, his courtside seats were covered in faux ice, as a teaser for the album. Four days later, a music video was filmed near Downsview Airport, featuring an explosion. On April 20, a 25 foot tall ice sculpture in downtown Toronto was installed, with Drake revealing that the album's release date was hidden within the sculpture. The area was sealed off by Toronto police due to safety concerns after fans hacked at the statue with pickaxes and hammers, and lit it on fire. On April 21, the release date for Iceman was revealed to be May 15, after online streamer Kishka found a bag in the ice sculpture: the bag contained a magazine and a pin-up of Pachinko character Pachio-kun, which listed the release date.

On May 13, 2026, a song tentatively titled "1AM in Albany" was leaked on social media, which includes disses to Kendrick Lamar and LeBron James; the track is included on Iceman under the title "Make Them Remember". That night, the CN Tower was lit up with various patterns and text with projectors, which was speculated to be related to the album. A day later, "Iceman: Episode 4" was livestreamed on YouTube by CTV News, CP24 and Drake, registering over 458,000 concurrent viewers at its peak. The episode depicted several songs and accompanying music videos from the album and concluded by stating that three albums would be releasing on May 15: Iceman, Habibti, and Maid of Honour.

The jewel-encrusted glove featured on the album cover carries additional significance given Drake's history with Michael Jackson memorabilia. In October 2023, Drake celebrated tying Jackson's record for most number-one songs on the Billboard Hot 100 by a male soloist by posting photos of himself wearing a glove resembling Jackson's famous crystal-studded accessory, which Jackson wore performing "Billie Jean" at the 1983 Grammy Awards and during his 1984 Victory Tour. Jackson's original rhinestone glove is described by KTLA as "one of the most recognizable objects in the history of pop culture"; the glove was put up for auction in April 2026, coinciding with the release of the Michael Jackson biopic Michael.

== Lyrics and themes ==
In "What Did I Miss?", Drake addresses the aftermath of his feud with Kendrick Lamar, calling out those who attempted to "play both sides" rather than support him. The song includes references to Lamar's Pop Out concert and other nods to their conflict. The song features Drake's blend of "slick melodies and razor-sharp raps", as he addresses people he believes betrayed him and questions the authenticity of past friendships by rapping, "I saw bro went to Pop Out with them, but been dick riding gang since 'Headlines'". This lyric was interpreted to refer to NBA players DeMar DeRozan and LeBron James.

According to Jeff Ihaza of Rolling Stone, Drake is "in a familiar register" by referencing his 2024 feuds with other artists on the album, rapping, "All those summers of slappers, you owe me" on an untitled song, which features a "sped-up" beat switch, while on another song, speculated to be a freestyle with a "moody, lo-fi jerk-inspired" beat, Drake raps, "[I] ain't even know how bad they wanna see me go". This was echoed by Malcolm Trapp of Rap-Up, who said, "it's hard not to connect [these] lines to his very public feud with Lamar".

Several outlets and writers offered explanations of the meanings behind the album's title: Michael Saponara of Billboard said it could refer to Drake's "icy" jewelry, the impact of Canada's snowy winters, and former NBA player George Gervin and former mixed martial artist Chuck Liddell, who are both nicknamed "the Iceman". The title could also refer to the Marvel Comics character Bobby Drake / Iceman, a founding member of the X-Men who comic book writer Mike Carey describes as "devastatingly honest [and] very up-front with his emotions and his thoughts all the time". In his analysis of "Iceman: Episode 4", Vulture's Craig Jenkins said the title is a reference to criminal hitman Richard Kuklinski, whose nickname "the Iceman" was derived from freezing the body of one of his victims to conceal the time of death.

== Commercial performance ==
In the United States, Iceman debuted at number one on the Billboard 200 chart, selling 463,000 album-equivalent units. This consisted of 449,000 streaming equivalent units (equaling 462.2 million on-demand official streams of the album's 18 tracks), 13,000 pure album sales and 1,000 track equivalent units; cumulatively, Drake amassed 687,000 album equivalent album units sold for the three albums in their first week. Iceman marked his 15th number-one album on the chart, tying him with Taylor Swift for the most US number-one albums among solo acts. With Habibti and Maid of Honour debuting at number two and three, respectively, Drake became the first artist ever to hold the top three spots on the Billboard 200 concurrently. In its second week, Iceman sold 225,000 album equivalent units, retaining its number one status on the Billboard 200. It retained a third straight week at number one after selling 171,000 album-equivalent units in the subsequent week.

In the United Kingdom, Iceman debuted at number one on the UK Albums Chart, becoming Drake seventh UK number one album. Along with the other albums, Drake became the first artist to debut three studio albums inside the top-ten simultaneously, and brought his total number of albums to debut in the UK top ten to seventeen. In Australia, Iceman debuted atop the ARIA Albums Chart, making Drake the first act to debut three studio albums in the top ten in the same week, with Maid of Honour at five and Habibti at six. The album also debuted at number one on the New Zealand Albums Chart.

== Critical reception ==
Professional ratings
Aggregate scores
Source	Rating
Metacritic	51/100
Review scores
Source	Rating
The Arts Desk	(Note: Score is shared with Habibti and Maid of Honour)
Clash	6/10
Consequence	B−
The Guardian	2/5 stars
The Irish Times	2/5 stars
NME	3.5/5 stars
Pitchfork	4.8/10
Rolling Stone	3/5 stars
Slant Magazine	2/5 stars
The Sydney Morning Herald	3/5 stars

According to the review aggregator Metacritic, Iceman received "mixed or average reviews" based on a weighted average score of 51 out of 100 from 12 (3 positive, 8 mixed, 1 negative) critic scores.

Writing for The Arts Desk, Thomas H. Green wrote that on the record, "the backing tracks are gloopy slow-mo' over which Drake mainly chats about how he's 'flippin' dough' and how people don't appreciate his magnificence". In a review for Clash, Joe Simpson wrote that Iceman "makes it evident from kick off that the scars of [Drake's feuds] are still painful for [him]". Simpson praised "Make Them Cry" for its "real, refreshing moments of vulnerability" and positively compared it to Drake's earlier releases, as well as Future's performance. Simpson also praised the "masterful wordplay and stellar delivery" on "Make Them Pay", "Make Them Remember" and "National Treasures", calling Iceman Drake's best album since Her Loss. However, he criticized the album for its length. Kiana Fitzgerald for Consequence wrote that "Drake hasn't absorbed the trauma of what he's been through" and that she "can understand why, the poor thing, but it's becoming a bit of a problem. His output is mirroring his lack of self-reflection". Fitzgerald concluded her review noting that "Iceman is Drake's unearned victory lap". The Guardian's Alexis Petridis praised the production on "Ran to Atlanta", "Burning Bridges" and "National Treasures" (and singled out Molly Santana's feature as an "impressive turn") but said Iceman's "great moments are adrift amid a lot of underwhelming stuff [and] filler".

Ed Power for The Irish Times wrote that "for all the background heat, Iceman amounts to little more than a po-faced portrait of an artist adrift and with little to cling to beyond an enthusiastically nurtured sense of victimhood" and that "hell has frozen over, and nothing can melt the walls of self‑pity Drake has built around himself". In a positive review for Variety, Peter A. Berry labeled Iceman "the fun and vindictive comeback record [Drake] needed", commending its writing as "incisive as [it] is tidy" and highlighted its soul-inspired and maximalist trap production. He also praised its tone for its "direct bloodthirstiness" and honesty, stating that, despite its length, it has "enough sonic and tonal variance [to avoid] the monochromatic purgatory of [Drake's] last three solo releases". Pitchfork writer Jayson Greene called Iceman "a missed opportunity", saying Drake's lyrical content "picks up some weapons-grade plutonium here and there, only to gingerly set it back down", and concluded the album is "a long platter of cold, lumpy self-pity". In a mixed review of the three-album release, Roisin O'Connor of The Independent said that "some of [Drake's] best work in years is present [on Iceman]", praising "Make Them Cry" in particular, but added that "it's obscured by the bad", concluding, "Iceman starts strong [but] quickly melts into a soggy mess of erratic beat switches, misogyny, autotune and a rehashing of old gripes".

Rolling Stone's Jeff Ihaza wrote that "though it's far from Drake's most compelling work, Iceman accomplishes the task of clearing the field after he'd been declared, among other things, dead. Which, to his credit, was a rather tall order". Paul Attard for Slant Magazine wrote that "Iceman plays like a concept album set in an alternate universe where a two-year-old rap beef remains the driving discourse of public life, as though millions of people are waking up each morning and asking themselves how Drake is holding up". Attard continued that "this has been the Drizzy dichotomy for some time now, and it's rarely felt more contradictory than it does here". Writing for The Sydney Morning Herald, Robert Morgan wrote that "Drake's in prime emcee mode on Iceman but 18 tracks of it is exhausting, like you're being subjected to a friend's endless tirades against a co-worker".

Additional commentary from publications was similarly divided. In positive reviews, The Setonian argued that Iceman demonstrated Drake's continued cultural relevance within the music industry, Showbiz by PS described the album as Drake's strongest work in years, and SHIFTER argued that the project further reinforced Drake's standing as one of hip-hop's strongest lyricists.

== Impact and commentary ==
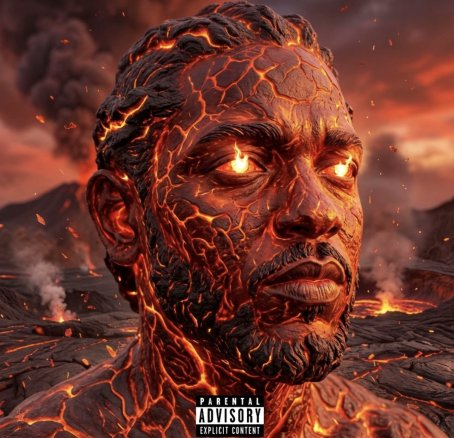
Fake album cover for Fireman by Kendrick Lamar

In the lead-up to the release of Iceman, fans spread Internet memes about a hypothetical title track featuring lyrics that rhyme the word "Iceman" with "nice man", as well as lines such as "I'll cook some rice, man". Unexpectedly, the track "National Treasures" did contain the humorous rhyme: "Ironic 'cause the Iceman was a nice man, now I'm hot and cold." Complex speculated that the lyric may be inspired by the meme.

Upon the reveal of Iceman's release date, Internet memes emerged featuring other artists releasing albums with the suffix "-man" on the same date (a notable example being Fireman by Kendrick Lamar). AI-generated album covers and parody songs with AI-generated vocals of Drake, Lamar and other artists also went viral, with Complex labelling it as a "cinematic universe" of fake album titles and covers. Iceman's album cover was parodied by the second Trump administration, digitally superimposing a chain necklace with letters "MAGA". The post was criticized by users. Billboard noted the second administration's trend of repurposing popular music across their social media accounts.

Reactions among commentators were mixed. Some praised the album's production, experimentation, and cohesion, with GQ describing Iceman as Drake's strongest solo effort in several years, while other reviewers criticized its emphasis on revisiting past conflicts and personal grievances. In contrast to critical reviews, several artists and industry figures responded more positively to the album. Rapper Jack Harlow described Iceman as his favorite release from Drake's 2026 album trilogy and noted that he particularly enjoyed Drake's rap-focused performances. Producer Timbaland praised the track "Janice STFU", describing it as "timeless", while actor and rapper O'Shea Jackson Jr. stated that the song had become "stuck in [his] head", with both reactions contributing to discussion surrounding the track online. Rapper Russ praised the project's replay value, while The Game publicly expressed support for the album amid broader discussion surrounding Drake's return. Rapper and comedian Lil Dicky also reacted positively following the album's release.

== Track listing ==
Iceman track listing
No.	Title	Writer(s)	Producer(s)	Length
1.	"Make Them Cry"	Aubrey Graham; Noel Cadastre; Octavian Godji; Maneesh Bidaye; Jacob Eliasson; Emmanuel Nwaroh; Akash Lakhani; Roger Ridley	Cadastre; O Lil Angel; Maneesh; Boi Yanel; Manny Manhattan; Skeyez	5:07
2.	"Dust"	Graham; Godji; Eliasson; Nwaroh; Thomas Bråttvik; Max Moise; Kerion York; Franklin Cesark; Bradley Baker; James Ferrell	O Lil Angel; Boi Yanel; Manny Manhattan; Hanzbeats; Mesio; Geminichxld; 20; Sem0r; B4U^{[a]}	3:09
3.	"Whisper My Name"	Graham; Ozan Yildirim; Nik Frascona; James Cyr; Baker; Tim Friedrich; Benjamin Wilson; Amir Stevie; Hidde Ament; Timothy Rufai	Oz; Nik D; London Cyr; B4U; Sucuki; Ben10k; Azul; Hidde; Rufai	3:42
4.	"Janice STFU"	Graham; Michael Mulé; Isaac De Boni; Rogét Chahayed; Godji; Baker; Li Lykke Zachrisson; Rick Nowels; Björn Yttling	FnZ; Chahayed; O Lil Angel; B4U	3:57
5.	"Ran to Atlanta" (featuring Future and Molly Santana)	Graham; Nayvadius Wilburn; Mya Parks; Tyshane Thompson; Kobe Hood; Johnathan Bezianis; Wesley Glass; Joshua Luellen; Baker; Samuel Jimenez; Dylan Cleary-Krell; Jaden Christodoulou; Jack LoMastro; Edgar Ferrera; Justin Junagadala; Marlon Betancourth; Kedrick Cannady; Fares Ayass	Wheezy; Southside; B4U; Smash David; Dez Wright; 9Jay; LoMastro; SkipOnDaBeat; Mxssivh; Digital Jet; Pyrex; CavMcKnight	4:07
6.	"Shabang"	Graham; Yildirim; Godji; Bidaye; Noah Shebib	Maneesh; 40^{[a]}	3:08
7.	"Make Them Pay"	Graham; Silas Wilson; Henry Richardson; Deniece Williams; Hank Redd; Nathan Watts; Susaye Greene	Ovrkast; Flywilliums	5:01
8.	"Burning Bridges"	Graham; Jimenez; Baker; Cyr; Betancourth; Alex Lustig; Eliel Afari-Brown; Sebastian Lopez; Jesse Gumer; Kavin Smith	Smash David; B4U; London Cyr; Digital Jet; Alex Lustig; Eli Brown; 5ebas; 2one2; Prodkavin	3:45
9.	"National Treasures"	Graham; Matthew Samuels; Cyr; Godji; Baker; B. Wilson; Stephane Reibaldi; Mathias Liyew; Amir Sims; Nicolas Baran; Ryan Bakalarczyk; Harley Riecansky; Luther Vandross; John Anderson	Boi-1da; London Cyr; O Lil Angel; B4U; Ben10k; Patron; Ambezza; Fierce; Nico Baran; BeDrm; Wraith9	3:20
10.	"B's on the Table" (featuring 21 Savage)	Graham; Shéyaa Abraham-Joseph; Cyr; Baker; Godji; Chahayed; Cadastre; Dylan Hyde; Keegan Lawson	London Cyr; B4U; O Lil Angel; Chahayed^{[a]}; Cadastre^{[a]}; Dylan Hyde^{[a]}; Jeek^{[a]}	2:17
11.	"What Did I Miss?"	Graham; Yildirim; Brytavious Chambers; Mulé; De Boni; Cyr; Godji; Reibaldi; Elias Sticken; Görkem Akyüz; Evin Küçükali; Harold Lewis; Drew Ferguson	Oz; Tay Keith; FnZ; London Cyr; O Lil Angel; Patron; Elyas; Gyz; Evin; DJ Lewis	3:14
12.	"Plot Twist"	Graham; Mulé; De Boni; Cyr; Abdul Dieng; Lawson; Ament; Thomas Levesque; Ferguson	FnZ; London Cyr; AzizTheShake; Jeek; Hidde; Tom Levesque	3:15
13.	"2 Hard 4 the Radio"	Graham; Yildirim; B. Wilson; Paulo Rodriguez; Kevin Carranceja; Marcel Korkutata; Thomas Madynski; Andre Hicks; Khayree Shaheed; Brian Morgan; Wayman Tisdale; Stevie Wonder	Oz; Ben10k; P-Lo; Karri; Mars; Madynski	3:03
14.	"Make Them Remember"	Graham; Ashton Sellars; Karim Hutton; Brandon Chase; Samuels; Michał Suski; Bennet Lusher; Cooper McGill; Hrayr Azaryan	Boi-1da; DrtWrk; Ben Lusher^{[a]}; Coop the Truth^{[a]}; Ties^{[a]}	5:23
15.	"Little Birdie"	Graham; Shebib; Cyr; B. Wilson; Ament; Joseph McCue; Henry Tubman; Dylan Wilkes	40; London Cyr; Ben10k; Hidde; Jester Beats; DJ Frisco954; RL	2:56
16.	"Don't Worry"	Graham; Godji; Baker; Terrel Dawes; Embrack Jevhaun; C. Benedict; M. Guadagnoli	O Lil Angel; B4U; Batmanonthebeatz; Nasamadeit	4:06
17.	"Firm Friends"	Graham; Denzel Williams; Alessandro Hug; Tenzin Ngingthatshang	Conductor Williams; Al Hug^{[a]}	5:02
18.	"Make Them Know"	Graham; Yildirim; Godji; Reibaldi; Lopez; Feliciano Ecar; Luzian Tuetsch; Harrisis Tsakmaklis; Rufai; Anthony Hannides; Michael Hannides; Luka Berman; Joseph Ramirez	Oz; O Lil Angel; Patron; 5ebas; LAF Collective; Rufai; MakeYouKnowLove; Gabe Lucas; Joey Ramirez	4:08
Total length:				68:51

=== Sample and interpolation credits ===
- Full credits are not available at this time for the songs "Whisper My Name", "Ran to Atlanta", "Burning Bridges", "What Did I Miss?", "2 Hard 4 the Radio", "Little Birdie", and "Make Them Know".
- "Make Them Cry" contains samples of "Who Am I", written and performed by Roger Ridley, "The Pressure Is on Me", written by Jaylen Mauti and performed by Muchi, and "Sounds Like a Love Song", written by Douglas Gibbs and Ralph Johnson, and performed by Bobby Glenn.
- "Janice STFU" contains an interpolation of "I Follow Rivers", written by Lykke Li, Björn Yttling and Rick Nowels, and performed by Li.
- "Make Them Pay" contains elements of "Free", written by Deniece Williams, Hank Redd, Nathan Watts and Susaye Greene, and performed by Williams.
- "National Treasures" contains a sample of "This Is What I Believe", written by Luther Vandross and John Anderson, and performed by Gregory Hines.
- "2 Hard 4 the Radio" contains an interpolation of "2 Hard 4 the Fuckin' Radio", written and performed by Mac Dre, and a sample of "That's What I Need", written by Brian Alexander Morgan and Wayman Tisdale, and performed by SWV.

== Charts ==
Chart performance for Iceman
Chart (2026)	Peak position
Australian Albums (ARIA)	1
Australian Hip Hop/R&B Albums (ARIA)	1
Austrian Albums (Ö3 Austria)	2
Belgian Albums (Ultratop Flanders)	3
Belgian Albums (Ultratop Wallonia)	3
Canadian Albums (Billboard)	1
Czech Albums (ČNS IFPI)	3
Danish Albums (Hitlisten)	2
Dutch Albums (Album Top 100)	1
Finnish Albums (Suomen virallinen lista)	5
French Albums (SNEP)	3
German Albums (Offizielle Top 100)	3
Hungarian Albums (MAHASZ)	1
Irish Albums (Official Charts)	1
Italian Albums (FIMI)	3
Japanese Hot Albums (Billboard Japan)	15
Lithuanian Albums (AGATA)	1
New Zealand Albums (RMNZ)	1
Nigerian Albums (TurnTable)	2
Norwegian Albums (IFPI Norge)	2
Polish Albums (ZPAV)	10
Portuguese Albums (AFP)	1
Slovak Albums (ČNS IFPI)	1
South African Albums (RISA)	1
Swedish Albums (Sverigetopplistan)	1
Swedish Hip-Hop Albums (Sverigetopplistan)	1
Swiss Albums (Schweizer Hitparade)	1
UK Albums (Official Charts)	1
UK R&B Albums (Official Charts)	3
US Billboard 200	1
US Top R&B/Hip-Hop Albums (Billboard)	1

== Certifications and sales ==
Region	Certification	Certified units/sales
France	—	15,000
New Zealand (RMNZ)	Gold	7,500^{‡}
Portugal (AFP)	Gold	3,500^{‡}
United Kingdom (BPI)	Gold	100,000^{‡}
United States (RIAA)	Platinum	1,000,000^{‡}
^{‡} Sales+streaming figures based on certification alone.

== Release history ==
Release dates and formats for Iceman
Region	Date	Label(s)	Format(s)	Edition(s)	Ref.
Various	May 15, 2026	OVO; Republic	Digital download; streaming	Standard	
