= Make Them Know =

2026 song by Drake

Song by Drake

from the album Iceman
- Released: May 15, 2026
- Length: 4:08
- Label: OVO; Republic
- Producers: Oz; LAF Collective; O Lil Angel; 5ebas; Gabe Lucas; Joey Ramirez; Patron; Timothy; Anthony Hannides; MakeYouKnowLove

Music video
- "Make Them Know" on YouTube

"Make Them Know" is a song by Canadian rapper Drake from his studio album Iceman (2026).

== Content ==
In the lyrics, Drake addresses his challenges resulting from the escalation of his feud with rapper Kendrick Lamar in 2024. He reflects on how difficult July 2024 was for him, his lawsuit against Universal Music Group and his views on how the Grammys evaluate his music, among other issues. Drake suggests that he has changed significantly since the earlier days of his career.

== Critical reception ==
Armon Sadler of Billboard and Joe Simpson of Clash both praised the song for its display of vulnerability; the former ranked it as the seventh best song on Iceman, while the latter commented "These moments peeking behind the curtain into Drake's psyche, showcasing insecurity and embarrassment off the back of a beef on the global stage make for some of the most interesting moments on the album." Aron A. of HotNewHipHop commented that the song "feels leagues ahead of some of their previous collaborations on Scary Hours 3, channeling the same icy precision that made leaks like 'Fighting Irish' so compelling in the first place. Drake leans into effortlessness without sounding disengaged, which becomes one of the album's biggest strengths." Roisin O'Connor of The Independent considered it a "relief, in a way, to hear him acknowledge on 'Make Them Know' that he's far from the introspective, vulnerable and frequently funny artist of 2010's Thank Me Later, 2013's Nothing was the Same or 2017's More Life."

== Music video ==
A music video was released on the same day as the song. In it, Drake supplies a gas canister and uses it to burn down an apparent bot farm.

== Charts ==
Chart performance for "Make Them Know"
Chart (2026)	Peak position
Australia (ARIA)	42
Australia Hip Hop/R&B (ARIA)	18
Canada Hot 100 (Billboard)	17
Global 200 (Billboard)	25
Greece International (IFPI)	40
Nigeria Bubbling Under Hot 100 (TurnTable)	6
South Africa Streaming (TOSAC)	14
Sweden Heatseeker (Sverigetopplistan)	3
US Billboard Hot 100	21
US Hot R&B/Hip-Hop Songs (Billboard)	17
