= 2 Mazza =

Song by Smiley featuring Drake

from the album Don't Box Me In
- Released: June 13, 2025
- Genre: Hip hop
- Label: OVO Sound; Santa Anna
- Producers: Boi-1da, Fierce, Harley Arsenault

Drake chronology
"Die Trying" (2025)	"2 Mazza" (2025)	"What Did I Miss?" (2025)

Music video
- "2 Mazza" on YouTube

"2 Mazza" is a song by Canadian rapper Smiley featuring fellow Canadian artist Drake. It was released on June 13, 2025, as part of Smiley's project Don't Box Me In on OVO Sound and Santa Anna. The song marks the pair's second collaboration, following their 2021 single "Over the Top".

== Background ==
The song's release coincided with Kendrick Lamar's tour stop in Toronto with SZA, during which Lamar performed his Drake diss track "Not Like Us" to a large ovation from the crowd at Rogers Centre. Music writers noted that the timing of "2 Mazza" appeared to be a deliberate response, with Drake instead turning inward toward his hometown audience. One commentator described the song as a strategic retreat to Drake's local fanbase following a difficult period in his public rivalry with Lamar.

The accompanying music video was directed by Zong Li and was filmed at the Go Place day spa in Markham, Ontario. The track was produced by Boi-1da along with Fierce and Harley Arsenault, and built around a soul sample.

== Composition and lyrics ==
"2 Mazza" is built around Toronto slang and dialect, with its title drawn from a local phrase used to describe something as excessive or out of control. In his verses, Drake recalls a modest upbringing in Toronto with his mother, referencing driving an older car and shopping at the Royal York Plaza.

The song also name-checks the Gonzaga Bulldogs college basketball program in its chorus, drawing commentary from sports media given the program's history of producing Canadian players.

=== References to Ontario locations ===
The song mentions numerous locations across the Greater Toronto Area and southern Ontario. Drake references Barrie, Muskoka, and Brampton, contrasting them favourably with Hollywood and the Hamptons. Waterloo is also referenced early in the song, with Drake alluding to a road trip to the region.

Additional Ontario locations mentioned in the song include Brampton and Mississauga, including a reference to Mississauga's Marilyn Monroe Towers, as well as Hamilton.

== Local reactions ==
The song's references to smaller Ontario municipalities drew attention from local officials and residents. In Barrie, Mayor Alex Nuttall publicly acknowledged the shout-out on social media and extended an invitation for Drake to visit Barrie City Hall. Nuttall said his wife, a fan of Drake's music, alerted him to the reference, and named "Started from the Bottom" as his favourite Drake song.

== Charts ==
Chart performance for "2 Mazza"
Chart (2025)	Peak position
Canada Hot 100 (Billboard)	55

== See also ==
- Over the Top
