= Burning Bridges (Drake song) =

2026 song by Drake

Song by Drake

from the album Iceman
- Released: May 15, 2026
- Genre: Hip-hop; R&B
- Length: 3:45
- Label: OVO; Republic

Music video
- "Burning Bridges" on YouTube

"Burning Bridges" is a song by Canadian rapper Drake from his studio album Iceman (2026).

== Background and composition ==
The song begins with a jazz-influenced piano instrumental, which blends with an R&B slow jam. Drake borrows the cadence of rapper Kodak Black's song "No Flockin". The instrumental then switches to a synth-heavy style as Drake utilizes a laid-back flow with layered vocals. He takes aim at ASAP Rocky and mocks his relationship with singer Rihanna, who used to be in an on-again, off-again relationship with Drake. On the chorus, Drake questions how supportive their relationship really is, claiming that Rihanna did not promote Rocky's album Don't Be Dumb ("Your baby mama ain't even post your single"). Drake also suggests he is refraining from dissing Rocky more harshly out of respect for Rihanna and also references his interview with DJ Akademiks to promote Don't Be Dumb ("You saw my brother, you was tryna fix it / Now you drop your album and you back dissin'").

Drake previewed the song in the fourth episode of his Iceman livestream series, the night before it was released.

== Critical reception ==
The song received generally positive reviews. Armon Sadler of Billboard ranked it as the 14th best song on Iceman and complimented it for its diss toward ASAP Rocky. Alexis Petridis of The Guardian praised the song for "deftly switching" between different styles.

== Charts ==
Chart performance for "Burning Bridges"
Chart (2026)	Peak position
Australia (ARIA)	38
Australia Hip Hop/R&B (ARIA)	17
Canada Hot 100 (Billboard)	13
Global 200 (Billboard)	16
Greece International (IFPI)	31
New Zealand (Recorded Music NZ)	38
Nigeria (TurnTable Top 100)	98
South Africa Streaming (TOSAC)	11
Sweden Heatseeker (Sverigetopplistan)	1
US Billboard Hot 100	13
US Hot R&B/Hip-Hop Songs (Billboard)	12
