= What Did I Miss? =

Single by Drake

from the album Iceman
- Released: July 5, 2025
- Recorded: 2024
- Genre: Hip hop
- Length: 3:14
- Label: OVO; Republic
- Songwriter: Aubrey Graham
- Composers: James Cyr; Octavian Godji; Harold Lewis; Brytavious Chambers; Ozan Yildirim; Michael Mulé; Isaac De Boni; Elias Sticken; Görkem Akyüz; Stephane Reibaldi
- Producers: London Cyr; O Lil Angel; DJ Lewis; Tay Keith; Oz; FnZ; Elyas; Gyz; Patron

Drake singles chronology
| "2 Mazza" (2025) | "What Did I Miss?" (2025) | "Which One" (2025) |

Music video
- "What Did I Miss?" on YouTube

"What Did I Miss?" is a song by Canadian rapper Drake. It was released on July 5, 2025, through OVO Sound and Republic Records, as the lead single for his studio album, Iceman. The song marks Drake's return to solo material following his collaborative project Some Sexy Songs 4 U with PartyNextDoor earlier in 2025.

== Background and promotion ==
Following Drake's feud with Kendrick Lamar, Drake began teasing his ninth studio record Iceman in August 2024. This began with the release of the 100 Gigs EP and him posting cryptic messages on his social media accounts, his backup Instagram account, plottttwistttttt.

On July 4, 2025, nearly five months after the release of his collaborative studio album Some Sexy Songs 4 U, Drake began teasing his first solo material of the year. The release of "What Did I Miss?" was preceded by a livestream titled "Iceman: Episode 1", which featured him driving a truck around Toronto, eventually drawing a crowd as fans recognized him. Additional footage showed the rapper sitting in an Iceman-branded warehouse, eating food and watching old videos of himself, before the stream transitioned into a live performance of the new song.

Until the release of Iceman, the song was the most recent hip-hop single to chart in the top 10 of the Billboard Hot 100.

== Composition ==
In "What Did I Miss?", Drake addresses the aftermath of his feud with Kendrick Lamar, calling out those who attempted to "play both sides" rather than support him. The song includes direct references to Lamar's Pop Out concert on Juneteenth 2024, among other nods to their conflict. The song features Drake's signature blend of "slick melodies and razor-sharp raps", as he directly addresses people he believes betrayed him, questioning the authenticity of past friendships, most notably with NBA stars DeMar DeRozan and LeBron James.

== Charts ==
=== Weekly charts ===
Weekly chart performance for "What Did I Miss?"
| Chart (2025–2026) | Peak position |
|---|---|
| Australia (ARIA) | 37 |
| Australia Hip Hop/R&B (ARIA) | 3 |
| Canada Hot 100 (Billboard) | 2 |
| Dominican Republic Anglo Airplay (Monitor Latino) | 9 |
| Germany Urban (Deutsche Black Charts) | 1 |
| Global 200 (Billboard) | 9 |
| Greece International (IFPI) | 24 |
| Ireland (IRMA) | 47 |
| Middle East and North Africa (IFPI) | 20 |
| New Zealand (Recorded Music NZ) | 29 |
| Nicaragua Anglo Airplay (Monitor Latino) | 4 |
| Norway (IFPI Norge) | 86 |
| Portugal (AFP) | 29 |
| South Africa Streaming (TOSAC) | 7 |
| Sweden (Sverigetopplistan) | 75 |
| Switzerland (Schweizer Hitparade) | 60 |
| Turkey International Airplay (Radiomonitor Türkiye) | 9 |
| United Arab Emirates (IFPI) | 16 |
| UK Singles (Official Charts) | 27 |
| UK Hip Hop/R&B (Official Charts) | 4 |
| US Billboard Hot 100 | 2 |
| US Hot R&B/Hip-Hop Songs (Billboard) | 1 |
| US Rhythmic Airplay (Billboard) | 1 |

=== Year-end charts ===
Year-end chart performance for "What Did I Miss?"
| Chart (2025) | Position |
|---|---|
| Canada (Canadian Hot 100) | 93 |
| US Hot R&B/Hip-Hop Songs (Billboard) | 28 |
| US Rhythmic Airplay (Billboard) | 30 |

== Certifications ==
Certifications for "What Did I Miss?"
| Region | Certification | Certified units/sales |
|---|---|---|
| Brazil (Pro-Música Brasil) | Gold | 20,000^{‡} |
^{‡} Sales+streaming figures based on certification alone.

== Release history ==
Release history for "What Did I Miss?"
| Region | Date | Format(s) | Label(s) | Ref. |
|---|---|---|---|---|
| Various | July 5, 2025 | Digital download; streaming | OVO; Republic | |
| United States | July 16, 2025 | Rhythmic crossover | OVO; Republic | |
