= Make Them Remember =

2026 song by Drake

Song by Drake

from the album Iceman
- Released: May 15, 2026
- Length: 5:23
- Label: OVO; Republic
- Producers: Ben Lusher; Boi-1da; Coop the Truth; DrtWrk; Ties

Music video
- "Make Them Remember" on YouTube

"Make Them Remember" is a song by Canadian rapper Drake from his studio album Iceman (2026). It is a diss track primarily aimed at rapper Kendrick Lamar and basketball player LeBron James.

== Background ==
Following the escalation of the Drake–Kendrick Lamar feud in spring 2024, Lamar hosted his concert The Pop Out: Ken & Friends in Los Angeles on Juneteenth 2024. Although LeBron James was previously on good terms with Drake, he attended the concert, where he danced along to Lamar's performance of "Not Like Us", his diss track towards Drake. Drake has since been feuding with James.

The song was leaked on social media on May 13, 2026, two days before it was released. It was tentatively titled "1 AM in Albany", but renamed to "Make Them Remember". The next day, the song was also previewed in the fourth episode of Drake's "Iceman" livestream series.

== Content ==
Lyrically, Drake explores the challenges in his career that arose from his feud with Kendrick Lamar, along with themes of betrayal. He questions the reasons for the backlash he has received, speculating it may be related to his light skin or Jewish background, before directing criticism at Billboard and streaming. Drake disses LeBron James for siding with Lamar, referencing how he has played for several NBA teams ("I shouldn't even be shocked to see you in that arena / Because you always made your career off of switching teams up") and his jersey number ("Please stop askin' about what's goin' on with 23 and me / I'm a real nigga and he's not, it's in my DNA"). He also criticizes J. Cole for backing out of the feud, calling him a "married rapper". In his lyrics targeting Lamar, Drake repeats the line "I'm down to put bills on they face, no wonder they've been ducking Drake", which listeners have interpreted as a sextuple entendre. He insults Lamar's height, rapping "Muggsy Bogues dunked for once, even I'm a bit amazed, someone give the kid a raise." In addition, Drake takes shots at rappers Dr. Dre and Joe Budden.

== Critical reception ==
The song received generally positive reviews. Armon Sadler of Billboard ranked it as the best song on Iceman for the way that Drake disses and his "lyrical schemes". Jeff Ihaza of Rolling Stone lauded the song, particularly the lyrics "Pedo bars going Number One, and y'all trying to tell me who's grooming who?", considering it a "far more effective rebuttal" to Kendrick Lamar's "Not Like Us" than his previous response, "The Heart Pt. 6". Robert Moran of The Sydney Morning Herald called it a "scorched earth highlight".

Jayson Greene of Pitchfork criticized the song for briefly addressing potentially sensitive issues such as his heritage without further elaborating on them, instead returning to familiar themes of fame and commercial success. Likewise, Aron A. of HotNewHipHop felt that such arguments "ring hollow partly because the album constantly undermines them."

== Charts ==
Chart performance for "Make Them Remember"
Chart (2026)	Peak position
Australia (ARIA)	44
Australia Hip Hop/R&B (ARIA)	19
Canada Hot 100 (Billboard)	16
Global 200 (Billboard)	22
Greece International (IFPI)	38
Nigeria Bubbling Under Hot 100 (TurnTable)	5
South Africa Streaming (TOSAC)	15
Sweden Heatseeker (Sverigetopplistan)	8
US Billboard Hot 100	19
US Hot R&B/Hip-Hop Songs (Billboard)	16
