= Little Birdie =

2026 song by Drake

Song by Drake

from the album Iceman
- Released: May 15, 2026
- Length: 2:56
- Label: OVO; Republic
- Producers: 40; DJ Frisco954; RL; London Cyr; Jester Beats; Hidde; Ben10k

Music video
- "Little Birdie" on YouTube

"Little Birdie" is a song by Canadian rapper Drake from his studio album Iceman (2026).

== Critical reception ==
Armon Sadler of Billboard ranked "Little Birdie" as the 15th best song on Iceman. He praised Drake's use of a chipmunk vocal filter and homage to the late fashion designer Virgil Abloh, adding that "The production is very immersive, and this song stands out because it is a bop among an album full of copious vengeance bars." Reviewing Iceman for The Guardian, Alexis Petridis commented that "'Little Birdie' and 'Don't Worry' are undernourished, and all the vocal effects in the world can't enliven them."However, Drake pays homage to a classic Southern Floridia style with a sped up beat. Speeding up a song became popular in South Florida's Hip-hop scene. DJ Frisco 954, a revered South Florida based Hip-hop producer is credited with the production. Many fans of the style appreciated this homage on many social media platforms.

== Controversy ==
American rapper 1900Rugrat accused Drake of copying the beat for his song "Intro" from his mixtape Porch 2 the Pent on "Little Birdie". He alleged that a year and a half before Iceman was released, around the time he made "Intro", he was contacted by one of Drake's producers and shared unreleased music with Drake's team after Drake was considering working with him. They were particularly interested in using "Intro", but he declined to give them the song because he planned to keep it for his album. Drake also told Rugrat that he would send him a verse, but never did. After listening to "Little Birdie", Rugrat listened to "Intro" again and believed the songs sounded strikingly similar.

== Charts ==
Chart performance for "Little Birdie"
| Chart (2026) | Peak position |
|---|---|
| Australia (ARIA) | 53 |
| Australia Hip Hop/R&B (ARIA) | 21 |
| Canada Hot 100 (Billboard) | 15 |
| Global 200 (Billboard) | 24 |
| Greece International (IFPI) | 60 |
| Nigeria Bubbling Under Hot 100 (TurnTable) | 14 |
| South Africa Streaming (TOSAC) | 17 |
| Sweden Heatseeker (Sverigetopplistan) | 17 |
| US Billboard Hot 100 | 18 |
| US Hot R&B/Hip-Hop Songs (Billboard) | 15 |
