= Muskoka =

Muskoka may refer to:

== Canada ==
=== Geographical ===
- Lake Muskoka, lake located between Port Carling and Gravenhurst, Ontario, Canada
- Muskoka River, a river in the Muskoka District of Ontario, Canada

=== Municipalities ===
- District Municipality of Muskoka, a regional municipality in Central Ontario, Canada
  - Muskoka Lakes, an area municipality of the District Municipality of Muskoka, Ontario, Canada.

=== Political ===
- Parry Sound-Muskoka, a federal electoral district in Ontario, Canada
- Muskoka—Ontario, federal electoral district represented in the House of Commons of Canada from 1925 to 1949
- Muskoka (provincial electoral district), an electoral riding in Ontario, Canada

== Other ==
- Muskoka Airport, a small regional airport located south of Bracebridge, Ontario, Canada
- Muskoka Cottage Brewery, a microbrewery
- Muskoka Magazine, a large format lifestyle magazine published ten times per year in Bracebridge, Ontario.
- Muskoka Wharf, steamship located in the town of Gravenhurst, Ontario on the southern edge of Muskoka Bay on Lake Muskoka
- Muskoka Wild, a United Hockey Union-sanctioned junior ice hockey team from Port Carling, Ontario, Canada
