= Plot Twist (Drake song) =

2026 song by Drake

Song by Drake

from the album Iceman
- Released: May 15, 2026
- Recorded: 2024–2026
- Genre: Hip-hop; trap
- Length: 3:15
- Label: OVO; Republic

Music video
- "Plot Twist" on YouTube

"Plot Twist" is a song by Canadian rapper Drake from his studio album Iceman (2026). The song was produced by AzizTheShake, FNZ, London Cyr, Tom Levesque, Jeek, and Hidde.

== Background ==
Drake first previewed the song in October 2024 during his birthday party in Houston. He teased it in his livestream video "Iceman: Episode 4", which aired a day before the album's release.

The song's outro samples audio from a Twitch stream featuring streamers Yonna Jay and BenDaDonnn, in which Jay notices Ben is wearing an OVO owl chain and asks if he is part of Drake's group of best friends. During an earlier stream, she had jokingly claimed to be featured on Iceman, before learning that she would actually appear on the album.

== Critical reception ==
Armon Sadler of Billboard ranked "Plot Twist" as the ninth best song on Iceman, writing "It sits comfortably between a chill vibe and a dark trap record. Drake's deep voiced-delivery is underrated among his loaded repertoire, and it fits best on this type of beat and mood."

== Music video ==
The music video for the song was released on May 15, 2026. It depicts Drake's lifestyle in his Texas home. In the opening scene, he is wearing a rodeo belt buckle and standing over dozens of firearms lying on the concrete of his backyard pool. Meanwhile, masked armed security are seen sitting in the back of his pickup trucks with custom American flag paint jobs. Next, Drake rides in a camouflaged ATV with rapper Stunna Sandy, flanked by cowboys riding horses in an open field. After that, he spectates a reining competition in a stable, while wearing a light blue cowboy outfit and bandana covering his face. Drake and his entourage are then seen in upscaled designer cowboy wear, with Drake donning a gun belt with a revolver, while armed security guards walk the perimeter. The video ends with Drake and Stunna Sandy posing in a Buc-ee's parking lot by his camo Rolls-Royce, with a "hotmoms.com" sticker lining the windshield. The camera shows the gas station in the background as it slowly zooms in on the rappers.

== Charts ==
Chart performance for "Plot Twist"
Chart (2026)	Peak position
Australia (ARIA)	18
Australia Hip Hop/R&B (ARIA)	9
Canada Hot 100 (Billboard)	9
France (SNEP)	192
Global 200 (Billboard)	11
Greece International (IFPI)	12
India International (IMI)	19
Luxembourg (Billboard)	24
Middle East and North Africa (IFPI)	9
New Zealand (Recorded Music NZ)	21
Nigeria (TurnTable Top 100)	90
Norway (VG-lista)	85
Slovakia Singles Digital (ČNS IFPI)	79
South Africa Streaming (TOSAC)	8
Sweden (Sverigetopplistan)	44
United Arab Emirates (IFPI)	8
US Billboard Hot 100	11
US Hot R&B/Hip-Hop Songs (Billboard)	10
