= Don't Worry (Drake song) =

2026 song by Drake

Song by Drake

from the album Iceman
- Released: May 15, 2026
- Length: 4:06
- Label: OVO; Republic
- Producers: B4U; Glitchrealm; O Lil Angel; Spvde; Sledgren; Batmanonthebeatz; Nasamadeit

Music video
- "Don't Worry" on YouTube

"Don't Worry" is a song by Canadian rapper Drake from his studio album Iceman (2026).

== Composition ==
"Don't Worry" is a melodic song with laid-back production. It includes a reference to the Nicki Minaj–Cardi B feud.

== Critical reception ==
Armon Sadler of Billboard ranked the song last among the 18 tracks on Iceman. He wrote, "Vocally, he sounds great and the beat is cool, but ultimately, this song doesn't compare to the excellence all over ICEMAN. It will probably sound great outside, but with 40 other songs for DJs to pick through across three albums, we'll see if it even makes it there." Reviewing Iceman for The Guardian, Alexis Petridis commented that "'Little Birdie' and 'Don't Worry' are undernourished, and all the vocal effects in the world can't enliven them."

== Charts ==
Chart performance for "Don't Worry"
Chart (2026)	Peak position
Australia (ARIA)	56
Australia Hip Hop/R&B (ARIA)	22
Canada Hot 100 (Billboard)	20
Global 200 (Billboard)	30
Greece International (IFPI)	75
Nigeria Bubbling Under Hot 100 (TurnTable)	10
South Africa Streaming (TOSAC)	18
Sweden Heatseeker (Sverigetopplistan)	12
US Billboard Hot 100	23
US Hot R&B/Hip-Hop Songs (Billboard)	19
