= Molly and Her Week of Wonders =

Studio album by Molly Santana
- Released: May 30, 2025
- Recorded: January–February 2025 (Note: Except "BRB", first recorded in late 2024.)
- Studio: Airbnb (Wyoming)
- Genres: Hip-hop; rage
- Length: 40:47
- Label: Victor Victor
- Producers: Bass; Ben10k; DJH; Alex Goldblatt; Grandmaster Vic; Kaaj; Kavin; Tom Levesque; LRBG; Tommy Parker; PerDu; Radiate; Aaron Shadrow; Showjoe; Supah Mario; Synthetic

Molly Santana chronology
Self-Titled Files (2024)	Molly and Her Week of Wonders (2025)	Black Punk (TBA)

Singles from Molly and Her Week of Wonders
- 1. "Not Regular" Released: April 18, 2025

Molly and Her Week of Wonders is the second studio album by the American rapper Molly Santana, released on May 30, 2025, through Victor Victor Worldwide. She recorded the album in January and February 2025 at a makeshift Airbnb recording studio in Wyoming. Molly and Her Week of Wonders is a hip-hop album featuring futuristic, genre-blending songs. Its title and aesthetics are based on the 1970 film Valerie and Her Week of Wonders; Santana related the film to her experiences as a woman in the music industry, which informed much of the album's lyrical content. The album's lead single, "Not Regular", was released on April 18, 2025; Santana embarked on a headlining tour of North America in support of it between July and August. The album received a positive review from The Fader.

== Background and recording ==
In 2024, Santana released her debut studio album and the Masonic Musik extended play (EP), the latter of which marked her first release through Victor Victor Worldwide and Capitol Records. In December, Santana released a collection of outtakes from her debut album, Self-Titled Files; in an accompying Instagram post, she announced that a new album was coming soon. With the exception of "BRB", which was first teased as a snippet in late 2024, all of the songs on Molly and Her Week of Wonders were recorded between January and February 2025 at a makeshift Airbnb recording studio in Wyoming, where Santana stayed with her team of producers. Santana said she wrote songs in her phone's Notes app whilst listening to a loop for one or two hours, before working with her engineer to layer and "mess with my voice [...] as an instrument". Following the Wyoming sessions, Santana returned to Los Angeles for some additional recording sessions, and to work on the album's cover and an accompying short film.

Although the album was initially not supposed to have any, Che, Hardrock and Showjoe make guest appearances on Molly and Her Week of Wonders. Santana aimed to complete songs the first time around, though some would go through as many as six or twelve revisions in the leadup to the album's release. An early version of the album from around May 8, 2025, featured a song with Don Toliver, whom Santana opened for on tour in 2024, which was cut at the last minute. A song called "Backstabber" was also anticipated to appear on the album, but did not due to sample clearance issues with a Kesha song.

== Composition ==
[Valerie and Her Week of Wonders is] about this girl, and a bunch of priests and evil people trying to snatch her, and they're just following her around the whole movie [...] I feel like it's kind of what the world in general and the music industry feels like as a woman, for real.

— Molly Santana

=== Overview ===
Vivian Medithi of The Fader described Molly and Her Week of Wonders as a "'pop' hip-hop record" featuring "glossy" synthesizers and "rounded" kick drums; he considered its production reminiscient of Travis Scott's second album Birds in the Trap Sing McKnight (2015), which Santana cited as an influence. Billboard's Michael Saponara called its songs "futuristic". Santana's experiences as a woman in the music industry informed much of the album's lyrical content, as well as her life experiences; she said that there was "no [longer any] point in me fake swag talking, because I'm where I wanted to be". Medithi viewed the lyrics as "guarded" albeit more vulnerable than on Santana's previous releases. The album's title and aesthetics are based on the 1970 film Valerie and Her Week of Wonders, which Santana watched after video director and friend Stan Smith recommended it to her in 2024. Santana said she initially saw the title as too long and felt it suggested she was a "one week wonder". After the recording sessions, she rewatched the film several times and came to relate with it.

=== Songs ===
"Handle It" is a bass-heavy track, whilst "BRB" is a rage song featuring "stuttering" production. In the latter, Santana promises to translate her creativity into success. "Not Regular" is a melodic, pluggnB and trap-inspired track that sees Santana discuss the music industry and challenge people who want to dismiss her. "Globe" speaks of an intense romance, whilst "Honest" features a "groggy lurch" and "When I'm Gone" ends with a fading vocal coda similar to the Charli XCX song "Track 10", according to Medithi. Santana said "Set Up" is about people who want to "take your passion or power away from you". The album's penultimate track, "Stupid Money", features a harmonic children's choir.

== Release and reception ==
On April 18, 2025, "Not Regular" was released as the lead single from Molly and Her Week of Wonders. The album was released via streaming services on May 30, 2025. From July 22 and August 12, 2025, Santana embarked on the Molly and Her Week of Wonders Tour of North America. Upon release, Medithi of The Fader praised Molly and Her Week of Wonders as "a serious step up in her songwriting and delivery, a cohesive record with surprising emotional weight." Peter A. Berry of XXL called it "a dynamic effort that points to a new level" for Santana. "BRB" was listed as one of Billboard's "R&B/Hip-Hop Fresh Picks" in the week of its release, with Saponara stating its parent album showed Santana's "repertoire [...] on display". The Fader ranked the album as the 36th best of 2025.

== Track listing ==
Adapted from Tidal. All lyrics are written by Molly Santana, except for "Unstoppable", written with Chase Mitchell, "BRB", written with Joseph "Showjoe" Dagbe, and "Been Did That" written with Barry "Hardrock" Holloway.

No.	Title	Producer(s)	Length
1.	"No Rules"	Radiate; Showjoe; Synthetic	2:15
2.	"Piss Me Off"	Tom Levesque; LRBG; PerDu; Radiate; Showjoe	2:15
3.	"Cayenne"	Levesque; Radiate; Showjoe	1:46
4.	"Unstoppable" (featuring Che)	Levesque; Radiate; Showjoe	2:43
5.	"Handle It"	Levesque; Radiate; Showjoe	1:43
6.	"BRB" (featuring Showjoe)	Ben10k; Radiate; Showjoe; Synthetic; Levesque	2:12
7.	"Not Regular"	Ben10k; Kavin; Radiate; Showjoe	2:12
8.	"Been Did That" (featuring Hardrock)	Levesque; Radiate; Showjoe	2:28
9.	"Acting Nice"	Bass; Kaaj; Radiate; Showjoe	2:25
10.	"Globe"	Aaron Shadrow; Radiate; Showjoe	2:28
11.	"Honest"	Bass; Kaaj; Radiate; Showjoe; Synthetic	2:08
12.	"When I'm Gone"	Ben10k; DJH; Showjoe	2:39
13.	"I Know"	Supah Mario	2:24
14.	"Life I Chose (Miss Americana)"	Levesque; Radiate; Showjoe	2:04
15.	"Set Up"	Alex Goldblatt; Grandmaster Vic; Levesque; Radiate; Showjoe	2:55
16.	"Stupid Money"	Ben10k; Tommy Parker; Radiate; Showjoe	2:37
17.	"Weekend"	Grandmaster Vic; Levesque; Radiate; Showjoe	3:24
Total length:			40:47
