= Make Them Pay =

2026 song by Drake

Song by Drake

from the album Iceman
- Released: May 15, 2026
- Length: 5:01
- Label: OVO; Republic
- Songwriters: Aubrey Graham; Tyree Thomas; Henry Richardson; Deniece Williams; Hank Redd; Nathan Watts; Susaye Green
- Producers: Ovrkast; Flywilliums

Music video
- "Make Them Pay" on YouTube

"Make Them Pay" is a song by Canadian rapper Drake from his studio album Iceman (2026). Produced by Ovrkast and Flywilliums, it samples "Free" by Deniece Williams. The song is a diss track towards numerous artists, chiefly rapper Kendrick Lamar.

== Background ==
Drake first previewed the song on May 14, 2026 in the fourth episode of his Iceman livestream series.

== Content ==
In the song, Drake takes shots at Kendrick Lamar with references to the escalation of their highly publicized feud in 2024. He then targets hip-hop artists who were once friendly with him for staying neutral in the feud (J. Cole and DJ Khaled) or turning against him (Rick Ross); Drake mentions that he helped advance Ross' career and further criticizes Khaled, who is Palestinian, for not expressing support for Palestine in the Israeli–Palestinian conflict. Drake also disses the musician Pharrell and rapper Pusha T, subtly referencing the song "Chains & Whips" by Clipse. He insists that Lamar's streaming statistics are inflated and expresses a desire to be an independent artist.

== Critical reception ==
The song received generally positive reviews. Armon Sadler of Billboard ranked it as the fourth best song from Iceman. Peter A. Berry of Variety wrote Drake "clips Rick Ross and DJ Khaled with petty wit and efficiency. Imagine John Wick sniping two henchmen with one bullet". Kyann-Sian Williams of NME opined that the song "work[s] because Drake finally sounds his age instead of endlessly chasing younger rappers' cadences." Los Angeles Times described Drake as almost evoking sympathy on the song with the lyrics "I need compliments 'cause lately it's just falling-outs and disagreements / Industry is really evil / And I faced the way they paint me, but it hurts just like the Philly Eagles"; they added, "Drake is a rococo master of self-pity, but damned if he doesn't have a real reason for it this time."

== Charts ==
Chart performance for "Make Them Pay"
Chart (2026)	Peak position
Australia (ARIA)	31
Australia Hip Hop/R&B (ARIA)	14
Canada Hot 100 (Billboard)	11
Global 200 (Billboard)	12
Greece International (IFPI)	29
New Zealand (Recorded Music NZ)	28
Nigeria (TurnTable Top 100)	94
Norway (IFPI Norge)	100
Portugal (AFP)	26
South Africa Streaming (TOSAC)	8
Sweden (Sverigetopplistan)	30
UK Streaming (OCC)	31
United Arab Emirates (IFPI)	15
US Billboard Hot 100	10
US Hot R&B/Hip-Hop Songs (Billboard)	9
