= Muskoka Wharf =

Coordinates: 44.9206°N 79.3910°W

The Muskoka Wharf is located in the town of Gravenhurst, Ontario on the southern edge of Muskoka Bay on Lake Muskoka. The Muskoka Wharf is the home port of the RMS Segwun, the oldest operating steamship in North America and the last surviving original steamship from the fleet of several dozen that served the county of Muskoka, Ontario in the late 19th century and early 20th century, and the Wenonah II, a modern replica of an early 20th-century steamship. The Muskoka Wharf, once a vibrant hub of economic activity at the union of a major railroad terminus and steamship port, fell into decline as roads and automobiles were introduced to the region, but has experienced a major economic resurgence since the creation of a heritage-based development area in 2005.

== History ==
The name "Muskoka Wharf" has referred to two different sections of Gravenhurst Bay over time. Unlike Huntsville or Bracebridge, the train station in Gravenhurst was 1.2 km inland from the waterfront. To provide seasonal direct access to the lake and its logging industry and passenger steamships, the first Muskoka Wharf was constructed as a rail spur that split off the main line south of Gravenhurst and extended into the lake on a filled-in pier. At its peak at the end of the 19th century and early 20th century, hundreds, even thousands, of immigrants, summer tourists, visitors, and cottage dwellers were seen on the Muskoka Wharf Station docks, ready to board steamships that would take them to their destinations on Lake Muskoka, Lake Joseph, and Lake Rosseau (together, the “Muskoka Lakes”).

As the waterfront became more popular and as the region's economy boomed with people coming to and from Muskoka, cottages were set up lakeside and Gravenhurst became a very attractive area for settlers and companies. In the mid-20th century, however, the rail-ship combination of Muskoka Wharf started to lose out to the automobile, which could take cottagers directly to their cottagers on newly-built roads. As more people drove to their new cottages and tourist destinations, trains declined in popularity and rail service to Muskoka Wharf ended in 1952. The name faded from use for fifty years.

The original Muskoka Wharf still exists today as "Wharf Road" and is currently lined with private boathouses. The former right-of-way of the spur line that led to the wharf can be seen in places, especially off James Street West just east of Fernwood Dr.

== Recent ==
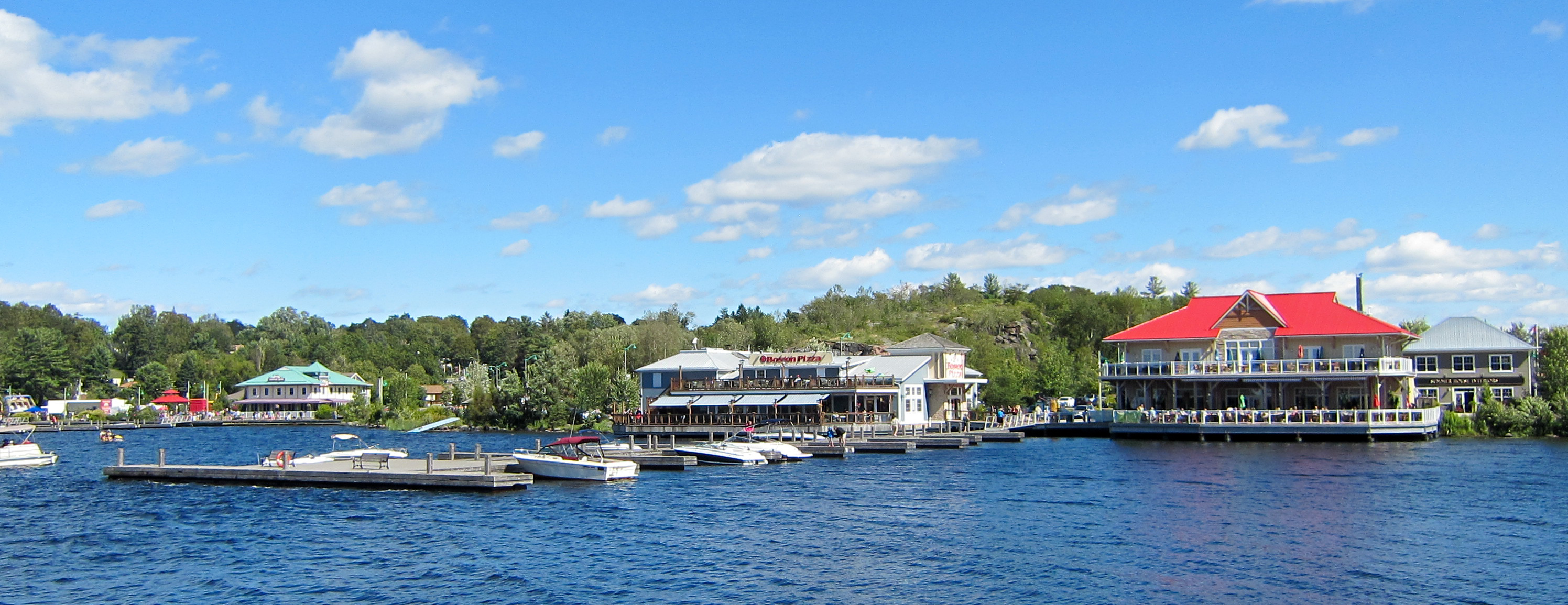
The new Muskoka Wharf, around the point from the original rail pier

In 2005, a $170 million, 89-acre development took place farther east on Gravenhurst Bay, on the site of former sawmills and the town dock. The new development adopted the Muskoka Wharf name, transforming the former industrial land into an improved, “inclusive cottage destination” that now offers boat rentals, hotel rooms, gourmet restaurants, museums, parks and playgrounds, shopping, a farmers market, nearby golf, and more. The new Muskoka Wharf offers a variety of steamship cruises on the RMS Segwun and the Wenonah II.

One of the most popular occurrences at the new Muskoka Wharf is the annual Farmers' Market, established in 1992. Over 80,000 cottagers, tourists, and local residents come to the wharf each year to buy and sell an assortment of arts and crafts, jewelry, produce, meats and cheese, apparel, and much more. People can explore the stores and restaurants, play on the playground, take a swim in the lake, take a boat ride on one of the steamships, visit the marina, or venture off into the town of Gravenhurst. A weekly waterski show is held at Muskoka Wharf during the summer as well as fireworks displays.
