= Whisper My Name (Drake song) =

Song by Drake

from the album Iceman
- Released: May 15, 2026
- Length: 3:42
- Label: OVO; Republic

Music video
- Whisper My Name on YouTube

"Whisper My Name" is a song by Canadian rapper Drake released on May 15, 2026 as part of his album Iceman.

== Charts ==
=== Weekly charts ===
Weekly chart performance
Chart (2026)	Peak position
Australia (ARIA)	6
Australia Hip Hop/R&B (ARIA)	3
Canada Hot 100 (Billboard)	4
Denmark (Tracklisten)	30
Germany (GfK)	45
Global 200 (Billboard)	3
Greece International (IFPI)	9
Iceland (Billboard)	6
India International (IMI)	10
Ireland (IRMA)	45
Latvia Streaming (LaIPA)	11
Lithuania (AGATA)	32
Luxembourg (Billboard)	9
Middle East and North Africa (IFPI)	4
Netherlands (Single Top 100)	29
New Zealand (Recorded Music NZ)	4
Nigeria (TurnTable Top 100)	68
North Africa (IFPI)	7
Norway (IFPI Norge)	62
Portugal (AFP)	4
Romania (Billboard)	23
Saudi Arabia (IFPI)	7
South Africa Streaming (TOSAC)	3
Sweden (Sverigetopplistan)	26
Switzerland (Schweizer Hitparade)	61
United Arab Emirates (IFPI)	3
UK Streaming (OCC)	9
US Billboard Hot 100	3
US Hot R&B/Hip-Hop Songs (Billboard)	3

=== Monthly charts ===
Monthly chart performance
Chart (2026)	Peak position
South Africa Streaming (TOSAC)	5
