= Dog House (song) =

Single by Drake, Julia Wolf and Yeat

from the album Iceman (intended)
- Released: September 9, 2025
- Length: 3:11
- Label: OVO; Republic
- Songwriters: Scro; Matt Bosley; Tyshane Thompson; James Wrighter aka FASHXN; David Jimenez; Benjamin Saint Fort; Noah Smith; Julia Capello; Aubrey Graham
- Producers: Bnyx; Smash David; Bosley

Drake singles chronology
"Which One" (2025)	"Dog House" (2025)	"Janice STFU" (2026)

Yeat singles chronology
"I'm Yeat" (2025)	"Dog House" (2025)	"New Trip" (2025)

"Dog House" is a song by Canadian rapper Drake, American singer Julia Wolf, and American rapper Yeat. It was released September 9, 2025, through OVO Sound and Republic Records; originally speculated to be the third single from Drake's ninth studio album, Iceman, it was not included on the album or on his simultaneously released tenth and eleventh studio albums Maid of Honour and Habibti. It was produced by Bnyx, Smash David and Bosley.

== Charts ==
Chart performance for "Dog House"
Chart (2025)	Peak position
Canada Hot 100 (Billboard)	39
Global 200 (Billboard)	116
New Zealand Hot Singles (RMNZ)	14
Nigeria (TurnTable Top 100)	99
UK Singles (Official Charts)	54
UK Hip Hop/R&B (Official Charts)	15
US Billboard Hot 100	53
US Hot R&B/Hip-Hop Songs (Billboard)	10
