= 2 Hard 4 the Radio =

2026 song by Drake

Single by Drake

from the album Iceman
- Released: May 19, 2026
- Genre: Hip hop • Hyphy • G-funk
- Length: 3:03
- Label: OVO; Republic
- Producers: Ben10k; Karri; Mars; OZ; P-Lo; Thomas Madynski

Drake singles chronology
"Dog House" (2025)	"2 Hard 4 the Radio" / "Janice STFU" (2026)	"Shabang" (2026)

Music video
- 2 Hard 4 the Radio on YouTube

"2 Hard 4 the Radio" is a song by Canadian rapper Drake. It was initially released on May 15, 2026, as the thirteenth track from his studio album Iceman, and was sent to US rhythmic contemporary radio on May 19, 2026, as the album's third single.

== Background and composition ==
The track is built around a direct evocation of "Too Hard for the Fuckin' Radio", a 1989 song by late Vallejo, California rapper Mac Dre. Mac Dre's original song became a foundational document of the hyphy movement—a high-energy hip-hop subgenre originating in Oakland and the San Francisco Bay Area in the late 1990s and early 2000s—and its title was a declaration that his music was too raw and regional for mainstream airplay.

By borrowing this title and cadence, Drake inverts the phrase's original meaning, applying it to his own situation: in the chorus he declares himself "too hard for the fuckin' radio", a pointed reference to his real-world reduced presence on mainstream radio. The song also contains a diss directed at Los Angeles producer Mustard, who produced Kendrick Lamar's 2024 Drake diss track "Not Like Us". The song also includes a tribute to Drake's longtime friend Nadia Ntuli, who died in an ATV accident in 2021 and to whom he had previously dedicated his 2021 album Certified Lover Boy.

The track is produced by Bay Area natives P-Lo and Karri, alongside OZ, Ben10k, Mars, and Thomas Madynski.

== Music video ==
An official music video was released on May 15, 2026, simultaneously with Iceman, via Drake's official YouTube channel. The video was filmed inside the CN Tower's radome where Drake is seen rapping to the beat. At one point, he performs on the roof of the tower's upper levels, apparently without safety equipment. The CN Tower had been made a centrepiece of the broader Iceman launch event the night prior, when 75 projectors were used to create a "frozen" effect on the landmark.

== Context ==
The song's title alludes to what Drake and his representatives have characterised as an unofficial exclusion from mainstream radio playlists. In November 2024, Drake filed a legal petition in Bexar County, Texas, alleging that his record label Universal Music Group (UMG) had engaged in a "pay-to-play scheme" by funnelling covert payments to iHeartMedia radio stations to boost airplay for "Not Like Us", while suppressing his own music. Such practices, known as payola, are prohibited under the Communications Act of 1934 and FCC regulations. Drake sought oral depositions from iHeartMedia and UMG representatives rather than financial damages, stating he had "sufficient" evidence to pursue a defamation claim but required further documents to determine whether civil fraud and racketeering charges were viable.

Drake reached a private settlement with iHeartMedia in March 2025, with iHeartMedia stating that documents "showed iHeart did nothing wrong" and that no payments had been exchanged between the two parties. The settlement was confirmed in a court filing in Bexar County; Drake's legal team stated they were "pleased that the parties were able to reach a settlement satisfactory to both sides." His separate defamation lawsuit against UMG remained ongoing at the time Iceman was released.

== Charts ==
Chart performance for "2 Hard 4 the Radio"
Chart (2026)	Peak position
Australia (ARIA)	15
Australia Hip Hop/R&B (ARIA)	8
Canada Hot 100 (Billboard)	6
Denmark (Tracklisten)	32
Germany (GfK)	92
Global 200 (Billboard)	9
Greece International (IFPI)	14
Iceland (Billboard)	21
Lithuania (AGATA)	87
Middle East and North Africa (IFPI)	14
New Zealand (Recorded Music NZ)	18
Nigeria (TurnTable Top 100)	88
Nigeria Airplay (TurnTable)	76
Norway (IFPI Norge)	73
Portugal (AFP)	22
Saudi Arabia (IFPI)	19
Slovakia Singles Digital (ČNS IFPI)	88
South Africa Streaming (TOSAC)	12
Sweden (Sverigetopplistan)	32
United Arab Emirates (IFPI)	11
UK Streaming (OCC)	18
US Billboard Hot 100	9
US Hot R&B/Hip-Hop Songs (Billboard)	7
US Rhythmic Airplay (Billboard)	1
