= Ran to Atlanta =

Song by Drake featuring Future and Molly Santana

from the album Iceman
- Released: May 15, 2026
- Genre: Trap
- Length: 4:07
- Label: OVO; Republic
- Producers: 9Jay; Dez Wright; Jack LoMastro; Mxssivh; Smash David; SkipOnDaBeat; Wheezy; Southside

Music video
- "Ran to Atlanta" on YouTube

"Ran to Atlanta" is a song by Canadian rapper Drake featuring American rappers Future and Molly Santana from Drake's studio album, Iceman. It was released on May 15, 2026, through OVO Sound and Republic Records, as the album's fifth track.

== Background and composition ==
"Ran to Atlanta" was described as "the club anthem" of its parent album, marking the first collaboration between Drake and Future since 2022, following their reported falling-out after Future's feature on "Like That", a notable track during the Drake–Kendrick Lamar feud in 2024. In the two years between the songs, neither rapper publicly addressed their supposed split, but in April 2026, reports emerged that they had reconciled when Future was seen wearing Drake's Nike Nocta brand. The track was also seen as celebrating Drake and Future's reunion, with the two "putting their issues aside".

The track was viewed as reigniting the "lyrical conflict" between the rappers by referencing Atlanta, serving as a direct response to the third verse of Lamar's 2024 diss track "Not Like Us", in which Lamar accused Drake of only invoking the city when he needed a "confidence boost," while repeatedly calling it the "mecca" for Black culture. The song's production was praised for honouring "Atlanta's sound without being beholden to it," setting a "compelling and confident tone" for the rest of the album. It includes references to Future's Freebandz label, American rapper 21 Savage, Chrome Hearts photographer Laurie Lynn Stark, St. John the Baptist, as well as Santana's repeated line comparing herself to Hannah Montana. Solomon Pace-McCarick of Dazed wrote how the instrumental is a turbo-powered "rage beat full of distorted melodies, neon-lit synths and devilish 808s".

== Critical reception ==
Alexander Cole of HotNewHipHop called the song a "banger," describing it as "catchy" and praising the "spirited performances" by the artists. Joe Simpson of Clash highlighted Future's performance, describing it as an "accomplished performance" and noting the "burying of the hatchet" between him and Drake. Solomon Pace-McCarrick of Dazed wrote how the song is one of the top five best tracks off of Iceman, writing how Future and Molly Santana were clear highlights of the track and how their delivery is exactly what the maximalist beat deserves.

== Charts ==
Chart performance for "Ran to Atlanta"
| Chart (2026) | Peak position |
|---|---|
| Australia (ARIA) | 11 |
| Australia Hip Hop/R&B (ARIA) | 6 |
| Austria (Ö3 Austria Top 40) | 40 |
| Canada Hot 100 (Billboard) | 2 |
| Costa Rica Anglo Airplay (Monitor Latino) | 13 |
| Denmark (Tracklisten) | 33 |
| Germany (GfK) | 35 |
| Global 200 (Billboard) | 2 |
| Greece International (IFPI) | 7 |
| Honduras Anglo Airplay (Monitor Latino) | 14 |
| Iceland (Billboard) | 3 |
| India International (IMI) | 12 |
| Italy (FIMI) | 76 |
| Latvia Streaming (LaIPA) | 7 |
| Lithuania (AGATA) | 35 |
| Luxembourg (Billboard) | 11 |
| Middle East and North Africa (IFPI) | 8 |
| New Zealand (Recorded Music NZ) | 14 |
| Nigeria (TurnTable Top 100) | 36 |
| North Africa (IFPI) | 13 |
| Norway (IFPI Norge) | 60 |
| Portugal (AFP) | 6 |
| Romania (Billboard) | 15 |
| Saudi Arabia (IFPI) | 13 |
| South Africa Streaming (TOSAC) | 5 |
| Sweden (Sverigetopplistan) | 31 |
| Switzerland (Schweizer Hitparade) | 8 |
| United Arab Emirates (IFPI) | 5 |
| UK Streaming (OCC) | 12 |
| US Billboard Hot 100 | 2 |
| US Hot R&B/Hip-Hop Songs (Billboard) | 2 |
