= Dust (Drake song) =

Song by Drake

from the album Iceman
- Released: May 15, 2026
- Genre: Hip-hop
- Length: 3:09
- Label: OVO; Republic
- Producers: Boi Yanel; Hanzbeats; Geminichxld; Manny Manhattan; Sem0r

Music video
- Dust on YouTube

"Dust" is a song by Canadian rapper Drake released on May 15, 2026 as part of his album Iceman.

== Charts ==
Chart performance for "Dust"
Chart (2026)	Peak position
Australia (ARIA)	10
Australia Hip Hop/R&B (ARIA)	5
Canada Hot 100 (Billboard)	8
Germany (GfK)	91
Global 200 (Billboard)	7
Greece International (IFPI)	13
Latvia Streaming (LaIPA)	16
Luxembourg (Billboard)	18
Middle East and North Africa (IFPI)	12
New Zealand (Recorded Music NZ)	17
Nigeria (TurnTable Top 100)	81
Norway (IFPI Norge)	78
Portugal (AFP)	10
Slovakia Singles Digital (ČNS IFPI)	65
South Africa Streaming (TOSAC)	7
Sweden (Sverigetopplistan)	46
United Arab Emirates (IFPI)	10
UK Streaming (Official Charts)	16
US Billboard Hot 100	8
US Hot R&B/Hip-Hop Songs (Billboard)	7
