= Janice STFU =

2026 single by Drake

Single by Drake

from the album Iceman
- Released: May 19, 2026
- Genre: Hip-hop; R&B
- Length: 3:57
- Label: OVO; Republic
- Songwriters: Aubrey Graham; Octavian Godji; Bradley Baker; Rogét Chahayed; Isaac De Boni; Michael Mulé; Björn Yttling; Rick Nowels; Lykke Li
- Producers: FnZ; B4U; Rogét Chahayed

Drake singles chronology
"Dog House" (2025)	"Janice STFU" / "2 Hard 4 the Radio" (2026)	"Shabang" (2026)

Music video
- "Janice STFU" on YouTube

"Janice STFU" is a song by Canadian rapper Drake. It was initially released on May 15, 2026, as the fourth track on his studio album Iceman. It was serviced to American rhythmic contemporary radio alongside on May 19, 2026, as the album's second single. The song debuted at number one on the US Billboard Hot 100, the Canadian Hot 100, and the Billboard Global 200, with the former chart debut allowing Drake to break Michael Jackson's record for overall number one US hits for a male solo artist. It was Drake's first song to top the Billboard Hot 100 for multiple weeks since his 2018 track "In My Feelings". The song was produced by FnZ, B4U and Rogét Chahayed, and its chorus interpolates the 2011 single "I Follow Rivers" by Swedish singer Lykke Li.

== Background and promotion ==
Drake first previewed an early version of the song during his third livestream to promote Iceman on September 4, 2025, which was then titled "That's Just How I Feel". It was repurposed into "Janice STFU" for the album release.

Drake previously sampled Lykke Li's song "Little Bit" for a song of the same name from his mixtape So Far Gone (2009), with Li credited as a featured artist. When co-writer Rick Nowels texted her about Drake's request to sample "I Follow Rivers", she initially thought he was trolling. In an interview with Rolling Stone after the release of Iceman, Li expressed fondness for Drake's earlier songs "Marvins Room" and "Hotline Bling". The instrumental originated in a March 2026 session between American producer Rogét Chahayed and Australian duo FnZ. British producer B4U added finishing touches to the instrumental. The character Janice Soprano from the HBO series The Sopranos inspired the song's title.

Drake hosted "apology parties" for people named Janice in New York City, Los Angeles, Toronto, Miami and Houston on June 28, 2026.

== Composition and lyrics ==
"Janice STFU" is a melodic hip-hop song. In the song, Drake interpolates the chorus of "I Follow Rivers" and heavily uses Auto-Tune. He criticizes the negative gossip and comments surrounding his career following the escalation of his feud with Kendrick Lamar in 2024. Drake notably directs criticism toward Lamar, accusing him of inauthenticity in his actions and appealing to "white kids" listening to his music out of, a phenomenon also termed "white guilt". He ends several lines which address Lamar with the words "for real". Besides Lamar, Drake takes a shot at rapper Jay-Z.

== Reception ==
Armon Sadler of Billboard ranked "Janice STFU" as the 11th best song from Iceman. Alexis Petridis of The Guardian considered the song "filler" and one of the "underwhelming" aspects of the album, commenting that it "lazily" interpolates "I Follow Rivers". Reviewing the album for Rolling Stone, Jeff Ihaza cited it as among the songs in which Drake "offers up the requisite earworm", writing that it "finds a new sonic texture in his delivery". The Fader named the song one of its 16 picks for the song of the summer of 2026. The chorus went viral on TikTok.Lykke Li said of the song, "I think it's potent. It has that raw, revenge, hip-hop energy." Several notable figures have also publicly praised the song, such as Zohran Mamdani, O'Shea Jackson Jr. and Timbaland. In contrast, during the Roots Picnic festival Jay-Z responded to the song's subliminals with a three-minute freestyle. Steffanee Wang of The Fader labeled “Janice STFU” as the song of summer 2026, writing how the “label-executive diss” turned into a groovy “melancholic Unc anthem”. On May 30, 2026, at the Roots Picnic, Jay-Z performed a freestyle that HotNewHipHop interpreted as a response to the song.

== Charts ==
=== Weekly charts ===
Weekly chart performance
Chart (2026)	Peak position
Australia (ARIA)	5
Australia Hip Hop/R&B (ARIA)	2
Austria (Ö3 Austria Top 40)	22
Canada Hot 100 (Billboard)	1
Canada CHR/Top 40 (Billboard)	25
Costa Rica Anglo Airplay (Monitor Latino)	12
Croatia (Billboard)	23
Denmark (Tracklisten)	20
Dominican Republic Anglo Airplay (Monitor Latino)	10
France (SNEP)	65
Germany (GfK)	25
Global 200 (Billboard)	1
Greece International (IFPI)	4
Iceland (Billboard)	1
India International (IMI)	3
Ireland (IRMA)	5
Israel (Mako Hitlist)	78
Italy (FIMI)	82
Latvia Streaming (LaIPA)	4
Lebanon (Lebanese Top 20)	8
Lithuania (AGATA)	25
Luxembourg (Billboard)	5
Middle East and North Africa (IFPI)	2
Netherlands (Single Top 100)	21
New Zealand (Recorded Music NZ)	5
North Africa (IFPI)	5
Nigeria (TurnTable Top 100)	43
Nigeria Airplay (TurnTable)	34
Norway (VG-lista)	25
Panama Anglo Airplay (Monitor Latino)	11
Portugal (AFP)	3
Romania (Billboard)	22
Saudi Arabia (IFPI)	5
Slovakia Singles Digital (ČNS IFPI)	34
South Africa Streaming (TOSAC)	1
Suriname (Nationale Top 40)	10
Sweden (Sverigetopplistan)	12
Switzerland (Schweizer Hitparade)	5
United Arab Emirates (IFPI)	1
UK Singles (Official Charts)	2
UK Hip Hop/R&B (Official Charts)	1
US Billboard Hot 100	1
US Hot R&B/Hip-Hop Songs (Billboard)	1
US Rhythmic Airplay (Billboard)	1

=== Monthly charts ===
Monthly chart performance
Chart (2026)	Peak position
South Africa Streaming (TOSAC)	2

== Certifications ==
Certifications for "Janice STFU"
Region	Certification	Certified units/sales
Portugal (AFP)	Gold	12,000^{‡}
^{‡} Sales+streaming figures based on certification alone.
