= Make Them Cry =

Song by Drake

from the album Iceman
- Released: May 15, 2026
- Genre: Hip-hop
- Length: 5:07
- Label: OVO; Republic
- Songwriters: Aubrey Graham; Akash Lakhani; Boi Yanel; Maneesh Bidaye; Manny Manhattan; Octavian Oliver Godji; Roger Ridley
- Producers: Boi Yanel; Maneesh; Manny Manhattan; O Lil Angel; Skeyez

Audio video
- "Make Them Cry" on YouTube

"Make Them Cry" is a song by Canadian rapper Drake from his studio album, Iceman. It was released on May 15, 2026, through OVO Sound and Republic Records, as the album's opening track.

== Background and composition ==
Ahead of its release, Drake first teased "Make Them Cry" on May 11, 2026, via a cryptic Instagram Story showing the song title in white font on a blue background, mirroring the teaser for "What Did I Miss?" (2025).

Described as a "slower, reflective track", it introduces themes of "betrayal" and isolation and establishes the tone for the rest of the album. It includes references to the artist's hometown, Toronto, as well as to his feud with American rapper Kendrick Lamar. He further compared discussions surrounding the feud and his music to the television series Twin Peaks. In the song, Drake also reveals that his father, Dennis Graham, has been diagnosed with an undisclosed form of cancer. Besides the news regarding his father, he reflects on family matters, referencing being an only child and caring for his parents in the present day.

Another reference in the song is to the South Korean boy band BTS. In response to the shoutout, member V shared a video on his Instagram Stories showing the group reacting to the lyric, including them listening to "Make Them Cry" and exchanging looks afterward.

== Critical reception ==
"Make Them Cry" received generally positive reviews from music critics. Jeff Ihaza of Rolling Stone described the song as presenting Drake in an "introspective, personal mood", setting the tone for the rest of the album. Joe Simpson of Clash praised the song for its "refreshing moments of vulnerability", evoking his earlier career.

== Charts ==
Chart performance for "Make Them Cry"
| Chart (2026) | Peak position |
|---|---|
| Australia (ARIA) | 9 |
| Australia Hip Hop/R&B (ARIA) | 4 |
| Canada Hot 100 (Billboard) | 7 |
| Denmark (Tracklisten) | 23 |
| Finland (Suomen virallinen lista) | 50 |
| France (SNEP) | 109 |
| Germany (GfK) | 74 |
| Global 200 (Billboard) | 6 |
| Greece International (IFPI) | 10 |
| Iceland (Billboard) | 9 |
| India International (IMI) | 15 |
| Ireland (IRMA) | 10 |
| Italy (FIMI) | 100 |
| Latvia Streaming (LaIPA) | 14 |
| Lithuania (AGATA) | 40 |
| Luxembourg (Billboard) | 12 |
| Middle East and North Africa (IFPI) | 10 |
| New Zealand (Recorded Music NZ) | 13 |
| Nigeria (TurnTable Top 100) | 58 |
| North Africa (IFPI) | 17 |
| Norway (VG-lista) | 44 |
| Portugal (AFP) | 5 |
| Saudi Arabia (IFPI) | 18 |
| Slovakia Singles Digital (ČNS IFPI) | 63 |
| South Africa Streaming (TOSAC) | 3 |
| Sweden (Sverigetopplistan) | 21 |
| United Arab Emirates (IFPI) | 7 |
| UK Singles (Official Charts) | 6 |
| UK Hip Hop/R&B (Official Charts) | 3 |
| US Billboard Hot 100 | 7 |
| US Hot R&B/Hip-Hop Songs (Billboard) | 6 |
