= The Official South African Charts =

South African record charts

- Formation: 2 September 2021; 5 years ago
- Founded at: Johannesburg, South Africa
- Parent organization: Recording Industry of South Africa
- Website: theofficialsacharts.co.za

The Official South African Charts (TOSAC) is the music industry standard record chart in South Africa launched by RISA for local and international songs. Chart rankings are based on digital sales and online streaming in South Africa through iTunes, Spotify, Apple Music, and Deezer. The charts were launched in South Africa on 1 September 2021, becoming the only South African chart to focus on songs on digital music streaming services. The first official number-one hit on the chart was Ed Sheeran's "Bad Habits".

== History ==
The South African Broadcasting Corporation compiled the album sales chart from the end of 1981 to 1995, and the singles sales chart from 1958 to 1989 when singles stopped being manufactured.

Later, music charts in South Africa were initially presented by Entertainment Monitoring Africa, based on radio airplay only, however the company became defunct in late 2016. The Recording Industry of South Africa later announced plans to launch a South African chart, citing the robust music industry in the country, particularly due to the shift in how people consume music in recent years through digital media, with more South African audiences making use of streaming. The chart launched in September, 2021, featuring a local and international top 100, and a separate local top 100 which encompasses South African artists only. Charts on the platform include the Weekly Top 200 Tracks, which takes into account all tracks streamed in South Africa. The chart week runs from Friday to Thursday and only digital streaming figures are taken into account.

== Chart synopsis ==
The chart aggregates data from Spotify, Apple Music and Deezer, and data is aggregated by Barcelona headquartered BMAT. Spotify launched in South Africa in 2018, whereas Apple Music and Deezer have been available since 2015 and 2013, respectively. Charts on the platform run a weekly Top 200 Tracks, which takes under consideration all songs streamed in South Africa, together with each native and international music. The weekly High 100 Native ZA solely includes songs whereby at the very least one of many credited artists is from South Africa. Chart weeks run from Friday to Thursday and only digital streaming numbers are taken into account. The number of streams shown in the charts is always weighted, so that subscription streams have more relevance than ad-funded streams. Currently, no track exclusion policy or accelerated decline method is being applied (this refers to songs being removed if their streams decline). Different versions of a song are aggregated to their corresponding original song, which include the same song with additional featuring artists, DJs remixes, as long as the original artist is credited and different language/country versions.

== Chart records ==
=== Artists with the most simultaneous song debuts on the Local & International Streaming chart ===
Number of songs	Artist	Date	Song (chart position)	Ref.
27	Kanye West	2 September 2021	"Hurricane" (1), "Jail" (2), "Praise God" (4), Off the Grid" (5), "Moon" (9), "Jonah" (10), "God Breathed" (11), "Ok Ok" (12), "Lord I Need You" (13), "24" (14), "No Child Left Behind" (15), "Junya" (16), "Believe What I Say" (17), "Remote Control" (20), "Jesus Lord" (21), "Heaven and Hell" (22), "Donda" (24), "Keep My Spirit Alive" (25), "Pure Souls" (26), "New Again" (28), "Donda Chant" (30), "Tell the Vision" (33), "Come to Life" (36), "Ok Ok pt 2" (40), "Jail pt 2" (41), "Jesus Lord pt 2" (45), "Junya pt 2" (47)	
20	Summer Walker	18 November 2021	"No Love" (9), "Bitter" (16), "Reciprocate" (23), "Throw It Away" (24), "Unloyal" (26), "Ex for a Reason" (27), "You Don't Know Me" (29), "Insane" (30), "Constant Bullshit" (33), "Toxic" (35), "Circus" (36), "Closure" (37), "Switch a Nigga Out" (39), "4th Baby Mama" (44), "Ciara's Prayer" (46), "Session 33" (48), "Broken Promises" (64), "Dat Right There" (67), "Screwin" (70), "4th Baby Mama (Prelude)" (93)	
18	Drake	24 May 2026	"Janice STFU" (1), "Shabang" (2), "Make Them Cry" (3), "Whisper My Name" (4), "Ran to Atlanta" (5), "National Treasures" (6), "Dust" (7), "Make Them Pay" (8), "Plot Twist" (9), B's on the Table" (10), "Burning Bridges" (11), "2 Hard 4 the Radio" (12), "Make Them Know" (14), "Make Them Remember" (15), "Fortworth" (16), "Little Birdie" (17), "Don't Worry" (18), "Firm Friends" (19)	
16	Beyoncé	11 August 2022	"Alien Superstar" (2), "Break My Soul" (4), "Cuff It" (5), "I'm That Girl" (7), "Energy" (8), "Church Girl" (10), "Cozy" (11), "Plastic Off the Sofa" (18), "Virgo's Groove" (25), "Heated" (26), "Move" (32), "Thique" (40), "Pure/Honey" (47), "All Up in Your Mind" (50), "America Has a Problem" (53), "Summer Renaissance" (60)	
12	Taylor Swift	17 October 2025	—N/a	
11	Adele	2 December 2021	"My Little Love" (6), "I Drink Wine" (8), "Oh My God" (9), "To Be Loved" (10), "Strangers By Nature" (11), "Cry Your Heart Out" (12), "Hold On" (14), "Can I Get It" (15), "Woman Like Me" (17), "All Night Parking (with Erroll Garner) Interlude" (18), "Love Is A Game" (22)	
9	Drake	18 November 2022	"Rich Flex" (1), "Major Distribution" (2), "On BS" (3), "Privileged Rappers" (4), "BackOutsideBoyz" (5), "Spin Bout U" (7), "Pussy & Millions" (8), "Circo Loco" (9), "Hours in Silence" (10)	
9	Young Thug	28 October 2021	"Bubbly" (with Drake & Travis Scott) (17), "Stressed" (Feat J. Cole & T-Shyne) (41), "Die Slow" (with Strick) (64), "Livin It Up" (with Post Malone & A$AP Rocky) (69), "Recognize Real" (with Gunna) (78), "Stupid/Asking" (81), "Peepin Out the Window" (with Future & Bslime) (82), "Love You More" (with Nate Ruess, Gunna & Jeff Bhasker) (91), "Contagious" (99)	
9	Young Stunna	4 November 2021	"Adiwele" (feat. Kabza De Small & DJ Maphorisa) (1), "Sithi Shwi" (feat. Big Zulu, DJ Maphorisa & Kabza De Small) (16), "We Mame" (feat. Madumane & Kabza De Small) (23), "Shenta" (feat. Nkulee 501 & Skroef28) (25), "Bayeke" (feat. Daliwonga, Mellow & Sleazy) (36), "Camagu" (feat. Kabza De Small) (42), "Shaka Zulu" (feat. Kabza De Small & Black Motion) (50), "S'thini Istory" (feat. Visca) (51), "Ethembeni" (feat. Kabza De Small) (81)	
8	21 Savage	18 November 2022	"Rich Flex" (1), "Major Distribution" (2), "On BS" (3), "Privileged Rappers" (4), "Spin Bout U" (7), "Pussy & Millions" (8), "Circo Loco" (9), "Hours in Silence" (10)	
7	Adele	28 October 2021	"Easy on Me" (1), "When We Were Young" (42), "Someone like You" (55), "Rolling in the Deep" (77), "Send My Love (To Your New Lover)" (90), "Hello" (95), "Set Fire to the Rain" (98)	
4	Taylor Swift	25 November 2021	"All Too Well (Taylor's Version)" (13), "State of Grace (Taylor's Version)" (77), "Red (Taylor's Version)" (78), "I Knew You Were Trouble (Taylor's Version)" (92)	
4	Taylor Swift	9 October 2026	"Patient Zero" (18), "Babylon" (74), "Pink Clouding" (89), "Cleveland!" (91)	
3	Ed Sheeran	11 November 2021	"Overpass Graffiti" (26), "First Times" (64), "Tides" (83)	
3	Kanye West, Ty Dolla Sign	22 February 2024	"Carnival" (8), "Stars" (12), "Back to Me" (17)	
