= Molly Santana =

American rapper, singer and songwriter (born 2004)

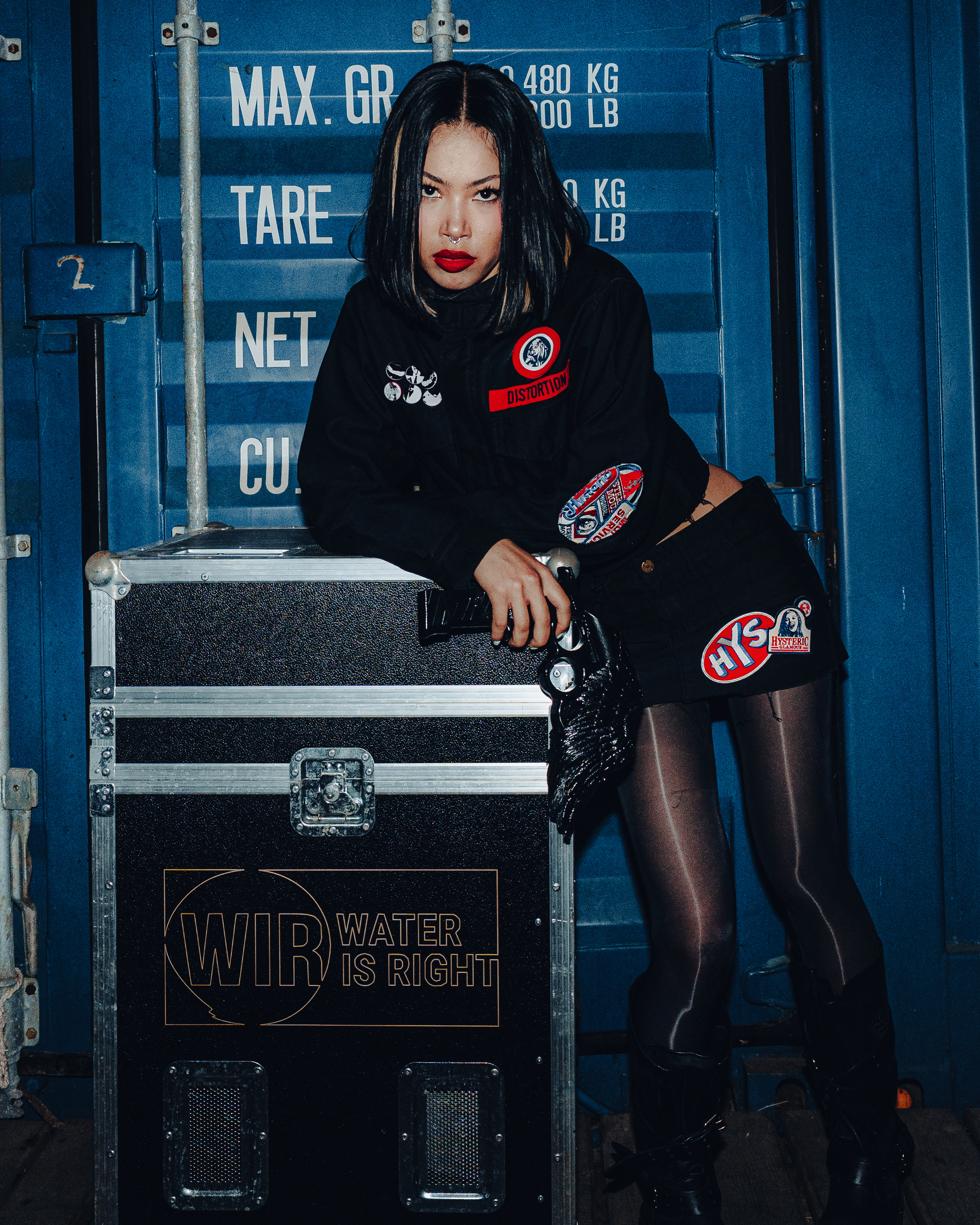
- Santana in 2026

Background information
- Born: October 10, 2004 (age 22)
- Origin: Fontana, California, U.S.
- Genres: Trap; pop rap; rage
- Occupations: Rapper; singer; songwriter
- Years active: 2021–present
- Labels: Victor Victor; Capitol; Epic; Black Punk
- Website: mollyandherweekofwonders.com

Mya Parks, known professionally as Molly Santana, is an American rapper, singer, and songwriter. She is best known for her guest appearance alongside Future on Drake's 2026 song "Ran to Atlanta", which peaked at number two on the Billboard Hot 100.

== Early life ==
Mya Parks was born on October 10th, 2004. She is of Japanese and African American ancestry, and grew up in Fontana, California. When she was 11 years old, she taught herself to play My Chemical Romance and Pierce The Veil songs on acoustic guitar, and later electric guitar and bass. She also saw various punk bands at The Smell in Los Angeles. Santana initially garnered attention online as a fashion influencer in 2019, and initially studied fashion in Japan before dropping out to pursue music full-time.

== Career ==
Santana recorded her first song in her car using Apple headphones as a microphone. In 2021, Santana released her debut single "Y They Talk Abt Me?". Her four-song debut extended play, Molly's World, was released in October 2021, and was followed by Neptune (2022) and Mélange (2023).

In April 2024, Santana released her 14-song eponymous debut studio album. Following its release, she toured as a supporting act for Ski Mask the Slump God and embarked on her own headlining tour. In September 2024, Santana released the six-song Masonic Musik EP, which marked her first release with Victor Victor Worldwide and Capitol Records. It was preceded by the single "Windows Up", which was listed as one of the best rap songs of 2024 by The Fader. Thereafter, she opened for Don Toliver on his Hardstone Psycho Tour of North America, and made her debut Rolling Loud performance in Miami, Florida. In December 2024, she released Self-Titled Files, an EP of outtakes from her debut album, on SoundCloud and teased a new album. The album, titled Molly and Her Week of Wonders, was released on May 30, 2025. Santana embarked on a headlining tour of North America in support of it between July and August.

In 2026, she was featured on rapper Drake's ninth studio album Iceman, alongside Future on the song "Ran to Atlanta". She was scheduled to embark on the "Molly x North Kimokawaii Tour" with North West in August 2026, but the tour was canceled a few days prior to its first show. In November 2026, Santana signed to Epic Records through her imprint label Black Punk Music. and released her third studio album Black Punk on November 27, 2026.

== Style and influences ==
Santana's musical style has been described as trap, pop rap, and rage. According to Cydney Lee of Pigeons and Planes, her style features influences from punk music, rage, trap, and "alt-pop". Complex highlighted her baritone voice and grunge and punk-influenced aesthetics. She cites ASAP Rocky, Bladee, Black Kray, Chief Keef, Ecco2k, Nettspend, Erykah Badu, Lady Gaga, Lil Uzi Vert, Playboi Carti, Rihanna, the Smashing Pumpkins, Tyler, the Creator, Young Thug,, Yung Lean, Paramore, and Pierce The Veil as influences.

== Discography ==
=== Studio albums ===
List of studio albums, with selected details
Title	Album details
Molly Santana	Released: April 26, 2024; Label: Self-released; Format: Digital download, streaming
Molly and Her Week of Wonders	Released: May 30, 2025; Label: Victor Victor; Format: Digital download, streaming
Black Punk	Released: November 27, 2026; Label: Epic, Black Punk Music; Format: Digital download, streaming

=== Extended plays ===
List of EPs, with selected details
Title	EP details
Molly's World	Released: October 10, 2021; Label: Self-released; Format: Digital download, streaming
Neptune	Released: November 25, 2022; Label: Self-released; Format: Digital download, streaming
Mélange	Released: May 26, 2023; Label: Self-released; Format: Digital download, streaming
Masonic Musik	Released: September 13, 2024; Label: Victor Victor, Capitol; Format: Digital download, streaming
Self-Titled Files	Released: December 30, 2024; Label: Self-released; Format: Streaming

=== Singles ===
Title	Year	Album(s)
"Y They Talk Abt Me?"	2021	Non-album single
"Mason Musik"	2022	Non-album single
"Blatt"	2023	Mélange
"Girls Just Wanna Have Fun"	2023	Non-album single
"No Mass"	2023	Non-album single
"Wreckit"	2023	Non-album single
"Red Dot"	2023	Non-album single
"Amnesia"	2023	Non-album single
"Black Ops"	2024	Molly Santana
"Chain Swangin"	2024	Molly Santana
"Windows Up"	2024	Masonic Musik
"2 Rich"	2025	Non-album single
"Not Regular"	2025	Molly and Her Week of Wonders
"Solo"	2026	Non-album single
"Can't Touch This"	2026	Non-album single
"Walk" (with Chy Cartier)	2026	Non-album single
"Live Your Life"	2026	Black Punk
"A Girl Is A Gun"	2026	Black Punk

=== Other charted songs ===
Title	Year	Peak chart positions								Album
Title	Year	US	US R&B/HH	AUS	CAN	DEN	NZ	SWE	WW	Album
"Ran to Atlanta" (with Drake and Future)	2026	2	2	11	2	33	14	31	2	Iceman
