= National Treasures (song) =

Song by Drake

from the album Iceman
- Released: May 15, 2026
- Length: 3:20
- Label: OVO; Republic
- Producers: Boi-1da; Oz; London Cyr; Nico Baran; Patron; Ben10k; Ryan Bakalarczyk; Wraith9

Music video
- National Treasures on YouTube

"National Treasures" is a song by Canadian rapper Drake released on May 15, 2026 as part of his album Iceman.

== Background ==
In the lead-up to the release of Iceman, fans spread Internet memes about a hypothetical title track featuring lyrics that rhyme the word "Iceman" with "nice man", as well as lines such as "I'll cook some rice, man". Unexpectedly, "National Treasures" did contain the humorous rhyme: "Ironic 'cause the Iceman was a nice man, now I'm hot and cold." Complex speculated that the lyric may be inspired by the meme.

== Composition ==
The production consists of "eerie" synths and trap-inspired beats, before transitioning to sampled voices and industrial sounds midway through the song. Drake takes shots at basketball player DeMar DeRozan, subtly noting that he has never made it to the NBA Finals and comparing it to Kawhi Leonard winning a championship within a year of joining the Toronto Raptors.

== Music video ==
The track's music video was filmed at the Andrews Building on the University of Toronto's Scarborough campus in Toronto. The video was released on May 14, 2026.

== Critical reception ==
Armon Sadler of Billboard ranked "National Treasures" as the third best song from Iceman.

== Charts ==
Chart performance for "National Treasures"
Chart (2026)	Peak position
Australia (ARIA)	4
Australia Hip Hop/R&B (ARIA)	1
Austria (Ö3 Austria Top 40)	30
Canada Hot 100 (Billboard)	3
Croatia (Billboard)	21
Denmark (Tracklisten)	14
Germany (GfK)	33
Global 200 (Billboard)	4
Greece International (IFPI)	3
Iceland (Billboard)	2
India International (IMI)	9
Ireland (IRMA)	3
Israel (Mako Hitlist)	89
Italy (FIMI)	81
Latvia Streaming (LaIPA)	5
Lithuania (AGATA)	17
Luxembourg (Billboard)	7
Middle East and North Africa (IFPI)	3
Netherlands (Single Top 100)	16
New Zealand (Recorded Music NZ)	4
Nigeria (TurnTable Top 100)	89
North Africa (IFPI)	12
Norway (IFPI Norge)	30
Panama Streaming (PRODUCE)	107
Portugal (AFP)	2
Romania (Billboard)	16
Saudi Arabia (IFPI)	6
South Africa Streaming (TOSAC)	5
Sweden (Sverigetopplistan)	12
United Arab Emirates (IFPI)	2
UK Singles (Official Charts)	3
UK Hip Hop/R&B (Official Charts)	2
US Billboard Hot 100	6
US Hot R&B/Hip-Hop Songs (Billboard)	5
