= Shabang =

2026 single by Drake

Single by Drake

from the album Iceman
- Released: June 16, 2026
- Genre: Hip-hop
- Length: 3:08
- Label: OVO; Republic
- Songwriters: Aubrey Graham; Maneesh Bidaye; Noah Shebib; Octavian Godji; Ozan Yıldırım
- Producers: Maneesh; 40; O Lil Angel; Oz

Drake singles chronology
"Janice STFU" / "2 Hard 4 the Radio" (2026)	"Shabang" (2026)	"No Brakes" (2026)

Music video
- "Shabang" on YouTube

"Shabang" is a song by Canadian rapper Drake, released on May 15, 2026, as the sixth track on his studio album Iceman through OVO Sound and Republic Records. On June 16, 2026, it was serviced to rhythmic contemporary radio stations in the U.S. Produced by Maneesh, 40, O Lil Angel and Oz, the track features ad-libs from Migos rappers Quavo and Takeoff and contains references to rapper 21 Savage and singer Bryson Tiller. The song received generally positive critical reception, with several publications naming it among the standout tracks on Iceman and multiple artists and critics citing it as a song of the summer. Commercially, "Shabang" peaked at number four on the Billboard Hot 100 and number two on the Hot R&B/Hip-Hop Songs chart in the United States, while also reaching the top five in Canada and on the Billboard Global 200. The song inspired a viral social media challenge and was accompanied by an official music video filmed at Downsview Park in Toronto, which drew considerable media coverage after a large controlled explosion staged for the shoot alarmed local residents.

== Background ==
"Shabang" appears on Iceman, the first instalment of a studio album trilogy Drake released simultaneously on May 15, 2026, alongside Habibti and Maid of Honour. All three projects were released through OVO Sound and Republic Records. On the day of the album's release, Drake unveiled a wave of official music videos in what Complex described as a "visual onslaught", including clips for "Janice STFU" and "Ran to Atlanta" alongside the video for "Shabang". The music video had been filmed approximately one month earlier, on the evening of April 16, 2026, at Downsview Park in North York, Toronto.

== Composition ==
"Shabang" features Drake delivering a boastful, taunting performance directed at his rivals. The lyrics contain references to rapper 21 Savage and singer Bryson Tiller. The track features ad-libs from rappers Takeoff and Quavo of the American hip-hop group Migos, as well as Young Jonii. Critics described the song as operating in Drake's more accessible, dance-floor-oriented mode: GQ called it "a swaggering anthem you can already hear a dancefloor full of bros in suit vests shouting along to" and suggested it would have been the most "conventional" pick for a lead single from Iceman, while Rolling Stone wrote that it "lands squarely in the joyous realm of the kind of hits he used to deliver with ease."

== Critical reception ==
"Shabang" received generally positive reviews from music critics. Jeff Ihaza of Rolling Stone wrote that it "lands squarely in the joyous realm of the kind of hits he used to deliver with ease." Abe Beame of GQ characterized it as "a swaggering anthem" and the most naturally commercial track on the album, suggesting it was the obvious choice for a lead single. Armon Sadler of Billboard ranked it 13th of the 18 tracks on Iceman, describing Quavo's ad-libs as "refreshing" and his contribution as "the icing on the cake for a solid record."

The song attracted widespread recognition as a song of the summer. Rapper Offset and singer Leon Thomas both named it their song of the summer. Abie Niedzwiecki of The Fader and Mano Sundaresan of Pitchfork included the song in their respective publication's 2026 song of the summer lists.

== Commercial performance ==
"Shabang" debuted and peaked at number 4 on the Billboard Hot 100 following the release of Iceman on May 15, 2026. It reached number two on the Hot R&B/Hip-Hop Songs chart. In Canada, it peaked at number five on the Canadian Hot 100, and reached the same position globally on the Billboard Global 200 chart.

Internationally, the song charted in numerous territories, peaking at number nine in New Zealand, number 13 on the ARIA Singles Chart in Australia, number seven on the Australian Hip Hop/R&B chart, and number two on the South Africa Streaming chart. The song also appeared on charts in France, Germany, Greece, Iceland, India, Ireland, Luxembourg, the Middle East and North Africa, Nigeria, Norway, Slovakia, Sweden, and the United Arab Emirates.

== Music video ==
The explosion at Downsview Park in the "Shabang" music video.

The official music video for "Shabang" was released on May 15, 2026, on the day of the album's release. It centers on a large-scale controlled explosion, with Drake's silhouette appearing against the blast; footage of the explosion constitutes the majority of the video's runtime.

The explosion was filmed on the evening of April 16, 2026, at Downsview Park in North York, Toronto. The production was permitted by the City of Toronto under the codename "Project Bot"; a Special Effects (SPFX) permit was issued, and both Toronto Fire Services and Toronto Police Service were engaged in advance of the shoot.

Downsview Park had issued advance notice on its website and social media channels, warning of planned pyrotechnic effects during the week of April 13 and advising that nearby residents might experience loud noises, flashes of light, and smoke. Nonetheless, many residents who had not seen the notice were alarmed. Ward 6 councillor James Pasternak told CP24 that residents were "shocked out of their beds" as a mushroom cloud rose over the neighbourhood, and subsequently brought a motion before Toronto City Council regarding the incident. CBC News reported that the episode raised broader concerns about the adequacy of public communication surrounding permitted pyrotechnic events in residential areas.

== Viral trend ==
"Shabang" inspired a viral social media challenge in which participants use video editing techniques to make beverages and other objects appear to materialize spontaneously in sync with Drake's verses. Several celebrities participated in the challenge, including Summer Walker, Idris Elba, and Stunna Sandy.

== Remixes and covers ==
In late May 2026, a mashup combining "Shabang" with the nursery rhyme "Hickory Dickory Dock" was released and quickly gained widespread attention online.

On July 22, 2026, King Willonius, a parody musical artist who incorporates AI tools, released a musical-theater-imagining of "Shabang", called "Shabang The Musical." This was not Willonius' first interaction with Drake, as Willonius is also known for creating the original "BBL Drizzy", which was sampled in Metro Boomin's track with the same name, which was released during the Kendrick Drake feud.

== Personnel ==
- Drake – lead vocals
- Takeoff – ad-libs
- Quavo – ad-libs
- Maneesh – producer

== Charts ==
=== Weekly charts ===
Weekly chart performance
Chart (2026)	Peak position
Australia (ARIA)	13
Australia Hip Hop/R&B (ARIA)	7
Canada Hot 100 (Billboard)	4
France (SNEP)	152
Germany (GfK)	96
Global 200 (Billboard)	5
Greece International (IFPI)	19
Iceland (Billboard)	18
India International (IMI)	19
Ireland (IRMA)	80
Luxembourg (Billboard)	17
Middle East and North Africa (IFPI)	11
New Zealand (Recorded Music NZ)	9
Nigeria (TurnTable Top 100)	47
Nigeria Airplay (TurnTable)	22
Norway (VG-lista)	79
Slovakia Singles Digital (ČNS IFPI)	100
South Africa Streaming (TOSAC)	2
Sweden (Sverigetopplistan)	43
UK Singles (Official Charts)	25
United Arab Emirates (IFPI)	9
US Billboard Hot 100	4
US Hot R&B/Hip-Hop Songs (Billboard)	2
US Rhythmic Airplay (Billboard)	1

=== Monthly charts ===
Monthly chart performance
Chart (2026)	Peak position
South Africa Streaming (TOSAC)	4

== Release history ==
Release dates and formats
Region	Date	Format	Label	Ref.
United States	June 16, 2026	Rhythmic crossover	Republic	
