= Would You Like a Tour? =

2013–2015 concert tour by Drake

- Tour by Drake
- Location: North America • Europe • Oceania
- Associated album: Nothing Was the Same
- Start date: October 18, 2013
- End date: March 5, 2015
- Legs: 3
- No. of shows: 66
- Box office: $46.2 million (57 shows) ($62.75 million in 2025 dollars)

Drake concert chronology
- Club Paradise Tour (2012); Would You Like a Tour? (2013–15); Summer Sixteen Tour (2016)

Would You Like a Tour? was the third headlining tour by Canadian rapper Drake. It began on October 18, 2013 in Pittsburgh and continued until March 5, 2015 with its final show scheduled in Brisbane, Australia. Scheduled for 66 performances across North America, Europe, and Oceania, the tour was produced by Live Nation in conjunction with his third studio album, Nothing Was the Same.

The tour would begin two months after the fourth annual OVO Festival in Toronto, and featured various opening acts across the different legs of the tour, including Future, Miguel, Jhené Aiko, PARTYNEXTDOOR and The Weeknd. Most of the track-list from Nothing Was the Same was performed, such as singles "Hold On, We're Going Home", "Started from the Bottom", and "Worst Behavior". Additional singles where Drake and the opening act had collaborated on were also performed, including "If Only They Knew", "Crew Love", and "Fo Real".

It would gross over $46,200,000 throughout its duration, making it one of the highest grossing hip-hop tours of all time.

== Background ==
Drake would hint an impending tour, tweeting "Would You Like a Tour?" on June 13, 2013. Later that week, Drake would confirm the tour, announcing that the "Would You Like A Tour?" was set to feature in over 38 stadiums and arenas across the United States and Canada. The tour was scheduled to begin on October 18 in Pittsburgh, and conclude on December 18 in Philadelphia. The "Would You Like a Tour?" concert tour was in support of Drake's third studio album, Nothing Was the Same.

On October 15, 2013, it was reported that Future had been removed from the tour due to disparaging comments made by him towards Drake during a Billboard interview. It was rumored that Future was demanding $1.5 million for lost wages, owing to a reported $40,000 guaranteed payout per gig. Despite this, it was later revealed, however, that Future was not removed from the tour, with Drake confirming that the rapper would remain on the tour. He would later announce that PARTYNEXTDOOR would also be featured on the tour. On October 29, the tour would be extended to a European leg, with The Weeknd performing as the opening act.

== Opening acts ==
- Miguel
- Future
- The Weeknd (Europe)
- PARTYNEXTDOOR
- Jhené Aiko
- 2 Chainz
- J. Cole
- Lil Wayne

== Set list ==
1. "Tuscan Leather" (First verse)
2. "Headlines"
3. "Crew Love"
4. "Tuscan Leather" (Third verse)
5. "Furthest Thing"
6. "Wu-Tang Forever"
7. "Own It"
8. "Pop That"
9. "No New Friends"
10. "Love Me" (with Future)
11. "Honest" (with Future)
12. "Same Damn Time" (with Future)
13. "Fuckin' Problems"
14. "The Motto"
15. "Versace"
16. "HYFR (Hell Ya Fucking Right)"
17. "The Motion"
18. "Come Thru"
19. "From Time"
20. "Hold On, We're Going Home"
21. "Connect"
22. "Too Much"
23. "Pound Cake"
24. "Worst Behavior"
25. "The Language"
26. "305 To My City"
27. "All Me"
28. "Started from the Bottom"

Notes

- Drake performed "Black and Yellow" with Wiz Khalifa at the show in Pittsburgh, Pennsylvania.
- Drake performed "Put Your Hands Where My Eyes Can See" with Busta Rhymes at the show in Brooklyn, New York. And he also performed "Work", "Shabba" and "Fuckin' Problems with the A$AP Mob at the same show.
- Drake performed "HYFR (Hell Ya Fucking Right)" & "Rich As Fuck" with Lil Wayne at the show in Miami, Florida.
- Drake performed "Back That Azz Up" with Juvenile at the show in Dallas, Texas.
- Drake performed "November 18th" at the show in Houston, Texas.
- Drake performed "The Next Episode", "Nuthin' but a 'G' Thang" and "Drop It Like It's Hot" with Snoop Dogg at the show in Los Angeles, California. He would also perform Make Me Proud with Nicki Minaj and Still Fly with Birdman at the show.
- Drake performed "Worst Behavior" and brought out his father, Dennis Graham, at the show in St. Louis, Missouri.
- Drake performed "All Me" with Big Sean at the show in Auburn Hills, Michigan.
- Drake performed "Dreams & Nightmares Intro" and "Levels" with Meek Mill at the show in Philadelphia, Pennsylvania. Drake would also bring out Big Sean at the show, performing "All Me and Mercy.
- Drake performed "Take Care" with Rihanna at the show in Bercy, Paris. Rihanna also performed "Pour It Up".
- Drake would debut "Days in the East" during the second leg of the Birmingham, England shows.
- Drake performed "Black Skinhead" with Kanye West at the show in Berlin, Germany. "Trophies", "Best I Ever Had", "Take Care", "Over" and "Successful" would vary as a part of the set list in some shows.
- Drake performed "All Me" with 2 Chainz on all Australian dates.

== Tour dates ==
Date	City	Country	Venue
North America
October 18, 2013	Pittsburgh	United States	Consol Energy Center
October 21, 2013	Montreal	Canada	Bell Centre
October 22, 2013	Ottawa	Canada	Canadian Tire Centre
October 24, 2013	Toronto	Canada	Air Canada Centre
October 26, 2013	Hartford	United States	XL Center
October 27, 2013	Newark	United States	Prudential Center
October 28, 2013	Brooklyn	United States	Barclays Center
October 30, 2013	Boston	United States	TD Garden
October 31, 2013	Washington, D.C.	United States	Verizon Center
November 2, 2013	Charlotte	United States	Time Warner Cable Arena
November 5, 2013	Miami	United States	American Airlines Arena
November 6, 2013	Tampa	United States	Tampa Bay Times Forum
November 7, 2013	Atlanta	United States	Philips Arena
November 9, 2013	New Orleans	United States	New Orleans Arena
November 10, 2013	Dallas	United States	American Airlines Center
November 12, 2013	San Antonio	United States	AT&T Center
November 13, 2013	Houston	United States	Toyota Center
November 16, 2013	Phoenix	United States	Talking Stick Resort Arena
November 18, 2013	Sacramento	United States	Sleep Train Arena
November 19, 2013	Oakland	United States	Oracle Arena
November 21, 2013	Anaheim	United States	Honda Center
November 22, 2013	Las Vegas	United States	MGM Grand Garden Arena
November 24, 2013	San Diego	United States	Viejas Arena
November 25, 2013	Los Angeles	United States	Staples Center
November 28, 2013	Vancouver	Canada	Rogers Arena
November 30, 2013	Calgary	Canada	Scotiabank Saddledome
December 1, 2013	Edmonton	Canada	Rexall Place
December 3, 2013	Portland	United States	Moda Center
December 4, 2013	Tacoma	United States	Tacoma Dome
December 7, 2013	Kansas City	United States	Sprint Center
December 8, 2013	Minneapolis	United States	Target Center
December 9, 2013	Indianapolis	United States	Bankers Life Fieldhouse
December 11, 2013	St. Louis	United States	Scottrade Center
December 12, 2013	Chicago	United States	United Center
December 13, 2013	Columbus	United States	Nationwide Arena
December 15, 2013	Buffalo	United States	First Niagara Center
December 16, 2013	Auburn Hills	United States	The Palace of Auburn Hills
December 18, 2013	Philadelphia	United States	Wells Fargo Center
Europe
February 19, 2014	Frankfurt	Germany	Festhalle Frankfurt
February 21, 2014	Montpellier	France	Park&Suites Arena
February 24, 2014	Paris	France	Palais Omnisports de Paris-Bercy
February 25, 2014	Paris	France	Palais Omnisports de Paris-Bercy
February 27, 2014	Berlin	Germany	O_{2} World
March 1, 2014	Stockholm	Sweden	Ericsson Globe
March 2, 2014	Oslo	Norway	Oslo Spektrum
March 3, 2014	Copenhagen	Denmark	Forum Copenhagen
March 5, 2014	Amsterdam	Netherlands	Ziggo Dome
March 7, 2014	Oberhausen	Germany	König Pilsener Arena
March 8, 2014	Brussels	Belgium	Palais 12
March 11, 2014	Manchester	England	Phones 4u Arena
March 12, 2014	Manchester	England	Phones 4u Arena
March 14, 2014	Sheffield	England	Motorpoint Arena
March 15, 2014	Glasgow	Scotland	SSE Hydro
March 16, 2014	Nottingham	England	Capital FM Arena Nottingham
March 18, 2014	Dublin	Ireland	The O_{2}
March 20, 2014	Birmingham	England	National Indoor Arena
March 21, 2014	Birmingham	England	National Indoor Arena
March 22, 2014	Liverpool	England	Liverpool Echo Arena
March 24, 2014	London	England	The O_{2} Arena
March 25, 2014	London	England	The O_{2} Arena
March 26, 2014	London	England	The O_{2} Arena
Oceania
February 23, 2015	Auckland	New Zealand	Vector Arena
February 25, 2015	Sydney	Australia	Allphones Arena
February 27, 2015	Melbourne	Australia	Rod Laver Arena
March 3, 2015	Perth	Australia	Perth Arena
March 5, 2015	Brisbane	Australia	Brisbane Entertainment Centre

Cancellations and rescheduled shows

September 25, 2013	Portland, Oregon	Moda Center	Rescheduled to December 3, 2013.
September 26, 2013	Tacoma, Washington	Tacoma Dome	Rescheduled to December 4, 2013.
September 27, 2013	Vancouver, British Columbia	Rogers Arena	Rescheduled to November 28, 2013.
September 29, 2013	Calgary, Alberta	Scotiabank Saddledome	Rescheduled to November 30, 2013
September 30, 2013	Edmonton, Alberta	Rexall Place	Rescheduled to December 1, 2013.
October 2, 2013	Saskatoon, Saskatchewan	Credit Union Centre	Cancelled.
October 3, 2013	Winnipeg, Manitoba	MTS Centre	Cancelled.
October 5, 2013	Minneapolis, Minnesota	Target Center	Rescheduled to December 8, 2013.
October 6, 2013	Kansas City, Missouri	Sprint Center	Rescheduled to December 7, 2013.
October 8, 2013	St. Louis, Missouri	Scottrade Center	Rescheduled to December 11, 2013.
October 9, 2013	Chicago, Illinois	United Center	Rescheduled to December 12, 2013.
October 11, 2013	Indianapolis, Indiana	Bankers Life Fieldhouse	Rescheduled to December 9, 2013.
October 12, 2013	Auburn Hills, Michigan	The Palace of Auburn Hills	Rescheduled to December 16, 2013.
October 13, 2013	Cleveland, Ohio	Quicken Loans Arena	Cancelled.
October 15, 2013	Columbus, Ohio	Value City Arena	Rescheduled to December 13, 2013, and moved to the Nationwide Arena.
October 16, 2013	Buffalo, New York	First Niagara Center	Rescheduled to December 15, 2013.
October 19, 2013	Philadelphia	Wells Fargo Center	Rescheduled to December 18, 2013.

=== Box office score data ===
Venue	City	Tickets sold / Available	Gross revenue
Bell Center	Montreal	11,159 / 11,998 (93%)	$1,033,680
Air Canada Centre	Toronto	15,289 / 15,289 (100%)	$1,398,860
Prudential Center	Newark	12,705 / 12,705 (100%)	$1,135,688
Barclays Center	Brooklyn	14,287 / 14,287 (100%)	$1,323,508
Philips Arena	Atlanta	14,244 / 14,244 (100%)	$993,612
The O2 Arena	London	50,832 / 50,832 (100%)	$4,272,630
Phones 4U Arena	Manchester	25,445 / 29,320 (87%)	$1,882,140
Wells Fargo Center	Philadelphia	13,440 / 13,440 (100%)	$1,004,923
The O2	Dublin	9,891 / 11,200 (88%)	$833,696
Palace of Auburn Hills	Auburn Hills	12,036 / 15,261 (79%)	$627,635
Tacoma Dome	Tacoma	8,004 / 10,474 (76%)	$605,548
O2 World	Berlin	9,823 / 10,621 (92%)	$556,617
Target Center	Minneapolis	6,722 / 6,722 (100%)	$561,816
Staples Center	Los Angeles	14,896 / 14,896 (100%)	$1,302,766
Moda Center	Portland	6,404 / 9,419 (68%)	$564,629
Allphones Arena	Sydney	14,533 / 14,581 (99%)	$1,593,220
Perth Arena	Perth	6,838 / 7,289 (94%)	$792,004
