= Drake vs. Lil Wayne =

2014 concert tour by Drake and Lil Wayne

- American tour by Drake and Lil Wayne
- Associated albums: Nothing Was the Same; Tha Carter IV
- Start date: August 8, 2014
- End date: September 27, 2014
- No. of shows: 31
Drake tour chronology
Would You Like a Tour? (2013–2014)	Drake vs. Lil Wayne (2014)	Jungle Tour (2015)
Lil Wayne tour chronology
I Am Music II Tour (2011)	Drake vs. Lil Wayne (2014)	Sorry For The Wait 2 Tour (2015)

Drake vs. Lil Wayne was a co-headlining concert tour by Canadian recording artist and rapper Drake and American rapper Lil Wayne. The tour is based on the fighting game Street Fighter, and supported by Capcom, the game's creator. Each concert would pit both rappers in a battle against each other in a Street Fighter-style battle to determine who is "the best rapper in the world".

== Opening acts ==
- YG
- Yo Gotti
- PartyNextDoor
- G-Eazy
- iLoveMakonnen

== Set list ==
The app allows fans to choose which artist performs first. The winner is chosen after the battle. This setlist is representative of the first show in Darien Lake, New York. It does not represent all concerts for the duration of the entire tour.

Opening:

1. "Blunt Blowin"
2. "We Be Steady Mobbin'"
3. "Draft Day"
4. "We Made It"
5. "The Language"

Lil Wayne:

1. "Mr. Carter"
2. "Money on My Mind"
3. "D'usse"
4. "Da Sky Is Da Limit"

Drake:

1. "Headlines"
2. "Up All Night"
3. "Over"
4. "Crew Love"

Lil Wayne:

1. "Go DJ"
2. "Pop Bottles"
3. "Hustler Musik"
4. "Leather So Soft"
5. "Drop the World"

Drake:

1. "Pop That"
2. "All Me"
3. "Versace (remix)"
4. "Own It"
5. "Find Your Love"
6. "Marvin's Room"
7. "Hold On, We're Going Home"

Lil Wayne:

1. "How to Love"
2. "I'm Single"
3. "Mrs. Officer"
4. "Every Girl"
5. "Lollipop"
6. "Make It Rain"

Drake:

1. "I'm on One" (Both)
2. "No New Friends"
3. "Love Me" (Both)

Rap battle:

1. "Bandz a Make Her Dance" – Lil Wayne
2. "No Lie" – Drake
3. "Duffle Bag Boy" – Lil Wayne
4. "Loyal" – Lil Wayne
5. "Who Do You Love" – Drake
6. "6 Foot 7 Foot" – Lil Wayne
7. "Rich As Fuck" – Lil Wayne
8. "Trophies" – Drake
9. "Started from the Bottom" – Drake
10. "No Worries" – Lil Wayne
11. "A Milli" – Lil Wayne
12. "0 to 100" – Drake
13. "Worst Behavior" – Drake

Drake and Lil Wayne:

1. "The Motto" (Both)
2. "Grindin'" (Both)
3. "Believe Me" (Both)
4. "HYFR" (Both)

== Shows ==
Lil Wayne was the opener for every concert.

Date	City	Venue	Winner
August 8, 2014	Darien	Darien Lake Performing Arts Center	Lil Wayne
August 9, 2014	Noblesville	Klipsch Music Center	Lil Wayne
August 10, 2014	Tinley Park	First Midwest Bank Amphitheatre	Drake
August 12, 2014	Saratoga Springs	Saratoga Performing Arts Center	Lil Wayne
August 13, 2014	Hartford	Xfinity Theatre	Drake
August 15, 2014	Cincinnati	Riverbend Music Center	Drake
August 16, 2014	Clarkston	DTE Energy Music Theatre	Draw
August 17, 2014	Burgettstown	First Niagara Pavilion	Lil Wayne
August 19, 2014	Forest Hills	Forest Hills Tennis Stadium	Drake
August 21, 2014	Camden	Susquehanna Bank Center	Drake
August 25, 2014	Mansfield	XFINITY Center	Draw
August 26, 2014	Holmdel Township	PNC Bank Arts Center	Drake
August 27, 2014	Virginia Beach	Farm Bureau Live	Drake
August 29, 2014	Bristow	Jiffy Lube Live	Draw
August 30, 2014	Charlotte	PNC Music Pavilion	Lil Wayne
August 31, 2014	Atlanta	Aaron's Amphitheatre at Lakewood	Draw
September 3, 2014	West Palm Beach	Cruzan Amphitheatre	Lil Wayne
September 4, 2014	Tampa	MidFlorida Credit Union Amphitheatre	Drake
September 6, 2014	Austin	Austin360 Amphitheater	Drake
September 7, 2014	Dallas	Gexa Energy Pavilion	Drake
September 10, 2014	Morrison	Red Rocks Amphitheatre	Lil Wayne
September 11, 2014	West Valley City	USANA Amphitheatre	Lil Wayne
September 13, 2014	Ridgefield	Sleep Country Amphitheater	Drake
September 14, 2014	Auburn	White River Amphitheatre	Drake
September 16, 2014	Mountain View	Shoreline Amphitheatre	Drake
September 17, 2014	Wheatland^{[A]}	Sleep Train Amphitheatre (Wheatland, California)	Cancelled
September 19, 2014	Irvine	Verizon Wireless Amphitheatre	Drake
September 20, 2014	Chula Vista	Sleep Train Amphitheatre (Chula Vista, California)	Lil Wayne
September 22, 2014	Los Angeles	Hollywood Bowl	Drake
September 25, 2014	Phoenix	Ak-Chin Pavilion	Draw
September 27, 2014	The Woodlands	Cynthia Woods Mitchell Pavilion	Lil Wayne

== Notes ==
- A The concert on September 17 in Wheatland, California was canceled due to scheduling conflicts.
