= On My Way =

On My Way may refer to:

== Film and television ==
- On My Way (film), a 2013 French film
- "On My Way" (Glee), a television episode

== Music ==
=== Albums ===
- On My Way (B.J. Thomas album), 1968
- On My Way (Ben Kweller album) or the title song, 2004
- On My Way (deSoL album) or the title song, 2007
- On My Way (Phil Ochs album) or the title song, 2010
- On My Way, by Split Lip Rayfield, 2017

=== Songs ===
- "On My Way" (Alan Walker song), 2019
- "On My Way" (Axwell and Ingrosso song), 2015
- "On My Way" (Charlie Brown song), 2013
- "On My Way" (Jennifer Lopez song), 2021
- "On My Way" (Lea Michele song), 2014
- "On My Way" (Louis Armstrong song), 1959
- "On My Way" (Omar Naber song), 2017
- "On My Way" (Panetoz song), 2023
- "On My Way" (Sheppard song), 2019
- "On My Way" (Tiësto song), 2017
- "On My Way", by Al King, 1964
- "On My Way", by American Analog Set from The Fun of Watching Fireworks, 1996
- "On My Way", by Billy Boy on Poison, 2009
- "On My Way", by Black Party from Hummingbird, 2022
- "On My Way", by Boyce Avenue from All We Have Left, 2010
- "On My Way", by Buffalo from Mother's Choice, 1976
- "On My Way", by Buzz Clifford (as The Full Treatment), 1967
- "On My Way", by the Cat Empire from Cinema
- "On My Way", by Coleman Hawkins from The Hawk Returns, 1954
- "On My Way", by DJ Khaled from Victory, 2010
- "On My Way", by Drake, a non-album track released to promote Nothing Was the Same, 2013
- "On My Way", by Fitz and the Tantrums from the deluxe edition of Let Yourself Free, 2023
- "On My Way", by Foxes from All I Need, 2016
- "On My Way", by Grace Jones from Bulletproof Heart, 1989
- "On My Way", by Luna Halo from their 2007 self-titled album
- "On My Way", by Jain from Souldier, 2018
- "On My Way", by Park Bo-gum, 2025
- "On My Way", by Phil Collins on the soundtrack album Brother Bear, 2003
- "On My Way", by PrettyMuch, 2018
- "On My Way", by Spiderbait from Greatest Hits, 2005
- "On My Way", by the Vamps from Night & Day, 2017
- "On My Way", by Why Don't We, 2016

== See also ==
- I'm on My Way (disambiguation)
