= Summer Sixteen Tour =

2016 concert tour by Drake and Future

- National tour by Drake and Future
- Location: North America
- Associated album: Views; Evol; What a Time to Be Alive
- Start date: July 20, 2016
- End date: October 8, 2016
- Legs: 1
- No. of shows: 54
- Supporting acts: Roy Woods, Dvsn
- Box office: $80.9 million ($108.53 million in 2025 dollars)
Drake tour chronology
Would You Like a Tour? (2013–15)	Summer Sixteen Tour (2016)	Boy Meets World Tour (2017)
Future tour chronology
Summer Sixteen Tour (2016)	Nobody Safe Tour (2017)

The Summer Sixteen Tour was a co-headlining concert tour by Canadian rapper Drake and American rapper Future. It began on July 20, 2016 in Austin, Texas, and concluded with its final show in Toronto, Ontario, on October 8, 2016. With 60 performances across North America, the tour was produced by Apple Music to promote Drake's fourth studio album, Views (2016), Future's fourth studio album Evol (2016), as well as their collaborative mixtape, What a Time to Be Alive (2015). Guest appearances and support acts on the tour's various stops included 2 Chainz, ASAP Ferg, Bun B, Cam'Ron, DJ Khaled, Fat Joe, French Montana, Gucci Mane, Ice Cube, Kanye West, Kash Doll, Rihanna, T.I., Too Short, Ty Dolla $ign, Usher, and Young Thug, among others. The tour earned a gross total of $84.3 million off of 54 shows, making it the highest-grossing hip-hop tour of all time, until Drake broke this record with his own co-headlining Aubrey & the Three Migos Tour in 2018.

== Background ==
Drake and Future first collaborated in 2012 on the song "Tony Montana". In 2015, the two released a single called "Where Ya At", which later was included as part of Future's third studio album, DS2. Since then, other notable collaborations with the two include Drake's song "Grammys" (feat. Future) and "Jumpman" (2015). The duo also worked on a collaborative mixtape entitled What a Time to Be Alive, which was released on September 20, 2015. Throughout 2013 and 2014, during Drake's Would You Like a Tour?, Future made multiple guest appearances, often appearing to perform alongside him and/or serve as the opening act of the show. Rumours of a co-headlining tour from Drake and Future first circulated following the release of What a Time to Be Alive, leading Drake to post on Twitter that he was planning to embark on a tour with Future in the summer.

On April 25, 2016, the Summer Sixteen tour was announced by Drake, with Future as co-headliner. Later, on that same day, several dates were announced via Drake's website, with dvsn and Roy Woods all set to perform as opening artists.

== Set list ==
This set list is representative of the show on July 20, 2016 in Austin. It is not representative of all concerts for the duration of the tour.

1. "Summer Sixteen"
2. "Still Here"
3. "Started from the Bottom"
4. "9"
5. ""U With Me?"
6. "Feel No Ways"
7. "Headlines"
8. "Trophies"
9. "HYFR (Hell Ya Fucking Right)"
10. "0 to 100 / The Catch Up" / "6 God" / "Worst Behavior" / "We Made It" / "Blessings" / "All Me" / "No Lie" / "Versace"/ "Pop That" / "Over" / "I'm on One" / "Up All Night" / "Miss Me" / "Crew Love"
11. "With You"
12. "Child's Play"
13. "Fire and Desire"
14. "Come and See Me"
15. "Faithful" (with dvsn)
16. "Hotline Bling"
17. "Hold On, We're Going Home"
18. "The Motto"
19. "Right Hand"
20. "For Free"
21. "My Way" (Fetty Wap cover)
22. "Grammys"
23. "Scholarships"
24. "Love Me"
25. "I'm the Plug"
26. "Big Rings"
27. "Jumpman"
28. "Diamonds Dancing"
29. "Work"
30. "Take Care" / "Too Good" (verses)
31. "Controlla"
32. "One Dance"
33. "Back to Back"
34. "Pop Style"
35. "Hype"
36. "Know Yourself"
37. "Energy"
38. "Legend"
Notes
- Drake performed "Pop Style" and "Father Stretch My Hands" with Kanye West at the 2nd show in Chicago, Illinois.
- Drake performed "All the Way Up" and "No Shopping" with French Montana, "Pop Style", "Father Stretch My Hands", "Famous", and "Runaway" with Kanye West, and "Needed Me", "Work", and "Too Good" with Rihanna at the 2nd show in Toronto, Ontario.
- Future performed "Best Friend" with Young Thug and "New Level" with ASAP Ferg at the 1st show in New York City.
- Drake brought out Derrick Rose at the 2nd show in New York City.
- Drake performed "Oh Boy" and "Hey Ma" with Cam'Ron and Juelz Santana, "No Role Modelz", "A Tale Of 2 Cities", and "Planez" with J. Cole, and "All the Way Up" with Fat Joe at the 4th show in New York City.
- Future performed "Whatever You Like" and "What You Know" with T.I. at the 4th show in New York City.
- Drake brought out LeBron James at the show in Columbus, Ohio.
- Drake performed "Forever" with Eminem at the show in Detroit, Michigan.
- Drake performed "HYFR (Hell Ya Fucking Right)", "A Milli", and "We Be Steady Mobbin" with Lil Wayne at the show in Philadelphia, Pennsylvania.
- Drake performed "Back on Road" and "1st Day out the Feds" with Gucci Mane and "Big Amount" and "Watch Out" with 2 Chainz at the 1st show in Atlanta, Georgia.
- Drake brought out Gucci Mane for the 2nd time and also brought out Usher, who performed "Confessions Part II" and "No Limit with Young Thug at the 2nd show in Atlanta, Georgia.
- Drake performed "Work" with Rihanna, who later performed "Bitch Better Have My Money" at the 2nd show in Miami, Florida. He also brought out Lil Wayne, who performed "A Milli" and "We Be Steady Mobbin".
- Drake performed "Draped Up" and "Get Throwed" with Bun B and "A Milli" and "We Be Steady Mobbin" with Lil Wayne at the 2nd show in Houston, Texas.
- Drake performed "Why You Always Hatin? and "Twist My Fingaz" with YG, "The Next Episode" and "Drop It Like It's Hot" with Snoop Dogg, and "Blase (song)" with Ty Dolla $ign at the 1st show in Los Angeles, California.
- Drake performed "All I Do is Win" and "I Got the Keys" with DJ Khaled, "Wasted" with Lil Wayne, and "Work" and "Bitch Better Have My Money" with Rihanna at the 3rd show in Los Angeles, California.
- Drake brought out Kevin Durant and Kamaiyah at the 1st show in Oakland, California.
- Drake performed "Blow The Whistle" and "Shake That Monkey" with Too $hort and brought out Stephen Curry & Draymond Green at the 2nd show in Oakland, California.
- Drake performed "The Next Episode" with Dr. Dre, "Straight Outta Compton" with Ice Cube, "All Me" with Big Sean, and "No Shopping" with French Montana at the 3rd show in Inglewood, California.

== Tour dates ==
List of concerts, showing date, city, country, venue, opening acts, tickets sold, number of available tickets and amount of gross revenue
Date	City	Country	Venue	Opening acts	Attendance	Revenue
North America
July 20, 2016	Austin	United States	Frank Erwin Center	Roy Wood$ dvsn	11,318 / 11,318	$1,470,583
July 21, 2016	Dallas	United States	American Airlines Center	Roy Wood$ dvsn	12,605 / 13,493	$1,563,490
July 23, 2016	Kansas City	United States	Sprint Center	Roy Wood$ dvsn	12,983 / 13,364	$1,180,862
July 24, 2016	Saint Paul	United States	Xcel Energy Center	Roy Wood$ dvsn	13,624 / 14,014	$1,346,114
July 26, 2016	Chicago	United States	United Center	Roy Wood$ dvsn	27,037 / 30,294	$3,214,405
July 27, 2016	Chicago	United States	United Center	Roy Wood$ dvsn	27,037 / 30,294	$3,214,405
July 31, 2016	Toronto	Canada	Air Canada Centre	Roy Wood$ dvsn	30,070 / 30,070	$2,686,110
August 1, 2016	Toronto	Canada	Air Canada Centre	Roy Wood$ dvsn	30,070 / 30,070	$2,686,110
August 4, 2016	New York City	United States	Madison Square Garden	Roy Wood$ dvsn	58,085 / 58,085	$6,804,352
August 5, 2016	New York City	United States	Madison Square Garden	Roy Wood$ dvsn	58,085 / 58,085	$6,804,352
August 6, 2016	New York City	United States	Madison Square Garden	Roy Wood$ dvsn	58,085 / 58,085	$6,804,352
August 8, 2016	New York City	United States	Madison Square Garden	Roy Wood$ dvsn	58,085 / 58,085	$6,804,352
August 10, 2016	Boston	United States	TD Garden	Roy Wood$ dvsn	13,490 / 13,951	$1,463,377
August 12, 2016	Buffalo	United States	First Niagara Center	Roy Wood$ dvsn	13,547 / 13,965	$1,540,131
August 13, 2016	Columbus	United States	Nationwide Arena	Roy Wood$ dvsn	13,986 / 14,417	$1,510,033
August 14, 2016	Nashville	United States	Bridgestone Arena	Roy Wood$ dvsn	15,931 / 15,931	$1,410,223
August 16, 2016	Detroit	United States	Joe Louis Arena	Roy Wood$ dvsn	14,891 / 15,674	$1,504,752
August 17, 2016	Pittsburgh	United States	Consol Energy Center	Roy Wood$ dvsn	13,622 / 13,622	$1,351,855
August 19, 2016	Washington, D.C.	United States	Verizon Center	Roy Wood$ dvsn	27,663 / 28,584	$3,259,446
August 20, 2016	Washington, D.C.	United States	Verizon Center	Roy Wood$ dvsn	27,663 / 28,584	$3,259,446
August 21, 2016	Philadelphia	United States	Wells Fargo Center	Roy Wood$ dvsn	13,402 / 13,402	$1,752,511
August 23, 2016	Greensboro	United States	Greensboro Coliseum	Roy Wood$ dvsn	13,720 / 14,184	$1,304,350
August 25, 2016	Atlanta	United States	Philips Arena	Roy Wood$ dvsn	28,864 / 28,864	$3,106,599
August 26, 2016	Atlanta	United States	Philips Arena	Roy Wood$ dvsn	28,864 / 28,864	$3,106,599
August 27, 2016	Tampa	United States	Amalie Arena	Roy Wood$ dvsn	13,337 / 13,337	$1,401,166
August 30, 2016	Miami	United States	American Airlines Arena	Roy Wood$ dvsn	26,608 / 27,806	$3,282,545
August 31, 2016	Miami	United States	American Airlines Arena	Roy Wood$ dvsn	26,608 / 27,806	$3,282,545
September 2, 2016	New Orleans	United States	Smoothie King Center	Roy Wood$ dvsn	13,241 / 14,073	$1,243,871
September 3, 2016	Houston	United States	Toyota Center	Roy Wood$ dvsn	24,507 / 24,507	$3,352,284
September 4, 2016	Houston	United States	Toyota Center	Roy Wood$ dvsn	24,507 / 24,507	$3,352,284
September 6, 2016	Phoenix	United States	Talking Stick Resort Arena	Roy Wood$ dvsn	12,084 / 12,542	$1,310,117
September 7, 2016	Los Angeles	United States	Staples Center	Roy Wood$ dvsn	40,155 / 40,227	$4,809,979
September 9, 2016	Los Angeles	United States	Staples Center	Roy Wood$ dvsn	40,155 / 40,227	$4,809,979
September 10, 2016	Los Angeles	United States	Staples Center	Roy Wood$ dvsn	40,155 / 40,227	$4,809,979
September 11, 2016	Las Vegas	United States	T-Mobile Arena	Roy Wood$ dvsn	15,142 / 15,142	$2,089,942
September 13, 2016	Oakland	United States	Oracle Arena	Roy Wood$ dvsn	24,956 / 25,831	$3,294,596
September 14, 2016	Oakland	United States	Oracle Arena	Roy Wood$ dvsn	24,956 / 25,831	$3,294,596
September 16, 2016	Tacoma	United States	Tacoma Dome	Roy Wood$ dvsn	18,120 / 18,120	$1,748,350
September 17, 2016	Vancouver	Canada	Rogers Arena	Roy Wood$ dvsn	—N/a	—N/a
September 18, 2016	Vancouver	Canada	Rogers Arena	Roy Wood$ dvsn	—N/a	—N/a
September 20, 2016	Edmonton	Canada	Rogers Place	Roy Wood$ dvsn	—N/a	—N/a
September 21, 2016	Edmonton	Canada	Rogers Place	Roy Wood$ dvsn	—N/a	—N/a
September 24, 2016	San Jose	United States	SAP Center	Roy Wood$ dvsn	25,817 / 26,591	$3,099,176
September 25, 2016	San Jose	United States	SAP Center	Roy Wood$ dvsn	25,817 / 26,591	$3,099,176
September 27, 2016	Inglewood	United States	The Forum	Roy Wood$ dvsn	42,316 / 42,316	$4,545,367
September 28, 2016	Inglewood	United States	The Forum	Roy Wood$ dvsn	42,316 / 42,316	$4,545,367
September 29, 2016	Inglewood	United States	The Forum	Roy Wood$ dvsn	42,316 / 42,316	$4,545,367
October 1, 2016	Denver	United States	Pepsi Center	Roy Wood$ dvsn	—N/a	—N/a
October 2, 2016	Denver	United States	Pepsi Center	Roy Wood$ dvsn	—N/a	—N/a
October 4, 2016	Des Moines	United States	Wells Fargo Arena	Roy Wood$ dvsn	—N/a	—N/a
October 5, 2016	Chicago	United States	United Center	Roy Wood$ dvsn	—N/a	—N/a
October 7, 2016	Montreal	Canada	Bell Centre	Roy Wood$ dvsn	15,731 / 15,731	$1,722,100
October 8, 2016	Toronto	Canada	Air Canada Centre	Roy Wood$ dvsn	15,485 / 15,485	$1,561,900
TOTAL					634,662 / 647,265 (98%)	$71,238,937

== Cancelled shows ==
List of cancelled concerts, showing date, city, country, venue and reason for cancellation
Date	City	Country	Venue	Reason/Additional Info
October 9, 2016	Toronto	Canada	Air Canada Centre	Drake's ankle injury
October 11, 2016	Brooklyn	United States	Barclays Center	Drake's ankle injury
October 12, 2016	Brooklyn	United States	Barclays Center	Drake's ankle injury
October 13, 2016	Philadelphia	United States	Wells Fargo Center	Drake's ankle injury
October 15, 2016	Newark	United States	Prudential Center	Drake's ankle injury
October 16, 2016	Newark	United States	Prudential Center	Drake's ankle injury
