= I'm on My Way =

I'm on My Way may refer to:

== Film ==
- I'm on My Way (film), a 1919 short comedy film

== Music ==
- I'm on My Way, an album by Jackie Moore, 1979
- "I'm on My Way" (traditional song), a gospel song
- "I'm on My Way" (Captain & Tennille song), 1978
- "I'm on My Way" (Dean Parrish song), 1967
- "I'm on My Way" (The Proclaimers song), 1989
- "I'm on My Way", a song by Betty Boo from GRRR! It's Betty Boo, 1992
- "I'm on My Way", a song by Gotthard from Dial Hard, 1994

== See also ==
- On My Way (disambiguation)
