= Furthest Thing (disambiguation) =

"Furthest Thing" is a 2013 song by Canadian rapper Drake. The Furthest Thing may refer to:

- The Furthest Thing, 2018 EP by Failure
- "The Furthest Thing", 2022 song by Maren Morris from the album Humble Quest
