= Louis and the Angels =

Studio album by Louis Armstrong
- Released: 1957
- Recorded: January 29–30, 1957
- Studio: NYC
- Genre: Jazz
- Length: 39:20
- Label: Decca; DL 8488

Louis Armstrong chronology
Louis Armstrong Meets Oscar Peterson (1957)	Louis and the Angels (1957)	Louis and the Good Book (1957)

Louis and the Angels is a studio album by American jazz trumpeter and singer Louis Armstrong, recorded on January 29–30, 1957, and released on Decca later that year. Loosely a concept album, the setlist comprises songs referring to angels.

== Reception ==
Professional ratings
Review scores
Source	Rating
AllMusic	3/5 stars

The AllMusic review by Scott Yanow says, "This obscure set by Louis Armstrong has its strange appeal. Satch gets off a few good trumpet solos and is quite cheerful throughout, even joking during 'The Prisoner's Song' when the word 'angel' finally shows up.... Although more commercial than Armstrong's usual recordings of the era, this set is more memorable than one would expect and is worth searching for."

== Track listing ==
All arrangements by Sy Oliver.

=== Side 1 ===
1. "When Did You Leave Heaven?" (Richard A. Whiting, Walter Bullock) – 3:42
2. "You're a Heavenly Thing" (Jack Little, Joe Young) – 3:17
3. "I Married an Angel" (Richard Rodgers, Lorenz Hart) – 3:40
4. "A Sinner Kissed an Angel" (Mack David, Richard M. Jones, Ray Joseph) – 2:42
5. "Angela Mia" (Lew Pollack, Ernö Rapée) – 3:22
6. "Angel Child" (Benny Davis, George Price, Abner Silver) – 2:54

=== Side 2 ===
1. "And the Angels Sing" (Ziggy Elman, Johnny Mercer) – 3:23
2. "Fools Rush In (Where Angels Fear to Tread)" (Rube Bloom, Mercer) – 3:32
3. "I'll String Along with You" (Al Dubin, Harry Warren) – 3:05
4. "Angel" (Peter DeRose, Mitchell Parish) – 3:40
5. "The Prisoner's Song" (Guy Massey) – 3:12
6. "Goodnight, Angel" (Allie Wrubel, Herb Magidson) – 2:51

== Personnel ==
- Louis Armstrong – trumpet, vocals
- George Dorsey – alto saxophone, flute
- Phil Urso, Lucky Thompson – tenor saxophone
- Dave McRae – baritone saxophone
- Everett Barksdale, George Barnes – guitar
- Billy Kyle – piano
- Joe Benjamin, Sid Block – bass
- Rudy Taylor – drums
- Sy Oliver – conductor
  - chorus and orchestra
