= Louis Armstrong Meets Oscar Peterson =

Studio album by Louis Armstrong and Oscar Peterson
- Released: Late 1959
- Recorded: July 31 and October 14, 1957
- Studio: Capitol (Hollywood)
- Genre: Jazz
- Length: 70:02
- Label: Verve
- Producer: Norman Granz

Louis Armstrong chronology
Porgy and Bess (1957)	Louis Armstrong Meets Oscar Peterson (1959)	Louis and the Angels (1957)

Oscar Peterson chronology
Oscar Peterson Plays Porgy & Bess (1959)	Louis Armstrong Meets Oscar Peterson (1959)	Sonny Stitt Sits in with the Oscar Peterson Trio (1959)

Professional ratings
Review scores
Source	Rating
Allmusic	3/5 stars
DownBeat	2/5 stars
The Rolling Stone Jazz Record Guide	2/5 stars
The Penguin Guide to Jazz Recordings	3/4 stars

Louis Armstrong Meets Oscar Peterson is a 1959 studio album (recorded in 1957) by Louis Armstrong, accompanied by Oscar Peterson.

The album was reissued in 1997 on CD with four bonus tracks, recorded at the sessions that produced Ella and Louis Again.

== Track listing ==
1. "That Old Feeling" (Lew Brown, Sammy Fain) – 2:42
2. "Let's Fall in Love" (Harold Arlen, Ted Koehler) – 3:14
3. "I'll Never Be the Same" (Matty Malneck, Frank Signorelli, Gus Kahn) – 3:29
4. "Blues in the Night" (Arlen, Johnny Mercer) – 5:10
5. "How Long Has This Been Going On?" (George Gershwin, Ira Gershwin) – 5:56
6. "I Was Doing All Right" (G. Gershwin, I. Gershwin) – 3:20
7. "What's New?" (Sonny Burke, Bob Haggart) – 2:40
8. "Moon Song" (Sam Coslow, Arthur Johnston) – 4:31
9. "Just One of Those Things" (Cole Porter) – 4:02
10. "There's No You" (Tom Adair, Hal Hopper) – 2:14
11. "You Go to My Head" (J. Fred Coots, Haven Gillespie) – 6:24
12. "Sweet Lorraine" (Cliff Burwell, Mitchell Parish) – 5:11

=== Bonus tracks ===
13. "I Get a Kick out of You" (Porter) – 4:16
14. "Makin' Whoopee" (Walter Donaldson, Kahn) – 3:55
15. "Willow Weep for Me" (Ann Ronell) – 4:16
16. "Let's Do It (Let's Fall in Love)" (Porter) – 8:42

== Personnel ==
=== Performance ===
- Louis Armstrong – trumpet, vocals
- Oscar Peterson – piano
- Herb Ellis – guitar
- Ray Brown – double bass
- Louie Bellson – drums

=== Production ===
- Leonard Feather – liner notes
- Val Valentin – engineer
- Norman Granz – producer
