= On My Way (Louis Armstrong song) =

Single by Louis Armstrong

from the album Louis and the Good Book
- Released: 1959
- Recorded: 1958
- Genre: Jazz

"On My Way" is a Louis Armstrong song that appeared on the album Louis and the Good Book in 1958 and was issued with "I'll String Along with You" as a single in 1959. It features a solo section with Louis and Trummy Young.

A variant of "I'm on My Way", Armstrong's version starts with "On My Way" or "I'm on My Way" (or similar phrases in various versions) and then goes into a chorus "On my way now, got on my traveling shoes...".

The song is no relation to "Oh, Lawd, I'm on My Way!", a song sung by Ella Fitzgerald the previous year (1957) on the Porgy and Bess album by Fitzgerald and Armstrong. That song begins: "Porgy and all, I'm on my way to a heav'nly lan'".
