= Louis and the Good Book =

Studio album by Louis Armstrong
- Released: 1958
- Genre: Jazz, gospel, spirituals
- Label: Decca

Louis Armstrong chronology
Louis and the Angels (1957)	Louis and the Good Book (1958)	Louis... (1959)

Louis and the Good Book is a 1958 jazz and spirituals album by Louis Armstrong.

Singles included "I'll String Along with You" / "On My Way (Out on My Traveling Shoes)" 1959, also known as I'm On My Way.

== Track listing ==
1. "Nobody Knows the Trouble I've Seen" - 3:03
2. "Shadrack" - 3:00
3. "Go Down Moses" - 3:37
4. "Rock My Soul" - 3:12
5. "Ezekiel Saw the Wheel" - 2:43
6. "On My Way (Got On My Travelin' Shoes)" - 3:05
7. "Down by the Riverside" - 3:13
8. "Swing Low, Sweet Chariot" - 3:10
9. "Sometimes I Feel Like a Motherless Child" - 3:31
10. "Jonah and the Whale" - 2:50
11. "Didn't It Rain" - 2:52
12. "This Train" - 2:31

Extra tracks on CD reissue

1. "Sit Down, You're Rockin' the Boat (With Sy Oliver Chorus)" - 3:18
2. "That's What the Man Said (With Sy Oliver Chorus)" - 2:58
3. "Going to Shout All Over God's Heaven (With The Decca Chorus Dir. By Lyn Murray)" - 2:49
4. "Nobody Knows De Trouble I've Seen (With The Decca Chorus Dir. By Lyn Murray)" - 3:12
5. "Jonah and the Whale (With The Decca Chorus Dir. By Lyn Murray)" - 2:49
6. "Elder Eatmore's Sermon on Throwing Stones" - 4:22
7. "Elder Eatmore's Sermon on Generosity" - 4:22
