= Aston Martin Music =

2010 single by Rick Ross featuring Drake and Chrisette Michele

Single by Rick Ross featuring Drake and Chrisette Michele

from the album Teflon Don
- Released: October 5, 2010
- Recorded: 2009
- Genre: Hip hop; mafioso rap; R&B
- Length: 4:31
- Label: Maybach; Def Jam
- Songwriters: William Roberts; Aubrey Graham; Chrisette Payne; Kevin Crowe; Erik Ortiz
- Producer: J.U.S.T.I.C.E. League

Rick Ross singles chronology
"Swagger Right" (2010)	"Aston Martin Music" (2010)	"Living Better Now" (2010)

Chrisette Michele singles chronology
"All I Ever Think About" (2010)	"Aston Martin Music" (2010)	"I'm a Star" (2010)

Drake singles chronology
"Right Above It" (2010)	"Aston Martin Music" (2010)	"Loving You No More" (2010)

"Aston Martin Music" is the fourth single from rapper Rick Ross's fourth studio album Teflon Don. The song was released as a single on October 5, 2010. The song, which was produced by J.U.S.T.I.C.E. League, it features vocals from Canadian rapper Drake and R&B singer Chrisette Michele.

== Music video ==
Directed by Gil Green, the music video was premiered on BET's 106 & Park on October 13, 2010. The video, filmed in Miami, Florida, contains Aston Martin models, including the V8 Vantage Volante, DBS V12 Volante, DB9 Volante and Rapide. Drake and Chrisette Michele are featured in the video as well as a cameo from rapper Birdman. It begins with a young Rick Ross determined to own an Aston Martin and live a luxurious life. Throughout the video, scenes of Ross' lover and her dilemma are played. The plot of the video demonstrates Rick Ross' lover taking the fall for a D.E.A. bust, and finding Rick Ross waiting with an Aston Martin for her to drive when she is released. The lead model who plays the role of Ross' woman is Tracey Thomas.

== Interpolation ==
The song interpolates lyrics from LL Cool J's 1987 single "I Need Love".

== Paris Morton Music ==
"Paris Morton Music"

Song by Drake

from the album Care Package
- Released: August 2, 2019
- Genre: Hip hop
- Length: 4:11
- Songwriter: Aubrey Graham
- Producer: J.U.S.T.I.C.E. League

A song only by Drake called "Paris Morton Music" features similar music which was also credited to J.U.S.T.I.C.E. League. It differs from "Aston Martin Music" as it does not feature Rick Ross nor Chrisette Michele. However, Drake's rather short verse from the original has been extended to a hook (sung by Drake himself), which is played once at the start and once at the end of the song, with Drake's rapping in the middle. Drake's rap verse from Paris Morton Music is featured on Aston Martin Music's single and the music video.

A sequel was featured on Drake's third studio album, Nothing Was the Same as the outro "Pound Cake / Paris Morton Music 2" featuring Jay-Z.

Nine years later, "Paris Morton Music" was included as a track on Drake's 2019 compilation album, Care Package.

=== Charts ===
Chart (2019)	Peak position
US Rolling Stone Top 100	66

== Charts ==
=== Weekly charts ===
Chart (2010–2011)	Peak position
US Billboard Hot 100	30
US Hot R&B/Hip-Hop Songs (Billboard)	2
US Rhythmic Airplay (Billboard)	11

=== Year-end charts ===
Chart (2010)	Position
US Hot R&B/Hip-Hop Songs (Billboard)	72
Chart (2011)	Position
US Hot R&B/Hip-Hop Songs (Billboard)	11

== Certifications ==
Region	Certification	Certified units/sales
New Zealand (RMNZ)	Gold	15,000^{‡}
United Kingdom (BPI)	Silver	200,000^{‡}
United States (RIAA)	3× Platinum	3,000,000^{‡}
^{‡} Sales+streaming figures based on certification alone.
