= Furthest Thing =

2013 song by Drake

Song by Drake

from the album Nothing Was the Same
- Genre: Hip hop; soul
- Length: 4:27
- Label: OVO; Young Money; Cash Money; Republic
- Songwriter(s): Aubrey Graham; Anthony Palman; Noah Shebib; Marvin "Hagler" Thomas; Adrian Eccleston
- Producer(s): Noah "40" Shebib; Thomas; Jake One (co-prod.)

"Furthest Thing" is a song by Canadian rapper Drake, recorded for his studio album Nothing Was the Same. The track was written by Drake, Anthony Palman, Noah "40" Shebib, Marvin "Hagler" Thomas and Adrian Eccleston, and produced by 40, Thomas and Jake One. It reached number 191 in France, number 95 in the UK, and number 56 on the US Billboard Hot 100.

== Production and composition ==
"Furthest Thing" was written by Drake, Anthony Palman, Noah "40" Shebib, Marvin "Hagler" Thomas and Adrian Eccleston, with 40, Thomas and Jake One producing it. In addition to Drake's lead vocals, the original track includes Brian Hamilton, Deborah Vernal, Jennifer Tulloch, Omar Richards, Owen Lee, Patricia Shirley and Rachel Craig as backing vocalists.

== Chart positions ==
Chart (2013)	Peak position
France (SNEP)	191
UK Hip Hop/R&B (OCC)	27
UK Singles (Official Charts Company)	95
US Billboard Hot 100	56
US Hot R&B/Hip-Hop Songs (Billboard)	16

== Certifications ==
Region	Certification	Certified units/sales
Australia (ARIA)	Gold	35,000^{‡}
United Kingdom (BPI)	Silver	200,000^{‡}
United States (RIAA)	Platinum	1,000,000^{‡}
^{‡} Sales+streaming figures based on certification alone.
