= Nothing Was the Same =

2013 studio album by Drake

Studio album by Drake
- Released: September 24, 2013
- Recorded: 2012–2013
- Studios: The G.O. Studio (Santa Clarita); Jungle City (New York City); Marvin's Room (Los Angeles); Metalworks (Mississauga); Noble Street (Toronto); Tree Sound (Atlanta); The Yolo Estate (Hidden Hills)
- Genre: Hip-hop
- Length: 59:22
- Labels: OVO; Young Money; Cash Money; Republic
- Producers: 40; Boi-1da; Detail; DJ Dahi; Hagler; Jordan Evans; Key Wane; Majid Jordan; Mike Zombie; Nineteen85; Sampha

Drake chronology
Take Care (2011)	Nothing Was the Same (2013)	If You're Reading This It's Too Late (2015)

Deluxe edition cover

Singles from Nothing Was the Same
- 1. "Started from the Bottom" Released: February 6, 2013; 2. "Hold On, We're Going Home" Released: August 7, 2013; 3. "All Me" Released: September 24, 2013; 4. "Pound Cake" Released: September 26, 2013; 5. "The Language" Released: October 29, 2013; 6. "Too Much" Released: October 31, 2013; 7. "Worst Behavior" Released: June 9, 2014

Nothing Was the Same is the third studio album by the Canadian rapper Drake. It was released on September 24, 2013, through OVO Sound, Young Money Entertainment, Cash Money Records, and Republic Records. Work on the record began in 2012 and continued through 2013. As an executive producer, Drake enlisted collaborators such as 2 Chainz, Big Sean, Majid Jordan, Jay-Z, Jhené Aiko and Sampha for guest appearances on the album. The album's production was primarily handled by 40 and other OVO Sound producers; including Boi-1da, Mike Zombie, Nineteen85 and Detail.

The album was supported by the seven successful singles; "Started from the Bottom", "Hold On, We're Going Home", "All Me", "Pound Cake", "The Language", "Too Much" and "Worst Behavior". "Wu-Tang Forever" was released prior to the album as a promotional single. "Started from the Bottom" and "Hold On, We're Going Home" were both top 10 hits on the US Billboard Hot 100. Drake also toured with Future, Miguel and PartyNextDoor from October through December 2013, on the Would You Like a Tour? concert tour.

Nothing Was the Same received generally positive reviews, and was named as one of the best albums of 2013 by multiple publications. The album was a commercial success, debuting at number one on the US Billboard 200 with 658,000 copies sold in its first week of release. Within three months of its release, the album became the seventh best-selling album of 2013 in the United States. It also debuted at number one in Canada and Denmark, and number two in Australia and the United Kingdom. The album was nominated for Best Rap Album at the 2014 Grammy Awards.

== Background ==
While touring the United Kingdom in support of Take Care during March 2012, Drake announced in an interview that he had begun work on his third studio album. In April 2012, Drake had stated that the album will have a different style and tempo than that of Take Care. This is due to his different mindset and his recent move to the Los Angeles area in Hidden Hills, where he is Kanye West's neighbor. He told GQ, "This is my fucking moment to say if I wanted to rap all the time, really rap, I would, but I also love to make music. I'll do this for you right now. But it's for me, too. It's my story…I'm trying to get back to that kid in the basement. To say what he has to say. And I'm trying to make it last."

On February 10, 2013, the same night Drake won a Grammy Award for Best Rap Album at the 55th Grammy Awards, he announced the title of his third album would be Nothing Was the Same. During an interview with Ryan Seacrest on the red carpet, Drake told E!, "I think music, it's a process we all go through," he said. "It's an evolution. You're constantly figuring out what works for you." He explained the difference between Nothing Was the Same and Take Care to XXL saying,

Take Care was about connecting with my city and connecting with my past and sort of still feeling guilty that I'm not in love with one of these girls that cared about me from back in the day. Now, I'm 26, I'm with my friends, I'm making jobs for people, I'm making memories for people that will last a lifetime. I don't need to be in love right now. I don't need these things that I maybe once thought that I needed to feel normal and feel righteous about myself. I think for the first time in an album I'm content—not satisfied—but proud of where I'm at as a person.

Drake also stated that Marvin Gaye's 1978 double album Here, My Dear had been a big influence on his current musical direction to ballads rather than "straight rap" and he had been doing recording in Gaye's old studio Marvin's Room. He later told MTV, "This album is not some straight rap album, I'll never do a straight rap album. That's not how I came into this and that's never what I'll do. I make songs for the people." He also spoke of Marvin Gaye again saying, "I have aspirations to be Marvin Gaye in the back of my head. So I just want to sing the world's triumphs and problems on one record." In the same interview he explained more about the differences between Nothing Was the Same and Take Care saying; "The music I'm making is more concise, more clear, I've been able to get my thoughts across a lot better on this album. Take Care is a great album but I listened to it and realized where I could do better and I think I've done better on this album." Drake stated in a Vibe magazine interview in 2014 that he had intended for the album's deluxe edition to be in reverse order, but didn't due to "some iTunes [issue] or something like that"

== Recording and production ==
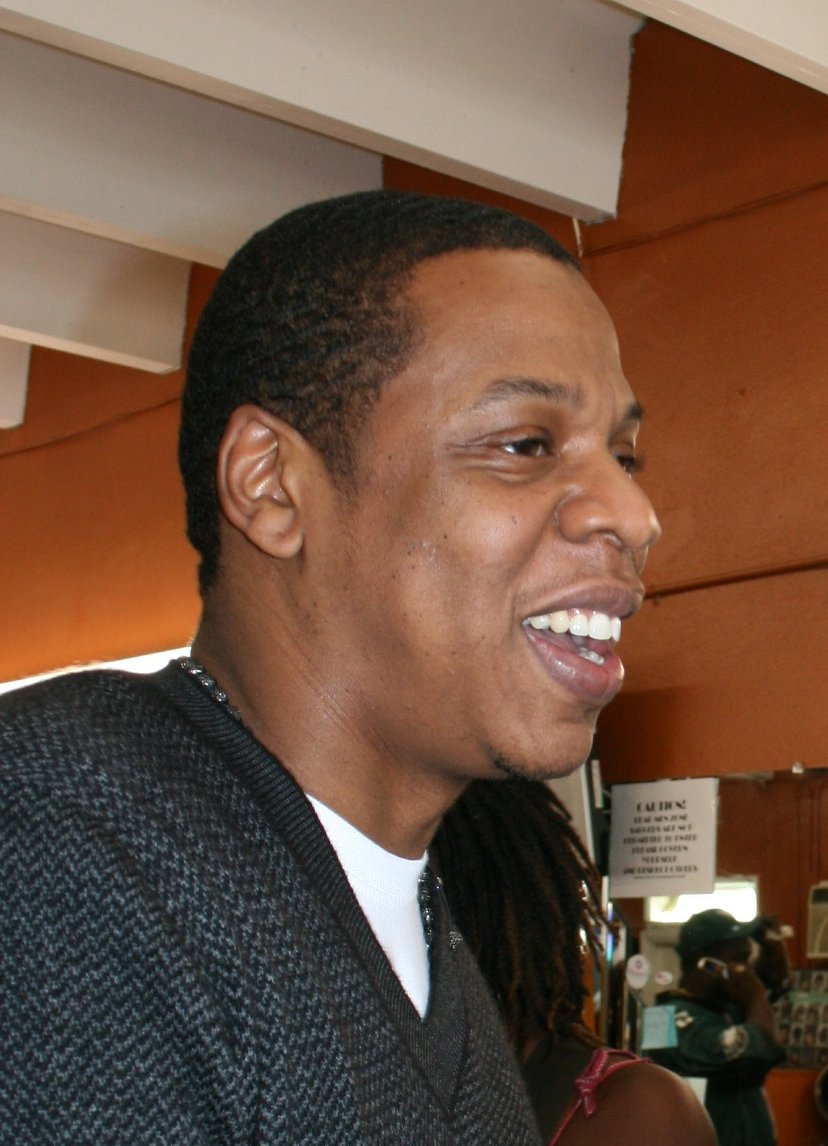
Jay-Z is the only other rapper to make an appearance on the standard edition of the album.

In March 2012, Drake was reportedly in the studio with rapper 2 Chainz and record producer 40. He has been stating that he was hoping that he could work with Jamie xx, while in the United Kingdom, saying that he wants him to "have a bigger presence on my third record". Jake One produced a song for Drake, originally expected to be released ahead of the third annual OVO Fest. The video, which features Drake previewing the untitled song, while smoking a hookah, was released on June 26, 2012, through Vimeo. In December 2012, Young Chop confirmed that he was working on a song with Drake. He also then released two free songs, which is a collaboration with singer-songwriter James Fauntleroy.

In 2013, Drake was also seen in the studio with rapper Jay-Z, working on what has yet to be a song, titled "Pound Cake". On June 3, 2013, Drake revealed the first guest appearance on the album, which is American singer Jhené Aiko and then he also said that he had recently been in the studio with singer Anthony Hamilton. On June 15, 2013, Drake confirmed with Hot 107.9, that he had made the final recording process for the album. On September 3, 2013, Drake confirmed on Twitter, that the album has been mixed and mastered.

In July 2013, Complex reported that he was in the studio with artists, such as Future, Rick Ross, Justin Timberlake, Sade, Migos, Saukrates, TLC and Miguel, while working on the album. Complex also reported that he had worked with producers, during the recording process, including Hit-Boy, Just Blaze, Chilly Gonzales, Mike Will Made It, Zaytoven, Bink, Detail, James Blake, Swizz Beatz and Timbaland. On July 27, 2013, Drake posted a picture of him and frequent collaborator The Weeknd in the studio.

In August 2013, Drake told Rolling Stone during an interview that the album would contain features by Jay-Z and Lil Wayne, with production from Hudson Mohawke. In a story in the September issue of Rolling Stone, he confirmed that the album was primarily produced by Noah "40" Shebib, with production also coming from Hit-Boy, Boi-1da, Detail and Hudson Mohawke. He also confirmed working with OVO Fest performer, singer and post-dubstep producer James Blake. The final track listing contained guest appearances by Jhené Aiko, Majid Jordan, Detail, Sampha, Jay-Z, Big Sean and 2 Chainz.

== Album artwork ==
On August 21, 2013, Drake revealed the album's cover artwork was an oil painting by Southern California's Kadir Nelson, the designer behind Michael Jackson's posthumous album, Michael. The two versions of the cover feature illustrations of profiles of Drake as a child, while the other shows the rapper as an adult. His younger self is adorned only with an afro comb in his hair, and his older self has a gold chain. Both covers are set against a blissful cloudy blue sky. The cover artwork was compared to iconic hip hop albums Nas' Illmatic, The Notorious B.I.G.'s Ready to Die and Lil Wayne's Tha Carter III. "What that album art is to me, is the fact that this is my most clear, concise thoughts from now, and my best recollection of then," Drake explained. Both covers will be available side by side in stores, so consumers may choose which one they want.

The artist, Kadir Nelson told MTV, "Drake wanted a signature painting, he didn't want something that looked like a hip-hop album cover. He wanted something that was a little bit more artsy and had more weight to it, so I did a number of sketches, and when we picked out what he liked, I sculpted it together." He said he listened to Drake's music in the studio to gain inspiration and he also gave Drake a full sized painting of the album cover. The album artwork would end up being named the fourth-best album cover of 2013 by Complex. XXL also listed it among the best album covers of 2013.

== Release ==
On June 22, 2013, Drake announced a release date of September 17, 2013, via Twitter. On the following day, he has released the first trailer for the album, featuring him and his friends drinking alcohol out of his 2012's Grammy Award for Best Rap Album for his previous album Take Care. On August 21, 2013, the album was pushed back one week from its initial release date for September 17, 2013, until September 24, 2013. On September 10, 2013, Drake released the second trailer for the album, featuring "Trophies", which was produced by Hit-Boy. In the video Drake and his entourage drive various luxury cars such as Bentley, Lamborghini and Bugatti's, all sporting small Canadian flags while driving down an empty street.

== Promotion ==
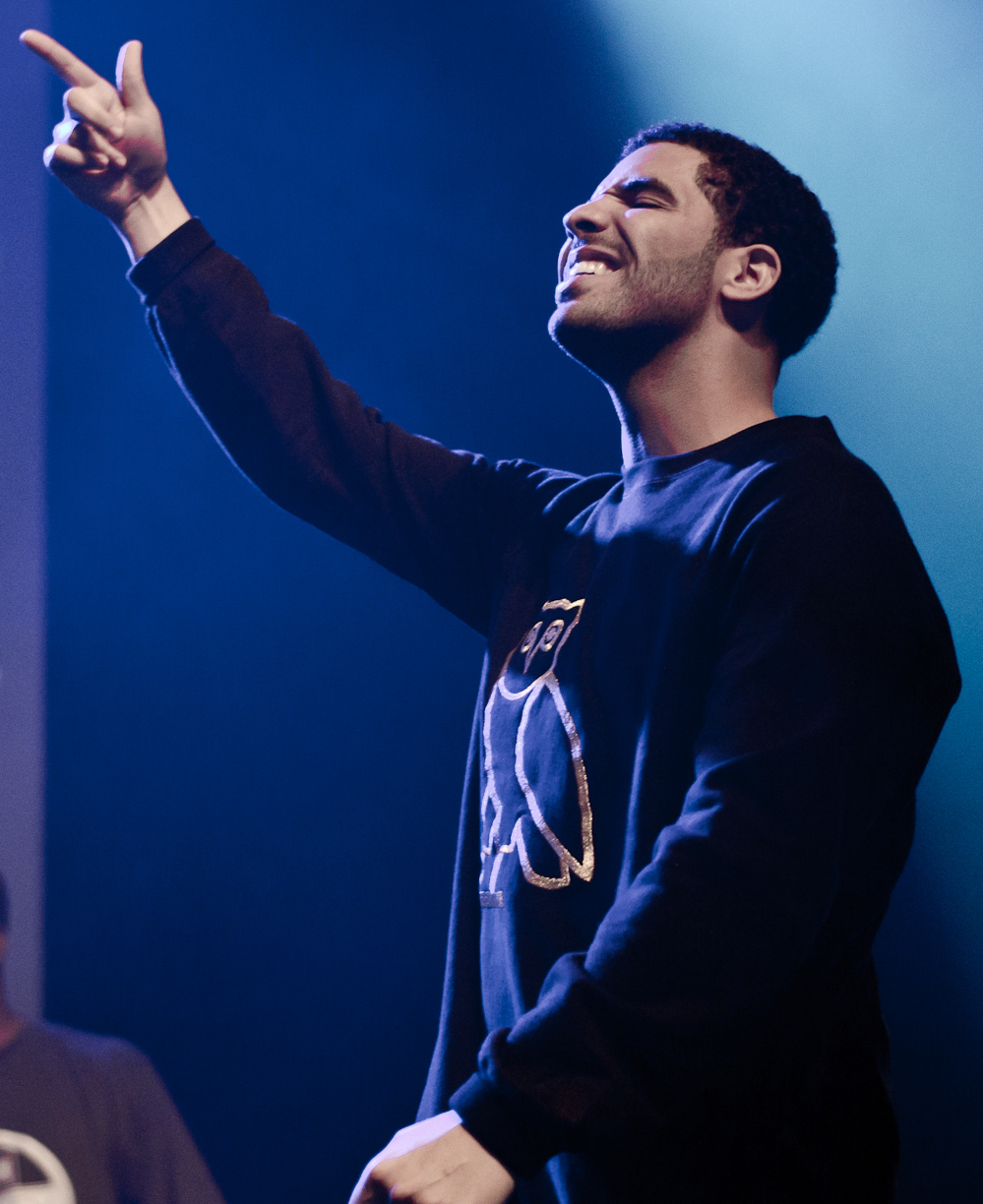
Drake performing while on tour

In March 2013, Drake premiered a song, titled "5AM in Toronto", which is a sequel to the Thank Me Later track "9AM in Dallas". In the same month, he filmed a music video for the song and it was released on April 1, 2013. On April 15, 2013, Drake released two more songs, "No New Friends" (which ended up being a track for DJ Khaled's album Suffering from Success) and "Girls Love Beyoncé", which contains samples from Destiny's Child's song "Say My Name", and the song features guest vocals from James Fauntleroy. On June 17, 2013, an unreleased track, titled "On My Way", which was recorded back in 2010, that had been leaked. This song also features guest appearances from Fauntleroy. On June 22, 2013, Drake released four songs for streaming via his official website. This included collaborations with J. Cole, PartyNextDoor, Migos, and a song titled "The Motion". It was confirmed that these songs were only released in promotion for the album, and did not make the album. However, "The Motion" appeared as a Best Buy bonus track on the album.

On June 18, 2013, Drake announced that he would be going on tour, in support of Nothing Was the Same, starting September 25, 2013, in Portland, Oregon. The tour, titled Would You Like a Tour?, featured supporting acts by singers Future, Miguel and OVO Sound's PartyNextDoor. In the months leading up to the album's release, Drake was featured on the covers of various magazines, such as Billboard, GQ and the 150th issue special of XXL. On September 20, 2013, Drake revealed that he had rescheduled the Would You Like A Tour? due to "an intense rehearsal schedule and technical production requirements that will be part of the show." The tour was rescheduled to begin on October 19, and the first leg ran until December 16, 2013.

== Singles ==
In January 2013, Drake was seen filming a music video for a new song, titled "Started from the Bottom", which was directed by Director X. Drake later announced that he would release the song as the first single for his third album, which happened on the night of the 55th Grammy Awards. The single premiered instead on February 1, 2013, and was released on iTunes, five days later. On February 10, 2013, the music video for "Started from the Bottom" was released. The song charted in many countries, reaching a peak of number six on the US Billboard Hot 100, and has been certified double platinum in the United States by the Recording Industry Association of America (RIAA).

On August 4, 2013, it was revealed that Drake would soon be releasing the second single, titled "Hold On, We're Going Home". The song featuring Majid Jordan, with production by Noah "40" Shebib and Nineteen85, and was released via iTunes on August 7, 2013. On September 24, 2013, the music video was released for "Hold On, We're Going Home". The song peaked at number four on the Billboard Hot 100 and number five on the Canadian Hot 100, respectively.

Drake premiered a song from Nothing Was the Same, titled "All Me", via SoundCloud on August 1, 2013. The song features guest appearances from rappers 2 Chainz and Big Sean, and was produced by Key Wane. On the album's US release date of September 24, 2013, Drake sent "All Me" to urban contemporary radio as the album's third single. The song peaked at number 20 on the Billboard Hot 100.

On September 12, 2013, Drake released the previously announced track, titled "Wu-Tang Forever", as the album's second promotional single, along with the pre-order of Nothing Was the Same on iTunes. The song is a reference to the Wu-Tang Clan and their critically acclaimed double album Wu-Tang Forever (1997). The track also samples their song, "It's Yourz". After the song's release, Wu-Tang Clan member U-God told Vibe, that Wu-Tang Clan members, including himself and Method Man among others, has recorded a remix to the track.

"Pound Cake / Paris Morton Music 2" serves as the album's outro and consists of two songs, "Pound Cake" featuring a guest appearance from Jay-Z and "Paris Morton Music 2" is a sequel to "Paris Morton Music". "Pound Cake" features a significant sample of "C.R.E.A.M.", performed by Wu-Tang Clan and was produced by frequent collaborator Boi-1da. "Pound Cake" was released to radio in the United Kingdom on September 26, 2013, as the album's fourth single, and was subsequently added to the BBC Radio 1Xtra playlist. The song peaked at number 65 on the Billboard Hot 100.

"The Language" was released to mainstream urban radio as the album's fifth single on October 29, 2013. It received many positive reviews, one coming from Nick Cutucci of Entertainment Weekly, which named the song, along with "Hold On, We're Going Home" as one of the album's best songs. Erika Ramirez of Billboard also credited Drake with "arrogantly" reinstating his spot in the rap game with the song. The song was said to be "addressed" and "acting passively" towards rapper Kendrick Lamar's recent diss record, but it was later denied by Birdman, whom appeared to be seen on MTV, prior to the album's release and said that it was not directed towards Lamar. The song peaked at number 51 on the Billboard Hot 100 and number 13 on the US Hot R&B/Hip-Hop Songs, respectively.

"Too Much" was released to urban contemporary radio in the United Kingdom as the album's sixth single on October 31, 2013. On November 11, 2013, the music video was released for the song, "Worst Behavior", the song was released to urban contemporary radio in the United Kingdom as the album's seventh single on June 9, 2014.

== Critical reception ==
Nothing Was the Same ratings
Aggregate scores
Source	Rating
AnyDecentMusic?	7.5/10
Metacritic	79/100
Review scores
Source	Rating
AllMusic	3.5/5 stars
The A.V. Club	B+
Chicago Tribune	3.5/4 stars
Entertainment Weekly	A
The Guardian	4/5 stars
Los Angeles Times	3/4 stars
NME	5/10
Pitchfork	8.6/10
Rolling Stone	4/5 stars
Spin	7/10

Nothing Was the Same was met with generally positive reviews. At Metacritic, which assigns a normalized rating out of 100 to reviews from professional publications, the album received an average score of 79, based on 33 reviews. Aggregator AnyDecentMusic? gave it 7.5 out of 10, based on their assessment of the critical consensus.

Nick Catucci of Entertainment Weekly wrote that Nothing Was the Same "bristles with epiphanies, absurdities, and plenty of bluster, but it's all fodder for a hyperrealistic portrait of Aubrey Drake Graham, not some coronation ceremony." Elysa Gardner of USA Today noted that Drake "continues to juggle bravado with brooding, though he sounds more empowered in the latter." Rolling Stone's Simon Vozick-Levinson wrote, "After a while, his confessions start to sound like sneaky boasts about all the beautiful hearts he's broken. And maybe he wants you to see that contradiction. After all, hiding his flaws has never been Drake's style – they're the whole point."

Pitchfork writer Jayson Greene praised Nothing Was the Same as "Drake and 40's most audacious experiment yet in how far inward they can push their sound; a lot of the album sounds like a black hole of all 40's previous productions being sucked into the center. Song-to-song transitions, which have always been melty and blurry, are more notional than ever." In the Chicago Tribune, critic Greg Kot noted that "Drake's increasing mastery of not just rhyme, but tone and inflection is readily apparent", while Eric Diep of XXL noted Drake's apparent desire on the album "to hold the spot as an innovator". Bonsu Thompson of Vibe felt that while Nothing Was the Same was not a "classic album", "its accomplishments may end up more pivotal. Hip-hop music hasn't been blurred and stretched this wide since Kanye's 808s & Heartbreak."

Evan Rytlewski of The A.V. Club concluded that "if Nothing Was the Same doesn't resonate quite as consistently as Take Care, it's because Drake and his in-house collaborator Noah "40" Shebib sometimes seem content to revisit that album's sonic landscapes instead of carving out new ones." Tim Sendra of AllMusic wrote that the album "doesn't show large amounts of growth, but the small changes to the sound and the slightly wider net his lyrics cast make it worthwhile." Randall Roberts of the Los Angeles Times felt that the album "overwhelms even by Drake's selfie standards, and confirms that just because they're well-marketed and Midwest-palatable doesn't make internal diaries wholly compelling." Aaron Matthews of Exclaim! praised it as a "challenging, uncompromised major label rap album" that is nonetheless "weighed down slightly by the rapper's increasingly solipsistic viewpoint."

=== Rankings ===
Closing out the year, Nothing Was the Same was named to multiple "Best Albums of the Year" lists. XXL named it the best album of 2013. They commented saying, "The OVO general is at his highest point of his career, perfecting his formula of singing and rapping that truly carries the album from start to finish. With 40 in his corner, the pair executed tighter levels of their dark, lush sound that became easily identifiable. The compelling cuts—"From Time", "Too Much", "Hold On, We're Going Home"—as well as obvious anthems like "Started From The Bottom" and "Worst Behaviour" display leaps of growth." Complex named it the second best album of 2013 stating, "it was one of the most anticipated albums of the year, and one that actually lived up to the hype. Nothing Was the Same might not have had a legendary producer on hand to "minimalize" its sound, but it has minimized the discussion of who is the most popular rap star in the world right now." Nick Catucci of Entertainment Weekly also named it the second best album of 2013 saying, "When he gets to flexin' – as on "Worst Behavior," with its Rube Goldberg underpinnings; the MC smackdown "The Language"; and the hypnotic "Started From the Bottom" – he's flawlessly confident. But his restless thoughts keep the elegant music here taut." It was ranked at number 14 on Rolling Stone's list of the 50 best albums of 2013. They commented saying, "Drake is the people's rapper, a smart kid conflicted about his fame, heart, family, everything except his mic potency. But what makes his lonely fantastic voyage matter is its emotional weight, which gets crucial amplification from Noah "40" Shebib's whirlpool beats."

The Guardian placed it at number 31 on their list of the forty best albums of 2013. Exclaim! named it the third best hip hop album of 2013. It was named the ninth best album of 2013 by Slant Magazine. They commented saying, "Drake, the Canadian master of confession-rap, cuts the usual sharp lines, and his lamentations have never felt so knowing, nor more tuneful. He doesn't need a handful of guest MCs, and he doesn't want our sympathy either—just the chance to give us mellow ear-gasms, which he does on nearly every track." It was ranked at number 19 on Consequence's list of the top 50 albums of 2013. Stereogum ranked it at number 28 on their list of the 50 best albums of the year. Spin positioned it at number 50 on their list. Pitchfork ranked Nothing Was the Same as the 41st best album of the decade "so far"—between 2010 and 2014.

=== Industry awards ===
Awards and nominations for Nothing Was the Same
Year	Ceremony	Category	Result	Ref.
2014	BET Hip Hop Awards	Album of the Year	Won	
2014	Grammy Awards	Best Rap Album	Nominated	
2014	Juno Awards	Album of the Year	Nominated	
2014	Juno Awards	Rap Recording of the Year	Won	
2014	Polaris Music Prize	Polaris Music Prize	Longlisted	
2014	Soul Train Music Awards	Best Album of the Year	Nominated	

== Commercial performance ==
Nothing Was the Same debuted at number one on the US Billboard 200, with first-week sales of 658,000 copies. The album has the second highest first week sales of any album in 2013, at the time of its release. It would also be the highest first week sales for a hip hop album since Lil Wayne's Tha Carter IV (2011). In its second week, the album sold 148,000 more copies. In its third week, the album sold 83,000 more copies. In its fourth week, the album continued to remain in the top five on the Billboard 200, selling 58,000 more copies. The album sold 1,344,000 copies in 2013 in the United States, making it the seventh best-selling album of the year. On October 25, 2023, the album was certified six times platinum by the Recording Industry Association of America (RIAA) for combined sales and album-equivalent units of over six million units. As of August 2016, the album has sold 1,783,000 copies in the United States.

The album debuted at number two on the UK Albums Chart, selling 61,000 copies in its first week. It would be Drake's highest debut on the chart and was the fastest selling hip hop album of 2013 in the United Kingdom, at the time of its release. The album also debuted at number one on the main album charts in Canada and Denmark, along with peaking in the top five of the main album charts in Australia, New Zealand and Ireland. The album sold 108,000 copies in Canada in 2013.

== Track listing ==
Nothing Was the Same standard edition
No.	Title	Writer(s)	Producer(s)	Length
1.	"Tuscan Leather"	Aubrey Graham; Noah Shebib; Anthony Palman; David Foster; Linda Thompson	40	6:06
2.	"Furthest Thing"	Graham; Shebib; Palman; Marvin Thomas; Adrian Eccleston	40; Hagler; Jake One^{[c]}	4:27
3.	"Started from the Bottom"	Graham; William Coleman; Shebib	Mike Zombie; 40^{[a]}	2:53
4.	"Wu-Tang Forever"	Graham; Shebib; Palman; Jeremy Rose; Dennis Coles; Robert Diggs; Lamont Hawkins; Jason Hunter; Corey Woods; Thor Baldursson; Mats Bjoerklyn; Juergen Koduletsch	40	3:37
5.	"Own It"	Graham; Noel Fisher; Shebib; Palman; Andre Proctor	Detail; 40^{[a]}	4:11
6.	"Worst Behavior"	Graham; Dacoury Natche; Palman; Fisher	DJ Dahi	4:30
7.	"From Time" (featuring Jhené Aiko)	Graham; Jhené Chilombo; Shebib; Jason Beck	40	5:22
8.	"Hold On, We're Going Home" (featuring Majid Jordan)	Graham; Majid Al Maskati; Jordan Ullman; Paul Jefferies; Shebib	Majid Jordan; Nineteen85; 40^{[c]}	3:47
9.	"Connect"	Graham; Shebib; Ross Birchard; Palman; Kenza Samir	40; Hudson Mohawke^{[c]}	4:56
10.	"The Language"	Graham; Matthew Samuels; Allen Ritter; Anderson Hernandez; Bryan Williams; Palman	Boi-1da; Ritter^{[a]}; Vinylz^{[a]}	3:44
11.	"305 to My City" (featuring Detail)	Graham; Fisher; Proctor	Detail	4:15
12.	"Too Much" (featuring Sampha)	Graham; Sampha Sisay; Jefferies; Emile Haynie	Nineteen85; Sampha	4:21
13.	"Pound Cake / Paris Morton Music 2" (featuring Jay-Z)	Graham; Shawn Carter; Samuels; Jordan Evans; Fisher; Palman; Matthew Burnett; Proctor; Coles; Diggs; Gary Grice; Hawkins; Isaac Hayes; Hunter; Russell Jones; David Porter; Clifford Smith; Woods	Boi-1da; Evans; Detail	7:13
Total length:				59:22

Deluxe edition (bonus tracks)
No.	Title	Writer(s)	Producer(s)	Length
14.	"Come Thru"	Graham; Shebib; Palman; Noel "Gadget" Campbell	40	3:56
15.	"All Me" (featuring 2 Chainz and Big Sean)	Graham; Sean Anderson; Tauheed Epps; Dwane Weir; Palman; Jacques Charles; Maurice Yvain; Albert Willemetz	Key Wane; 40^{[a]}	4:31
Total length:				67:53

Best Buy deluxe edition and international deluxe edition bonus track
No.	Title	Writer(s)	Producer(s)	Length
16.	"The Motion"	Graham; Sisay; Shebib	Sampha; 40	4:01
Total length:				71:54

Notes

- ^{^[c]} signifies a co-producer
- ^{^[a]} signifies an additional producer

Sample credits

- "Tuscan Leather" contains an interpolation of "Serious", written by Warren McGlone and Lawrence Parker; a sample of "I Have Nothing", written by David Foster and Linda Thompson, as performed by Whitney Houston; and a sample of "When Seasons Change" (live), as performed by Curtis Mayfield.
- "Started from the Bottom" contains a sample from the composition Ambessence Piano & Drones, written and performed by Bruno Sanfilippo.
- "Wu-Tang Forever" contains a sample of "It's Yourz", written by Dennis Coles, Robert Diggs, Lamont Hawkins, Jason Hunter, Corey Woods, Thor Baldursson, Mats Bjoerklyn and Juergen Koduletsch, as performed by Wu-Tang Clan; and a sample of "Loss Config", as performed by Zodiac Beats.
- "Own It" contains an interpolation of "Wu-Tang Forever".
- "Too Much" contains a sample of "Too Much", written by Sampha and Emile Haynie, as performed by Sampha.
- "Pound Cake / Paris Morton Music 2" contains an interpolation of "C.R.E.A.M.", written by Dennis Coles, Robert Diggs, Gary Grice, Lamont Hawkins, Isaac Hayes, Jason Hunter, Russell Jones, David Porter, Clifford Smith and Corey Woods, as performed by Wu-Tang Clan; a sample of "Don't Say a Word", written by Jim Eliot and Ellie Goulding, as performed by Ellie Goulding; and a sample of "Jimmy Smith Rap", as performed by Jimmy Smith.
- "All Me" contains a sample of "My Man", written by Jacques Charles, Maurice Yvain and Albert Lucien Willemetz, as performed by Abbey Lincoln.

== Personnel ==
Credits adapted from the album's liner notes.

- Jhené Aiko – vocals (track 7)
- Chris Athens – mastering
- Les Bateman – system engineer
- Adrian Bent – replay musician (track 2)
- Noel Cadastre – engineer (tracks 1, 2, 5, 6, 10–13), assistant engineer (tracks 3, 4, 8, 9, 14, 15), mixing assistant (track 16)
- Noel "Gadget" Campbell – mixing (tracks 1–15)
- Cappadonna – background vocals (track 1)
- Dwayne "Lil Wayne" Carter – executive producer
- Rachel Craig – background vocals (tracks 2, 8)
- Jeff Crake – assistant engineer (tracks 1, 8, 11)
- Detail – producer and engineer (tracks 5, 11), vocals (track 11)
- Adrian "X" Eccleston – guitar (tracks 1, 2)
- Oliver El-Khatib – executive producer
- Jordan Evans – producer (track 13)
- Grace Gayle – background vocals (track 8)
- Chris Godbey – engineer (track 13)
- Chilly Gonzales – piano (track 7)
- G Koop – replay musician (track 2)
- Aubrey Drake Graham – vocals, executive producer
- Brian Hamilton – background vocals (tracks 2, 8)
- Emile Haynie – engineer (track 12)
- Donald Hearn – art direction, design
- Maximilian Jaeger – assistant engineer (track 15)
- Jake One – co-producer and drum programming (track 2)
- Jay-Z – vocals (track 13)
- Paul "Nineteen85" Jeffries – producer and instrumentation (tracks 8, 12), additional drum programming (track 1)
- Michael Kalin – mixing assistant (track 3)
- Rob Kinelski – engineer (track 15)
- Shawn Lawrence – background vocals (track 9)
- Owen Lee – background vocals (track 2)
- Luke Leveille – assistant engineer (tracks 1, 3, 4, 9, 14, 16)
- Deborah Mannis-Gardner – sample clearance
- Majid Al Maskati – producer and vocals (track 8)
- Greg Moffett – assistant engineer (tracks 5, 6, 12)
- Hudson Mohawke – co-producer and additional instrumentation (track 9)
- Dacoury "DJ Dahi" Natche – producer and instrumentation (track 6)
- Kadir Nelson – cover art
- John Nettlesbey – assistant engineer (track 1)
- PartyNextDoor – background vocals (tracks 5, 14)
- Christian Plata – vocal engineer (track 7)
- J. Prince – executive producer
- Jas Prince – executive producer
- Omar Richards – background vocals (tracks 2, 8)
- Allen Ritter – additional production (track 10)
- Isa Saalabi – art direction, design
- Matthew "Boi-1da" Samuels – producer (tracks 10, 13), additional drum programming (track 1)
- Travis Savoury Baka AKA "Not Nice" – background vocals (track 7)
- Les Schaeffer – assistant engineer (track 13)
- Miguel Scott – assistant engineer (track 1)
- Big Sean – vocals (track 15)
- Travis Sewchan – engineer (track 8), assistant engineer (tracks 5–7, 10–13)
- Noah "40" Shebib – producer (tracks 1, 2, 4, 7, 9, 14, 16), engineer (tracks 1–5, 7–11, 13–16), instrumentation (tracks 1, 4, 7, 9, 14), co-producer (track 8), additional production (tracks 3, 5, 15), mixing (tracks 8, 15, 16), pianos (track 2), additional keyboards (tracks 3, 5, 8, 16), additional drums (track 16), executive producer
- Patricia Shirley – background vocals (tracks 2, 8)
- Sampha Sisay – producer and instrumentation (tracks 12, 16)
- David "Gordo" Strickland – assistant engineer (track 10)
- Dalton Tennant – replay musician (track 2)
- Marvin "Hagler" Thomas – producer and drum programming (track 2)
- Trae tha Truth – background vocals (track 9)
- Jennifer Tulloch – background vocals (track 2)
- 2 Chainz – vocals (track 15)
- Jordan Ullman – producer and instrumentation (track 8)
- Deborah Vernal – background vocals (tracks 2, 8)
- Vinylz – additional production (track 10)
- Brian Warfield – vocal engineer (track 7)
- Lindsey Warner – mixing assistant (tracks 1, 9)
- Dwane "Key Wane" Weir – producer and instrumentation (track 15)
- Finis "KY" White – engineer (track 15)
- Bryan "Baby Birdman" Williams – executive producer
- Ronald "Slim Tha Don" Williams – executive producer
- Dionne Wilson – background vocals (track 8)
- Mike Zombie – producer and instrumentation (track 3)

== Charts ==
=== Weekly charts ===
Weekly chart performance
Chart (2013)	Peak position
Australian Albums (ARIA)	2
Austrian Albums (Ö3 Austria)	25
Belgian Albums (Ultratop Flanders)	11
Belgian Albums (Ultratop Wallonia)	28
Canadian Albums (Billboard)	1
Danish Albums (Hitlisten)	1
Dutch Albums (Album Top 100)	8
French Albums (SNEP)	11
German Albums (Offizielle Top 100)	14
Irish Albums (IRMA)	4
Italian Albums (FIMI)	66
Japanese Albums (Oricon)	83
New Zealand Albums (RMNZ)	4
Norwegian Albums (VG-lista)	13
Scottish Albums (Official Charts)	4
Spanish Albums (Promusicae)	91
Swedish Albums (Sverigetopplistan)	10
Swiss Albums (Schweizer Hitparade)	11
UK Albums (Official Charts)	2
UK R&B Albums (Official Charts)	1
US Billboard 200	1
US Top R&B/Hip-Hop Albums (Billboard)	1

=== Year-end charts ===
Year-end chart performance
Chart (2013)	Position
Australian Urban Albums (ARIA)	14
Belgian Albums (Ultratop Flanders)	160
Canadian Albums (Billboard)	19
Swedish Albums (Sverigetopplistan)	78
UK Albums (OCC)	53
US Billboard 200	11
US Top R&B/Hip-Hop Albums (Billboard)	3

Year-end chart performance
Chart (2014)	Position
Australian Urban Albums (ARIA)	37
Swedish Albums (Sverigetopplistan)	89
US Billboard 200	25
US Top R&B/Hip-Hop Albums (Billboard)	3

Year-end chart performance
Chart (2015)	Position
Australian Urban Albums (ARIA)	100
Danish Albums (Hitlisten)	88
US Billboard 200	69
US Top R&B/Hip-Hop Albums (Billboard)	79

Year-end chart performance
Chart (2016)	Position
Danish Albums (Hitlisten)	86
US Billboard 200	68

Year-end chart performance
Chart (2017)	Position
US Billboard 200	105
US Top R&B/Hip-Hop Albums (Billboard)	91

Year-end chart performance
Chart (2018)	Position
US Billboard 200	111

Year-end chart performance
Chart (2019)	Position
US Billboard 200	154

Year-end chart performance
Chart (2020)	Position
US Billboard 200	159

Year-end chart performance
Chart (2021)	Position
US Billboard 200	143

Year-end chart performance
Chart (2022)	Position
US Billboard 200	132

Year-end chart performance
Chart (2023)	Position
US Billboard 200	153

=== Decade-end charts ===
Decade-end chart performance
Chart (2010–2019)	Position
US Billboard 200	72

== Certifications ==
Certifications
Region	Certification	Certified units/sales
Australia (ARIA)	Platinum	70,000^{‡}
Canada (Music Canada)	3× Platinum	240,000^{‡}
Denmark (IFPI Danmark)	Platinum	20,000^{‡}
New Zealand (RMNZ)	2× Platinum	30,000^{‡}
Sweden (GLF)	Gold	15,000^{‡}
United Kingdom (BPI)	2× Platinum	600,000^{‡}
United States (RIAA)	7× Platinum	7,000,000^{‡}
^{‡} Sales+streaming figures based on certification alone.

== Release history ==
Release dates and formats
Region	Date	Label(s)	Format(s)	Ref.
Australia	September 20, 2013	Cash Money; Republic	CD; digital download	
Belgium	September 20, 2013	Cash Money; Republic	CD; digital download	
Denmark	September 20, 2013	Cash Money; Republic	CD; digital download	
France	September 20, 2013	Cash Money; Republic	CD; digital download	
Germany	September 20, 2013	Cash Money; Republic	CD; digital download	
Ireland	September 20, 2013	Cash Money; Republic	CD; digital download	
Italy	September 20, 2013	Cash Money; Republic	CD; digital download	
Netherlands	September 20, 2013	Cash Money; Republic	CD; digital download	
New Zealand	September 20, 2013	Cash Money; Republic	CD; digital download	
Norway	September 20, 2013	Cash Money; Republic	CD; digital download	
Spain	September 20, 2013	Cash Money; Republic	CD; digital download	
Sweden	September 20, 2013	Cash Money; Republic	CD; digital download	
Switzerland	September 20, 2013	Cash Money; Republic	CD; digital download	
United Kingdom	September 20, 2013	Cash Money; Republic	CD; digital download	
Canada	September 24, 2013	Young Money; Cash Money; Republic	CD; digital download	
United States	September 24, 2013	Young Money; Cash Money; Republic	CD; digital download	
