= Wu-Tang Forever (Drake song) =

Promotional single by Drake

from the album Nothing Was the Same
- Released: September 12, 2013
- Recorded: 2013
- Genre: Hip hop
- Length: 3:37
- Label: OVO; Young Money; Cash Money; Republic
- Songwriters: Aubrey Graham, Anthony Palman, Noah Shebib, Jeremy Rose, Dennis Coles, Robert Diggs, Lamont Hawkins, Jason Hunter, Corey Woods, Thor Baldursson, Mats Bjoerklyn, Juergen Koduletsch
- Producer: Noah "40" Shebib

"Wu-Tang Forever" is a song by Canadian rapper Drake from his third studio album Nothing Was the Same (2013). The song was released as the album's first promotional single on September 12, 2013. "Wu-Tang Forever" features a significant sample of "It's Yourz" by the Wu-Tang Clan, and uncredited background vocals by Jhené Aiko. The song was produced by frequent collaborator Noah "40" Shebib. The song has since peaked at number 52 on the Billboard Hot 100 chart.

== Background ==
On August 30, 2013, Drake first revealed he would have a song featured on the album, produced by 40 and titled "Wu-Tang Forever". On September 12, 2013, Drake released the previously announced "Wu-Tang Forever", as the album's first promotional single along with the pre-order of Nothing Was the Same on iTunes. The song is a reference to the Wu-Tang Clan and their critically acclaimed double album Wu-Tang Forever (1997). The track also samples the Clan's song "It's Yourz". Wu-Tang Clan leader RZA said he gave Drake the sample free of charge.

The song pays homage to the hip hop collective Wu-Tang Clan, even though the song is primarily about women and relationships. The Clan initially responded positively to the song via their official Twitter. However, Wu-Tang member Inspectah Deck commented on the song after listening to it saying, "[...] It is in no form a tribute to WU and SHOULD NOT wear the title Wutang Forever!" He later elaborated saying, "I felt it didn't have no bearing on the Wu-Tang Clan or Wu-Tang Forever for that matter. Besides the [fact that] I heard him say, 'Young brother on his Wu Tang.' That in itself gives respect to the Clan. I'm not taking that from the brother. Whatever his intentions was, I'm not saying that I'm feeling that he had some deliberate snake intentions. I'm saying that I disagree with the title of that song being 'Wu-Tang Forever' when it has no bearing on Wu-Tang Clan despite the fact that the 'It's Yourz' sample floatin' in the background. We sampled 'It's Yourz'. That's a sample. That's there for the taking. It's not like, Oh, he used y'all sample. We both used it from T La Rock."

== Critical reception ==
"Wu-Tang Forever" was met with generally positive reviews from music critics, however it did receive a mixed response for not being anything similar to or representing the Wu-Tang Clan. David Amidon of PopMatters said, " "Wu-Tang Forever" is such a great song to talk about for everything but that title. That beat, all spiraling keyboards straight out of an Akira Yamaoka nightmare swallowed whole every few moments by the loneliest 808 note in the world, bellowing to the surface like the reverb of a depth charge. And in that atmosphere Drake lashes out at the world in complete self-awareness, using this track to stake claim on Toronto the way Wu-Tang Forever claimed Staten Island, to turn the narrowed street attitude of '90s New York rap into broad-stroked, wide-eyed confessionals without dropping the veil of conviction that allowed the Wu-Tang Clan to remain perhaps hip-hop's most iconic entity, something to be celebrated by the genre's "softest" artist on the 20th anniversary of the "hardest" rap album ever made."

Andrew Barker of Variety said, "while the title "Wu-Tang Forever" might first appear to be a bit of rap-blogger trolling coming from a sweater-clad Canadian often derided for his softness, the song is actually a rather thoughtful rumination on growing up obsessed by gangsta braggadocio while living at a safe remove from the mean streets of Compton, Bed-Stuy or Shaolin." Jon Caramanica of New York Times called the song a "blustery rough-edged love song." Bryant Kitching of Consequence of Sound said the song featured Drake's "most poised rhyming to date."

Paul Macinnes of The Guardian praised 40's production work on the song. Jesal 'Jay Soul' Padania of Rapreviews.com called the song an "intelligently balanced tune that leads seamlessly into a future concert anthem for the ladies, "Own It"." Simon Vozick-Levinson of Rolling Stone gave the song a more mixed review saying, "despite featuring a ghostly snippet of the Wu-Tang Clan's 1997 single 'It's Yourz', sounds nothing like the Clan – it's a heartfelt requiem for a girl he used to know. 'I just love when I'm with you', the Toronto star sighs, in a rueful tone that's hard to imagine coming from Raekwon or ODB, or any other mainstream MC in the past 20 years, for that matter."

== Music video ==
The music video for "Wu-Tang Forever" was filmed in Harlem during January 2014. ASAP Rocky makes a significant cameo appearance in the video. As of May 2017, the video remains unreleased.

== Remix ==
Two days after the song's release, Wu-Tang Clan member U-God told Vibe that the whole Wu-Tang Clan, had recorded verses over the track not knowing if it would be for the official version or the remix. The members had recorded their verses earlier in the year while on their European 20th anniversary concert tour. On September 21, 2013, Drake confirmed the remix, stating it would be released soon.

On September 23, 2013, Inspectah Deck told HipHopDX that he would not be featured on the remix, but knew that at least U-God, Method Man, Masta Killa and Cappadonna recorded verses for the remix. Raekwon also revealed in early October 2013, that he would be featured on the remix.

On January 16, 2016, via OVO Sound radio, A$AP Mob's Cozy Boys (A$AP Lou and J. Scott) shared an exclusive mix featuring an unreleased verse from A$AP Rocky.

== Chart performance ==
Chart (2013)	Peak position
Canada Hot 100 (Billboard)	44
US Billboard Hot 100	52
US Hot R&B/Hip-Hop Songs (Billboard)	13
