= Tuscan Leather =

2013 song performed by Drake

Song by Drake

from the album Nothing Was the Same
- Recorded: Noble Street Studios (Toronto, Ontario); Metalworks Studios (Mississauga, Ontario); Tree Sound Studios (Atlanta, Georgia); Marvin's Room (Hollywood, California)
- Genre: Hip hop
- Length: 6:06
- Label: OVO Sound; Young Money; Cash Money; Republic
- Songwriters: Aubrey Graham; Anthony Palman; Noah Shebib; David Foster; Linda Thompson-Jenner
- Producers: Noah "40" Shebib; Nathan Sessoms

"Tuscan Leather" is a song by Canadian recording artist Drake for his third studio album, Nothing Was the Same (2013). It was written by Drake along with Anthony Palma and Noah Shebib, who produced the song under his production name "40" along with Nathan Sessoms. The song heavily samples "I Have Nothing" performed by Whitney Houston and written by David Foster and Linda Thompson-Jenner, who received writing credits on "Tuscan Leather". Noted for its unique song structure devoid of any choruses, it is a hip hop song which utilizes influences of R&B and ambient throughout its composition.

"Tuscan Leather" received critical acclaim from music critics, who highlighted the song's production and praised Drake's growing confidence. The song was a source of controversy due to the song's lyrics describing Drake's deteriorating relationship with label mate Nicki Minaj. Despite not being released as a single, "Tuscan Leather" managed to chart due to the release of the album, with its highest peak being at number 23 on the U.S. Billboard Hot Rap Songs.

== Background ==
"Tuscan Leather" was written by Drake, Anthony Palman and Noah Shebib, and was produced by Drake's longtime collaborator Noah "40" Shebib. It borrows its name from the Tom Ford fragrance of the same name, which generally ranges from $220-$535. The song utilizes a vocal sample from "I Have Nothing", written by David Foster and Linda Thompson-Jenner, who receive writing credits, and performed by Whitney Houston. It also contains interpolations of "Serious", written by Warren McGlone and Lawrence Parker, and samples "When Seasons Change" (live) by Curtis Mayfield.

It was recorded at Noble Street Studios in Toronto and Metalworks Studios in Mississauga, Ontario, along with Tree Sound Studios in Atlanta, Georgia and Marvin's Room in Hollywood, California. "Tuscan Leather" was recorded by Shebib and Noel Cadastre, while the pair received assistance from Luke Neveille, Jeff Crake, Miguel Scott, and John Nettlesbey. Lindsey Warner assisted Noel "Gadget" Campbell Toronto's Studio 306 in mixing the song. Background vocals for the song were provided by Cappadonna, while Shebib handled all the instrumentation. However, Adrian "X" Eccleston played the guitar, and additional drum programming was done by Matthew "Boi-1da" Samuels and Nineteen85.

== Composition ==
Musically, "Tuscan Leather" is an atmospheric and free-form hip hop song, which contains elements of R&B and ambient, and features "woozy" synth washes, big drum sounds, and an expansive, engrossing beat. Structurally, "Tuscan Leather" revolves around a distorted sample of "I Have Nothing" by Whitney Houston chopped, sped-up, and reversed three different ways. Will Lavin of Gigwise said the song sounded "like a Heatmakerz-produced track circa 2001, the three key beat changes keeps listeners plugged in to the transparent mood Drake finds himself in." "Tuscan Leather" has a unique song structure, with three distinct sections and no choruses. The first section features Drake intensely rapping while Houston's voice, described as "ghostly and beautiful", floats as if on helium through the chaotic production, noted to be "nostalgic, new, exuberant and menacing" all at once. After a brief pause, the section showcases a shift in both the beat and the lyrics, becoming more sinuous and personal, while a gentle keyboard riff rises underneath the music. During the third verse, the music transforms into a "soft, ambient landscape" which includes crowd noise, before the song finishes with the voice of Curtis Mayfield addressing fans at the end of a 1987 concert in Montreux:

As hell below, I'll see you when you get there
Are you enjoying yourself?
If we may we'd just like to close off with something a bit inspirational
Hopefully something a bit relevant as to us all
Are having the same fears, shedding similar tears
And of course dying in so many years
It don't mean that we can't have a good life
So we'd like to just maybe close out with something, some food for thought

According to Andrew Unterberger of Popdust, "Tuscan Leather" is a hyper-focused state-of-the-union address about where he is at in his life. During the song he discusses his ever-expanding ambitions in lines such as "On a mission tryna shift the culture", while also dismissing those who try to challenge his supremacy: "Just give it time, we’ll see who's still around a decade from now". During the song Drake makes multiple pop culture references including Dwight Howard, University of Nevada, Las Vegas basketball, comparisons to Guy Pearce in Memento, and details of dates with Tatyana Ali. The song's lyrics also allude to a strained relationship with his label YMCMB, while some critics noted a subliminal diss towards J. Cole.

== Controversy ==
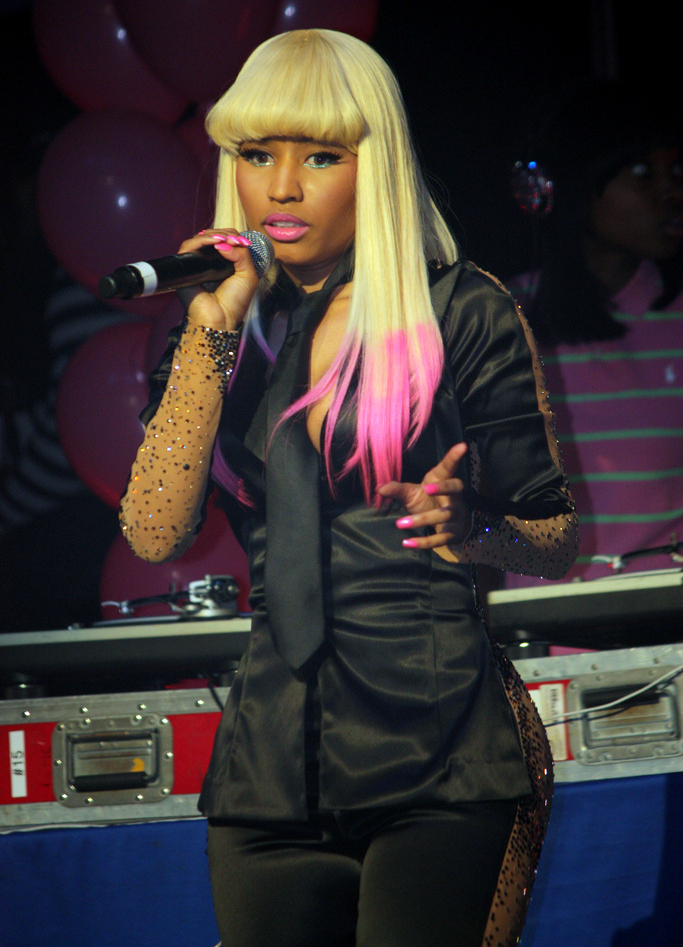
The song generated tension between Drake and label-mate Nicki Minaj (pictured).

"Tuscan Leather" generated controversy with label mate Nicki Minaj for the line: "Not even talkin' to Nicki, communication is breakin' / I dropped the ball on some personal shit, I need to embrace it / I'm honest, I make mistakes, I'd be the second to admit it / Think that's why I need her in my life, to check me when I'm trippin'". Speaking of the line, Drake said in an interview with MTV News: "That line in 'Tuscan Leather' isn't exactly where I am in my life right now, but like a year ago...eight months, seven months ago, it was how I felt, I'd done something wrong, and I wasn't speaking to her."

Throughout their careers Drake and Minaj maintained a close personal and business relationship, and were frequent collaborators. However, while recording Nothing Was the Same, Drake did not work with Minaj or anyone from Cash Money Records, leading her to say: "I'm Young Money 'til the death of me, Drake can do what Drake do, but Nicki Minaj is a whole different person. I think your team is your team. Who gives a fuck about trying to be different? I'm always going to want my team to be a part of my project, no matter what, in some way."

Speaking of their strained relationship during an interview with Hot 97.5, Minaj said: "It gets a little hard to have a real connection when people are on different sides of the world, working on different things. You just never know who people got in their ear or what they're feeling or maybe they felt wronged in some way. I don't know. I just know that Drake is my baby, and Wayne is my everything." However, Drake said their relationship has improved, and credited the song as opening up a new dialogue, saying: "I think the dialogue actually between us was already opened up, I had already solved that issue. I wrote that a while ago, and I kinda felt guilty changing it. It was a sentiment that I had when I started this album and felt like that's how it should be. The album should start one place and end in another...I haven't talked to her since it's been out. I'm not sure. I haven't spoke to her."

== Critical reception ==
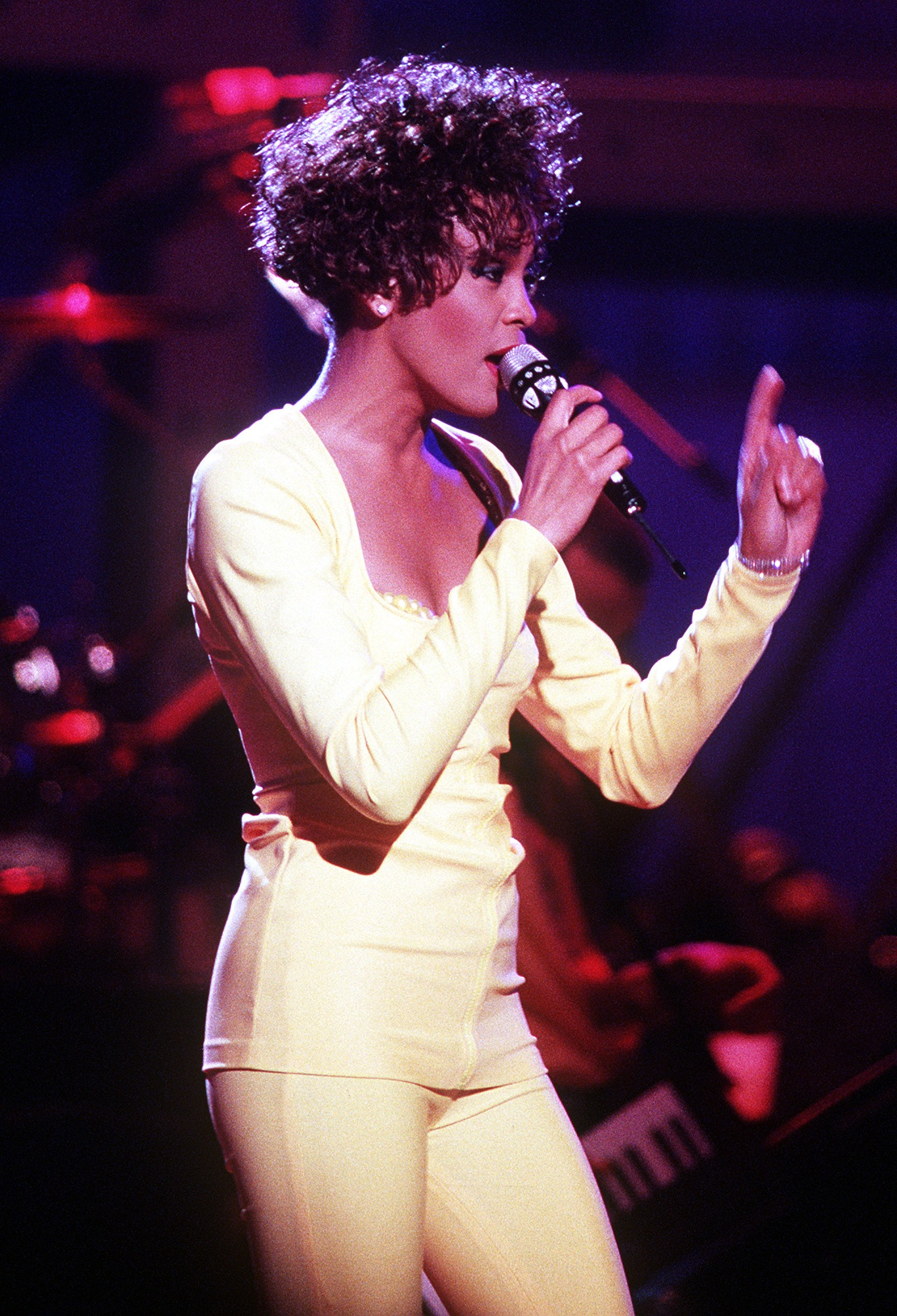
Critics praised the use of the Whitney Houston sample (pictured).

Upon release, "Tuscan Leather" received widespread critical acclaim from music critics, with it being recognized as one of the most powerful intros to a hip-hop album in years. In her review of the album, Erika Ramirez of Billboard said of the song: "Drake is aware of his greatness, and makes sure listeners are just as aware from the jump." Andrew Unterberger of Popdust commended the song for being a strong opener, similar to his other album opener's; "Fireworks" and "Over My Dead Body". Unterberger praised the use of the Whitney Houston sample, and finished his review as saying: "How much time is Drake spending on the intro? As much time as he goddamn pleases, and if he wants to go an hour on the beat, we’ll listen for the whole thing and not check our watch once." Writing for Spin, Brandon Soderberg included "Tuscan Leather" as one of the "Rap Songs of the Week", calling it "expertly conceptualized" and praised it as properly introducing the album. Will Lavin of Gigwise gave the song a positive review, noting Drake's in depth discussions about his label, his friends, and his peers. Lavin went on to say: "For Drake, when it comes to album openers, his track record is thought provokingly flawless."

Thomas Britt of PopMatters praised the production on "Tuscan Leather" and noted a rare self-aware "utterance" that positions Drake next to a movie character". The A.V. Club's Evan Rytlewski said the song: "opens the record with a six-minute rush of beat flips and kinetic spitting, a reminder of how well Drake can rap when a track demands it." The Globe and Mail reviewer Brad Wheeler said that Drake was "rewriting the rules" by including no choruses, and called Shebib and Drake's work on the track "bodacious". David Berry of the National Post called "Tuscan Leather" the best song on Nothing Was the Same, praising Drake's smart wordplay and Shebib "going Picasso" on a Whitney Houston sample. Writing for Idolator, Bianca Gracie said the song showed a more confident Drake, noting that he channels Jay-Z with "bold lyrics" and a "dizzying production" reminiscent of Kanye West circa 2004. Robert Copsy of Digital Spy also noted a significant growth in confidence, and called the song: "a piece of atmospheric self-reflection that sets up his current mindset: an artist with plenty of ambition but with a constant nagging fear about losing his way."

== Credits and personnel ==
Recording

- Recorded at Noble Street Studios in Toronto, Metalworks Studios in Mississauga, Ontario, Tree Sound Studios in Atlanta, Georgia, and Marvin's Room in Hollywood, California.
- Mixed at Studio 306 in Toronto, Ontario.

Sample

- Contains a sample of "I Have Nothing" performed by Whitney Houston and written by David Foster and Linda Thompson-Jenner.
- Contains interpolations of "Serious" written by Warren McGlone and Lawrence Parker.
- Contains samples from "When Seasons Change (Live)" by Curtis Mayfield.

Personnel

- Songwriting – Aubrey Graham, Anthony Palman, Noah Shebib, David Foster, Linda Thompson-Jenner
- Production – Noah "40" Shebib
- Recording – Noah Shebib, Noel Cadastre
- Recording assistant – Luke Leveille, Jeff Crake, Miguel Scott, John Nettlesbey
- Mixing – Noel "Gadget" Campbell
- Mixing assistant – Lindsey Warner
- Vocals – Drake
- Background vocals – Cappadonna
- Instruments – Noah Shebib
- Guitar – Adrian "X" Eccleston
- Additional drum programming – Matthew "Boi-1da" Samuels, Nineteen85

Credits adapted from the liner notes of Nothing Was the Same, OVO Sound, Young Money, Cash Money, Republic.

== Charts ==
Despite not being released as a single, "Tuscan Leather" managed to enter a handful of charts worldwide. During the week of October 5, 2013, the song debuted and peaked at number 183 the UK Singles Chart. In the United States, "Tuscan Leather" debuted and peaked at number 81 on the Billboard Hot 100, number 33 on the Billboard Hot R&B/Hip-Hop Songs.

Chart (2013)	Peak position
UK Singles (Official Charts Company)	183
US Billboard Hot 100	81
US Hot R&B/Hip-Hop Songs (Billboard)	33
