= Too Much (Drake song) =

2013 single by Drake featuring Sampha

Single by Drake featuring Sampha

from the album Nothing Was the Same
- Released: October 31, 2013
- Genre: Hip hop
- Length: 4:21
- Label: Young Money; Cash Money; Republic
- Songwriters: Aubrey Graham; Sampha Sisay; Paul Jefferies; Emile Haynie
- Producers: Nineteen85; Sampha

Drake singles chronology
"The Language" (2013)	"Too Much" (2013)	"Odio" (2014)

Sampha singles chronology
"Indecision" (2013)	"Too Much" (2013)	"Temporary View" (2014)

"Too Much" is a song by Canadian hip hop recording artist Drake from his third studio album Nothing Was the Same (2013). "Too Much" features vocals from English singer Sampha and contains samples from his track of the same name. The song was later released as the sixth overall single from Nothing Was the Same in the United Kingdom on December 9, 2013. Prior to its release, it was added to the playlists of UK radio stations BBC Radio 1Xtra and BBC Radio 1 on October 31, 2013, and November 25, 2013, respectively. Sampha also released his solo version of the song on November 12, 2013 through Young Turks (now Young).

== Critical reception ==
"Too Much" was met with generally positive reviews from music critics. David Amidon of PopMatters wrote that it was "hard... not to look at 'Too Much' as the brief return of the album we really want from Drake. This is the sort of song where everything comes together in such new, glimmering ways as to validate any claims Drake makes to shifting the game around on opener 'Tuscan Leather'." Tim Sendra of AllMusic called "Too Much" a "brilliant combination of brag rap and quiet storm balladry." Julia Leconte of Now praised its production as "beautiful." Evan Rytlewski of The A.V. Club opined that the song "is beautiful in its achy simplicity."

== Charts ==
Chart (2013)	Peak position
Canada Hot 100 (Billboard)	90
UK Singles Chart	86
UK Hip Hop/R&B (OCC)	14
US Billboard Hot 100	64
US Hot R&B/Hip-Hop Songs (Billboard)	23

== Certifications ==
Region	Certification	Certified units/sales
Australia (ARIA)	Gold	35,000^{‡}
New Zealand (RMNZ)	Gold	15,000^{‡}
United Kingdom (BPI)	Silver	200,000^{‡}
United States (RIAA)	Platinum	1,000,000^{‡}
^{‡} Sales+streaming figures based on certification alone.

== Release history ==
Country	Date	Format	Label
United Kingdom	October 31, 2013	Urban contemporary	Young Money; Cash Money; Republic
United Kingdom	December 9, 2013	Contemporary hit radio	Young Money; Cash Money; Republic

== Sampha version ==
"Too Much"

Single by Sampha
- Released: November 12, 2013
- Studio: Metropolis Studios
- Length: 2:58
- Label: Young Turks
- Songwriter: Sampha Sisay
- Producer: Emile Haynie

Sampha singles chronology
"Indecision" (2013)	"Too Much" (2013)	"Temporary View" (2014)

Sampha released his version of the song on November 12, 2013, two months after Drake's third album Nothing Was The Same was released.
