= Thor Baldursson =

Thor Baldursson Þórir Baldursson
- Born: Þórir Valgeir Baldursson; March 29, 1944 (age 82); Keflavík, Iceland
- Origin: Icelandic
- Genres: Folk, Disco
- Occupation: Musician
- Instruments: Keyboard, varuous
- Years active: 1958-present
- Labels: SG Hljómplötur, SalSoul Records, Casablanca Records
- Formerly of: Savanna Tríó, Gaz
- Spouse: Guðrún Pálsdóttir

Thor Baldursson (born Þórir Baldursson in 1944) is an Icelandic composer, organist, arranger and producer. He is best known for his work with Giorgio Moroder, and records with Donna Summer, Grace Jones and Elton John. The 1978 Disco-funk track Sing Sing by his band Gaz became a sought after sample, its rhythm appearing on a number of hits to this day, giving Baldursson songwriting credits on tracks by Drake (Wu-Tang Forever), Dua Lipa, Kylie Minogue and more. That sample is the foundation block of the Baltimore Club genre of music.

Baldursson grew up in Keflavík, close to the US military base that ran the international airport. The American radio broadcasts from the base were a heavy influence on him. His first successes were locally, with his band Savanna Tríó, who released a number of folk records between 1962 and 1967.

He moved to Sweden in 1970, and to Germany in 1972. While in Germany he started working with Giorgio Moroder and Pete Belotte, as their arranger, as well as some production and instrumentation. He also conducted the Salsoul Orchestra.
