= Pound Cake / Paris Morton Music 2 =

Single by Drake featuring Jay-Z

from the album Nothing Was the Same
- Released: September 26, 2013
- Recorded: 2013
- Genre: Hip hop
- Length: 7:13
- Label: Young Money; Cash Money; Republic
- Songwriters: Aubrey Graham; Shawn Carter; Anthony Palman; Matthew Samuels; Noel Fisher; Matthew Burnett; Jordan Evans; A. Proctor; Robert Diggs; Gary Grice; Lamont Hawkins; Isaac Hayes; Dennis Coles; Jason Hunter; Russell Jones; David Porter; Clifford Smith; Corey Woods
- Producers: Boi-1da; Jordan Evans

Drake singles chronology
"All Me" (2013)	"Pound Cake / Paris Morton Music 2" (2013)	"The Language" (2013)

Jay-Z singles chronology
"Higher" (2013)	"Pound Cake" (2013)	"Tom Ford" (2013)

"Pound Cake / Paris Morton Music 2" is a song by Canadian rapper Drake from his third studio album Nothing Was the Same released in 2013. The track consists of two songs, "Pound Cake" featuring a guest appearance by Jay-Z, and "Paris Morton Music 2", a sequel to "Paris Morton Music". The track serves as the outro to the standard edition of Nothing Was the Same.

"Pound Cake" features a significant sample of "Don't Say A Word" by Ellie Goulding, "Jimmy Smith Rap" by Jimmy Smith, as well as "C.R.E.A.M." by the Wu-Tang Clan, and was produced by frequent collaborator Boi-1da and Jordan Evans. "Paris Morton Music 2" was produced by Detail. The track peaked at number 65 on the US Billboard Hot 100 chart. "Pound Cake" was later serviced to radio in the United Kingdom on September 26, 2013, as the album's fourth single, and was subsequently added to the BBC Radio 1Xtra playlist.

== Background ==
In September 2013, Drake appeared on the cover of Billboard, where in the interview he stated he had two Jay-Z verses on the outro track of Nothing Was the Same. Jay-Z sent Drake his two verses a cappella for "Pound Cake", who Noah "40" Shebib" created a beat for, but Drake decided was not right for the song. OVO Sound producer Boi-1da then created an instrumental that Drake decided to use for the song. Following that, he sent "Pound Cake" to Jay-Z, who wanted to use the song for his twelfth studio album Magna Carta Holy Grail. However, Jay-Z gave the song back to Drake, so he could use it on Nothing Was the Same.

"Paris Morton" is the name of a model who Drake wrote the first "Paris Morton Music" about, which was an extended verse from his Rick Ross collaboration "Aston Martin Music".

Leading up to the album's release, "Pound Cake" / "Paris Morton Music 2" was one of the most anticipated songs from Nothing Was the Same. It then leaked along with the rest of the album on September 15, 2013. Drake called the song a sequel, to his previous collaboration with Jay-Z "Light Up", which was featured on his debut album Thank Me Later. The song features them both rapping on the "Pound Cake" side of the song, with "Paris Morton Music 2" being a solo Drake track.

== Music and lyrics ==
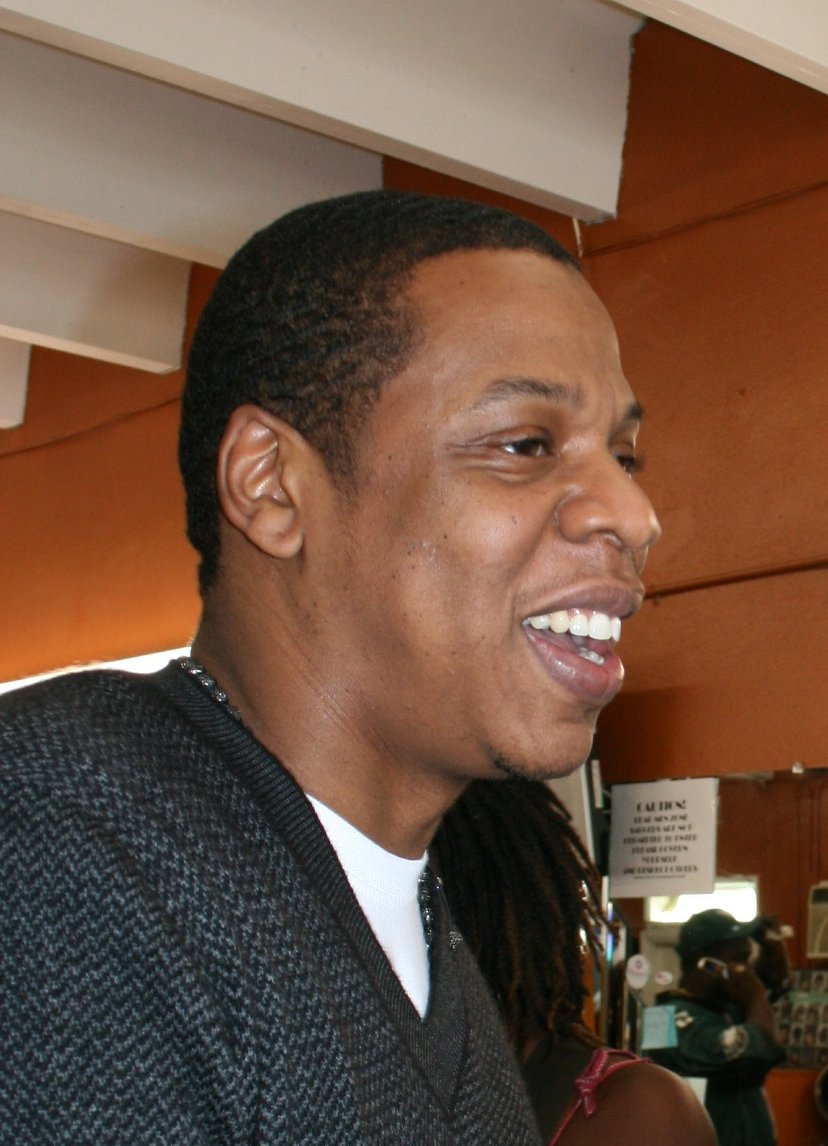
Jay-Z (pictured) is featured on “Pound Cake”.

Jay-Z's verse on "Pound Cake" has him referencing pop-culture and rapping in foreign languages. The "Paris Morton Music 2" section features Drake "proclaiming his once-in-a-generation greatness amid upscale-retail piano tinkling." The closing line of the song and album, is also the album's title; "the tone is neither rueful nor celebratory as much as simply matter-of-fact." Wu-Tang Clan's "C.R.E.A.M." is sampled on "Pound Cake", where the chorus is chopped throughout the song. The song also features Jimmy Smith in the intro, vocals from Timbaland on the chorus, and Ellie Goulding from her song "Don't Say a Word." The track features a "smooth and mellow instrumental that remains steady, before a complete beat switch up at the four-minute mark".

In "Pound Cake" Jay-Z says, "I've done made more millionaires than the lotto did/Dame made millions, Biggs made millions/Ye made millions, Just made millions/Lyor made millions, Cam made millions". Rapper Cam'ron took some offence to this saying, "He said he made more millionaires than the lotto did, but I knew Jay when he didn't have a million, when none of us had a million, when Dame and them were on the come-up." He would also go on to say, "he was proud of all of their successes but he thinks Jay-Z could have worded his verse differently as to not infer that he was given a hand out." Additionally Cam'ron responded to the lyric on his Ghetto Heaven, Vol. 1 mixtape track "Come and Talk To Me".

== Critical reception ==
"Pound Cake" / "Paris Morton Music 2" was met with generally positive reviews from music critics. MTV praised Drake's lyricism in the song saying, "Drake ends NWTS just as he started, with slick rhymes and a nimble flow." Justin Davis of Complex said, Drake "shows blinding confidence next to Jay-Z on "Pound Cake," lifting a little of Hov's aura to match him bar-for-bar." Jordan Sargent of Spin praised Boi-1da's production as "brilliant."

Despite the positive reviews, most critics dismissed Jay-Z's guest appearance as "lackluster." Bryant Kitching of Consequence of Sound put down Jay-Z's appearance saying, "It's the sequel to Thank Me Later's "Light Up", but the contrast between the two tracks couldn't be more stark. It's here, standing shoulder to shoulder with giants, where it's easiest to see how much Drake's craft has improved since he broke onto the scene. He doesn't need to lean on another MC; He's honed his game to the point where he can make even one of the most decorated rappers look like a second-rate schlub." Andrew Barker of Variety called Jay-Z's appearance on the song "half-assed", and said "it's hardly even surprising to see Drake run lyrical rings around him."

== Lawsuit ==
Drake was sued by the estate of Jimmy Smith over the sampling of "Jimmy Smith Rap" in the song. Although Cash Money Records had licensed the recording of the spoken-word piece, the estate argued that they had not licensed the composition (or lack thereof). The estate argued that they would not have licensed the song to Drake in the first place, given that Smith "wasn't a fan of hip hop". Of particular prominence in the case was a line from "Jimmy Smith Rap" that was modified to express an opinion different from that of the original recording; the line "Jazz is the only real music that's gonna last. All that other bullshit is here today and gone tomorrow. But jazz was, is and always will be", was abridged in "Pound Cake" to state that "Only real music's gonna last. All that other bullshit is here today and gone tomorrow."

U.S. District Court judge William H. Pauley III ruled in favour of Drake, arguing that his use of the passage qualified as fair use due to its transformative nature. Pauley argued that by "transform[ing] Jimmy Smith's brazen dismissal of all non-jazz music into a statement that 'real music,' with no qualifiers, is 'the only thing that's gonna last.", Drake had created "something new, with a further purpose or different character", with a "sharply different" purpose than the original work. The use of a total of 35 seconds of spoken-word material from "Jimmy Smith Rap" was considered reasonable, noting that the song's subsequent use of a second passage, in which Smith stated that his "company" had champagne in his studio, and that "we just laid back and [recorded the album]", was a commentary on an argument "that many musicians make records in similar ways (e.g. with the help of A&R experts or the stimulating effects of champagne), but that only 'real' music — regardless of the creative process or genre — will stand the test of time."

== Live performances ==
Jay-Z performed "Pound Cake" for the first time while on his Magna Carter World Tour in Manchester, England, UK.

== Remixes ==
The instrumental of "Pound Cake" was remixed by various other rappers shortly after its premiere. On September 25, 2013, The LOX released a remix to "Pound Cake" titled, "Hood Cake". Later that same day, Lupe Fiasco released a remix titled, "Pound of Flesh" / "Paris, Tokyo 2". At the end of the song he references various Chicago hip hop artists such as, Lil Durk, Lil Mouse, Chief Keef, Chance the Rapper, Common and Kanye West. That same day Ransom released a remix to the song. Two days later, Wu-Tang Clan member Raekwon released a remix to the first song titled, "Marble Cake". "Marble Cake" contains an intro that samples Ghostface Killah's verse from "Glaciers of Ice" and he changes Jay-Z's chant of "cake, cake" to "tecs, tecs." Along with Mysonne also releasing a remix that day. Then the following day, Houston's Killa Kyleon released a remix.

In October 2013, Trinidad James, Meek Mill and Spade-O, Memphis Bleek, Papoose, Skeme, Childish Gambino, Lil Dicky, and Chamillionaire released remixes or freestyles to "Pound Cake". On October 13, 2013, Complex named Fiasco's, Killa Kyleon's and The LOX's the best "Pound Cake" remixes. In November 2013, Legacy has released a remix to the song, and Craig David released a freestyle of the song on his radio show on Capital XTRA. On January 25, 2014, Tinie Tempah freestyled to the song for Charlie Sloth's Fire in the Booth on BBC Radio 1.

In 2022, Lil Baby released the lead single to his third studio album, "In a Minute" which has a slowed sample of "Pound Cake". The song peaked at #14 on the Billboard Hot 100 chart.

== Charts ==
Chart (2013)	Peak position
Canada Hot 100 (Billboard)	88
UK Singles (Official Charts)	111
UK Hip Hop/R&B (Official Charts)	26
US Billboard Hot 100	65
US Hot R&B/Hip-Hop Songs (Billboard)	24

== Certifications ==
Region	Certification	Certified units/sales
Australia (ARIA)	Platinum	70,000^{‡}
New Zealand (RMNZ)	Platinum	30,000^{‡}
United Kingdom (BPI)	Gold	400,000^{‡}
United States (RIAA)	Platinum	1,000,000^{‡}
^{‡} Sales+streaming figures based on certification alone.

== Release history ==
Country	Date	Format	Label
United Kingdom	September 26, 2013	Urban contemporary radio	Cash Money Records, Republic Records
