= I'm on My Way (traditional song) =

"I'm on my way (and I won't turn back)" is a traditional Gospel song. It is described a typical "going-to-Canaan" song; and possibly an Underground Railroad song.

The lyrics begin "I'm on my way and I won't turn back, I'm on my way and I won't turn back, I'm on my way and I won't turn back; I'm on my way, great God, I'm on my way. I asked my brother to come with me..."

== Recordings ==
- The Carter Family
- Odetta on Odetta Sings Ballads and Blues 1956
- Soundtrack for Elmer Gantry (1960)
- The Golden Gate Quartet recorded this song under the title "The Story of Job"
- Barbara Dane, on her album "On My Way", 1962.
- Adapted, into a new song "On My Way"
