= The Language =

Single by Drake

from the album Nothing Was the Same
- Released: October 29, 2013
- Recorded: 2013
- Genre: Hip-hop; trap
- Length: 3:44
- Label: Young Money; Cash Money; Republic
- Songwriters: Aubrey Graham; Anthony Palman; Matthew Samuels; Allen Ritter; Anderson Hernandez; Bryan Williams
- Producers: Boi-1da; Ritter; Vinylz

Drake singles chronology
"Pound Cake" (2013)	"The Language" (2013)	"Too Much" (2013)

"The Language" is a song by Canadian rapper Drake from his third studio album Nothing Was the Same (2013). "The Language" was produced by frequent collaborator Boi-1da, along with additional production by Allen Ritter and Vinylz. It also features an outro from Cash Money Records founder Birdman. The song was serviced to mainstream urban radio on October 29, 2013, as the fourth single from the album in the US and has peaked at number 51 on the Billboard Hot 100 chart.

== Background ==
In the early months of 2013, there were rumors of a disconnection between Drake and Cash Money Records, which only caught more fire due to him not appearing on the compilation album Rich Gang. On "The Language" Drake addresses these rumors saying, "Cash Money Records forever, I'm always Big-Tyming, bitch/ I came up right under Stunna." In August 2013, Big Sean released "Control" featuring Kendrick Lamar, where Lamar called out a group of rappers he has collaborated with including Drake, also saying he would "murder" them lyrically on a track. That same month, Drake spoke to Billboard, where he responded saying, "It just sounded like an ambitious thought to me. That's all it was. I know good and well that Kendrick's not murdering me, at all, in any platform." In a following interview he acted passively, putting down Lamar's verse as having no lasting significance.

"The Language" was produced by OVO Sound producer Boi-1da, and co-produced by Boi-1da's frequent collaborators Allen Ritter and Vinylz. In February 2013, the main producer of the song, Boi-1da contacted Ritter and Vinylz to come work on Nothing Was the Same with Drake and Boi-1da. While working with him they created, "No New Friends", "5AM in Toronto" and the instrumental for "The Language". Cash Money Records CEO Birdman also appears on the outro of the song in the same way he appeared on, "We'll Be Fine" from Take Care.

== Music and lyrics ==
Drake's flow on the song was described as being similar to Migos, known for their hit song "Versace", whose remix featured Drake. It was rumored that Drake subliminally dissed Lamar in "The Language" when he raps,

"Fuck any nigga that’s talkin’ that shit just to get a reaction / Fuck going platinum, I looked at my wrist and it’s already platinum / I am the kid with the motor mouth / I am the one you should worry about / I don't know who you're referring to, who is this nigga you heard about?"

Birdman appeared on MTV shortly after the album's release denying that the line was directed at Kendrick Lamar. Then shortly after, Lamar reportedly responded in the BET Hip Hop Awards TDE cypher where he says, ""And nothing's been the same since they dropped Control, and tucked a sensitive rapper back in his pajama clothes"." However, it was also rumored Lamar's verse was directed towards Papoose. In a December 2013 interview with Vibe, Drake spoke on the rumor saying:

"It’s a commitment to go there. 'The Language' is just energy. What it was inspired by, I’m sure that, and other things. It’s just me talking my shit. I never once felt the need to respond to that record. The sentiment he was putting forth is what he should have. Of course you wanna be the best. Where it became an issue is that I was rolling out an album while that verse was still bubbling, so my album rollout became about this thing. What am I supposed to say? 'Nah, we’ll be buddy-buddy?' Mind you, I never once said he’s a bad guy [or] I don’t like him. I think he’s a fucking genius in his own right, but I also stood my ground as I should."

== Critical reception ==
"The Language" was met with generally positive reviews from music critics. Nick Cutucci of Entertainment Weekly named the song, along with "Hold On, We're Going Home" as the album's best songs. of Billboard credited Drake with arrogantly reinstating his spot in the rap game with the song. William E. Ketchum of HipHopDX stated, that Drake "reuses the precise staccato flow from Drizzy’s verse on Migos' "Versace" to stunt on competition." David Drake of Complex described the song as, "unexpected bursts of blunt honesty that suggest, strangely, a rhetorical maturity, if not a personal one."

Andrew Unterberger of PopDust said, "The Language" might not as rich as some of Drake's more emo tracks, but it's necessary to keep the balance for Drake, who would surely become overbearing if all he ever sang about was Facebook stalking girls from high school. Plus, it's fun to hear Drake engage his more caddish self every once in a while–he does sleazy a lot better than he does angry anyway." In a more negative review Thomas Britt of PopMatters said, "“The Language” is a showcase for Drake's relentless flow, but he does himself no favors by failing to explore any interesting lyrical territory. He rhymes “platinum” with “platinum”. Such laziness might be acceptable were the song not about language."

== Remixes ==
American rapper Young Thug remixed the song and changed the title to "The Blanguage".

== Charts ==
=== Weekly charts ===
Chart (2013–2014)	Peak position
UK Singles (Official Charts)	143
UK Hip Hop/R&B (Official Charts)	40
US Billboard Hot 100	51
US Hot R&B/Hip-Hop Songs (Billboard)	13
US Rhythmic Airplay (Billboard)	12

=== Year-end charts ===
Chart (2014)	Position
US Hot R&B/Hip-Hop Songs (Billboard)	61

== Certifications ==
Region	Certification	Certified units/sales
United Kingdom (BPI)	Silver	200,000^{‡}
United States (RIAA)	Platinum	1,000,000^{‡}
^{‡} Sales+streaming figures based on certification alone.

== Release history ==
Country	Date	Format	Label
United States	October 29, 2013	Mainstream urban radio	Young Money; Cash Money Records; Republic Records
United States	November 5, 2013	Rhythmic contemporary radio	Young Money; Cash Money Records; Republic Records
