= All Me (Drake song) =

Drake song

Single by Drake featuring 2 Chainz and Big Sean

from the album Nothing Was the Same
- Released: September 24, 2013
- Recorded: 2013
- Genre: Hip hop; trap
- Length: 4:31
- Label: Young Money; Cash Money; Republic
- Songwriters: Aubrey Graham; Anthony Palman; Sean Anderson; Tauheed Epps; Dwane Weir; Albert Lucien Willemetz; Jacques Charles; Maurice Yvain
- Producers: Key Wane; Noah "40" Shebib

Drake singles chronology
"Live For" (2013)	"All Me" (2013)	"Pound Cake" (2013)

Big Sean singles chronology
"Sorry" (2013)	"All Me" (2013)	"I Don't Fuck with You" (2014)

2 Chainz singles chronology
"Used 2" (2013)	"All Me" (2013)	"Cut Her Off" (2013)

"All Me" is a song by Canadian rapper Drake featuring American rappers 2 Chainz and Big Sean from the former's third studio album Nothing Was the Same (2013). The song was serviced to urban contemporary radio as the album's third official single on September 24, 2013. Produced by Finally Famous' Key Wane and Noah "40" Shebib, the song peaked at number 20 on the US Billboard Hot 100 chart.

== Background ==
On August 1, 2013, Drake released "All Me" featuring Big Sean and 2 Chainz, with production from Key Wane. The song also featured an intro by comedian Aziz Ansari. Key Wane gave Drake and Noah "40" Shebib credit for adding the Ansari sample and the ending breakdown. However, the intro and ending of the song are not included on the album. The Ansari intro features a sample of one of Ansari's alter egos, "Randy", from the movie Funny People.

Key Wane originally played the instrumental backing track used for "All Me" through his iPad at a photoshoot for Sean's clothing line. Sean took interest in the beat and decided to use it for his upcoming album Hall of Fame. However, the song would go unfinished for several months. After a period without progress on the track, Wane tweaked it and sent the song to Drake, who was coincidentally in the studio with 2 Chainz. Drake and 2 Chainz immediately became interested in the song and recorded verses over the instrumental. While spending time at Drake's Los Angeles home, Sean discovered that they both had recorded verses over the track. Key Wane then pressured Sean to send Drake his verse so he could use the song on his album, Nothing Was the Same.

== Release and promotion ==
On August 1, 2013, Drake released "All Me" for free download via his SoundCloud account. However, as Nothing Was the Same's September 24 release was approaching, it was removed from SoundCloud. The song was originally reported to be Nothing Was the Same's second single, before "Hold On, We're Going Home" 's release.

The song would be released to DJs as a promotional single that same month. Then on September 24, 2013, Drake serviced "All Me" to urban contemporary radio in the United States as Nothing Was the Same's third official single.

== Critical reception ==
"All Me" was met with rave reviews upon its release, including praise from Spin, Fuse and Vice, among others. Acclaim was mainly directed at the verses, and the production. DJBooth.net, Paste and The Fader called the song a summer anthem. Although he praised Nothing Was the Same overall, Jesal 'Jay Soul' Padania of Rapreviews.com said that the deluxe edition tracks, including "All Me", were stronger than most of other tracks appearing on the standard version of the album.

Jon Blistein of Rolling Stone praised the song, stating that "Drake emphasizes his self-made come up and bank account size over a gorgeous bed of subdued synths; when it drops after the hook, it's into hollow bell rings, a warped monastic vocal sample and a characteristically ridiculous 2 Chainz verse." Complex praised Big Sean's appearance as the thirteenth best verse of 2013.

== Live performances ==
In August 2013, Drake performed "All Me" at Kylie Jenner's Sweet 16, in a medley of other songs including "Started From the Bottom", "HYFR", and "No New Friends". Drake performed the song as a part of his regular set list, throughout the Would You like a Tour? concert tour. On December 16, 2013, during the tour's stop in Detroit, Big Sean made a surprise appearance and performed the song with Drake.

== Chart performance ==
=== Weekly charts ===
Chart (2013)	Peak position
Canada Hot 100 (Billboard)	72
France (SNEP)	141
UK Singles (Official Charts)	112
UK Hip Hop/R&B (Official Charts)	33
US Billboard Hot 100	20
US Hot R&B/Hip-Hop Songs (Billboard)	6
US Rhythmic Songs (Billboard)	15

=== Year-end charts ===
Chart (2013)	Position
US Hot R&B/Hip-Hop Songs (Billboard)	71
US Rap Songs (Billboard)	47
Chart (2014)	Position
US Hot R&B/Hip-Hop Songs (Billboard)	39

== Certifications ==
Region	Certification	Certified units/sales
Australia (ARIA)	Gold	35,000^{‡}
New Zealand (RMNZ)	Gold	15,000^{‡}
United Kingdom (BPI)	Silver	200,000^{‡}
United States (RIAA)	2× Platinum	2,000,000^{‡}
^{‡} Sales+streaming figures based on certification alone.

== Release history ==
Country	Date	Format	Label
United States	September 24, 2013	Urban contemporary radio	Young Money, Cash Money, Republic
United States	December 2013	Rhythmic contemporary radio	Young Money, Cash Money, Republic
