= Worst Behavior =

Single by Drake

from the album Nothing Was the Same
- Released: June 9, 2014
- Recorded: 2013
- Genre: Hip hop; trap; glitch hop
- Length: 4:30
- Label: Aspire; Young Money; Cash Money; Republic
- Songwriters: Aubrey Graham; Anthony Palman; Dacoury Natche; Noel Fisher
- Producer: DJ Dahi

Drake singles chronology
"Believe Me" (2014)	"Worst Behavior" (2014)	"0 to 100 / The Catch Up" (2014)

Music video
- "Worst Behavior" on YouTube

"Worst Behavior" is a song by Canadian recording artist Drake from his third studio album Nothing Was the Same (2013). "Worst Behavior" was produced by DJ Dahi, and was written by Drake, Anthony Palman, DJ Dahi, and Detail. The song peaked at number 89 on the Billboard Hot 100 chart. On June 9, 2014, the song was serviced to urban contemporary radio in the United Kingdom as the album's seventh single.

== Background ==
"Worst Behavior" was produced by Los Angeles–based producer DJ Dahi, best known at the time for producing Schoolboy Q's "Sexting" and Kendrick Lamar "Money Trees". DJ Dahi spoke to MTV about the collaboration saying his manager sent the beat to Drake in mid-August 2013 before Drake announced the album's pushed back release date. Drake then chose to use the instrumental, and met with Dahi later to discuss the record. Additionally Dahi said, "It's dope because it's different from what Drake has ever done to me I think, sonically. His pocket is different; his rap flow is kind of crazy on that one."

In the song Drake reflects back on his childhood grind, and tells off his detractors who did not believe he would ever make it. The song features a "screwed-and-chopped-sounding, hook-less beat," while raps an extended quote of Ma$e's verse from The Notorious B.I.G.'s "Mo Money, Mo Problems". Vibe called the song trap-influenced and included Hudson Mohawke, among other upcoming producers in a wish list of producers that should remix the song.

== Release and promotion ==
"Worst Behavior" was added to the playlist of United Kingdom urban contemporary radio station BBC Radio 1Xtra on June 9, 2014. It subsequently impacted UK contemporary hit radio on July 7, 2014, as the album's seventh single.

== Critical reception ==
The song was met with general acclaim from music critics. Julia Leconte of NOW declared the song an album standout. Jon Caramanica of The New York Times called the song Nothing Was the Same's most chaotic and rowdy moment, "which seethes with spite." Mike Diver of Clash said the song was the first song of the album "that really bumps, rather than grinding politely against the senses in the style that past Drake tracks like 'Club Paradise' achieved. Drake sounds charged up, properly prickly, as he spits about how a certain "motherf*cker never loved us"."

Adam Thomas of Sputnikmusic called "Worst Behavior" a club friendly trap glitch-out. Jayson Greene of Pitchfork praised the production, saying it featured "glowering low-end synth and an insectile battery of defaced-sounding percussion." Greene also called it the "meanest thing Drake has ever rapped over." William Ketchum of HipHopDX also credited the song as using "anthem choruses and punchline-laden verses to revel in victories despite humble beginnings", along with praising the song's production. Nathan Slavik of DJBooth spoke on the song, saying "once an album, Drake likes to serve up a true banger, a track designed to be played at 11. On Take Care, it was 'Lord Knows' and on Nothing Was the Same it's 'Worst Behavior', a cut with a hypnotic beat but vocally doesn't amount to much more than Drake quoting Mase and saying 'motherfucker' as many times as possible; swearing seems to be the extent of his bad behavior. I get why Drizzy makes tracks like this, he clearly cares enough about his reputation as an emcee to defend it, but it's also when he's at his least convincing."

Andrew Unterberger of PopCrush gave it a less positive review, saying "Worst Behavior" is definitely a low end for Nothing Was the Same, and like "Own It", it might have been a lot more effective coming later in the album, but coming where it does, it just sounds kinda brutal and unnecessary." Jay Soul of RapReviews called the song, "interesting but arguably misplaced."

Pitchfork named "Worst Behavior" the 18th best song of 2013. They elaborated saying,

"Drake's worst has him flexing, ogling the zeroes on his checks, and defeating a handicapped Serena Williams on the tennis court. But 'Worst Behavior' isn't so much about the what as much as the why—it's powered by a blinding sense of indignation that's spring-loaded for maximum comeuppance upon any and all who have ever doubted this middle-class Canadian child star. The song begins with what sounds like a flying saucer landing, as if the rapper rented a UFO from Area 51 and flew it to a poor old hater's backyard just so he could tell them to fuck off. Drake's Tourette's flow matches the beat's halting clatter, each incensed shout—remember?! ... muhfucka?!—hitting like a bomb in the dark."

Kyle Kramer of Complex named it the third best song of 2013.

== Music video ==
The music video for "Worst Behavior" was filmed in mid-October 2013, in Memphis, Tennessee, by Director X. Turk of the Hot Boys, Drake's father, Juicy J, and Project Pat, along with MJG from 8Ball & MJG, made cameo appearances in the video. On November 9, 2013, Drake previewed the music video during his stop in New Orleans during Would You Like A Tour?. The ten-minute-long music video was released on November 11, 2013.

== Derivative works ==
Eric Dingus, an 18-year-old Austin, Texas–based electronic producer, released a remix of the song to his SoundCloud page. The remix was shared on Drake's October's Very Own blog on November 17, 2013.

Indian-Canadian YouTube celebrity Jus Reign created a cover video which was shot in Punjab, India, and uploaded to YouTube in April 2014.

== Awards and nominations ==
Year	Ceremony	Award	Result
2014	BET Awards 2014	Coca-Cola Viewers' Choice Award	Nominated
2014	BET Awards 2014	Video of the Year	Nominated
2014	2014 BET Hip Hop Awards	Best Hip Hop Video	Won
2014	2014 BET Hip Hop Awards	People's Champ Award	Won
2014	2014 BET Hip Hop Awards	Track of the Year	Nominated

== Charts ==
=== Weekly charts ===
Chart (2013–2014)	Peak position
US Billboard Hot 100	89
US Hot R&B/Hip-Hop Songs (Billboard)	29

=== Year-end charts ===
Chart (2014)	Position
US Hot R&B/Hip-Hop Songs (Billboard)	92

== Certifications ==
Certifications for "Worst Behavior"
Region	Certification	Certified units/sales
Australia (ARIA)	Gold	35,000^{‡}
United Kingdom (BPI)	Silver	200,000^{‡}
United States (RIAA)	Platinum	1,000,000^{‡}
^{‡} Sales+streaming figures based on certification alone.
