= List of awards and nominations received by Drake =

Drake awards and nominations
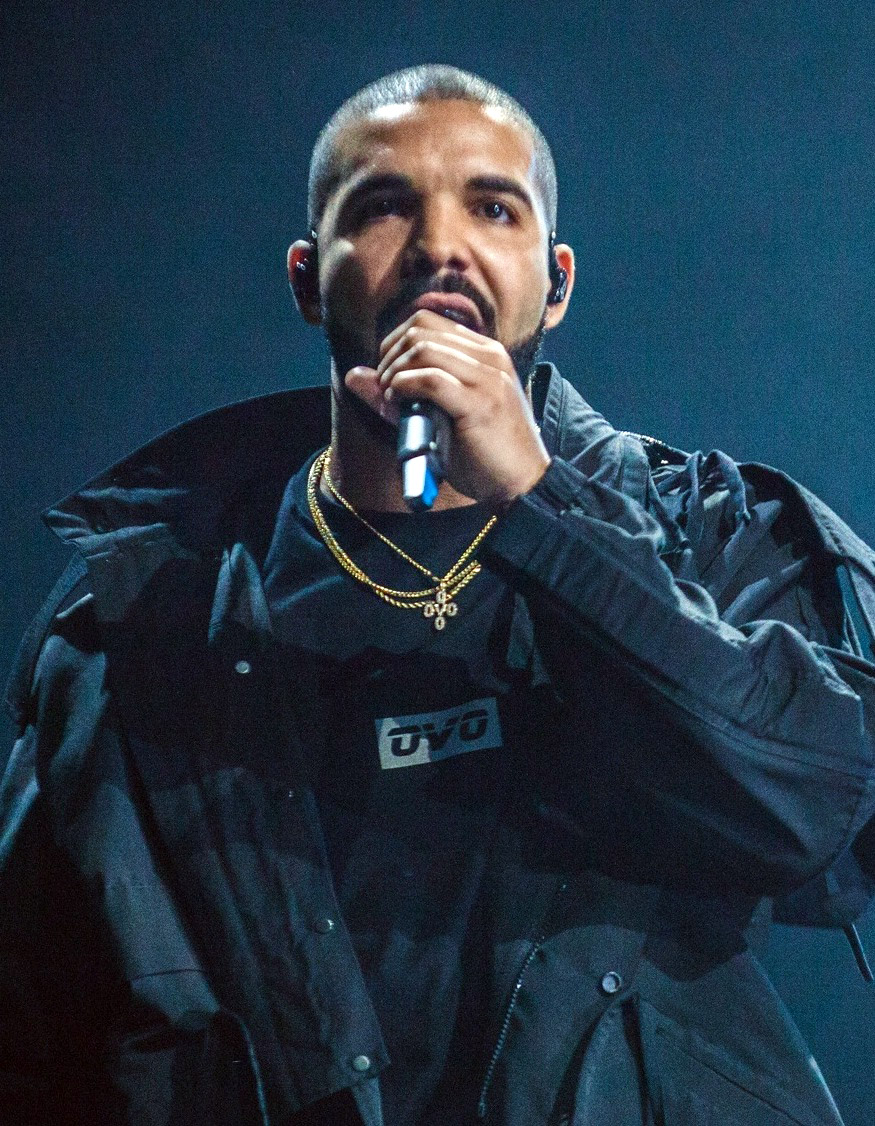
- Drake performing in July 2016
Awards and nominations
Award	Wins	Nominations

Totals (Note: Certain award groups do not simply award one winner. They acknowledge several different recipients, have runners-up, and have third place. Since this is a specific recognition and is different from losing an award, runner-up mentions are considered wins in this award tally. For simplification and to avoid errors, each award in this list has been presumed to have had a prior nomination.)
- Wins: 281
- Nominations: 613

Drake is a Canadian rapper. He began an acting career in 2001 under his legal name Aubrey Drake Graham. During his acting career, he won five Young Artist Award nominations for portraying Jimmy Brooks in the CTV teen drama Degrassi: The Next Generation, alongside an Best Ensemble in a TV Series (Comedy or Drama) win at the 2002 Young Artist Awards. He began a music career in 2006, for which he has won subsequent honours.

Overall, Drake has won 281 awards, including 5 Grammy Awards from 51 nominations. He has won a record 41 awards from 102 nominations at the Billboard Music Awards, including Artist of the Decade.

== American Music Awards ==
Created by Dick Clark in 1973, the American Music Awards is an annual music awards ceremony and one of several major annual American music awards shows. Drake has won seven awards from forty-nine nominations.

Year	Nominee / work	Award	Result
2010	Drake	Favorite Rap/Hip-Hop Artist	Nominated
2010	Thank Me Later	Favorite Rap/Hip-Hop Album	Nominated
2012	Take Care	Favorite Rap/Hip-Hop Album	Nominated
2012	Drake	Artist of the Year	Nominated
2012	Drake	Favorite Rap/Hip-Hop Artist	Nominated
2014	Drake	Favorite Rap/Hip-Hop Artist	Nominated
2014	Nothing Was the Same	Favorite Rap/Hip-Hop Album	Nominated
2015	If You're Reading This It's Too Late	Favorite Rap/Hip-Hop Album	Nominated
2015	Drake	Favorite Rap/Hip-Hop Artist	Nominated
2016	Drake	Favorite Rap/Hip-Hop Artist	Won
2016	Drake	Favorite Pop/Rock Male Artist	Nominated
2016	Views	Favorite Pop/Rock Album	Nominated
2016	Views	Favorite Rap/Hip-Hop Album	Won
2016	What a Time to Be Alive (with Future)	Favorite Rap/Hip-Hop Album	Nominated
2016	"One Dance" (featuring Wizkid and Kyla)	Favorite Pop/Rock Song	Nominated
2016	"One Dance" (featuring Wizkid and Kyla)	Favorite Soul/R&B Song	Nominated
2016	"One Dance" (featuring Wizkid and Kyla)	Collaboration of the Year	Nominated
2016	"Work" (with Rihanna)	Collaboration of the Year	Nominated
2016	"Work" (with Rihanna)	Favorite Soul/R&B Song	Won
2016	"Work" (with Rihanna)	Video of the Year	Nominated
2016	"Hotline Bling"	Favorite Rap/Hip-Hop Song	Won
2017	Drake	Artist of the Year	Nominated
2017	Drake	Favorite Pop/Rock Male Artist	Nominated
2017	Drake	Favorite Rap/Hip-Hop Artist	Won
2017	More Life	Favorite Pop/Rock Album	Nominated
2017	More Life	Favorite Rap/Hip-Hop Album	Nominated
2018	Drake	Artist of the Year	Nominated
2018	Drake	Favorite Pop/Rock Male Artist	Nominated
2018	Drake	Favorite Rap/Hip-Hop Artist	Nominated
2018	Scorpion	Favorite Pop/Rock Album	Nominated
2018	Scorpion	Favorite Rap/Hip-Hop Album	Nominated
2018	"God's Plan"	Video of the Year	Nominated
2018	"God's Plan"	Favorite Pop/Rock Song	Nominated
2018	"God's Plan"	Favorite Rap/Hip-Hop Song	Nominated
2019	Drake	Artist of the Year	Nominated
2019	Drake	Favorite Pop/Rock Male Artist	Nominated
2019	Drake	Favorite Rap/Hip-Hop Artist	Nominated
2020	"Life Is Good" (featuring Future)	Favorite Music Video	Nominated
2020	"No Guidance" (featuring Chris Brown)	Favorite Song – Soul/R&B	Nominated
2021	Drake	Artist of the Year	Nominated
2021	Drake	Favorite Male Pop Artist	Nominated
2021	Drake	Favorite Rap/Hip-Hop Male Artist	Won
2021	Certified Lover Boy	Favorite Album – Hip-Hop	Nominated
2022	Drake	Artist of the Year	Nominated
2022	Drake	Favorite Male Pop Artist	Nominated
2022	Drake	Favorite Rap/Hip-Hop Male Artist	Nominated
2022	"Wait for U" (with Future and Tems)	Collaboration of the Year	Nominated
2022	"Wait for U" (with Future and Tems)	Favorite Hip-Hop Song	Won
2022	Honestly, Nevermind	Favorite R&B Album	Nominated
2025	Drake	Favorite Rap/Hip-Hop Male Artist	Nominated
2025	Some Sexy Songs 4 U	Favorite R&B Album	Nominated

== ARIA Music Awards ==
The Australian Recording Industry Association Music Awards are awarded annually by the Australian Recording Industry Association (ARIA).

Year	Nominee / work	Award	Result	Ref.
2016	Himself	Best International Artist	Nominated	
2018	Himself	Best International Artist	Nominated	
2022	Himself	Best International Artist	Nominated	
2023	Himself and 21 Savage	Best International Artist	Nominated	
2024	Himself	Best International Artist	Nominated	

== All Africa Music Awards ==
The All Africa Music Awards is an award presented by International Committee of AFRIMA and African Union.

Year	Nominee / work	Award	Result	Ref.
2021	Himself	Best Global Act	Nominated	
2022	Himself	Best Global Act	Nominated	

== BAFTA TV Awards ==
The BAFTA TV Awards, or British Academy Television Awards, are presented in an annual award show hosted by the British Academy of Film and Television Arts (BAFTA). Drake has received one nomination as the executive producer of the television series Euphoria.

Year	Nominee / work	Award	Result	Ref.
2020	Euphoria (with Sam Levinson, Ravi Nandan and Kevin Turen)	Best International Programme	Nominated	

== BBC Music Awards ==
The BBC Music Awards are the BBC's inaugural pop music awards, first held in December 2014, as a celebration of the musical achievements over the past 12 months.

Year	Nominee / work	Award	Result	Ref.
2016	"One Dance" (with Wizkid and Kyla)	BBC Song of the Year	Nominated	

== Berlin Music Video Awards ==
The Berlin Music Video Awards is an international festival that promotes the art of music videos.

Year	Nominee/ work	Award	Result	Ref.
2025	"First Person Shooter" ft. J. Cole	Best VFX	Nominated	

== BET Awards ==
The BET Awards were established in 2001 by the Black Entertainment Television (BET) network to celebrate African Americans and other minorities in music, acting, sports and other fields of entertainment. The awards are presented annually and broadcast live on BET. Drake has won seventeen awards from eighty-five nominations.

Year	Nominee / work	Award	Result
2010
2010	Himself	Best Male Hip-Hop Artist	Won
2010	"Successful" (with Trey Songz)	Best Collaboration	Nominated
2010	"Forever" (with Kanye West, Lil Wayne and Eminem)	Best Collaboration	Nominated
2010	"BedRock" (with Young Money and Lloyd)	Viewer's Choice	Nominated
2010	Young Money	Best Group	Won
2010	Young Money	Best New Artist	Nominated
2011	Himself	Best Male Hip Hop Artist	Nominated
2011	"What's My Name?" (with Rihanna)	Best Collaboration	Nominated
2011	"What's My Name?" (with Rihanna)	Coca-Cola Viewer's Choice	Nominated
2011	"Moment 4 Life" (with Nicki Minaj)	Coca-Cola Viewer's Choice	Nominated
2012
2012	"I'm on One" (with DJ Khaled, Rick Ross and Lil Wayne)	Best Collaboration	Nominated
2012	"The Motto" (with Lil Wayne and Tyga)	Best Collaboration	Nominated
2012	"The Motto" (with Lil Wayne and Tyga)	Coca-Cola Viewer's Choice	Nominated
2012	Himself	FANdemonium Award	Nominated
2012	Himself	Best Male Hip-Hop Artist	Won
2013	"No Lie" (with 2 Chainz)	Best Collaboration	Nominated
2013	"No Lie" (with 2 Chainz)	Video of the Year	Nominated
2013	"Problems" (with ASAP Rocky, 2 Chainz and Kendrick Lamar)	Video of the Year	Nominated
2013	"Problems" (with ASAP Rocky, 2 Chainz and Kendrick Lamar)	Best Collaboration	Won
2013	"Problems" (with ASAP Rocky, 2 Chainz and Kendrick Lamar)	Coca-Cola Viewer's Choice	Nominated
2013	"Poetic Justice" (with Kendrick Lamar)	Best Collaboration	Nominated
2013	"Poetic Justice" (with Kendrick Lamar)	Video of the Year	Nominated
2013	"Started from the Bottom"	Video of the Year	Won
2013	"Started from the Bottom"	Coca-Cola Viewer's Choice	Won
2013	"Pop That" (with French Montana, Rick Ross and Lil Wayne)	Best Collaboration	Nominated
2013	"HYFR" (with Lil Wayne)	Video of the Year	Nominated
2013	Himself	Best Male Hip-Hop Artist	Nominated
2014	"Hold On, We're Going Home" (with Majid Jordan)	Best Collaboration	Nominated
2014	"Worst Behavior"	Video of the Year	Nominated
2014	"Worst Behavior"	Coca-Cola Viewer's Choice	Nominated
2014	Young Money	Best Group	Won
2014	Himself	Best Male Hip Hop Artist	Won
2015	"Only" (with Nicki Minaj, Chris Brown and Lil Wayne)	Coca-Cola Viewer's Choice	Won
2015	Young Money	Best Group	Nominated
2015	Himself	Best Male Hip Hop Artist	Nominated
2015	Himself	FANdemoniam Award	Nominated
2016	"Where Ya At" (with Future)	Best Collaboration	Nominated
2016	"Where Ya At" (with Future)	Coca-Cola Viewer's Choice	Nominated
2016	"Work" (with Rihanna)	Coca-Cola Viewer's Choice	Nominated
2016	"Work" (with Rihanna)	Best Collaboration	Won
2016	"Work" (with Rihanna)	Video of the Year	Nominated
2016	"Hotline Bling"	Video of the Year	Nominated
2016	"Hotline Bling"	Coca-Cola Viewer's Choice	Nominated
2016	Himself and Future	Best Group	Won
2016	Himself	Best Male Hip Hop Artist	Won
2017	Himself	Best Male Hip Hop Artist	Nominated
2017	"Fake Love"	Viewers’ Choice Award	Nominated
2018	Himself	Best Male Hip Hop Artist	Nominated
2018	"God's Plan"	Viewers’ Choice Award	Nominated
2018	"God's Plan"	Video of the Year	Won
2018	"Walk It Talk It" (with Migos)	Video of the Year	Nominated
2019	Himself	Best Male Hip Hop Artist	Nominated
2019	"Sicko Mode"	Viewers’ Choice Award	Nominated
2019	"Sicko Mode"	Best Collaboration	Won
2019	"In My Feelings"	Viewers’ Choice Award	Nominated
2019	"Nice For What"	Video of the Year	Nominated
2020	Himself	Best Male Hip Hop Artist	Nominated
2020	"No Guidance" (featuring Chris Brown)	Video of the Year	Nominated
2020	"No Guidance" (featuring Chris Brown)	Best Collaboration	Won
2020	"No Guidance" (featuring Chris Brown)	Coca-Cola Viewers' Choice Award	Nominated
2020	"Life Is Good" (featuring Future)	Coca-Cola Viewers' Choice Award	Nominated
2020	"Life Is Good" (featuring Future)	Best Collaboration	Nominated
2021	"Popstar" (featuring DJ Khaled) (Starring Justin Bieber)	Best Collaboration	Nominated
2021	"Popstar" (featuring DJ Khaled) (Starring Justin Bieber)	Coca-Cola Viewers' Choice Award	Nominated
2021	"Laugh Now Cry Later"	Coca-Cola Viewers' Choice Award	Nominated
2021	"Laugh Now Cry Later"	Video of the Year	Nominated
2021	Himself	Best Male Hip Hop Artist	Nominated
2022	Himself	Best Male Hip Hop Artist	Nominated
2022	Certified Lover Boy	Album of the Year	Nominated
2022	Way 2 Sexy" (featuring Future and Young Thug)	Video of the Year	Nominated
2022	Way 2 Sexy" (featuring Future and Young Thug)	Best Collaboration	Nominated
2023	Himself	Best Male Hip Hop Artist	Nominated
2023	Himself	Best Male R&B/Pop Artist	Nominated
2023	Her Loss (with 21 Savage)	Album of the Year	Nominated
2023	"Jimmy Cooks" (featuring 21 Savage)	Viewer's Choice Award	Nominated
2023	"Wait for U" (with Future and Tems)	Viewer's Choice Award	Nominated
2023	"Wait for U" (with Future and Tems)	Best Collaboration	Won
2023	Himself and 21 Savage	Best Group	Won
2024	Himself	Best Male Hip Hop Artist	Nominated
2024	Himself	Best Male R&B/Pop Artist	Nominated
2024	For All the Dogs Scary Hours Edition	Album of the Year	Nominated
2024	"First Person Shooter"(featuring J. Cole)	Video of the Year	Nominated
2024	"Rich Baby Daddy"(featuring Sexyy Red & SZA)	Video of the Year	Nominated
2024	"Rich Baby Daddy"(featuring Sexyy Red & SZA)	Viewer's Choice Award	Nominated
2024	"Rich Baby Daddy"(featuring Sexyy Red & SZA)	Best Collaboration	Nominated
2025	Himself	Best Male R&B/Pop Artist	Nominated
2025	Himself	Best Male Hip Hop Artist	Nominated
2025	"Nokia"	Viewer's Choice Award	Nominated
2025	"Family Matters"	Video of the Year	Nominated
2025	Some Sexy Songs 4 U (with PartyNextDoor)	Album of the Year	Nominated

== BET Hip Hop Awards ==
The BET Hip Hop Awards are hosted annually by BET for hip hop performers, producers and music video directors. Drake has won twenty-four awards.

Year	Nominee / work	Award	Result
2009	Himself	Lyricist of the Year	Nominated
2009	Himself	Rookie of the Year	Won
2009	Himself	MVP of the Year	Nominated
2009	Himself	Hustler of the Year	Nominated
2010	"Over"	People's Champ Award	Nominated
2010	"Forever" (with Kanye West, Lil Wayne and Eminem)	Perfect Combo Award	Nominated
2010	"Find Your Love"	Best Hip Hop Video	Nominated
2010	Thank Me Later	CD Of The Year	Nominated
2010	Himself	Best Live Performer	Nominated
2010	Himself	Hustler Of The Year	Nominated
2010	Himself	Lyricist Of The Year	Nominated
2010	Himself	MVP Of The Year	Won
2011	"I'm on One" (with DJ Khaled, Rick Ross and Lil Wayne)	Best Collaboration	Nominated
2011	"I'm on One" (with DJ Khaled, Rick Ross and Lil Wayne)	Best Hip-Hop Video	Nominated
2011	"I'm on One" (with DJ Khaled, Rick Ross and Lil Wayne)	Best Club Banger	Nominated
2012
2012	HYFR (with Lil Wayne)	Best Hip-Hop Video	Won
2012	"The Motto" (with Lil Wayne and Tyga)	Reese's Perfect Combo Award	Nominated
2012	"The Motto" (with Lil Wayne and Tyga)	Best Club Banger	Nominated
2012	"Stay Schemin'"	Sweetest Sixteen (Best Featured Verse)	Nominated
2012	"No Lie" (with 2 Chainz)	People's Champ Award	Won
2012	"No Lie" (with 2 Chainz)	Best Hip-Hop Video	Nominated
2012	"No Lie" (with 2 Chainz)	Reese's Perfect Combo Award	Nominated
2012	Take Care	CD Of The Year	Nominated
2012	Himself	Best Live Performer	Nominated
2013	"Started From the Bottom"	People's Champ Award	Won
2013	"Started From the Bottom"	Best Hip Hop Video	Won
2013	"Fuckin' Problems" (with ASAP Rocky, 2 Chainz and Kendrick Lamar)	Best Hip Hop Video	Nominated
2013	"Fuckin' Problems" (with ASAP Rocky, 2 Chainz and Kendrick Lamar)	Best Collabo, Duo or Group	Won
2013	"Pop That" (with French Montana, Rick Ross and Lil Wayne)	Best Collabo, Duo or Group	Nominated
2013	"Pop That" (with French Montana, Rick Ross and Lil Wayne)	Best Club Banger	Won
2013	"Started From the Bottom"	Best Club Banger	Nominated
2013	"Fuckin' Problems" (with ASAP Rocky, 2 Chainz and Kendrick Lamar)	Best Club Banger	Nominated
2013	"Fuckin' Problems" (with ASAP Rocky, 2 Chainz and Kendrick Lamar)	People's Champ Award	Nominated
2013	"Versace (Remix)"	Sweet 16 (Best Featured Verse)	Nominated
2013	"Poetic Justice" (with Kendrick Lamar)	Best Collabo, Duo or Group	Nominated
2013	Himself	Lyricist of the Year	Nominated
2013	Himself	MVP of the Year	Nominated
2014	"Worst Behavior"	Best Hip Hop Video	Won
2014	"Worst Behavior"	People's Champ Award	Won
2014	"Who Do You Love?"	Sweet 16 (Best Featured Verse)	Nominated
2014	Nothing Was the Same	Album of the Year	Won
2014	Himself	Best Live Performer	Nominated
2014	Himself	Lyricist of the Year	Nominated
2014	Himself	MVP of the Year	Nominated
2014	Himself	Hustler of the Year	Nominated
2015	"Blessings" (with Big Sean and Kanye West)	Peoples Champ Award	Won
2015	"Blessings" (with Big Sean and Kanye West)	Best Collab, Duo, or Group	Won
2015	"Blessings" (with Big Sean and Kanye West)	Best Hip-Hop Video	Nominated
2015	"Blessings" (with Big Sean and Kanye West)	Sweet 16 Award	Nominated
2015	"My Way (Remix)"	Sweet 16 Award	Won
2015	"Truffle Butter" (with Nicki Minaj and Lil Wayne)	Best Collab, Duo, or Group	Nominated
2015	Himself	Hustler of the Year	Won
2015	Himself	Best Lyricist of the Year	Nominated
2015	Himself	Best Live Performer	Nominated
2015	Himself	MVP of the Year	Won
2015	Himself	Best Hip-Hop Style	Nominated
2015	If You're Reading This It's Too Late	Album of the Year	Nominated
2016	"For Free" (with DJ Khaled)	Peoples Champ Award	Nominated
2016	"For Free" (with DJ Khaled)	Best Collab, Duo, or Group	Nominated
2016	"One Dance" (with Wizkid and Kyla)	Best Collab, Duo, or Group	Nominated
2016	"Jumpman" (with Future)	Best Collab, Duo, or Group	Nominated
2016	"Hotline Bling"	Best Hip-Hop Video	Won
2016	"Work"	Sweet 16 Award	Nominated
2016	Himself	Hustler of the Year	Nominated
2016	Himself	Best Lyricist of the Year	Nominated
2016	Himself	Best Live Performer	Nominated
2016	Himself	MVP of the Year	Nominated
2016	Himself	Best Hip-Hop Style	Nominated
2016	Views	Album of the Year	Won
2017	Himself	Hot Ticket Performer	Nominated
2017	Himself	Lyricist of the Year	Nominated
2018	Himself	Hot Ticket Performer	Won
2018	Himself	Lyricist of the Year	Nominated
2018	Himself	MVP of the Year	Nominated
2018	Himself	Hustler of the Year	Nominated
2018	"Nice for What"	Single of the Year	Nominated
2018	"God's Plan"	Single of the Year	Nominated
2018	"God's Plan"	Best Hip Hop Video	Nominated
2018	"Walk It Talk It" (with Migos)	Best Hip Hop Video	Nominated
2018	"Look Alive" (with BlocBoy JB)	Best Collabo, Duo or Group	Nominated
2018	"Look Alive" (with BlocBoy JB)	Sweet 16: Best Featured Verse	Nominated
2018	Scorpion	Album of the Year	Nominated
2020	Himself	Hip Hop Artist of the Year	Nominated
2020	Himself	Best Live Performer	Nominated
2020	Himself	Lyricist of the Year	Nominated
2020	"Life Is Good" (with Future)	Best Hip Hop Video	Won
2020	"Life Is Good" (with Future)	Best Collaboration	Nominated
2020	"Toosie Slide"	Best Hip Hop Video	Nominated
2021	Himself	Hip Hop Artist of the Year	Nominated
2021	Himself	Lyricist of the Year	Nominated
2021	Himself	Hustler of the Year	Nominated
2021	"Laugh Now Cry Later" (with Lil Durk)	Best Hip Hop Video	Nominated
2021	"Laugh Now Cry Later" (with Lil Durk)	Best Collaboration	Nominated
2021	"Mr. Right Now" (with 21 Savage and Metro Boomin)	Best Collaboration	Nominated
2021	Future & Drake	Best Duo/Group	Nominated
2021	"Having Our Way"	Sweet 16: Best Featured Verse	Nominated
2022	Himself	Hip Hop Artist of the Year	Nominated
2022	Himself	Best Live Performer	Nominated
2022	Himself	Lyricist of the Year	Nominated
2022	Himself	Hustler of the Year	Nominated
2022	Certified Lover Boy	Album of the Year	Nominated
2022	"Wait for U" (with Future and Tems)	Best Hip Hop Video	Nominated
2022	"Wait for U" (with Future and Tems)	Song of the Year	Nominated
2022	"Wait for U" (with Future and Tems)	Sweet 16: Best Featured Verse	Nominated
2022	"Wait for U" (with Future and Tems)	Best Collaboration	Won
2022	"Jimmy Cooks" (with 21 Savage)	Best Collaboration	Nominated
2022	"Way 2 Sexy" (with Future and Young Thug)	Best Collaboration	Nominated
2022	"Way 2 Sexy" (with Future and Young Thug)	Best Hip Hop Video	Nominated
2022	"Way 2 Sexy" (with Future and Young Thug)	Song of the Year	Nominated
2022	"Churchill Downs"	Sweet 16: Best Featured Verse	Won
2023	Himself	Hip Hop Artist of the Year	Nominated
2023	Himself	Best Live Performer	Nominated
2023	Himself	Lyricist of the Year	Nominated
2023	Himself	Hustler of the Year	Nominated
2023	Her Loss	Album of the Year	Won
2023	"Spin Bout U" (with 21 Savage)	Best Hip Hop Video	Nominated
2023	Himself and 21 Savage	Best Duo/Group	Won
2023	"Rich Flex" (with 21 Savage)	Song of the Year	Nominated
2023	"Oh U Went"	Sweet 16: Best Featured Verse	Nominated

== Billboard Music Awards ==
The Billboard Music Award had been discontinued since 2007, but returned in 2011. Drake has won a record thirty nine awards. He was presented with the Billboard Artist of the Decade award for the 2010s, with the other finalists being Taylor Swift, Bruno Mars, Rihanna and Adele.

Year	Nominated work	Award	Result
2011	Himself	Top Radio Songs Artist	Nominated
2011	Himself	Top Rap Artist	Nominated
2011	Himself	Top Male Artist	Nominated
2011	Thank Me Later	Top Rap Album	Nominated
2011	"What's My Name?" (with Rihanna)	Top R&B Song	Nominated
2012	Himself	Top Male Artist	Nominated
2012	Himself	Top Rap Artist	Nominated
2012	Take Care	Billboard 200 Album	Nominated
2012	Take Care	Top Rap Album	Nominated
2013	Himself	Top Male Artist	Nominated
2013	Himself	Top Streaming Artist	Nominated
2013	Himself	Top Rap Artist	Nominated
2014	Himself	Top Male Artist	Nominated
2014	Himself	Top Rap Artist	Nominated
2014	Nothing Was the Same	Billboard 200 Album	Nominated
2014	Nothing Was the Same	Top Rap Album	Nominated
2014	"Hold On, We're Going Home" (with Majid Jordan)	Top R&B Song	Nominated
2015	Himself	Top Rap Artist	Nominated
2015	Himself	Top Male Artist	Nominated
2015	If You're Reading This It's Too Late	Top Rap Album	Nominated
2015	"Odio" (with Romeo Santos)	Top Latin Song	Nominated
2016	Himself	Top Artist	Nominated
2016	Himself	Top Male Artist	Nominated
2016	Himself	Top Billboard 200 Artist	Nominated
2016	Himself	Top Hot 100 Artist	Nominated
2016	Himself	Top Song Sales Artist	Nominated
2016	Himself	Top Streaming Songs Artist	Nominated
2016	Himself	Top Rap Artist	Won
2016	Himself	Billboard Chart Achievement Award	Nominated
2016	If You're Reading This It's Too Late	Top Rap Album	Nominated
2016	What a Time to Be Alive (with Future)	Top Rap Album	Nominated
2016	"Hotline Bling"	Top Streaming Song (Audio)	Nominated
2016	"Hotline Bling"	Top Rap Song	Nominated
2017	Himself	Top Artist	Won
2017	Himself	Top Hot 100 Artist	Won
2017	Himself	Top Male Artist	Won
2017	Himself	Top Billboard 200 Artist	Won
2017	Himself	Top Song Sales Artist	Won
2017	Himself	Top Radio Songs Artist	Nominated
2017	Himself	Top Streaming Songs Artist	Won
2017	Himself	Top Rap Artist	Won
2017	Views	Top Billboard 200 Album	Won
2017	Views	Top Rap Album	Won
2017	"One Dance" (with Wizkid and Kyla)	Top Hot 100 Song	Nominated
2017	"One Dance" (with Wizkid and Kyla)	Top Selling Song	Nominated
2017	"One Dance" (with Wizkid and Kyla)	Top Radio Song	Nominated
2017	"One Dance" (with Wizkid and Kyla)	Top Streaming Song (Audio)	Won
2017	"One Dance" (with Wizkid and Kyla)	Top Collaboration	Nominated
2017	"One Dance" (with Wizkid and Kyla)	Top R&B Song	Won
2017	"One Dance" (with Wizkid and Kyla)	Top R&B Collaboration	Won
2017	"Come and See Me" (with PartyNextDoor)	Top R&B Collaboration	Nominated
2017	"Work" (with Rihanna)	Top R&B Collaboration	Nominated
2017	"Work" (with Rihanna)	Top R&B Song	Nominated
2017	"Fake Love"	Top Rap Song	Nominated
2017	Boy Meets World Tour	Top Rap Tour	Won
2018	Himself	Top Artist	Nominated
2018	Himself	Top Male Artist	Nominated
2018	Himself	Top Billboard 200 Artist	Won
2018	Himself	Top Streaming Artist	Nominated
2018	Himself	Top Rap Artist	Nominated
2018	Himself	Top Rap Male Artist	Nominated
2018	Himself	Billboard Chart Achievement (fan-voted)	Nominated
2018	More Life	Top Billboard 200 Album	Nominated
2018	More Life	Top Rap Album	Nominated
2019	Himself	Billboard Chart Achievement Award	Nominated
2019	Himself	Top Artist	Won
2019	Himself	Top Male Artist	Won
2019	Himself	Top Billboard 200 Artist	Won
2019	Himself	Top Hot 100 Artist	Won
2019	Himself	Top Song Sales Artist	Won
2019	Himself	Top Radio Songs Artist	Won
2019	Himself	Top Streaming Songs Artist	Won
2019	Himself	Top Rap Artist	Won
2019	Himself	Top Rap Male Artist	Won
2019	Himself	Top Rap Tour	Nominated
2019	Scorpion	Top Billboard 200 Album	Won
2019	Scorpion	Top Rap Album	Won
2019	"In My Feelings"	Top Streaming Song (Video)	Won
2019	"In My Feelings"	Top Selling Song	Nominated
2019	"In My Feelings"	Top Rap Song	Nominated
2019	"Mia" (with Bad Bunny)	Top Latin Song	Nominated
2021	Himself	Artist of the Decade	Won
2021	Himself	Top Artist	Nominated
2021	Himself	Top Male Artist	Nominated
2021	Himself	Top Billboard 200 Artist	Nominated
2021	Himself	Top Hot 100 Artist	Nominated
2021	Himself	Top Streaming Songs Artist	Won
2021	Himself	Top Rap Artist	Nominated
2021	"Life Is Good" (with Future)	Top Streaming Song	Nominated
2022	Himself	Top Artist	Won
2022	Himself	Top Male Artist	Won
2022	Himself	Top Billboard 200 Artist	Nominated
2022	Himself	Top Hot 100 Artist	Nominated
2022	Himself	Top Streaming Artist	Nominated
2022	Himself	Top Rap Artist	Won
2022	Himself	Top Rap Make Artist	Won
2022	Certified Lover Boy	Top Billboard 200 Album	Nominated
2022	Certified Lover Boy	Top Rap Album	Won
2022	Knife Talk (featuring 21 Savage and Project Pat)	Top Rap Song	Nominated
2022	Way 2 Sexy (featuring Future and Young Thug)	Top Rap Song	Nominated
2023	Himself	Top Artist	Nominated
2023	Himself	Top Male Artist	Nominated
2023	Himself	Top Billboard 200 Artist	Nominated
2023	Himself	Top Hot 100 Artist	Nominated
2023	Himself	Top Streaming Songs Artist	Nominated
2023	Himself	Top Rap Artist	Won
2023	Himself	Top Rap Male Artist	Won
2023	Himself	Top Rap Touring Artist	Won
2023	Himself	Top Dance/Electronic Artist	Nominated
2023	Her Loss (with 21 Savage)	Top Billboard 200 Album	Nominated
2023	Her Loss (with 21 Savage)	Top Rap Album	Won
2023	Honestly, Nevermind	Top R&B Album	Nominated
2023	Honestly, Nevermind	Top Dance/Electronic Album	Nominated
2023	"Rich Flex" (with 21 Savage)	Top Rap Song	Won
2024	Himself	Top Rap Artist	Won
2024	Himself	Top Male Artist	Won
2024	For All the Dogs	Top Rap Album	Won

== Billboard Latin Music Awards ==
Year	Nominated work	Award	Result
2015	Himself	Crossover Artist of the Year	Won
2015	"Odio" (with Romeo Santos)	Hot Latin Song of the Year	Nominated
2015	"Odio" (with Romeo Santos)	Hot Latin Song of the Year, Vocal Event	Nominated
2015	"Odio" (with Romeo Santos)	Airplay Song of the Year	Nominated
2015	"Odio" (with Romeo Santos)	Digital Song of the Year	Nominated
2015	"Odio" (with Romeo Santos)	Streaming Song of the Year	Nominated
2015	"Odio" (with Romeo Santos)	Tropical Song of the Year	Won
2019	Himself	Crossover Artist of the Year	Nominated
2019	"MIA" (with Bad Bunny)	Hot Latin Song of the Year, Vocal Event	Nominated
2020	Himself	Crossover Artist of the Year	Nominated

== Berlin Music Video Awards ==
The Berlin Music Video Awards is an international music festival that promotes the art of music videos.

Year	Nominee / work	Award	Result
2019	SICKO MODE	Best VFX	Nominated

== BMI Awards ==
The BMI Awards are held annually by Broadcast Music, Inc. to award songwriters in various genres, including Hip-Hop/R&B, country and pop.

=== BMI R&B/Hip-Hop Awards ===
Year	Nominee / work	Award	Result	Ref.
2010	"Best I Ever Had"	Most-Performed Urban Songs Of The Year	Won	
2010	"Every Girl" (with Young Money)	Most-Performed Urban Songs Of The Year	Won	
2010	"Forever" (with Kanye West, Eminem, and Lil Wayne)	Most-Performed Urban Songs Of The Year	Won	
2010	"Successful" (with Trey Songz and Lil Wayne)	Most-Performed Urban Songs Of The Year	Won	
2011	Himself	Urban Songwriter of the Year	Won	
2011	"BedRock" (with Young Money and Lloyd)	Award Winning Songs	Won	
2011	"Find Your Love"	Award Winning Songs	Won	
2011	"I Invented Sex" (with Trey Songz)	Award Winning Songs	Won	
2011	"Money to Blow" (with Birdman and Lil Wayne)	Award Winning Songs	Won	
2011	"Over"	Award Winning Songs	Won	
2011	"Say Something" (with Timbaland)	Award Winning Songs	Won	
2011	"Un-Thinkable (I'm Ready)" (with Alicia Keys)	Award Winning Songs	Won	
2012	Himself	Urban Songwriters of the Year	Won	
2012	"Aston Martin Music" (with Rick Ross and Chrisette Michele)	Urban Winning Songs	Won	
2012	"Headlines"	Urban Winning Songs	Won	
2012	"I'm on One" (with DJ Khaled, Rick Ross, and Lil Wayne)	Urban Winning Songs	Won	
2012	"Moment 4 Life" (with Nicki Minaj)	Urban Winning Songs	Won	
2012	"Right Above It" (with Lil Wayne)	Urban Winning Songs	Won	
2012	"She Will" (with Lil Wayne)	Urban Winning Songs	Won	
2012	"What's My Name" (with Rihanna)	Urban Winning Songs	Won	
2012	"Make Me Proud" (with Nicki Minaj)	Hot R&B/Hip-Hop Airplay & Hot R&B/Hip-Hop Songs	Won	
2012	"The Motto" (with Lil Wayne)	Hot R&B/Hip-Hop Airplay & Hot R&B/Hip-Hop Songs	Won	
2012	"She Will" (with Lil Wayne)	Hot R&B/Hip-Hop Airplay & Hot R&B/Hip-Hop Songs	Won	
2012	"Headlines"	Hot Rap Songs	Won	
2012	"Make Me Proud" (with Nicki Minaj)	Hot Rap Songs	Won	
2012	"The Motto" (with Lil Wayne)	Hot Rap Songs	Won	
2013	"Make Me Proud" (with Nicki Minaj)	Most-Performed Songs	Won	
2013	"No Lie" (with 2 Chainz)	Most-Performed Songs	Won	
2013	"Take Care" (with Rihanna)	Most-Performed Songs	Won	
2013	"The Motto" (with Lil Wayne)	Most-Performed Songs	Won	
2013	"Fuckin' Problems" (with ASAP Rocky, 2 Chainz, and Kendrick Lamar)	Billboard No. 1s Hot R&B/Hip-Hop Airplay	Won	
2013	"No Lie" (with 2 Chainz)	Billboard No. 1s Hot R&B/Hip-Hop Airplay	Won	
2013	"Started From the Bottom"	Billboard No. 1s Hot R&B/Hip-Hop Airplay	Won	
2013	"No Lie" (with 2 Chainz)	Billboard No. 1s Hot R&B/Hip-Hop Songs	Won	
2013	"No Lie" (with 2 Chainz)	Billboard No. 1s Hot Rap Songs	Won	
2014	"Fuckin' Problems" (with ASAP Rocky, 2 Chainz, and Kendrick Lamar)	35 Most Performed R&B/Hip-Hop Songs	Won	
2014	"Love Me" (with 2 Chainz)	35 Most Performed R&B/Hip-Hop Songs	Won	
2014	"Poetic Justice" (with Kendrick Lamar)	35 Most Performed R&B/Hip-Hop Songs	Won	
2014	“Pop That” (with French Montana, Rick Ross, and Lil Wayne)	35 Most Performed R&B/Hip-Hop Songs	Won	
2014	“Started from the Bottom”	35 Most Performed R&B/Hip-Hop Songs	Won	
2015	“All Me” (with 2 Chainz and Big Sean)	35 Most Performed R&B/Hip-Hop Songs	Won	
2015	"Believe Me" (with Lil Wayne)	35 Most Performed R&B/Hip-Hop Songs	Won	
2015	"Trophies" (with Young Money)	35 Most Performed R&B/Hip-Hop Songs	Won	
2015	"Tuesday" (with iLoveMakonnen)	35 Most Performed R&B/Hip-Hop Songs	Won	
2015	"Who Do You Love?" (with YG)	35 Most Performed R&B/Hip-Hop Songs	Won	
2016	"Hotline Bling"	35 Most Performed R&B/Hip-Hop Songs	Won	
2016	"Only" (with Nicki Minaj, Lil Wayne, and Chris Brown)	35 Most Performed R&B/Hip-Hop Songs	Won	
2016	"Truffle Butter" (with Nicki Minaj and Lil Wayne)	35 Most Performed R&B/Hip-Hop Songs	Won	
2016	"Where Ya At" (with Future)	35 Most Performed R&B/Hip-Hop Songs	Won	
2017	"Back to Back"	35 Most Performed R&B/Hip-Hop Songs	Won	
2017	“For Free” (with DJ Khaled)	35 Most Performed R&B/Hip-Hop Songs	Won	
2017	"Jumpman" (with Future)	35 Most Performed R&B/Hip-Hop Songs	Won	
2017	“One Dance” (with Wizkid and Kyla)	35 Most Performed R&B/Hip-Hop Songs	Won	
2017	“Pop Style” (with The Throne)	35 Most Performed R&B/Hip-Hop Songs	Won	
2017	“Too Good” (with Rihanna)	35 Most Performed R&B/Hip-Hop Songs	Won	
2017	“Work” (with Rihanna)	35 Most Performed R&B/Hip-Hop Songs	Won	
2018	"Both" (with Gucci Mane)	35 Most Performed R&B/Hip-Hop Songs	Won	
2018	"Fake Love"	35 Most Performed R&B/Hip-Hop Songs	Won	
2018	"Passionfruit"	35 Most Performed R&B/Hip-Hop Songs	Won	
2019	"God's Plan"	R&B/Hip-Hop Song of the Year	Won	
2019	"God's Plan"	35 Most Performed R&B/Hip-Hop Songs	Won	
2019	"In My Feelings"	35 Most Performed R&B/Hip-Hop Songs	Won	
2019	"Look Alive" (with BlocBoy JB)	35 Most Performed R&B/Hip-Hop Songs	Won	
2019	"Nice For What"	35 Most Performed R&B/Hip-Hop Songs	Won	
2019	"Nonstop"	35 Most Performed R&B/Hip-Hop Songs	Won	
2019	"Sicko Mode" (with Travis Scott)	35 Most Performed R&B/Hip-Hop Songs	Won	
2019	"Walk It Talk It" (with Migos)	35 Most Performed R&B/Hip-Hop Songs	Won	
2019	"Yes Indeed" (with Lil Baby)	35 Most Performed R&B/Hip-Hop Songs	Won	
2020	"Money in the Grave" (with Rick Ross)	Most Performed R&B/Hip-Hop Songs of the Year	Won	
2020	"No Guidance" (with Chris Brown)	Most Performed R&B/Hip-Hop Songs of the Year	Won	
2021	"Laugh Now Cry Later" (with Lil Durk)	Most Performed R&B/Hip-Hop Songs of the Year	Won	
2021	"Life Is Good" (with Future)	Most Performed R&B/Hip-Hop Songs of the Year	Won	
2021	"Popstar" (with DJ Khaled)	Most Performed R&B/Hip-Hop Songs of the Year	Won	
2022	"Girls Want Girls" (with Lil Baby)	Most Performed R&B/Hip-Hop Songs of the Year	Won	
2022	"Way 2 Sexy" (with Future and Young Thug)	Most Performed R&B/Hip-Hop Songs of the Year	Won	
2022	"You're Mines Still" (with Yung Bleu)	Most Performed R&B/Hip-Hop Songs of the Year	Won	
2023	"Jimmy Cooks" (with 21 Savage)	Most Performed R&B/Hip-Hop Songs of the Year	Won	
2023	"Knife Talk" (with 21 Savage and Project Pat)	Most Performed R&B/Hip-Hop Songs of the Year	Won	
2023	"Wait for U" (with Future)	Most Performed R&B/Hip-Hop Songs of the Year	Won	

=== BMI London Awards ===
Year	Nominee / work	Award	Result	Ref.
2012	"Marvins Room"	London Pop Award Songs	Won	
2017	“One Dance” (with Wizkid and Kyla)	London Pop Award Songs	Won	
2017	"Summer Sixteen"	London Pop Award Songs	Won	
2018	"Passionfruit"	London Pop Award Songs	Won	
2018	"Portland" (with Quavo and Travis Scott)	London Pop Award Songs	Won	
2019	"Sicko Mode" (with Travis Scott)	London Pop Award Songs	Won	
2021	"Life Is Good" (with Future)	Most Performed Songs of the Year	Won	
2022	"Girls Want Girls" (with Lil Baby)	Most Performed Songs of the Year	Won	
2022	"Way 2 Sexy" (with Future and Young Thug)	Most Performed Songs of the Year	Won	
2023	"Champagne Poetry"	Most Performed Songs of the Year	Won	
2023	"Massive"	Most Performed Songs of the Year	Won	
2023	"Staying Alive" (with DJ Khaled and Lil Baby)	Most Performed Songs of the Year	Won	

== Brit Awards ==
The Brit Awards are the British Phonographic Industry's annual pop music awards, and the British equivalent to the American Grammy Award. Drake received two awards out of six nominations.

Year	Nominee / work	Award	Result
2016	Himself	International Male Solo Artist	Nominated
2017	Himself	International Male Solo Artist	Won
2017	Himself and Future	International Group	Nominated
2018	Himself	International Male Solo Artist	Nominated
2019	Himself	International Male Solo Artist	Won
2022	"Girls Want Girls" (with Lil Baby)	International Song	Nominated
2023	Himself and 21 Savage	International Group	Nominated

== Clio Awards ==
The Clio Awards is an annual award program that recognizes innovation and creativity in advertising, design and communication.

Year	Nominee / work	Award	Result	Ref.
2018	“God's Plan”	Bronze Winner for Best Music Video	Won	

== Danish Music Awards ==
Year	Nominee / work	Award	Result
2014	Nothing Was the Same	International Album of the Year	Nominated
2015	If You're Reading This It's Too Late	International Album of the Year	Nominated
2016	Views	International Album of the Year	Nominated
2019	Scorpion	International Album of the Year	Nominated

== Fonogram Awards ==
Fonogram Awards is the national music awards of Hungary, held every year since 1992 and promoted by Mahasz.

Year	Nominee / work	Award	Result	Ref.
2015	Nothing Was the Same	Best Foreign Rap or Hip-Hop Album of the Year	Nominated	
2016	If You're Reading This It's Too Late	Best Foreign Rap or Hip-Hop Album of the Year	Nominated	
2017	Views	Best Foreign Rap or Hip-Hop Album of the Year	Won	
2018	More Life	Best Foreign Rap or Hip-Hop Album of the Year	Nominated	
2019	Scorpion	Best Foreign Rap or Hip-Hop Album of the Year	Nominated	
2022	Certified Lover Boy	Best Foreign Rap or Hip-Hop Album of the Year	Nominated	

== GAFFA Awards ==
=== GAFFA Awards (Norway) ===
Delivered since 2012. The GAFFA Awards (Norwegian: GAFFA Prisen) are a Norwegian award that rewards popular music awarded by the magazine of the same name.

Year	Nominee / work	Award	Result
2018	Himself	International Solo Artist of the Year	Nominated
2018	Scorpion	International Album of the Year	Nominated
2018	"God's Plan"	International Song of the Year	Nominated

=== GAFFA Awards (Sweden) ===
Delivered since 2010. The GAFFA Awards (Swedish: GAFFA Priset) are a Swedish award that rewards popular music awarded by the magazine of the same name.

Year	Nominee / work	Award	Result
2018	More Life	Best Foreign Album	Nominated
2018	Himself	Best Foreign Solo Act	Nominated
2019	Himself	Best Foreign Solo Act	Nominated
2019	"In My Feelings"	Best Foreign Song	Nominated

== Global Awards ==
Year	Nominee / work	Award	Result
2018	Himself	Best Male	Nominated
2018	Himself	Best R&B/Hip-hop or Grime	Nominated
2019	Himself	Best Male	Nominated
2019	Himself	Best R&B/Hip-hop or Grime	Nominated
2019	"In My Feelings"	Best Song	Nominated

== Grammy Awards ==
The Grammy Awards are awarded annually by the National Academy of Recording Arts and Sciences. Drake has won 5 awards from 55 nominations. In 2022, Drake was nominated for 2 awards, but requested that he be removed from the nominations list.

Year	Nominee / work	Award	Result
2010	"Best I Ever Had"	Best Rap Solo Performance	Nominated
2010	"Best I Ever Had"	Best Rap Song	Nominated
2011	Himself	Best New Artist	Nominated
2011	"Over"	Best Rap Solo Performance	Nominated
2011	"Fancy" (with Swizz Beatz and T.I.)	Best Rap Performance by a Duo or Group	Nominated
2011	Thank Me Later	Best Rap Album	Nominated
2012	Loud (as featured artist)	Album of the Year	Nominated
2012	"Moment 4 Life" (with Nicki Minaj)	Best Rap Performance	Nominated
2012	"I'm on One" (with DJ Khaled, Rick Ross and Lil Wayne)	Best Rap/Sung Collaboration	Nominated
2012	"What's My Name?" (with Rihanna)	Best Rap/Sung Collaboration	Nominated
2013	"HYFR (Hell Ya Fucking Right)" (with Lil Wayne)	Best Rap Performance	Nominated
2013	"The Motto" (with Lil Wayne)	Best Rap Song	Nominated
2013	Take Care	Best Rap Album	Won
2014	good kid, m.A.A.d city (as featured artist)	Album of the Year	Nominated
2014	"Started from the Bottom"	Best Rap Performance	Nominated
2014	"Started from the Bottom"	Best Rap Song	Nominated
2014	"Fuckin' Problems" (with ASAP Rocky, 2 Chainz and Kendrick Lamar)	Best Rap Song	Nominated
2014	Nothing Was the Same	Best Rap Album	Nominated
2015	Beyoncé (as featured artist)	Album of the Year	Nominated
2015	"0 to 100 / The Catch Up"	Best Rap Performance	Nominated
2015	"0 to 100 / The Catch Up"	Best Rap Song	Nominated
2015	"Back to Back"	Best Rap Performance	Nominated
2016	"Truffle Butter" (with Nicki Minaj and Lil Wayne)	Best Rap Performance	Nominated
2016	"Energy"	Best Rap Song	Nominated
2016	"Tuesday" (with ILoveMakonnen)	Best Rap/Sung Collaboration	Nominated
2016	"Only" (with Nicki Minaj, Lil Wayne and Chris Brown)	Best Rap/Sung Collaboration	Nominated
2016	If You're Reading This It's Too Late	Best Rap Album	Nominated
2017	"Work" (with Rihanna)	Record of the Year	Nominated
2017	"Work" (with Rihanna)	Best Pop Duo/Group Performance	Nominated
2017	Views	Album of the Year	Nominated
2017	Views	Best Rap Album	Nominated
2017	"Come and See Me" (with PartyNextDoor)	Best R&B Song	Nominated
2017	"Pop Style" (with The Throne)	Best Rap Performance	Nominated
2017	"Hotline Bling"	Best Rap Song	Won
2017	"Hotline Bling"	Best Rap/Sung Performance	Won
2019	"God's Plan"	Record of the Year	Nominated
2019	"God's Plan"	Song of the Year	Nominated
2019	"God's Plan"	Best Rap Song	Won
2019	Scorpion	Album of the Year	Nominated
2019	"Nice for What"	Best Rap Performance	Nominated
2019	"Sicko Mode" (with Travis Scott, Swae Lee and Big Hawk)	Best Rap Performance	Nominated
2019	"Sicko Mode" (with Travis Scott, Swae Lee and Big Hawk)	Best Rap Song	Nominated
2020	"No Guidance" (with Chris Brown)	Best R&B Song	Nominated
2020	"Gold Roses" (with Rick Ross)	Best Rap Song	Nominated
2021	"Laugh Now Cry Later" (with Lil Durk)	Best Rap Song	Nominated
2021	"Laugh Now Cry Later" (with Lil Durk)	Best Melodic Rap Performance	Nominated
2021	"Life Is Good" (with Future)	Best Music Video	Nominated
2023	Renaissance (as songwriter)	Album of the Year	Nominated
2023	"Wait for U" (with Future and Tems)	Best Rap Song	Nominated
2023	"Wait for U" (with Future and Tems)	Best Melodic Rap Performance	Won
2023	"Churchill Downs" (with Jack Harlow)	Best Rap Song	Nominated
2024	"Rich Flex" (with 21 Savage)	Best Rap Performance	Nominated
2024	"Rich Flex" (with 21 Savage)	Best Rap Song	Nominated
2024	"Spin Bout U" (with 21 Savage)	Best Melodic Rap Performance	Nominated
2024	Her Loss (with 21 Savage)	Best Rap Album	Nominated
2026	"Somebody Loves Me" (with PartyNextDoor)	Best Melodic Rap Performance	Nominated
2027	"Ahí" (with Karol G)	Best Latin Song	Pending

== iHeartRadio Much Music Video Awards ==
The iHeartRadio Much Music Video Awards (formerly known as MuchMusic Video Awards) are annual awards presented by the Canadian music video channel MuchMusic to honor the year's best music videos. In 2010, Drake had seven nominations, the most of any artist, winning two of them.

Year	Nominee / work	Award	Result
2010	"Successful" (with Trey Songz)	Cinematographer of the Year	Won
2010	"Successful" (with Trey Songz)	MuchVIBE Hip-Hop Video of the Year	Won
2010	"BedRock" (with Young Money and Lloyd)	International Video of the Year – Group	Nominated
2010	"Over"	International Video of the Year by a Canadian	Nominated
2010	"Forever" (with Kanye West, Lil Wayne and Eminem)	International Video of the Year by a Canadian	Nominated
2010	"Forever" (with Kanye West, Lil Wayne and Eminem)	UR Fave: Canadian Video	Nominated
2010	"Forever" (with Kanye West, Lil Wayne and Eminem)	UR Fave: New Artist	Nominated
2011
2011	Himself	UR Fave: Artist	Nominated
2011	"Find Your Love"	International Video of the Year by a Canadian	Won
2012
2012	Himself	UR: Fave Artist	Nominated
2012	"Headlines"	Video Of The Year	Nominated
2012	"Headlines"	UR Fave: Video	Nominated
2012	"Take Care" (with Rihanna)	International Video of the Year by a Canadian	Nominated
2012	"The Motto" (with Lil Wayne and Tyga)	MuchVibe Best Rap Video	Won
2013	"Started from the Bottom"	Video of the Year	Nominated
2013	"Started from the Bottom"	Director of the Year	Won
2013	"Started from the Bottom"	Hip-Hop Video of the Year	Won
2013	"Started from the Bottom"	Your Fave Video	Nominated
2013	Himself	Your Fave Artist/Group	Nominated
2014	"Worst Behavior"	Video of the Year	Nominated
2014	"Worst Behavior"	Director of the Year	Nominated
2014	"Worst Behavior"	Hip-Hop Video of the Year	Won
2014	"Worst Behavior"	Your Fave Video	Nominated
2014	"Live For" (with The Weeknd)	Video of the Year	Nominated
2014	"Hold On, We're Going Home" (with Majid Jordan)	International Video of the Year By a Canadian	Won
2014	Himself	Your Fave Artist/Group	Nominated
2015	"DnF" (with P Reign and Future)	Hip-Hop Video of the Year	Won
2015	Himself	Most Buzzworthy Canadian	Nominated
2015	Himself	Your Fave Artist/Group	Nominated
2016	"Hotline Bling"	Video of the Year	Won
2016	"Hotline Bling"	Director of the Year	Won
2016	"Hotline Bling"	Hip-Hop Video of the Year	Won
2016	"Hotline Bling"	Your Fave Video	Nominated
2016	"Hotline Bling"	Most Buzzworthy Canadian	Won
2016	"My Love" (with Majid Jordan)	Best MuchFACT Video	Won
2016	Himself	Your Fave Artist/Group	Nominated
2017	Himself	Most Buzzworthy Canadian Artist	Won
2017	Himself	Fan Fave Artist or Group	Nominated
2017	"One Dance" (with Wizkid and Kyla)	iHeartRadio Canadian Single of the Year	Won
2018	Himself	Artist of the Year	Nominated
2018	Himself	Best Hip Hop Artist or Group	Won
2018	"God's Plan"	Video of the Year	Nominated
2018	"God's Plan"	Fan Fave Video	Nominated
2018	"God's Plan"	Best Director	Won
2018	"Nice for What"	Best Director	Nominated
2018	"Nice for What"	Song of the Summer	Nominated

== iHeartRadio Music Awards ==
The iHeartRadio Music Awards is an American music awards show debuted in 2014. Drake has won eleven awards from twenty-three nominations.

Year	Nominated artist	Award	Result
2014	"Hold On, We're Going Home" (with Majid Jordan)	Song of the Year	Nominated
2014	"Hold On, We're Going Home" (with Majid Jordan)	Hip-Hop/R&B Song of the Year	Nominated
2014	"Started from the Bottom"	Hip-Hop/R&B Song of the Year	Nominated
2016	"Hotline Bling"	Most Meme-able Moment	Nominated
2016	"Hotline Bling"	Hip-Hop Song of the Year	Won
2016	"Truffle Butter" (with Nicki Minaj and Lil Wayne)	Hip-Hop Song of the Year	Nominated
2016	"Blessings" (with Big Sean and Kanye West)	Hip-Hop Song of the Year	Nominated
2016	Himself	Hip-Hop Artist of the Year	Won
2017	Himself	Hip-Hop Artist of the Year	Won
2017	Himself	Male Artist of the Year	Nominated
2017	Himself	Most Thumbed-Up Artist of the Year	Won
2017	"One Dance" (with Wizkid and Kyla)	Most Thumbed-Up Song of the Year	Won
2017	"One Dance" (with Wizkid and Kyla)	Song of the Year	Nominated
2017	"One Dance" (with Wizkid and Kyla)	Hip-Hop Song of the Year	Won
2017	"Controlla"	Hip-Hop Song of the Year	Nominated
2017	"For Free" (with DJ Khaled)	Hip-Hop Song of the Year	Nominated
2017	"Work" (with Rihanna)	R&B Song of the Year	Won
2017	"Work" (with Rihanna)	Best Collaboration	Won
2017	"Work" (with Rihanna)	Best Music Video	Nominated
2017	"Too Good" (with Rihanna)	Best Lyrics	Nominated
2017	Views	Hip-Hop Album of the Year	Won
2018	Himself	Hip-Hop Artist of the Year	Nominated
2019	Himself	Hip-Hop Artist of the Year	Nominated
2019	Himself	Male Artist of the Year	Won
2019	"God's Plan"	Song of the Year	Nominated
2019	"God's Plan"	Best Lyrics	Nominated
2019	"God's Plan"	Best Music Video	Nominated
2019	"God's Plan"	Most Thumbed Up Song	Won
2019	"God's Plan"	Hip-Hop Song of the Year	Won
2019	"In My Feelings"	Hip-Hop Song of the Year	Nominated
2019	"Nice for What"	Hip-Hop Song of the Year	Nominated
2019	Scorpion	Hip-Hop Album of the Year	Won
2020	Himself	Hip-Hop Artist of the Year	Won
2021	"Life Is Good" (with Future)	Hip-Hop Song of the Year	Nominated
2021	"Life Is Good" (with Future)	Best Music Video	Nominated
2022	Himself	Male Artist of the Year	Nominated
2022	Himself	Hip-Hop Artist of the Year	Won
2022	"Way 2 Sexy" (with Future and Young Thug)	Hip-Hop Song of the Year	Nominated
2022	Certified Lover Boy	Best Comeback Album	Nominated
2023	Himself	Artist of the Year	Nominated
2023	Himself	Hip-Hop Artist of the Year	Won
2023	"Wait for U" (with Future and Tems)	Best Collaboration	Nominated
2023	"Wait for U" (with Future and Tems)	Hip-Hop Song of the Year	Won
2023	"Girls Want Girls" (with Lil Baby)	Hip-Hop Song of the Year	Nominated
2023	"Staying Alive" (with DJ Khaled and Lil Baby)	Favorite Use of a Sample	Nominated

== iHeartRadio Titanium Awards ==
iHeartRadio Titanium Awards are awarded to an artist when their song reaches 1 Billion Spins across iHeartRadio Stations.

Year	Nominee/Work		Result	Ref
2018	"God's Plan"	1 Billion Total Audience Spins on iHeartRadio Stations	Won	
2019	"Nice For What"	1 Billion Total Audience Spins on iHeartRadio Stations	Won	
2020	"Sicko Mode" (with Travis Scott)	1 Billion Total Audience Spins on iHeartRadio Stations	Won	
2020	"No Guidance" (with Chris Brown)	1 Billion Total Audience Spins on iHeartRadio Stations	Won	
2022	"Laugh Now Cry Later" (with Lil Durk)	1 Billion Total Audience Spins on iHeartRadio Stations	Won	

== Juno Awards ==
The Juno Awards are presented annually to musicians to acknowledge artistic and technical achievements in all aspects of Canadian music. Drake has won six awards from twenty nominations.

Year	Nominee / work	Award	Result
2010	Himself	New Artist of the Year	Won
2010	"Best I Ever Had"	Single of the Year	Nominated
2010	"Still Fly"	Rap Recording of the Year	Nominated
2010	So Far Gone	Rap Recording of the Year	Won
2011	Himself	Artist of the Year	Nominated
2011	Himself	Fan Choice Award	Nominated
2011	Himself	Songwriter of the Year	Nominated
2011	Thank Me Later	Album of the Year	Nominated
2011	Thank Me Later	Rap Recording of the Year	Nominated
2011	"Find Your Love"	Single of the Year	Nominated
2012	Himself	Artist of the Year	Nominated
2012	Himself	Fan Choice Award	Nominated
2012	Take Care	Album of the Year	Nominated
2012	Take Care	Rap Recording of the Year	Won
2013	Himself	Fan Choice Award	Nominated
2013	"HYFR" (with Lil Wayne)	Video of the Year	Won
2014	Himself	Artist of the Year	Nominated
2014	Himself	Fan Choice Award	Nominated
2014	Nothing Was the Same	Album of the Year	Nominated
2014	Nothing Was the Same	Rap Recording of the Year	Won
2015	Himself	Fan Choice Award	Nominated
2015	"Hold On, We're Going Home" (with Majid Jordan)	Single of the Year	Nominated
2016	Himself	Artist of the Year	Nominated
2016	Himself	Fan Choice Award	Nominated
2016	If You're Reading This It's Too Late	Album of the Year	Nominated
2016	If You're Reading This It's Too Late	Rap Recording of the Year	Won
2016	"Hotline Bling"	Single of the Year	Nominated
2017	Himself	Artist of the Year	Nominated
2017	Himself	Fan Choice Award	Nominated
2017	Views	Album of the Year	Nominated
2017	Views	Rap Recording of the Year	Nominated
2017	"One Dance" (with Wizkid and Kyla)	Single of the Year	Nominated

== Latin American Music Awards ==
The Latin American Music Awards (Latin AMAs) is an annual American music award to be presented by Telemundo.

Year	Nominee / work	Award	Result
2016	Drake	Favorite Crossover Artist	Nominated
2016	"One Dance" (with Wizkid and Kyla)	Favorite Crossover Song	Nominated
2019	Himself	Favorite Crossover Artist	Won
2019	"Mia" (with Bad Bunny)	Song of the Year	Nominated
2019	"Mia" (with Bad Bunny)	Favorite Song - Urban	Nominated

== London International Awards ==
The London International Awards, or LIA (formerly known as London International Advertising Awards, LIAA), are a worldwide awards annually honoring "pioneers, and embodiments of excellence" in advertising, digital media, production, design, music & sound and branded entertainment.

Year	Nominee / work	Award	Result
2016	"Hotline Bling"	Music Video: Best Music Video	Nominated

== LOS40 Music Awards ==
The LOS40 Music Awards, formerly known as Los Premios 40 Principales, are annual awards organized by Spanish music radio Los 40. Drake received three nominations

Year	Nominee / work	Award	Result
2016	Himself	International New Artist of the Year	Nominated
2016	"One Dance" (with Wizkid and Kyla)	International Song of the Year	Nominated
2016	Views	International Album of the Year	Nominated

== MOBO Awards ==
The Music of Black Origin (MOBO) Awards were established in 1996 by Kanya King. They are held annually in the United Kingdom to recognize artists of any race or nationality performing music of black origin. Drake has received five nominations.

Year	Nominee / work	Award	Result
2009	Himself	Best Hip-Hop Act	Nominated
2009	Himself	Best International Act	Nominated
2010	Himself	Best International Act	Nominated
2012	Himself	Best International Act	Nominated
2015	If You're Reading This It's Too Late	International Album	Won
2016	Himself	Best International Act	Won
2017	Himself	Best International Act	Nominated
2020	Himself	Best International Act	Nominated
2021	Himself	Best International Act	Nominated
2022	Himself	Best International Act	Nominated

== MTV ==
=== MTV Africa Music Awards ===
The MTV Africa Music Awards are an annual awards show from MTV Africa, established in 2013. Drake has received one award over two nominations.

Year	Nominee / work	Award	Result
2014	Himself	Best International Act	Nominated
2016	Himself	Best International Act	Won

=== MTV Video Music Awards ===
The MTV Video Music Awards were established in 1984 by MTV to celebrate the top music videos of the year. Drake has won three awards from 37 nominations.

Year	Nominee / work	Award	Result
2009	"Best I Ever Had"	Best New Artist	Nominated
2010	"Find Your Love"	Best Male Video	Nominated
2010	"Forever" (with Kanye West, Lil Wayne and Eminem)	Best Hip-Hop Video	Nominated
2012	"Take Care" (with Rihanna)	Video of the Year	Nominated
2012	"Take Care" (with Rihanna)	Best Male Video	Nominated
2012	"Take Care" (with Rihanna)	Best Art Direction	Nominated
2012	"Take Care" (with Rihanna)	Best Cinematography	Nominated
2012	"HYFR" (with Lil Wayne)	Best Hip-Hop Video	Won
2013	"Started from the Bottom"	Best Hip-Hop Video	Nominated
2013	"Started from the Bottom"	Best Direction	Nominated
2014	"Hold On, We're Going Home" (with Majid Jordan)	Best Hip-Hop Video	Won
2016	"Hotline Bling"	Best Hip-Hop Video	Won
2016	"Hotline Bling"	Video of the Year	Nominated
2016	"Hotline Bling"	Best Male Video	Nominated
2016	"Hotline Bling"	Best Art Direction	Nominated
2016	"One Dance" (with Wizkid and Kyla)	Song of Summer	Nominated
2018	"God's Plan"	Video of the Year	Nominated
2018	"God's Plan"	Song of the Year	Nominated
2018	"God's Plan"	Best Video with a Social Message	Nominated
2018	"God's Plan"	Best Direction	Nominated
2018	"God's Plan"	Best Hip Hop	Nominated
2018	"Walk It Talk It" (with Migos)	Best Hip Hop	Nominated
2018	Himself	Artist of the Year	Nominated
2018	"In My Feelings"	Song of Summer	Nominated
2019	"In My Feelings"	Song of the Year	Nominated
2019	"Sicko Mode" (with Travis Scott)	Best Hip Hop	Nominated
2019	"Mia" (with Bad Bunny)	Best Latin	Nominated
2020	"Life Is Good" (with Future)	Video of the Year	Nominated
2020	"Life Is Good" (with Future)	Best Collaboration	Nominated
2020	"Life Is Good" (with Future)	Best Hip Hop	Nominated
2020	"Toosie Slide"	Best Music Video From Home	Nominated
2020	"Popstar" (with DJ Khaled)	Song of Summer	Nominated
2021	"Popstar" (with DJ Khaled)	Video of the Year	Nominated
2021	"Popstar" (with DJ Khaled)	Best Direction	Nominated
2021	"Laugh Now Cry Later" (featuring Lil Durk)	Best Collaboration	Nominated
2021	"Laugh Now Cry Later" (featuring Lil Durk)	Best Hip Hop	Nominated
2021	"What's Next"	Best Editing	Nominated
2022	Himself	Artist of the Year	Nominated
2022	"Way 2 Sexy" (with Future and Young Thug)	Video of the Year	Nominated
2022	"Way 2 Sexy" (with Future and Young Thug)	Best Collaboration	Nominated
2022	"Way 2 Sexy" (with Future and Young Thug)	Best Art Direction	Nominated
2022	"Wait for U" (with Future and Tems)	Best Hip-Hop	Nominated
2022	"Wait for U" (with Future and Tems)	Song of Summer	Nominated
2022	Certified Lover Boy	Album of the Year	Nominated
2023	"Staying Alive" (with DJ Khaled and Lil Baby)	Best Hip-Hop	Nominated
2023	"Falling Back"	Best Direction	Nominated
2023	Himself	Show of the Summer	Nominated
2023	Her Loss (with 21 Savage)	Album of the Year	Nominated

=== MTV Europe Music Awards ===
The MTV Europe Music Awards are an annual awards show from MTV Europe established in 1994. Drake has received twenty-one nominations and two awards.

Year	Nominee / work	Award	Result
2012	Himself	Best Hip-Hop	Nominated
2012	Himself	Best North American Act	Nominated
2013	Himself	Best Hip-Hop Act	Nominated
2013	Himself	Best Canadian Act	Nominated
2014	Himself	Best Hip-Hop	Nominated
2014	Himself	Best Canadian Act	Nominated
2015	Himself	Best Hip-Hop	Nominated
2015	Himself	Best Canadian Act	Nominated
2016	Himself	Best Male	Nominated
2016	Himself	Best Hip-Hop	Won
2016	Himself	Best Canadian Act	Nominated
2016	"Work" (with Rihanna)	Best Song	Nominated
2017	Himself	Best Hip-Hop Act	Nominated
2017	Himself	Best Canadian Act	Nominated
2018	"God's Plan"	Best Song	Nominated
2018	Himself	Best Artist	Nominated
2018	Himself	Best Hip-Hop	Nominated
2018	Himself	Best Canadian Act	Nominated
2020	"Popstar" (with DJ Khaled)	Best Video	Won
2020	Himself	Best Hip-Hop Act	Nominated
2021	Himself	Best Hip-Hop Act	Nominated
2022	"Staying Alive" (with DJ Khaled and Lil Baby)	Best Collaboration	Nominated
2022	Himself	Best Hip-Hop	Nominated
2022	Himself	Best Canadian Act	Nominated
2023	Himself	Best Canadian Act	Nominated

=== MTV Video Music Awards Japan ===
The MTV Video Music Awards Japan is the Japan version of the American VMA. Drake has received one award from five nominations.

Year	Nominee / work	Award	Result
2012	"Headlines"	Best Hip-Hop Video	Nominated
2013	"Fuckin' Problems"	Best Hip-Hop Video	Won
2016	"Hotline Bling"	Best International Male Video	Nominated
2016	"Hotline Bling"	Best Hip-Hop Video	Nominated
2016	Views	International Album of the Year	Nominated

== NAACP Image Awards ==
The NAACP Image Awards is an award ceremony from the National Association for the Advancement of Colored People. Drake has received two awards from ten nominations.

Year	Nominee / work	Award	Result
2012	Drake and Mary J. Blige	Outstanding Duo or Group	Won
2020	"No Guidance" (with Chris Brown)	Outstanding Duo, Group or Collaboration	Nominated
2020	"No Guidance" (with Chris Brown)	Outstanding Music Video	Nominated
2021	Himself	Outstanding Male Artist	Won
2021	"Laugh Now Cry Later" (feat. Lil Durk)	Outstanding Hip Hop/Rap Song	Nominated
2021	"Life Is Good" (with Future)	Outstanding Hip Hop/Rap Song	Nominated
2022	Certified Lover Boy	Outstanding Album	Nominated
2022	Himself	Outstanding Male Artist	Nominated
2022	"Way 2 Sexy" (with Future and Young Thug)	Outstanding Duo, Group or Collaboration (Contemporary)	Nominated
2022	"Way 2 Sexy" (with Future and Young Thug)	Outstanding Hip Hop/Rap Song	Nominated
2023	Himself	Outstanding Male Artist	Nominated
2023	"Wait for U" (with Future and Tems)	Outstanding Duo, Group or Collaboration (Contemporary)	Nominated
2023	"Wait for U" (with Future and Tems)	Outstanding Hip Hop/Rap Song	Nominated
2024	For All the Dogs	Outstanding Album	Nominated

== Nickelodeon Kids' Choice Awards ==
The Nickelodeon Kids' Choice Awards, also known as the KCAs or Kids Choice Awards, is an annual awards show that airs on the Nickelodeon cable channel, that honors the year's biggest television, movie, and music acts, as voted by Nickelodeon viewers. Drake has received ten nominations.

Year	Nominee / work	Award	Result
2016	"Hotline Bling"	Favorite Song of the Year	Nominated
2016	Himself	Favorite Male Singer	Nominated
2017	Himself	Favorite Male Singer	Nominated
2019	Himself	Favorite Male Singer	Nominated
2019	"In My Feelings"	Favorite Song of the Year	Nominated
2019	"Sicko Mode" (with Travis Scott)	Favorite Collaboration	Nominated
2021	Himself	Favorite Male Artist	Nominated
2021	"Toosie Slide"	Favorite Song	Nominated
2022	Himself	Favorite Male Artist	Nominated
2022	Certified Lover Boy	Favorite Album	Nominated
2023	Himself	Favorite Male Artist	Nominated
2024	Himself	Favorite Male Artist	Nominated
2025	Himself	Favorite Male Artist	Nominated

== NRJ Music Awards ==
The NRJ Music Award is an award presented by the French radio station NRJ to honor the best in the French and worldwide music industry.

Year	Nominee / work	Award	Result
2018	"In My Feelings"	Video of the Year	Nominated
2018	"God's Plan"	International Song of the Year	Nominated
2018	Himself	International Male Artist of the Year	Nominated

== People's Choice Awards ==
The People's Choice Awards are an annual awards show from CBS to recognize the best of pop culture. Drake has received zero awards from twenty nominations.

Year	Nominee / work	Award	Result
2011	Himself	Favorite Hip Hop Artist	Nominated
2013	Himself	Favorite Hip Hop Artist	Nominated
2014	Himself	Favorite Hip Hop Artist	Nominated
2015	Himself	Favorite Hip Hop Artist	Nominated
2016	Himself	Favorite Hip Hop Artist	Nominated
2016	If You're Reading This It's Too Late	Favorite Album	Nominated
2017	Views	Favorite Album	Nominated
2017	"Work" (with Rihanna)	Favorite Song	Nominated
2017	"One Dance" (with Wizkid and Kyla)	Favorite Song	Nominated
2017	Himself	Favorite R&B Artist	Nominated
2017	Himself	Favorite Male Artist	Nominated
2018	Himself	Favorite Male Artist	Nominated
2018	Himself	The Most Hype Worthy Canadian of 2018	Nominated
2019	Himself	Male Artist of 2019	Nominated
2020	Himself	Male Artist of 2020	Nominated
2020	"Life Is Good" (with Future)	Music Video of 2020	Nominated
2020	"Life Is Good" (with Future)	Collaboration Song of 2020	Nominated
2021	Himself	Male Artist of 2021	Nominated
2021	Certified Lover Boy	Album of 2021	Nominated
2021	"Way 2 Sexy" (with Future and Young Thug)	Collaboration Song of 2021	Nominated
2022	Himself	Male Artist of 2022	Nominated
2022	"Wait for U" (with Future and Tems)	Song of 2022	Nominated
2022	"Jimmy Cooks" (with 21 Savage)	Collaboration Song of 2022	Nominated
2023	Himself	Male Artist of 2023	Nominated
2023	Himself	Hip-Hop Artist of 2023	Nominated
2023	For All the Dogs	Album of 2023	Nominated
2023	"First Person Shooter" (with J. Cole)	Collaboration Song of 2023	Nominated

== Polaris Music Prize ==
The Polaris Music Prize is a music award annually given to the best full-length Canadian album based on artistic merit, regardless of genre, sales, or record label.

Year	Nominee / work	Award	Result
2012	Take Care	Polaris Music Prize	Shortlisted
2014	Nothing Was the Same	Polaris Music Prize	Shortlisted
2015	If You're Reading This It's Too Late	Polaris Music Prize	Shortlisted
2016	Views	Polaris Music Prize	Longlisted
2017	More Life	Polaris Music Prize	Longlisted

== Primetime Emmy Awards ==
The Primetime Emmy Award is an American award bestowed by the Academy of Television Arts & Sciences (ATAS) in recognition of excellence in American primetime television programming.

Year	Nominee / work	Award	Result
2022	Euphoria	Outstanding Drama Series (Note: Shared with the producers of Euphoria.)	Nominated

== SOCAN Awards ==
The SOCAN Awards are an annual Canadian music industry award ceremony, honoring achievement in songwriting, composition, and publishing by its members. Drake has been awarded 12 times, including for Songwriter of the Year in 2019.

Year	Nominee / work	Award	Result
2014	Himself	Global Inspiration Award	Won
2014	"Hold On, We're Going Home"	International Song	Won
2014	"Hold On, We're Going Home"	Urban Music	Won
2016	"Hotline Bling"	Pop/Rock Music	Won
2016	"Hotline Bling"	Urban Music	Won
2017	Himself	International Achievement	Won
2017	"One Dance"	Pop/Rock Music	Won
2017	"Too Good"	Pop/Rock Music	Won
2018	"Fake Love"	Rap Music	Won
2019	Himself	Songwriter of the Year	Won
2020	"Sicko Mode"	Rap Music	Won
2020	"Money in the Grave"	Rap Music	Won
2020	"No Guidance"	R&B Music	Won

== Soul Train Music Awards ==
The Soul Train Music Awards is an annual award show aired in national broadcast syndication that honors the best in African American music and entertainment established in 1987. Drake has won six awards from forty-one nominations.

Year	Nominee / work	Award	Result
2009	Himself	Best New Artist	Nominated
2009	"Best I Ever Had"	Record of the Year	Nominated
2009	"Successful" (with Trey Songz)	Best Collaboration	Nominated
2010	Thank Me Later	Album of the Year	Nominated
2010	"Find Your Love"	Record of the Year	Nominated
2010	"Find Your Love"	Best Hip-Hop Song	Nominated
2010	"Unthinkable" (with Alicia Keys)	Record of the Year	Won
2011	"Moment 4 Life" (with Nicki Minaj)	Best Hip-Hop Song	Won
2012	"No Lie" (with 2 Chainz)	Best Hip-Hop Song	Nominated
2013	"Poetic Justice" (with Kendrick Lamar)	Best Hip-Hop Song	Nominated
2013	"Poetic Justice" (with Kendrick Lamar)	Song of the Year	Nominated
2013	"Started from the Bottom"	Best Hip-Hop Song	Nominated
2013	"Started from the Bottom"	Video of the Year	Nominated
2014	"Hold On, We're Going Home" (with Majid Jordan)	Best Hip-Hop Song	Nominated
2014	"Hold On, We're Going Home" (with Majid Jordan)	Song of the Year	Nominated
2014	Nothing Was the Same	Album of the Year	Nominated
2015	"Truffle Butter" (with Nicki Minaj and Lil Wayne)	Best Hip-Hop Song	Nominated
2015	"Blessings" (with Big Sean and Kanye West)	Best Hip-Hop Song	Nominated
2015	"Blessings" (with Big Sean and Kanye West)	Best Collaboration	Nominated
2016	Views	Album/Mixtape of the Year	Nominated
2016	"Hotline Bling"	Best Dance Performance	Nominated
2016	"Hotline Bling"	Video of the Year	Nominated
2016	"Work" (with Rihanna)	Video of the Year	Nominated
2016	"Work" (with Rihanna)	Best Dance Performance	Nominated
2016	"Work" (with Rihanna)	Best Collaboration	Nominated
2016	"Work" (with Rihanna)	Song of the Year	Nominated
2016	"Controlla"	Song of the Year	Nominated
2016	"Controlla"	Rhythm & Bars Award	Nominated
2016	"One Dance" (featuring Wizkid and Kyla)	Rhythm & Bars Award	Nominated
2016	"For Free" (with DJ Khaled)	Rhythm & Bars Award	Nominated
2016	"For Free" (with DJ Khaled)	Best Collaboration	Nominated
2017	"Come Closer" (with Wizkid)	Best Dance Performance	Nominated
2018	"In My Feelings"	Rhythm & Bars Award	Won
2019	"Going Bad" (with Meek Mill)	Rhythm & Bars Award	Nominated
2019	"No Guidance" (with Chris Brown)	The Ashford And Simpson Songwriter's Award	Nominated
2019	"No Guidance" (with Chris Brown)	Best Dance Performance	Won
2019	"No Guidance" (with Chris Brown)	Best Collaboration Performance	Won
2019	"No Guidance" (with Chris Brown)	Video of the Year	Nominated
2019	"No Guidance" (with Chris Brown)	Song of the Year	Won
2019	"Girls Need Love" (Remix) (with Summer Walker)	Song of the Year	Nominated
2020	"Popstar" (with DJ Khaled)	Rhythm & Bars Award	Nominated
2020	"Laugh Now Cry Later" (with Lil Durk)	Rhythm & Bars Award	Nominated
2021	"You're Mines Still" (with Yung Bleu)	Song of the Year	Nominated
2021	"You're Mines Still" (with Yung Bleu)	Best Collaboration	Nominated

== South African Hip Hop Awards ==
The annual South African Hip Hop Awards were established in 2012.

Year	Nominee / work	Award	Result	Ref.
2021	Himself	Best International Act	Nominated	

== Sucker Free Award ==
The Sucker Free Awards are an awards show hosted by MTV. Drake has received one award out of two nominations.

Year	Nominee / work	Award	Result
2011	"Headlines"	Club Banger: Song of the Year	Nominated
2011	Young Money	Best Crew	Won

== Teen Choice Awards ==
The Teen Choice Awards were established in 1999 to honor the year's biggest achievements in music, movies, sports and television, as voted for by young people aged between 13 and 19. Drake has been nominated for 13 awards, winning 2 with the Degrassi cast in 2005 and 2007, respectively.

Year	Nominee / work	Award	Result
2005	Degrassi: The Next Generation	Choice Summer Series	Won
2007	Degrassi: The Next Generation	Choice Summer TV Show	Won
2008	Degrassi: The Next Generation	Choice Summer TV Show	Nominated
2010	So Far Gone	Album – Rap	Nominated
2010	"Find Your Love"	Best Rap/Hip-Hop Track	Nominated
2010	Himself	Breakout Artist Male	Nominated
2010	Himself	Male Artist	Nominated
2010	Himself	Rap Artist	Nominated
2010	Himself	Summer Music Star – Male	Nominated
2012	Himself	Choice Music Male Artist	Nominated
2012	"Take Care" (featuring Rihanna)	Choice Music Single by a Male Artist	Nominated
2012	"Take Care" (featuring Rihanna)	Choice Music R&B/Hip-Hop Track	Nominated
2013	Himself	Choice Music: Rap Artist	Nominated
2013	"Started from The Bottom"	Choice Music: R&B/Hip-Hop Track	Nominated
2015	Himself	Choice Music: R&B/Hip-Hop Artist	Nominated
2016	Himself	Choice Music: R&B/Hip-Hop Artist	Nominated
2016	Himself	Choice Music Male Artist	Nominated
2016	Himself	Choice Summer Music Star: Male	Nominated
2016	"One Dance" (featuring Wizkid and Kyla)	Choice Music: R&B/Hip-Hop Song	Won
2018	Himself	Choice Male Artist	Nominated
2018	Himself	Choice R&B/Hip-Hop Artist	Nominated
2018	"God's Plan"	Choice Song: Male Artist	Nominated
2018	"God's Plan"	Choice R&B/Hip-Hop Song	Nominated
2018	"Nice for What"	Choice Summer Song	Nominated
2019	Himself	Choice R&B/Hip-Hop Artist	Nominated
2019	Himself	Choice Summer Male Artist	Nominated
2019	"Going Bad" (with Meek Mill)	Choice R&B/Hip-Hop Song	Nominated
2019	"Mia" (with Bad Bunny)	Choice Latin Song	Nominated

== Young Artist Award ==
The Young Artist Awards is an annual award show aired in national broadcast syndication that honors the best in African American music and entertainment established in 1987. As Aubrey Graham, Drake has won one award from five nominations.

Year	Nominee / work	Award	Result
2002	Degrassi: The Next Generation	Best Ensemble in a TV Series (Comedy or Drama)	Won
2003	Degrassi: The Next Generation	Best Ensemble in a TV Series (Comedy or Drama)	Nominated
2005	Degrassi: The Next Generation	Best Performance in a TV Series (Comedy or Drama) – Supporting Young Actor	Nominated
2005	Degrassi: The Next Generation	Outstanding Young Performers in a TV Series	Nominated
2006	Degrassi: The Next Generation	Best Young Ensemble Performance in a TV Series (Comedy or Drama)	Nominated

== Songwriters Hall of Fame ==
The Hal David Starlight Award is an award given yearly to a songwriter by the Songwriters Hall of Fame. Drake was the recipient in 2011.

Year	Nominee / work	Award	Result
2011	Himself	Hal David Starlight Award	Won

== Other accolades ==
- Ranked #3 Hottest MC by MTV (2009)
- Ranked #4 Hottest MC by MTV (2010)
- Ranked #2 Hottest MC by MTV (2011)
- Ranked #2 Hottest MC by MTV (2012)
- GQ Man of the Year for "Breakout of the Year" (2010)
- Named #4 Man of the Year by MTV (2010)
