= Fireworks (Drake song) =

Song by Drake featuring Alicia Keys

from the album Thank Me Later
- Released: May 26, 2010
- Recorded: 2010
- Studio: Metalworks Studios (Toronto, ON); NightBird Recording Studios (West Hollywood, CA)
- Genre: Hip hop; R&B
- Length: 5:13
- Label: Young Money; Cash Money; Motown
- Songwriters: Aubrey Drake Graham; Noah "40" Shebib; Matthew "Boi-1da" Samuels; Christian "Crada" Kalla; Alicia (Keys) Cook
- Producers: Noah "40" Shebib; Boi-1da (co); Crada (co)

"Fireworks" is a song by Canadian rapper Drake featuring American singer Alicia Keys from his debut album Thank Me Later (2010). The artists had previously collaborated on Keys' "Un-Thinkable (I'm Ready)". Originally, it was supposed to be the fourth single, but it was changed to Fancy.

== Background ==
Originally produced by German record producer Crada with additional production from Boi-1da and 40, Fireworks was one of the most anticipated songs off Thank Me Later. It was originally thought that Kings of Leon was on the chorus, however, due to lack of sample clearance, it was announced at a concert that Alicia Keys would sing the chorus.

Before his show at Slippery Rock University in Pennsylvania on Monday night April 5, 2010, Drizzy explained to MTV News why he was letting the crowd sample the song. "The song itself is the first song on the album; I think it's the biggest indicator of what the album is gonna be like," he said. "That's why I picked that song to go first, and that's why I wrote the first verse like that. It's really where I am in my life right now. I know they're looking forward to the album, so I want them to get a feel of how the story starts off." "Fireworks" starts with the actual sound of fireworks in the background. From there, Drizzy begins talking about his life, joking that his 15 minutes of fame started about an hour ago. "It truly is a story," he added of the album. "At no point in the album does it fall off and become about some songs I slapped together. It's all a story from beginning to end. Just like So Far Gone was. It's that time."

The song is about Drake's relationship with Rihanna.

== Live performances ==
Drake has performed the song while on his recent tour and also performed the first verse of "Fireworks" at the 2010 BET Awards. The song was performed in a medley along with "Over" and the remix of Young Jeezy's "Lose My Mind".

== Charts ==
Chart (2010)	Peak position
US Billboard Hot 100	71
US Bubbling Under R&B/Hip-Hop Singles (Billboard)	17
