= 2010 Soul Train Music Awards =

Music awards ceremony in Atlanta, US

Soul Train Music Awards
- Date: November 28, 2010
- Location: Cobb Energy Performing Arts Center, Atlanta, Georgia
- Country: United States
- Hosted by: Taraji P. Henson; Terrence Howard
- First award: 1987

Highlights
- Most awards: Usher and Alicia Keys (2)
- Website: soultrain.com

Television/radio coverage
- Network: BET, Centric

The 2010 Soul Train Music Awards were held at the Cobb Energy Performing Arts Center in Atlanta, Georgia on November 28, 2010. The show was hosted by Oscar nominated actor Terrence Howard and Oscar nominated actress Taraji P. Henson. Performers included El DeBarge, R. Kelly, Erykah Badu, Ron Isley, Lalah Hathaway, Bilal, Cee Lo Green. Tributes were made to artists Ron Isley, and Anita Baker.

== Special awards ==
=== Legend Award – Female ===
- Anita Baker

=== Legend Award – Male ===
- Ron Isley

== Winners and nominees ==
Winners are in bold text.

=== Album of the Year ===
- **Usher – Raymond vs. Raymond**
  - Erykah Badu – New Amerykah Part Two (Return of the Ankh)
  - Drake – Thank Me Later
  - Alicia Keys – The Element of Freedom
  - Sade – Soldier of Love

=== Song of the Year ===
- **B.o.B (featuring Bruno Mars) – "Nothing on You"**
  - Alicia Keys – "Un-Thinkable (I'm Ready)"
  - Monica – "Everything to Me"
  - Sade – "Soldier of Love"
  - Usher – "There Goes My Baby"

=== The Ashford & Simpson Songwriter’s Award ===
- **Alicia Keys – "Un-Thinkable (I'm Ready)"**
  - **Written by: Alicia Cook, Aubrey Graham, Kerry Brothers, Jr. and Noah Shebib**
- El DeBarge – "Second Chance"
  - Written by: Eldra DeBarge and Mischke Butler
- Drake – "Find Your Love"
  - Written by: Aubrey Graham, Patrick Reynolds, Jeff Bhasker and Kanye West
- Fantasia – "Bittersweet"
  - Written by: Claude Kelly and Charles Harmon
- R. Kelly – "When a Woman Loves"
  - Written by: Robert Kelly

=== Best Male R&B/Soul Artist ===
- **Trey Songz** (tie)
- **Usher** (tie)
  - Jaheim
  - Kem
  - Ne-Yo

=== Best Female R&B/Soul Artist ===
- **Alicia Keys**
  - Erykah Badu
  - Mary J. Blige
  - Fantasia
  - Monica

=== Best New Artist ===
- **Melanie Fiona**
  - B.o.B
  - Nicki Minaj
  - Dondria

=== Best Reggae Artist ===
- **Gyptian**
  - Jah Cure
  - Vybz Kartel
  - Damian Marley
  - Gramps Morgan
  - Mr. Vegas

=== CENTRIC Award ===
- **Janelle Monáe**
  - Corrine Bailey Rae
  - Jesse Boykins III
  - Dondria
  - Dwele

=== Best Hip-Hop Song of the Year ===
- **Eminem (featuring Rihanna) – "Love the Way You Lie"**
  - Big Boi (featuring Cutty) – "Shutterbugg"
  - Drake – "Find Your Love"
  - Nicki Minaj – "Your Love"
  - Rick Ross (featuring Styles P) – "B.M.F. (Blowin' Money Fast)"
  - T.I. (featuring Keri Hilson) – "Got Your Back"

=== Best Gospel Performance – Male, Female or Group ===
- **Marvin Sapp**
  - Lisa Page Brooks
  - Fred Hammond
  - Youthful Praise (featuring J.J. Hairston)
  - Tye Tribbett
  - Hezekiah Walker & LFC

=== Best Dance Performance ===
- **Ciara – "Ride"**
  - Janelle Monáe (featuring Big Boi) – "Tightrope"
  - Ne-Yo – "Beautiful Monster"
  - Rihanna – "Rude Boy"
  - Usher (featuring will.i.am) – "OMG"

== Performers ==
- R. Kelly
- Ne-Yo
- Erykah Badu
- Gyptian
- Janelle Monáe
- CeeLo Green
- Keyshia Cole
- Rick Ross

=== Tribute performers ===
Anita Baker Tribute

- Chrisette Michele
- Tamia
- Dionne Farris
- Faith Evans
- Kem
- El DeBarge
- Lalah Hathaway
- Rachelle Ferrell
- Goapele

Ron Isley Tribute

- Eric Benét
- Bilal
- Tank
- Freddie Jackson
- Jeffrey Osborne
- Chante Moore

== Telecast ==
The Soul Train Awards aired on BET and Centric on November 28, 2010. It was also broadcast on BET UK.

== See also ==
- Soul Train Awards
