= 9AM in Dallas =

"9AM In Dallas"

Promotional single by Drake

from the album Thank Me Later (UK Edition)
- Released: June 15, 2010
- Recorded: May 2010
- Genre: Hip hop; Freestyle rap
- Length: 3:39
- Label: Young Money; Cash Money; Universal Motown
- Songwriters: Aubrey Drake Graham; Matthew Burnett; Matthew Samuels
- Producer: Boi-1da

"9AM in Dallas" is a song by rapper Drake from his debut album Thank Me Later. It was released as a promotional track for the album on June 12, 2010, with its eventual release onto the iTunes Store on June 15. The song features the rapper making a freestyle, and due to strong sales it charted at number 57 in the Billboard Hot 100. Recorded in the days leading up to the release of the album, it was not included in the track list for the US version of the album but is present on the UK iTunes version as a bonus track. The release of the song also marks the start of an iconic series within Drake's discography, the time in place series, which includes tracks like 5AM in Toronto, 4PM in Calabasas and most recently 8AM in Charlotte.

== Charts ==
Chart (2010)	Peak position
Canadian Hot 100	55
US Billboard Hot 100	57
