= Miss Me =

Single by Drake featuring Lil Wayne

from the album Thank Me Later
- Released: June 1, 2010
- Recorded: 2009
- Genre: Hip hop
- Length: 5:06 (album version); 4:26 (radio edit 1); 4:16 (radio edit 2)
- Label: Young Money; Cash Money; Motown
- Songwriters: Aubrey Graham; Dwayne Carter; Matthew Samuels; Doug Edwards; Dave Richardson
- Producers: Boi-1da; 40

Drake singles chronology
"Find Your Love" (2010)	"Miss Me" (2010)	"Fancy" (2010)

Lil Wayne singles chronology
"Roger That" (2010)	"Miss Me" (2010)	"Right Above It" (2010)

"Miss Me" is the third single by Canadian recording artist Drake from his debut album Thank Me Later. The hip hop song features labelmate and Young Money founder Lil Wayne. It was produced by Drake's long-time collaborators Boi-1da and 40. It peaked at number fifteen on US Billboard Hot 100, becoming the third consecutive track to attain chart success from the album. It was certified platinum by the Recording Industry Association of America (RIAA).

== Background ==
The song was originally by rapper Bun B featuring Drake for his 3rd album, Trill OG, with a different chorus, entitled "All Night Long." This version was never released, but a version with Drake's and Bun B's verses and the final chorus was released as the "OG Mix", which is the official remix of the song, on September 13, 2010, on Bun B's Twitter page. The song samples "Wildflower" by Hank Crawford. "Miss Me" contains an interpolation of "Wuzhannanan'", performed by Soulja Boy. In January 2019, during an interview with the rapper who had his song interpolated at the Breakfast Club, he fiercely criticized Drake, claiming that he copied his music style and flow.

Drake told MTV News: "It's a song about being away from what you love and hoping that when you're gone, doing you, somebody out there misses you."

== Music video ==
The music video was directed by Anthony Mandler. Drake shot his scenes on July 15, 2010. Shots of Lil Wayne were filmed in early 2010 by director David Rousseau before Wayne went to jail. The video premiered at 8 PM Eastern Standard Time on August 19, 2010, on MTV.

Mandler told MTV that the video was a particular challenge because Lil Wayne's footage was shot prior to Mandler coming on board as director: "It wasn't shot the way I would have shot it, so I had to come up with a world where I had ultimate control. I think with Drake, we're always looking for overarching themes. We're always looking for bigger themes to hang our hat on. With 'Miss Me,' what was interesting to me was not the idea of 'miss me because Wayne was going to jail.' Because it was deeper than that. It was the attainability versus the unattainability. And how stars and people who are public figures are expected to sit on a platform and be grabbed and watched and photographed and controlled. The idea for me was, what happens if it's not that clear, everything is a click off, all these unrelated scenarios are related by a textual theme and trying to play that into that, rather than some straight narrative, because we didn't have control... 'cause we didn't have Wayne".

The director said he incorporated a set where everything was slightly off. The set was built with a converging ceiling, in order to appear smaller. The lead actress in the video was never fully shown. The Young Money star appears but then quickly disappears. The video closes with a memory of a lost friend.

== Chart performance ==
As a promotional single, "Miss Me" shot onto the Billboard Hot 100 at number 15 for its debut, making it his highest-charting U.S. debut off Thank Me Later. It then fell to number 76 in the next several weeks, but once it was released as an official single it rebounded to number 39. The single was certified platinum by the Recording Industry Association of America (RIAA) for sales of a million digital copies in the United States.

== Charts ==
=== Weekly charts ===
Chart (2010)	Peak position
Canada Hot 100 (Billboard)	73
US Billboard Hot 100	15
US Hot R&B/Hip-Hop Songs (Billboard)	3
US Hot Rap Songs (Billboard)	2
US Rhythmic Airplay (Billboard)	17

=== Year-end charts ===
Chart (2010)	Position
US Hot R&B/Hip-Hop Songs (Billboard)	24

== Certifications and sales ==
Region	Certification	Certified units/sales
United States (RIAA)	Platinum	1,000,000^{‡}
^{‡} Sales+streaming figures based on certification alone.
