= Over (Drake song) =

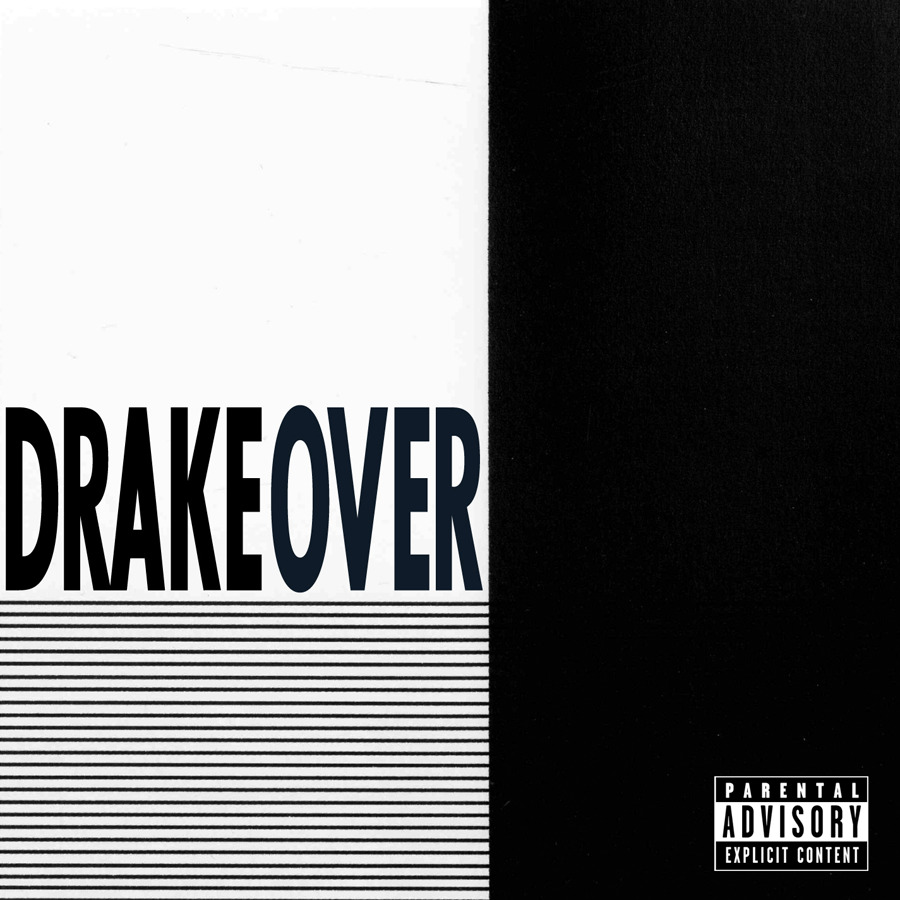

Single by Drake

from the album Thank Me Later
- Released: March 8, 2010
- Recorded: 2009
- Genre: Hip hop
- Length: 3:54
- Label: Young Money; Cash Money; Motown
- Songwriters: Aubrey Graham; Matthew Samuels; Nick Brongers; Noah Shebib
- Producers: Boi-1da; Al Khaaliq

Drake singles chronology
| "4 My Town (Play Ball)" (2009) | "Over" (2010) | "Find Your Love" (2010) |

Music video
- "Over" on YouTube

"Over" is the debut solo single by Canadian rapper Drake. The lead single from his debut album, Thank Me Later, it was written by Drake with Boi-1da, and produced by the latter and Al Khaaliq (Nick Brongers). The orchestral samples were composed and arranged by Brongers. The single was released for digital download on March 8, 2010. The song is midtempo hip-hop with an orchestral backdrop, whose lyrics concern an introduction to fame.

It peaked in the top twenty of the United States and Canada, becoming Drake's fourth consecutive top twenty hit in the U.S. It also charted within the top five on the U.S. R&B and rap charts, his fourth consecutive top five on those charts. The song also charted in the United Kingdom and its R&B chart. The song's accompanying music video features Drake reflecting on an experience, and the struggle between his old life and the new. Several artists have made a freestyle over the track, including Eminem, Trey Songz, and Diggy Simmons, among others. Drake performed the song a number of times, including at the 2010 MuchMusic Video Awards. The track received a nomination for Best Rap Solo Performance at the 53rd Grammy Awards. The song is also featured on the NBA 2K11 and The Hip Hop Dance Experience soundtracks.

== Background ==
"Shut It Down" was originally planned to be released as the first single from Thank Me Later in late 2009, but Drake ultimately chose "Over", a song produced by Boi-1da, producer of his previous singles "Best I Ever Had" and "Forever". Drake chose to premiere the song on his hometown Toronto's radio station Flow 93.5. Drake did a lot of work for the song and the album in Jamaica.

== Music and lyrics ==
"Over"
A 30-second sample of "Over" featuring the chorus, hook, and beginning of the verse by Drake.

The song "touches on Drake reaction to fame and stardom"; Drake told MTV News that the song was "definitely" a choice of his for releasing as a single, and that it was a song he did for himself. Brad Wete of Entertainment Weekly called the song "a prideful track about a guy who fought for notoriety, gained it, and now struggles with what comes with it: criticism, groupies, and the pressure of expected greatness". The song makes heavy use of an orchestral backdrop, while Drake delivers confident, aggressive raps in a paced fashion. Drake makes references to film critics Roger Ebert & Richard Roeper, as well as actress Jada Pinkett Smith and her 1996 film, Set It Off. According to Michael Craggg of MusicOMH, the song contains three hooks. Several lines in the second verse are a flip of hip-hop group Dead Prez's "Hip-Hop", from their 2000 debut, Let's Get Free. He also references Michael Jackson's iconic attire in his "Thriller" video, and commented, "He was young and had the world excited and anticipating his every move. That was my homage to him and the impact that he had on the world that I live in. It's also ... great for people to say. Especially, unfortunately what happened to him, just to honor him was great".

== Music video ==
=== Background ===
The video was shot on March 12, 2010, in Los Angeles, directed by Anthony Mandler. Mandler previously worked with Drake on the video for his collaboration with Mary J. Blige, "The One". It premiered on VEVO on April 12, 2010. In an exclusive with Rap-Up, Mandler said he was a big Drake fan, and that Drake told him "that nobody had really captured him" on video".

=== Synopsis and reception ===
Drake paying homage to Michael Jackson's attire in "Thriller" in the music video.

British singer Rita Ora plays Drake's distant love interest in the video. It begins with Drake dressed sitting in a room on a bed, reflecting on his new life. Several images including explosions and cityscapes are shown on him and on the wall before the performance begins. Drake is later shown throughout the video in front of a gray backdrop, as he seems to be thinking about two women in his visions, Ora, who seems to portray the good girl, and another woman, who remained yet to be seen fully, portrayed as dangerous as she dances provocatively in the background. Wete of Entertainment Weekly called the video "artistically contradictory", said scenes of Drake sitting "alone in his bedroom" are "pensive and rebellious", and called them "controlled chaos", but said that it worked in the video. Wete also said that "He chose not to go the cliche rap-video route and fill his four-minute flick with nearly naked women, Ciroc bottles, and Beamers", and that he stuck with "one leading lady".

== Remixes ==
Several artists have remixed or made a freestyle over the beat, including Eminem, B.o.B, Sean Kingston, Royce da 5'9", Trey Songz, Fat Joe, Teairra Marí, and Diggy Simmons. Simmons, the first to release a freestyle over the track, told Vibe, "With that freestyle, I heard the track, loved it, then got the instrumental from a friend of mine and just did it on the whim. It wasn't really anything I planned. I wasn't even ready for this to be a big thing because I've had tracks out before. I put my all into everything, but sometimes some tracks come out better than others. It got such a big buzz maybe because it came out the day after and people enjoyed it."

== Live performances ==
Drake performed the song at MTV's Spring Break 2010 in Acapulco, Mexico, and at the 2010 Juno Awards. He also performed the song at the 2010 MuchMusic Video Awards. "Over" was also performed alongside "BedRock" with Nicki Minaj on Jimmy Kimmel Live! on June 25, 2010. Drake also performed the song at the 2010 BET Awards on June 27, 2010, in a medley along with "Fireworks" and a remix of Young Jeezy's "Lose My Mind".

== Critical reception ==
Mariel Conception of Billboard said that the single lived up to its expectations, and that "Drake continues to prove he's worthy of the hype." She commented, "It definitely isn't over for Drake-this is only the beginning.". Chris Ryan of MTV News said the song sounded "very much a first single" and that Drake "is almost overwhelmed by the opportunity to officially go off". Ryan also said that "it sounds like he's pouring all of himself into every corner of the song". Ryan Dombal of Pitchfork Media said the song "does not back down" as the album's lead track, with "royal fanfare-- strings, horns, the works", which he called "an emperor's welcome".

Henry Adaso of About.com dismissed the song, giving it two out of five stars, not pleased with the chorus, and called the rhymes and metaphors "redundant" and "proposterous". While he called the lead single a "disappointment", he said that it raises expectations for his album, hoping that "he's saving the gems for his album" and also called the "distracting music" a pro of the song.

== Chart performance ==
The song debuted at number thirty-five on the US Billboard Hot 100, and eventually peaked at fourteen on the chart. While it peaked at number one on the Rap Songs chart, it charted at number two on the Hot R&B/Hip-Hop Songs. The single was certified triple platinum by the Recording Industry Association of America (RIAA) for sales of over three million digital copies in the United States.

In Drake's native Canada, the song debuted at fifty-six, later peaking at number seventeen on the chart. The song peaked at number fifty in the United Kingdom, and at eighteen on the UK R&B Chart. In Germany, the song peaked at ten on the German Black Chart.

== Credits and personnel ==
- Songwriting - Drake, Boi-1da, Nick Brongers, Noah "40" Shebib
- Production - Boi-1da, co-produced by Al Khaaliq
- Mixing - Noah "40" Shebib, assisted by Dale Dizzle Virgo and Tandra Jhagroo
- Engineering - Noah "40" Shebib
- Drum programming - Urban Entertainment
- Keys, Strings and Horns - Al-Khaaliq, Urban Entertainment additional by Noah "40" Shebib

== Charts ==
=== Weekly charts ===
| Chart (2010) | Peak position |
|---|---|
| Canadian Hot 100 | 17 |
| German Black Chart | 10 |
| UK Singles Chart | 50 |
| UK R&B Chart | 18 |
| US Billboard Hot 100 | 14 |
| US Hot R&B/Hip-Hop Songs | 2 |
| US Hot Rap Songs | 1 |

=== Year-end charts ===
| Chart (2010) | Position |
|---|---|
| Canadian Hot 100 | 91 |
| US Billboard Hot 100 | 60 |

== Certifications ==
| Region | Certification | Certified units/sales |
|---|---|---|
| Australia (ARIA) | Gold | 35,000^{‡} |
| United Kingdom (BPI) | Gold | 400,000^{‡} |
| United States (RIAA) | 3× Platinum | 3,000,000^{‡} |
^{‡} Sales+streaming figures based on certification alone.

== Release history ==
| Region | Date | Format |
|---|---|---|
| United States | March 8, 2010 | Digital download |
| United Kingdom | March 22, 2010 | Digital download (Clean) |
| United Kingdom | May 21, 2010 | Digital download (Explicit) |
