= Find Your Love =

Single by Drake

from the album Thank Me Later
- Released: May 5, 2010
- Recorded: 2009
- Genre: R&B
- Length: 3:29 (album version); 3:10 (radio edit)
- Label: Young Money; Cash Money; Universal Motown
- Songwriters: Aubrey Graham; Kanye West; Jeffrey Bhasker; Patrick Reynolds
- Producers: Kanye West; Jeff Bhasker; No I.D.

Drake singles chronology
"Over" (2010)	"Find Your Love" (2010)	"Miss Me" (2010)

Music video
- "Find Your Love" on YouTube

"Find Your Love" is a song by Canadian rapper Drake. It was written by Drake alongside Patrick Reynolds, Jeff Bhasker, and Kanye West, being produced by the latter two and No I.D. It serves as the second single from his debut album, Thank Me Later (2010), and was released to radio on April 28, 2010, and digital download on May 5, 2010. The song became a hit on June 17, 2010.

The midtempo song received mostly positive reviews from critics. It debuted in the top forty in the United States. The song's accompanying music video chronicles Drake's fateful encounter with a gang-affiliated woman.

== Background ==
"Find Your Love" was co-written and produced by American rapper Kanye West. It is his fourth collaboration with Drake after directing the video for "Best I Ever Had", co-appearing with Drake on Jamie Foxx's song "Digital Girl", and guest appearing on Drake's "Forever". When speaking to MTV News in 2009, Drake called West "the most influential person on his sound", stating,

"Before I ever got the chance to meet him, Kanye West shaped a lot of what I do, as far as music goes, We always, always, always took the time to listen to Kanye's music and appreciate it beyond. We searched the samples and find out where his inspiration came from, because he has one of the best ears in music, period. He knows how to recognize great music that's not his. He knows how to utilize great sounds and great music. So before I met him, I had the utmost respect for Kanye West. I'd even go as far as to say he's the most influential person, as far as a musician, that I'd ever had in my life."

Co-writer and frequent West collaborator Jeff Bhasker discussed the song's conception:

"I think No I.D had that drum beat and that's the classic, 'Jeff jump on the piano,' and Kanye started humming in my ear. We started coming up with a melody, I started crafting the music and we wrote that relatively quickly, within an hour."

"Find Your Love" was originally written for Rihanna, who collaborated with Drake on her song "What's My Name?", which was released later that year, to profound commercial success. In a later interview with MTV News, Drake said that he felt the song should have been performed by a woman, stating, "Find Your Love is an extremely vulnerable song. And it's actually a huge risk. It almost feels like the song should be performed by a woman. I'm just hoping that men really hear the song and they're honest with themselves. I know a lot of men feel that way." The song was posted on Drake's official blog on April 29, 2010, but was later removed due to bandwidth issues.

== Composition and critical reception ==
"Find Your Love" is a dancehall-leaning R&B song that contains a "traditional soulful R&B vibe" with "a Jamaican beat". The song received positive reviews, with critics commending Drake's attempt at moving into the singing lane, and comparing it to its producer, Kanye West's work on 808s & Heartbreak. The Star Phoenix said the song featured a beat that could be on 808s and Heartbreak and that Drake showed off his "versatility" and "smooth singing on this slow-jam", stating, "I better find your loving / I better find your heart," he sings (over and over and over) on the chorus to this bump-'n'-grind single." Ryan Brockington of the New York Post said the song consisted of "dripping double-drum beats, 80's filtered vocals and a catchy little chorus". Jayson Rodriguez of MTV News said that the song features "Drake in full crooner mode as he sings about saving his relationship: "I'm more than just an option," he sings over sparse drums and piano licks. "Refuse to be forgotten / I took a chance with my heart / And I feel it taking over / I better find your loving / I better find your heart." Andrew Martin of Prefix Magazine said that the beat sounded "right off 808s and Heartbreak, and that the track was "intriguing and slightly unexpected". Clinton Yates of The Washington Post complimented the song, but said that the song lacked Drake's lyrical talent. Find Your Love was named the eighth best song of 2010 by Time. The song was nominated for Record of the Year at the 2010 Soul Train Music Awards.

== Music video ==
The music video was shot with Anthony Mandler, director of the "Over" video in Kingston, Jamaica during the week of April 12, 2010, exclusively revealed to Rap-Up. Drake told MTV News, "We went to Kingston, We went to this 'hood. They call it the 'gully' side. It's bad out there, real bad. They had 'Young Money' sprayed on the gates, 'Drake and Wayne,' 'cause I came to shoot the video out there. I'm talking about you drive by people's homes, they had 'Drake,' 'Young Money,' 'Drake, Welcome Here,' 'Drake We Love You' — crazy sh--, man. It was so crazy. This dude was like, 'Original Weezy tha God! You tha boss! Weezy tha God!' It's crazy. They love us, 'cause we show love out there." The video was released on May 11, 2010, on Drake's blog and on MTV. In an interview with MTV News the video's director, Anthony Mandler said,

"Part of the objective of making this video was to do that same twist again, to give you something unexpected, not only tonality with the song but with the video thematically. It's kind of like the anti-love love story. It's really about crossing lines, what was said in the first scene. It's about really understanding what's right and what's wrong and it's really easy to lose that when you're the center of attention. He did it fearlessly, he did it without any sign of hesitation. He wanted to do something that went further with the song, that took the essence of the song but communicated it with imagery that made people think, rather than go up the middle and make an obvious R&B video."

The video features Jamaican reggae and dancehall singer Mavado as a gang leader, and a model, Maliah Michel, as the love interest. It begins with the phrase, "The worst thing about crossing a line is when you don't know, you already have." In the video, also set in Jamaica, Drake becomes infatuated with a woman who is pursuing him. The woman, portrayed by Michel happens to be already with a gang leader, Mavado. Although he is warned Drake refuses to be threatened and leave without attempting a relationship with Michel. Drake is given advice by a Jamaican sage, but ignores it and says that he has to see her one last time. He then travels to the "Gully Side" to see her. Several scenes are shown to imply things are going too far, including in a dancehall club and scenes of Drake and Michel, with her apparently wooing him in a room. Another scene has thugs watching as Drake and Michel leave a party to walk on the beach, and the men leave on motorcycles to report back to Mavado. However, when he sees her the last time, Drake, after reminiscing of his time together with Michel, is cornered by Mavado's gang while going to Michel's house. Michel lured him to her house to be caught by Mavado. The clip ends with Michel, seemingly with no regrets, being the one to shoot Drake as the clip ends with the noise of a gunshot.

Jamaica's minister of tourism, Edmund Bartlett, criticized the video, stating Drake and others should be mindful of how they characterize the island's culture. Barlett commented to the Gleaner, "We just have to say that care has to be taken by all, including our creative artists, in portraying images of our destination and people, Gun culture, while not unique to Jamaica, is not enhancing [the island's image]". Mavado's manager defended the video, stating, "The concept that they came up with, where did they come up with that? If Mavado did not do it, another Jamaican actor would have done it. There are a broad range of issues which need addressing if people from California want to portray a love story like this."

== Charts ==
=== Weekly charts ===
Chart (2010)	Peak position
Austria (Ö3 Austria Top 40)	68
Belgium (Ultratip Bubbling Under Flanders)	15
Belgium (Ultratip Bubbling Under Wallonia)	21
Canada Hot 100 (Billboard)	10
Czech Republic Airplay (ČNS IFPI)	32
German Black (Deutsche Trend)	1
Germany (GfK)	65
Netherlands (Dutch Top 40 Tipparade)	3
Netherlands (Single Top 100)	85
Scottish Singles Sales (Official Charts)	32
UK Singles (Official Charts)	24
UK Hip Hop/R&B (Official Charts)	11
US Billboard Hot 100	5
US Hot R&B/Hip-Hop Songs (Billboard)	3
US Pop Airplay (Billboard)	8
US Rhythmic Airplay (Billboard)	1

=== Year-end charts ===
Chart (2010)	Position
Canada (Canadian Hot 100)	42
Italy Airplay (EarOne)	44
UK Singles (Official Charts Company)	171
US Billboard Hot 100	32
US Hot R&B/Hip-Hop Songs (Billboard)	15
US Mainstream Top 40 (Billboard)	43
US Rhythmic (Billboard)	8

== Certifications ==
Region	Certification	Certified units/sales
Australia (ARIA)	Gold	35,000^{‡}
United Kingdom (BPI)	Gold	400,000^{‡}
United States (RIAA)	3× Platinum	3,000,000^{‡}
^{‡} Sales+streaming figures based on certification alone.

== Release history ==
Region	Date	Format
United States	May 4, 2010	Rhythmic airplay
United States	May 5, 2010	Digital download
United States	May 11, 2010	Urban and mainstream airplay
