= Thank Me Later =

Studio album by Drake
- Released: June 15, 2010
- Recorded: 2009–2010
- Studios: Avex (Honolulu); BLD&DSTRY (Toronto); Cherry Beach (Toronto); Metalworks (Toronto); Blast Off (New York City); Roc the Mic (New York City); Gee Jam (Portland, Jamaica); Glenwood (Los Angeles); The Hit Factory (Miami); The Setai Hotel (Miami); Lexington, Kentucky; New Orleans, Louisiana; NightBird (West Hollywood); Takeover (Houston); Triangle Sounds (Atlanta)
- Genres: Hip-hop; pop rap; R&B
- Length: 61:02
- Labels: Young Money; Cash Money; Universal Motown
- Producers: 40; Boi-1da; Francis and the Lights; Kanye West; Omen; Swizz Beatz; Timbaland; Tone Mason

Drake chronology
So Far Gone (2009)	Thank Me Later (2010)	Take Care (2011)

Singles from Thank Me Later
- 1. "Over" Released: March 8, 2010; 2. "Find Your Love" Released: May 5, 2010; 3. "Miss Me" Released: June 1, 2010; 4. "Fancy" Released: August 3, 2010

Thank Me Later is the debut studio album by the Canadian rapper Drake. It was released on June 15, 2010, by Young Money Entertainment, Cash Money Records, and Universal Motown Records. Production for the album took place at various recording studios during 2009 to 2010 and was mostly produced by longtime collaborators 40 and Boi-1da. It features contributions from Alicia Keys, Timbaland, Swizz Beatz, Nicki Minaj, Lil Wayne, The-Dream, and Kanye West, among others.

Thank Me Later has a languorous, ambient production that incorporates moody synthesizers, sparse beats, obscured keyboards, minor keys, and subtle arrangements. Thematically, the album focuses on Drake's introduction to fame and his romances over the course of confessional, club-oriented, and sexual songs. Drake's emotionally transparent, self-deprecating lyrics are delivered in both rapped and subtly sung verses, and explore feelings of doubt, insecurity, and heartbreak.

Following an anticipated release, Thank Me Later debuted at number one on the Billboard 200 with first week sales of 447,000 copies in the US, eventually selling 1.8 million copies there by August 2015. It also topped the Canadian Albums Chart and attained a platinum certification in Canada in its debut week. All four of the album's singles became top 40 hits on the Billboard Hot 100, with "Find Your Love" reaching number five. Reviews of Thank Me Later were generally positive, with critics applauding Drake's personal themes and drawing musical comparisons to the works of Kid Cudi and West, particularly the latter's 2008 album 808s & Heartbreak. It later ranked as one of 2010's best albums. The album received a nomination for Best Rap Album at the 53rd Annual Grammy Awards.

== Background ==
Released in February 2009, Drake's mixtape So Far Gone proceeded his series of early mixtapes and achieved unexpected critical and commercial success, earning him two Grammy Award-nominations and producing the hit single "Best I Ever Had". The single reappeared on his debut EP, which was released after a bidding competition among labels and his signing with Universal Motown Records amid support from high-profile hip hop artists such as Kanye West, Jay-Z, and Lil Wayne. Drake followed-up on So Far Gone's success with several guest appearances on other rappers' works, adding to the hype surrounding him at the time.

In an interview for Complex, Drake stated that his debut album will be "a solid hip hop album" and musically distinct from his So Far Gone mixtape, which received negative comparisons to Kanye West's 808s & Heartbreak (2008). He expressed a desire to work with André 3000, Kid Cudi, and Sade for the album. In an interview for MTV, Drake cited Nas and André 3000 as influences for parts of Thank Me Later, stating "Nas was somebody that I used to listen to his raps and never understood how he did it. I always wanted to understand how he painted those pictures and his bar structure. I went back and really studied Nas and André 3000 and then came back with this album". In comparing the album to his previous work, he stated "It's gonna be bigger, it's gonna sound happier. More victorious, 'cause that's where I'm at in my life". He told Entertainment Weekly that, "I didn't make this album for commercial purposes. A lot of the verses are extremely long. I just made it to share with people. I hope they can enjoy".

== Recording and production ==
Parts of the album were recorded and mixed at Cherry Beach Sound (control room pictured).

Drake resumed work on the album in October 2009, following an onstage injury from a July 2009 concert. Recording sessions for the album took place at several recording studios, including Metalworks Studios, BLD&DSTRY, and Cherry Beach Studios in Toronto, NightBird Recording Studios in West Hollywood, Gee Jam Studios in Portland, Jamaica, The Setai Hotel Recording Studio and The Hit Factory in Miami, Blast Off Studios and Rock the Mic in New York, Glenwood Studios in Los Angeles, Triangle Sounds Studios in Atlanta, Takeover Studios in Houston, and Avex Recording Studio in Honolulu. The track "Up All Night" was recorded on a bus "somewhere in Lexington", and "Unforgettable" was recorded on a bus "somewhere in New Orleans". The album was mixed at Tree Sound Studios, Blast Off Studios, Gee Jam Studios, Cherry Beach Studios, The Setai Hotel Recording Studio, Metalworks Studios, Stadium Red in New York, and Studio 306 in Toronto. Lil Wayne, Cortez Bryant, Gee Roberson, Ronald "Slim" Williams, Oliver El-Khatib, Noah "40" Shebib, Derrick "E.I." Lawrence, Jas Prince, and Bryan "Birdman" Williams served as executive producers for the album.

Producers 40 and Boi-1da handled most of the tracks' programming and instrumentation. Besides his Toronto-based producer team, Drake also collaborated with European producer Crada, who previously worked on Kid Cudi's 2009 debut album Man on the Moon: The End of Day. Drake told Entertainment Weekly that he collaborated with an indie pop band named Francis and the Lights. Kevin Rudolf also participated in the album's recording, contributing with keyboards on "Show Me a Good Time" and "Find Your Love". R&B singer Mary J. Blige contributed additional vocals to the track "Fancy". In March 2010, Drake confirmed that he had recorded a track with Eminem and Dr. Dre. In early November 2009, Lil Wayne released an official statement explaining that Thank Me Later had been completed, though Drake later commented that he was still working on the album. On April 26, 2010, Drake announced to a crowd during a show that he had finished recording and had turned in a final copy of the album.

== Music and lyrics ==
In a genre that demands boldness and bravado, Drake turns his first full-length release into an inward-looking, slow-moving, psychedelic psychodrama ... it plays like an off-kilter dream by a reluctant rap star.

— Greg Kot, Chicago Tribune

Thank Me Later has a languorous, ambient production and is characterized by subtle arrangements, obscured keyboards, skittering snare drums, and reverbed percussion. Lyrically, Thank Me Later has moody, introspective subject matter, and mainly centers around Drake's introduction to fame and his romances. The Toronto Star describes the content as "about the sorts of doubts, excesses, betrayals and creeping paranoid suspicions that arrive hand-in-hand with celebrity". Music journalist Greg Kot describes the album as "personal and eccentric, the journal of a flawed, self-doubting regular guy rather than a strutting icon-in-waiting".

The album's first-half generally discusses fame directly with confessional songs about unrequited love, money, and women, followed by club-oriented and sexual songs. Drake's lyrics explore feelings of doubt, insecurity, and heartbreak, while exhibiting both emotional and grammatical malapropisms. He raps in a nasal voice and sings subtly, with a flow generally in A-B-AB form. Music journalist Jody Rosen observes "emotionally transparent" rapping that eschews the "thuggy" style previously popular in hip hop, finding Drake's style to be "subtle and rueful rather than loud and lively".

Music writers liken Thank Me Later to Kanye West's 808s & Heartbreak. Nathan Rabin writes that, "musically, Drake favors warm washes of synthesizers that create a melancholy, fragile mood redolent of 808s & Heartbreak." Comparisons are also drawn to Man on the Moon: The End of Day by Kid Cudi, a protégé of West. By contrast, Joshua Ostroff of The Globe and Mail feels that Thank Me Later's "emotional navel-gazing lacks West's often-suffocating self-pity and offers a proper synthesis of rap and R&B." Jeff Weiss of the Los Angeles Times views that the album ignores West's celebratory side "in search of anthems for the easily alienated".

"The Resistance"
The guilt-ridden song exemplifies the album's "conflation of the glam-ridden and the everyday".

"Cece's Interlude"
Drake croons in couplets on the sentimental, effects-heavy track.

"Fireworks" references the divorce of Drake's parents and alludes to his brief fling with Rihanna. "Karaoke" features background keyboards that add to the song's 1980s musical influence, with lyrics about the difficulty of relationships. In "The Resistance", Drake worries about fame changing him, with lyrics veering from his ailing grandmother to a one-night stand that resulted in an abortion. "Over" incorporates an orchestral backdrop, and according to Michael Cragg of MusicOMH, contains three hooks. The artful song is about the elation and confusion that accompanies fame. "Show Me a Good Time" opens and closes with a squeaky yelling sound. On the song, Drake talks addresses hip hop listeners who find him inauthentic. "Up All Night" has menacing strings, and Drake boastfully rapping about his nightlife, while trading lines with Nicki Minaj. The club song "Fancy" has a predominant hook, looped samples, and backwards strings. It is an ode to women who spend hours primping in preparation for the nightlife. The song features vocals by producer Swizz Beatz and T.I., with additional harmonies by Mary J. Blige at the song's conclusion. "Shut It Down" is a progressive soul song, in the manner of a piano ballad and slow jam.

"Light Up" features loud synth drums and plaintive piano strings. The Jay-Z-collaboration is a critique on the hip hop industry, its detrimental effects, and the trappings of being an artist: "While all my closest friends out partyin'/ I'm just here makin' the music that they party to," while Jay-Z gives advice: "Drake, here's how they gonna come at you / with silly rap feuds, trying to distract you." Jay-Z expands on the album's overarching theme of self-doubt: "And since no good deed go unpunished / I'm not as cool with niggaz as I once was / I once was cool as the Fonz was / But these bright lights turned me to a monster." "Miss Me" has Lil Wayne rapping jokes, including a crude punch line about sucking "the brown" off his penis and subsequently groaning, "Ewwww, that's nasty." "Cece's Interlude" has a Prince-like LinnDrum and transparent lyrics addressing a girl: "I wish I / Wasn't famous / I wish I / Was still in school / So that I could have you in my dorm room / I would put it on you crazy." The pop song "Find Your Love" was produced by Kanye West and bears similarity to his 2008 song "Heartless".

== Marketing and sales ==
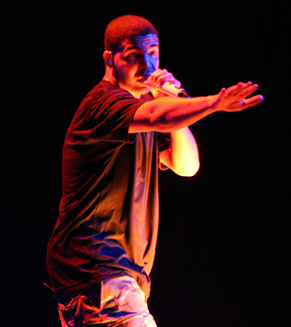
Drake performing at the Fox Theatre in Atlanta, 2010

Thank Me Later was one of the most anticipated hip hop releases of 2010. Universal Motown Records announced its release date as June 15, 2010, before it leaked on June 1 in its entirety. Drake responded on Twitter: "I gave away free music for years so we're good over here... just allow it to be the soundtrack to your summer and Enjoy! June 15th!" The album was released June 15, 2010, by Aspire Music Group, with Young Money Entertainment under a joint venture with Cash Money Records and distribution by Universal Motown. When Thank Me Later was released, it debuted at number one on the Billboard 200 in the United States and sold 447,000 copies in its first week. It also debuted at number one in Canada with first-week sales of 31,000 copies. By August 2015, the album has sold 1.8 million copies in the United States.

In promotion of Thank Me Later, Drake performed at the 9:30 Club in Washington, D.C., on June 13, 2010. On June 15, Drake made an in-store appearance at a Best Buy-outlet in New York City's Union Square in promotion of the album's release, interacting with fans and signing copies of the album. On the day of its release, Drake also made interviews for several radio stations through the phone. A planned free concert by Drake at South Street Seaport's Pier 17 that day was cancelled by concert organizers and authorities after unruly behavior within crowds and unsafe overcrowding. Following the cancellation, Drake appeared at Manhattan nightspot Amnesia for an album-release party sponsored by radio station Hot 97.

Four singles were released from the album—"Over" on March 8, 2010, "Find Your Love" on May 5, "Miss Me" on June 1, and "Fancy" on August 3. All four singles reached the top 40 of the Billboard Hot 100, including "Miss Me" at number 15 and "Over" at number 14. "Find Your Love" charted at number five on the Hot 100 and also reached number 10 in Canada. "Shut It Down" was originally planned for release as the first single in late 2009 and "Show Me a Good Time" was planned to be the fifth single, but both releases failed to materialize.

== Critical reception ==
Thank Me Later ratings
Aggregate scores
Source	Rating
AnyDecentMusic?	6.0/10
Metacritic	75/100
Review scores
Source	Rating
AllMusic	4/5 stars
The A.V. Club	B+
Entertainment Weekly	B
Los Angeles Times	2.5/4 stars
MSN Music (Expert Witness)	B+
NME	6/10
Pitchfork	8.4/10
Rolling Stone	3.5/5 stars
Spin	8/10
USA Today	3/4 stars

Thank Me Later was met with generally positive reviews. At Metacritic, which assigns a normalized rating out of 100 to reviews from professional critics, the album received an average score of 75, based on 26 reviews. Aggregator AnyDecentMusic? gave it 6.0 out of 10, based on their assessment of the critical consensus.

Tim Sendra of AllMusic complimented the album's "rich and nuanced production and Drake's thoughtful, playful, and intense lyrics", writing that his "willingness to be introspective and honest ... makes [him] unique and helps make Thank Me Later special." Pitchfork critic Ryan Dombal said "Drake vies for superstardom while embracing his non-drug-dealing, non-violent, non-dire history-- one that connects with most rap fans in a completely reasonable way." In The A.V. Club, Rabin wrote that "on his cohesive, bittersweet, assured debut, he proves himself worthy of the sometimes-blinding spotlight". Rosen, writing for Rolling Stone, found Drake to be "in total command of a style that would have been hard to imagine dominating hip-hop a few years ago". In the opinion of Ben Detrick from Spin, Thank Me Later had "dynamics like few other hip-hop albums before it", and while "Drake's personal anecdotes lack the bravado of bullet-wound boasts", they were "intimate and lyrically detailed enough to draw blood". Prefix critic Wilson McBee deemed it one of the few pop rap records "that comes close to being a classic".

Some reviewers were less impressed. Daniel Roberts of PopMatters said none of the songs are better than "Best I Ever Had" and believed Drake was suffering from an "identity crisis", finding the record "good at parts, but never great". Josuha Errett of Now felt Drake "complains about fame way too much" while calling him "humorless". In MSN Music, Robert Christgau deemed Drake "neither thug nor thug wannabe ... plenty talented, but pretty shallow and without much focus as a mack". He wrote of the record: "Pleasing and hookful though it be, [it] consistently bemoans the confusing emoluments and accoutrements of fame". Pete Cashmore from NME believed "it's those constant and predictable superstar interjections that prevent the album from standing out as much as it had potential to do." Slant Magazine's Jesse Cataldo viewed Drake's "insistent navel-gazing" as a flimsy "concept", but commended the album for "nail[ing] confused introspection in a genre famous for willful misrepresentation of self."

At the end of 2010, Thank Me Later appeared on several critics' top-ten lists of the year's best albums, including Time, who ranked it fifth best, and Rolling Stone, who named it the seventh best album of the year. At the 2010 Grammy Awards, "Best I Ever Had" was nominated for Best Rap Solo Performance and Best Rap Song. In 2013 and 2022, Rolling Stone included Thank Me Later in its list of the 100 Best Debut Albums of All Time.

== Track listing ==
Thank Me Later standard edition
No.	Title	Writer(s)	Producer(s)	Length
1.	"Fireworks" (featuring Alicia Keys)	Aubrey Graham; Alicia Cook; Noah Shebib; Matthew Samuels; Christian Kalla	40; Boi-1da^{[a]}; Crada^{[a]}	5:13
2.	"Karaoke"	Graham; Francis Starlite; Shebib	Francis and the Lights	3:48
3.	"The Resistance"	Graham; Shebib; Samuels; Oliver El-Khatib	40	3:45
4.	"Over"	Graham; Samuels; Nick Brongers; Shebib	Boi-1da; Al-Khaaliq^{[a]}	3:54
5.	"Show Me a Good Time"	Graham; Kanye West; Ernest Wilson; Jeff Bhasker	West; No I.D.^{[a]}; Bhasker^{[a]}	3:30
6.	"Up All Night" (featuring Nicki Minaj)	Graham; Onika Maraj; Samuels; Matthew Burnett	Boi-1da; Burnett^{[a]}	3:54
7.	"Fancy" (featuring T.I. and Swizz Beatz)	Graham; Clifford Harris; Kasseem Dean; Shebib; Samuels; Aubrey Johnson; Henry Zant	Swizz Beatz; 40^{[a]}	5:19
8.	"Shut It Down" (featuring The-Dream)	Graham; Terius Nash; Shebib; Sidney Brown	40; Omen	6:59
9.	"Unforgettable" (featuring Young Jeezy)	Graham; Jay Jenkins; Shebib; Samuels; Ronald Isley; Ernie Isley; Marvin Isley; O'Kelly Isley Jr.; Chris Jasper	40; Boi-1da	3:34
10.	"Light Up" (featuring Jay-Z)	Graham; Shawn Carter; Shebib; Anthony McIntyre	40; Tone Mason	4:34
11.	"Miss Me" (featuring Lil Wayne)	Graham; Dwayne Carter, Jr.; Samuels; Shebib; Doug Edwards; Dave Richardson	Boi-1da; 40	5:06
12.	"Cece's Interlude"	Graham; Shebib; Adrian Eccleston	40	2:34
13.	"Find Your Love"	Graham; West; Wilson; Bhasker; Patrick Reynolds	West; No I.D.^{[a]}; Bhasker^{[a]}	3:29
14.	"Thank Me Now"	Graham; Timothy Mosley	Timbaland	5:29

Japanese bonus tracks
No.	Title	Writer(s)	Producer(s)	Length
15.	"Best I Ever Had"	Graham; Samuels; Carter, Jr.; Danny Hamilton; Tommy Reynolds	Boi-1da	4:17
16.	"Uptown" (featuring Bun B and Lil Wayne)	Graham; Bernard Freeman; Carter, Jr.; Samuels; Jeremy McArthur; William Joel	Boi-1da; Arthur McArthur	6:21
17.	"Successful" (featuring Trey Songz and Lil Wayne)	Graham; Tremaine Neverson; Shebib; Carter, Jr.	40	5:51

UK bonus track
No.	Title	Writer(s)	Producer(s)	Length
16.	"9AM in Dallas"	Graham; Samuels; Burnett	Boi-1da	3:39

Notes

- ^{^[a]} signifies a co-producer

Sample credits

- "Fancy" contains elements and samples of "I Don't Want to Play Around", written by Aubrey Johnson and Henry Zant, published by Ace Spec Music (BMI).
- "Unforgettable" contains elements and excerpts from "At Your Best", performed by Aaliyah, written by Ronald Isley, Ernie Isley, Marvin Isley, O'Kelly Isley Jr., and Chris Jasper, published by EMI April Music Inc (ASCAP).
- "Miss Me" contains elements and excerpts from "Wild Flower", performed by Hank Crawford, written by Doug Edwards and Dave Richardson, published by Nettwerk Tunes (BMI).
- "Miss Me" contains an interpolation of "What's Hannenin'", performed by Soulja Boy.

== Personnel ==
Credits are adapted from the album's liner notes.

- Al-Khaaliq – producer, horns, keyboards, and strings (track 4)
- A-Trak – scratching (track 5)
- Jeff Bhasker – co-producer and keyboards (tracks 5, 13)
- Mary J. Blige – additional vocals (track 7)
- Boi-1da – producer (tracks 4, 6, 9, 11), co-producer (1), instrumentation (6, 11), drum programming (4, 9), additional keyboards (7), additional drum programming (1, 3)
- Cortez Bryant – executive producer
- Matthew Burnett – co-producer and strings (track 6)
- Michael "Banger" Cadahia – engineer (track 11)
- Noel Cadastre – engineer (tracks 5, 10), assistant engineer (1, 3, 6, 7, 9, 12), mixing assistant (6, 7, 13)
- Noel "Gadget" Campbell – mixing (tracks 8–11)
- Ariel Chobaz – engineer (track 6)
- Crada – co-producer (track 1)
- Drake – vocals (all tracks)
- The-Dream – vocals (track 8)
- Adrian "X" Eccleston – guitar (tracks 10–12)
- Oliver El-Khatib – art direction, executive producer
- Noah "40" Shebib – producer (tracks 1, 3, 8–12), co-producer (7), engineer (1–4, 6–14), mixing (1–7, 12, 13), instrumentation (1, 3, 12), keyboards (8–10), piano (10), additional programming (7), additional keyboards (2, 4, 7, 11), additional drum programming (8), executive producer
- Francis and the Lights – producer (track 2)
- Chris Gehringer – mastering
- Chris Godbey – mixing (track 14)
- Philip Golebiewski – artwork, photography
- Travis Harrington – assistant engineer (track 8)
- Ghazi Hourani – assistant engineer (track 14)
- Jay-Z – rap (track 10)
- Tandra "Lytes" Jhagroo – assistant engineer (track 2), mixing assistant (4)
- Gimel "Young Guru" Keaton – engineer (track 10)
- Alicia Keys – vocals (track 1)
- Anthony Kronfle – assistant engineer (tracks 1, 8, 10)
- Derrick "E.I." Lawrence – executive producer
- Lil Wayne – rap (track 11), executive producer
- Anthony Mandler – photography
- Jonathan Mannion – photography
- Mark "Darkie" Mayers – design
- Nicki Minaj – rap (track 6)
- Ann Mincieli – engineer and mixing (track 1)
- Marq "MoodyMan" Moody – assistant engineer (track 11)
- Greg Morrison – mixing assistant (tracks 8–11)
- No I.D. – co-producer and drum programming (tracks 5, 13)
- Yashar Oghabi – mixing assistant (track 2)
- Omen – producer and drum programming (track 8)
- Anthony Palman – assistant engineer (track 14)
- Keith Parry – mixing assistant (track 5)
- J. Prince – assistant engineer (track 14), executive producer
- Jas Prince – executive producer
- Kevin Randolf – keyboards (tracks 5, 13)
- Patrick "Plain Pat" Reynolds – drum programming (track 13)
- Gee Roberson – executive producer
- Miguel Scott – mixing assistant (tracks 2, 3, 6, 7, 12)
- Francis Farewell Starlite – instrumentation (track 2)
- David "Gordo" Strickland – mixing assistant (tracks 8–11)
- Swizz Beatz – vocals, producer, and instrumentation (track 7)
- T.I. – rap (track 7)
- Pat Thrall – engineer (track 8)
- Timbaland – producer and instrumentation (track 14)
- Tone Mason – producer and drum programming (track 10)
- Dale "Dizzle" Virgo – assistant engineer (track 2), mixing assistant (4)
- Kanye West – producer (tracks 5, 13)
- Bryan "Baby Birdman" Williams – executive producer
- Ronald "Slim Tha Don" Williams – executive producer
- Young Jeezy – rap (track 9)

== Charts ==
=== Weekly charts ===
Weekly chart performanc
Chart (2010)	Peak position
Australian Albums (ARIA)	81
Australian Urban Albums (ARIA)	6
Belgian Albums (Ultratop Flanders)	98
Canadian Albums (Billboard)	1
Dutch Albums (Album Top 100)	71
French Albums (SNEP)	117
German Albums (Offizielle Top 100)	34
Greek Albums (IFPI)	35
Irish Albums (IRMA)	32
Japanese Albums (Oricon)	61
New Zealand Albums (RMNZ)	35
Scottish Albums (Official Charts)	39
Swiss Albums (Schweizer Hitparade)	69
UK Albums (Official Charts)	15
UK R&B Albums (Official Charts)	1
US Billboard 200	1
US Top R&B/Hip-Hop Albums (Billboard)	1

=== Year-end charts ===
Year-end chart performance
Chart (2010)	Position
Canadian Albums (Billboard)	22
UK Albums (OCC)	145
US Billboard 200	16
US Top R&B/Hip-Hop Albums (Billboard)	5

Year-end chart performance
Chart (2011)	Position
US Billboard 200	91
US Top R&B/Hip-Hop Albums (Billboard)	26

Year-end chart performance
Chart (2025)	Position
US Billboard 200	172
US Top R&B/Hip-Hop Albums (Billboard)	84

=== Decade-end charts ===
Decade-end chart performance
Chart (2010–2019)	Position
US Billboard 200	131

== Certifications ==
Certifications
Region	Certification	Certified units/sales
Canada (Music Canada)	2× Platinum	160,000^{‡}
New Zealand (RMNZ)	Gold	7,500^{‡}
United Kingdom (BPI)	Platinum	300,000^{‡}
United States (RIAA)	4× Platinum	4,000,000^{‡}
^{‡} Sales+streaming figures based on certification alone.

== See also ==
- List of number-one albums of 2010 (Canada)
- List of Billboard 200 number-one albums of 2010
- List of UK R&B Albums Chart number ones of 2010
