= Cherry Beach Sound =

Canadian recording studio in Toronto since 1982

Coordinates: 43.64751°N 79.35162°W

Cherry Beach Sound is a recording studio in the Port Lands of Toronto, Ontario, Canada at 33 Villiers Street. It is located in Toronto's growing film district and is also a successful audio post-production house; TV, radio, and film commercials and or advertisements are often mixed in stereo or 5.1 surround sound.

== History ==
Cherry Beach Sound was founded in 1982 by Carman Guerrieri, who continues to operate the studio today. The name references Cherry Beach, a local beach. The building that houses Cherry Beach Sound is called The Munition Factory, as it served as a munitions factory in the early 20th century. Awarded with Mix's "Best of 2005", Cherry Beach is a popular destination for artists and continues to attract entertainers such as 50 Cent, who filmed his 2005 film Get Rich Or Die Tryin' at one of its studios. Kevin James and Adam Sandler recently visited the facility to work on their 2015 film Pixels. Other notable musicians who have recently recorded at Cherry Beach include Justin Bieber, Rihanna, Bruno Mars, Mark Ronson, John Legend, Drake, Keri Hilson, Wyclef Jean, Trey Songz, Saukrates, Usher, Timbaland, Ludacris The Jonas Brothers and American Idol finalist Jason Castro. In 2017, Cherry Beach Sound and head engineer Inaam Haq were awarded a Grammy Award for Record of the Year during the 58th Annual Grammy Awards for their work on Uptown Funk by Mark Ronson featuring Bruno Mars

=== Bus crash ===
In January 2006, at around 6:30 AM, Cherry Beach Sound was hit by a Gray Line bus which lodged 3 metres into the building and damaged support columns. To prevent the building from collapsing and to clean up fuel spill, structural engineers and a hazardous materials team were sent to handle the situation. There were no passengers on the bus and the driver escaped with minor injuries. The bus penetrated the building, destroying the front facade and damaging an interior main wall, requiring serious repair. The bus came to rest just inches from the studio's recently constructed Control Room A, fortunately no one was in the building at the time. Soon after, the building was completely repaired and carried on business as normal.

=== Renovation ===
In January 2005, a considerable amount was invested in the renovation and addition of a new state-of-the-art studio to Cherry Beach. The new studio, Control Room A, was designed by Martin Pilchner of renowned facility designers Pilchner-Schoustal International and includes four Genelec 1034B monitors, a Genelec 1034BC in the center-speaker position and a Genelec 7073A sub installed beneath the 56-input SSL6000 console in Cherry Beach's newly designed control room. Carman Guerrieri, owner of Cherry Beach states that the studio's new 5.1 array: "is capable of producing the fullrange of musical audio to the threshold of feeling at both the frequency extreme—19 Hz at the bottom end—and at the amplitude extreme—over 125 dB SPL per unit. It's quite remarkable."

== Studios/Equipment ==
Control Room B

Cherry Beach Sound has two control rooms, one of which houses a large Solid State Logic console, and the other of which uses a Digidesign D CONTROL Icon console. Both control rooms are wired to the studio's live floor, and were designed and acoustically treated by Martin Pilchner. Control Room A is a one of a kind studio as it is the only studio in Canada with soffit-mounted Genelec monitors and 5.1 surround sound capability. The website of Pilchner-Schoustal International states: "A notable feature of the design is the extremely large front window which engages the control room to the studio. Four separate layers of laminated glass take up over 6 feet of depth and run over 21 feet long including two 30 degree miters per layer. The window also splays upward toward the studio space, and as such incorporated an enormous amount of glass." Cherry Beach Sound utilizes the latest modern technologies such as Source-Connect, an array of Genelec monitors, a 56-channel SSL console, Neve and Manley pre-amps and compressors, a Yamaha C7 Grand piano, and a large lot of mics including the Neumann U 87, Neumann U 89, AKG C 414 EB, Sennheiser MD 421, and many more.

Control Room A

== The Munitions Factory ==
The building that contains Cherry Beach Sound, The Munitions Factory, houses several other companies such as Volume 11 Studios, offering services such as rental of rehearsal spaces. The warehouse section of The Munitions Factory is used for storage, filming/photoshoots and construction of sets. The facility presently offers three video suites, eleven rehearsal rooms, a repair shop and a rental service for film and television production. The warehouse, originally built in 1911 has high ceilings that date back to its history as a munitions factory. The high ceilings were designed to allow explosions to rise high before hitting the ceiling and being forced to expand horizontally. This reduced the risk of injury in the event of munitions-related accidents. Today, the high ceilings make the warehouse a popular space for film shoots, large band rehearsals, and other events.

== Artists who have recorded at Cherry Beach Sound ==
- Justin Bieber
- Bruno Mars
- Mark Ronson
- Desiigner
- Lewis Hamilton
- John Legend
- Fabolous
- Boi-1da
- Rihanna
- Usher
- The Jonas Brothers
- Randy Jackson
- Danny Fernandes
- Ashley MacIsaac
- 50 Cent
- Drake
- Timbaland
- Wyclef Jean
- The Clutch
- Keri Hilson
- Ludacris
- DJ Premier
- Onyx
- Brooke White
- Silverstein
- Jordan Knight
- K-OS
- Trey Songz
- Colin James
- Rush
- Garth Brooks
- K'Naan
- Divine Brown
- Shawn Desman
- Sean Jones
- The Doodlebops
- Sean Garrett
- Jann Arden
- Richard Bell
- Keshia Chanté
- Tom Cochrane
- Econoline Crush
- Dexter Simmons
- I Mother Earth
- Montell Jordan
- Leahy
- Ashley MacIsaac
- John McDermott
- Loreena McKennitt
- Kim Mitchell
- Moist
- Kardinal Offishall
- The Rascalz w/ Beat Nutz, Choclair, & Barrington Levy
- Saukrates
- Kim Stockwood
- Tea Party
- Richard Underhill
- David Usher
- Zeds Dead
