= Fancy (Drake song) =

Single by Drake featuring T.I. and Swizz Beatz

from the album Thank Me Later
- A-side: "Best I Ever Had"
- Released: August 3, 2010 (US)
- Recorded: 2010
- Genre: Hip-hop
- Length: 5:19 (album version); 4:08 (radio edit)
- Label: Aspire; Young Money; Cash Money; Motown
- Songwriters: Aubrey Graham; Clifford Harris; Kasseem Dean; Noah Shebib; Matthew Samuels; Mary Blige; Henry Zant; Aubrey Johnson
- Producers: Swizz Beatz; 40

Drake singles chronology
| "Miss Me" (2010) | "Fancy" (2010) | "Right Above It" (2010) |

T.I. singles chronology
| "Make Up Bag" (2009) | "Fancy" (2010) | "Get Back Up" (2010) |

Swizz Beatz singles chronology
| "On to the Next One" (2009) | "Fancy" (2010) | "Gucci Time" (2010) |

"Fancy" is a song by Canadian rapper Drake from his debut album, Thank Me Later. The song features vocals from American rappers T.I. and Swizz Beatz, the latter of whom also co-produced the track alongside Noah "40" Shebib. The song was released to US radio stations on August 3, 2010, as the album's fourth official single, however promotion of the track ended earlier than expected due to Drake's uncertainty towards the song's planned music video and promotion.

The original version that had leaked features the chorus sung by Young Jeezy and T.I., while Young Jeezy and T.I. rap the first verse and the first three are rapped by Drake. It was intended to be on Mary J. Blige's album Stronger with Each Tear, but missed the deadline and was later given to Drake in 2008. Blige's vocals were kept on Drake's version as a backing vocal, though formally uncredited.

The track received a nomination for Best Rap Performance By A Duo Or Group at the 53rd Annual Grammy Awards.

== Music video ==
A music video was filmed for the song on July 16, 2010. It was directed by Anthony Mandler. The video, however, was never released. In late September 2010, Drake told MTV that the reason why the video had not yet premiered is because he was debating whether to reshoot the video for "Fancy" or commission a clip for his next single, "Show Me a Good Time", he stated: "We shot 'Fancy,' and to be honest with you, it was done and I watched it and I just had a way better idea, and that's why the video hasn't come out yet. And to follow up 'Find Your Love' and 'Miss Me,' I really wanted to do something different, conceptually, and so I had this amazing idea and now I'm debating whether I should reshoot it or go straight to Show Me a Good Time".

== Live performances ==
Drake and Swizz Beatz performed the song at the MTV Video Music Awards in Los Angeles, California, on September 12, 2010. Mary J. Blige performed alongside them in place of T.I., who was unable to attend; she sang a verse from the original leaked version, in addition to the chorus. On New Year's Eve 2011 on ABC, Drake performed a new version of his "Fancy" track on Dick Clark's New Year's Rockin’ Eve With Ryan Seacrest. The record still has Swizz Beatz. The new verse was ultimately used on "Over My Dead Body", the opening track from his sophomore effort Take Care.

== Remix ==
Following the performance at the MTV Video Music Awards, the song was re-purposed as a remix using one of the verses and additional ad-libs from Blige's original version in place of T.I.'s verse. This version also features part of the first verse of the original Ace Spectrum song preceding the first chorus, as well as some minor alterations to the music in the bridge.

== Chart performance ==
"Fancy" debuted the US Billboard Hot 100 at number 99, the week following the album's release, due to it gaining strong digital sales. The song eventually peaked at number 25 on the chart. It reached its peak at four on the US Hot R&B/Hip-Hop Songs chart and one on the US Hot Rap Songs chart. The single was certified platinum by the Recording Industry Association of America (RIAA) for sales of over a million digital copies in the United States.

== Charts ==
=== Weekly charts ===
| Chart (2010) | Peak position |
|---|---|
| Canada Hot 100 (Billboard) | 54 |
| US Billboard Hot 100 | 25 |
| US Hot R&B/Hip-Hop Songs (Billboard) | 4 |
| US Hot Rap Songs (Billboard) | 1 |
| US Rhythmic Airplay (Billboard) | 11 |

== Certifications ==
| Region | Certification | Certified units/sales |
|---|---|---|
| United States (RIAA) | Platinum | 1,000,000^{‡} |
^{‡} Sales+streaming figures based on certification alone.
