= Club Paradise Tour =

2012 concert tour by Drake

- Tour by Drake
- Location: North America • Europe
- Associated album: Take Care
- Start date: February 14, 2012
- End date: June 17, 2012
- Legs: 3
- No. of shows: 65
- Box office: $42.6 million ($59.74 million in 2025 dollars)

Drake concert chronology
- Away from Home Tour (2010); Club Paradise Tour (2012); Would You Like a Tour? (2013–15)

The Club Paradise Tour was the second headlining tour by the Canadian rapper Drake. The tour came following the release of Drake's second studio album, Take Care. The tour's name spins off from the 2011 song "Club Paradise", a promotional single released ahead of the release of Take Care, which, in turn, borrowed its name from a strip club in Toronto. An official poster for the tour was released along with the announcement of the venture, showing Drake in the same room as is on the album cover, expressing the despondent conflicting stance about growing wealth and fame prevalent in the album.

The tour featured Kendrick Lamar, J. Cole, A$AP Rocky, and more as opening acts for the majority of the dates throughout the tour, with various acts being added as the tour expanded beyond North America. Due to the large demand and tickets selling out in minutes in multiple locations, extra tour dates were added to the itinerary, which included a second leg across the United States. The tour became a commercial success, grossing $42 million in the tour's duration. It was the highest-grossing hip-hop tour of 2012, according to Pollstar's annual year end tour chart.

== Background ==
Drake would announce the tour in October 2011, releasing dates in December, announcing that the "Club Paradise Tour" was set to feature in over college amphitheaters and multi-purpose arenas across the United States and Canada. This was seen as a shock move by Drake, due to the mainstream exposure and commercial success he had experienced following the releases of his two studio albums. Drake would later confirm in an interview with MTV that the labels had wanted him to embark on a stadium tour, which he rejected. He would comment, stating "I fought for this tour, I fought really hard for this tour because, of course, they want me to go get the big bucks, go into the stadiums and cash out. But I was just like, 'I really made this album for the same people that supported me since day one' [so I can't sell out]".

== Opening acts ==
- Kendrick Lamar (North America—Leg 1, Europe—Leg 1, select dates)
- A$AP Rocky (North America—Leg 1, Europe—Leg 1, select dates)
- J. Cole (North America—Leg 2)
- Waka Flocka Flame (North America—Leg 2)
- Meek Mill (North America—Leg 2)
- 2 Chainz (North America—Leg 2)
- French Montana (North America—Leg 2)
- Chief Keef (North America—Leg 2)
- Illy Da King (North America—Leg 2)
- Lual Allstar (North America—Leg 2)
- Rita Ora (United Kingdom, selected dates)
- Tinie Tempah (Europe)
- Labrinth (France, United Kingdom, selected dates)

== Setlist ==
1. "Lord Knows"
2. "Under Ground Kings"
3. "I'm On One"
4. "Over"
5. "Crew Love" (in some venues)
6. "The Zone"
7. "She Will"
8. "Shot For Me"
9. "We'll Be Fine"
10. "Forever"
11. "Marvins Room"
12. "Take Care"
13. "Cameras"
14. "Uptown"
15. "Miss Me"
16. Medley: "Look What You've Done" / "Fancy" / "Make Me Proud"
17. "Practice"
18. "HYFR (Hell Ya Fucking Right)"

Encore

1. "The Motto"
2. "Headlines"

Notes

- Drake performed "Crew Love" in lieu of "The Zone" at the show in Los Angeles, California, as well as performing "I'm Goin' In", "Up All Night", "Round of Applause", "Ima Boss" and "Can't Get Enough".
- Waka Flocka Flame would bring out Wale at the show in Cincinnati, Ohio, to perform "No Hands".
- Drake would bring out Rick Ross at the show in Houston, Texas, to perform Ima Boss and Stay Schemin' with Meek Mill.

== Tour dates ==
Date	City	Country	Venue
North America
February 14, 2012	Coral Gables	United States	BankUnited Center
February 15, 2012	Gainesville	United States	O'Connell Center
February 17, 2012	Nashville	United States	Bridgestone Arena
February 18, 2012	Columbus	United States	Value City Arena
February 21, 2012	Columbia	United States	Colonial Life Arena
February 22, 2012	Lexington	United States	Rupp Arena
February 24, 2012	Tallahassee	United States	Tucker Civic Center
February 25, 2012	New Orleans	United States	Lakefront Arena
February 27, 2012	Austin	United States	Frank Erwin Center
February 28, 2012	Oklahoma City	United States	Chesapeake Energy Arena
March 1, 2012	Kansas City	United States	Sprint Center
March 2, 2012	Arlington	United States	College Park Center
March 4, 2012	Tucson	United States	Tucson Arena
March 5, 2012	Los Angeles	United States	Galen Center
March 7, 2012	Davis	United States	The Pavilion at ARC
March 8, 2012	Fresno	United States	Save Mart Center
March 10, 2012	San Jose	United States	Event Center Arena
March 11, 2012	San Diego	United States	Viejas Arena
Europe
March 24, 2012	Dublin	Ireland	The O_{2}
March 26, 2012	London	England	The O_{2} Arena
March 27, 2012	London	England	The O_{2} Arena
March 29, 2012	Sheffield	England	Motorpoint Arena Sheffield
March 30, 2012	Cardiff	Wales	Motorpoint Arena
April 1, 2012	Manchester	England	Manchester Arena
April 2, 2012	Glasgow	Scotland	Scottish Exhibition and Conference Centre
April 5, 2012	Paris	France	Palais Omnisports de Paris-Bercy
April 7, 2012	Brussels	Belgium	Forest National
April 8, 2012	Amsterdam	Netherlands	Heineken Music Hall
April 10, 2012	Frankfurt	Germany	Jahrhunderthalle
April 12, 2012	Berlin	Germany	Max-Schmeling-Halle
April 13, 2012	Copenhagen	Denmark	Valby-Hallen
April 15, 2012	Stockholm	Sweden	Ericsson Globe
April 16, 2012	Oslo	Norway	Oslo Spektrum
April 19, 2012	Birmingham	England	LG Arena
April 20, 2012	Birmingham	England	LG Arena
April 22, 2012	Liverpool	England	Echo Arena Liverpool
April 23, 2012	Newcastle	England	Metro Radio Arena
April 25, 2012	Nottingham	England	Capital FM Arena Nottingham
North America
May 7, 2012	Concord	United States	Sleep Train Pavilion
May 8, 2012	Irvine	United States	Verizon Wireless Amphitheatre
May 10, 2012	Phoenix	United States	Ashley Furniture HomeStore Pavilion
May 11, 2012	Las Vegas	United States	MGM Grand Garden Arena
May 13, 2012	Greenwood Village	United States	Comfort Dental Amphitheatre
May 14, 2012	Albuquerque	United States	The Pavilion
May 16, 2012	Dallas	United States	Gexa Energy Pavilion
May 17, 2012	Houston	United States	Toyota Center
May 19, 2012	Charlotte	United States	Verizon Wireless Amphitheatre
May 20, 2012	Atlanta	United States	Aaron's Amphitheatre at Lakewood
May 22, 2012	Raleigh	United States	Time Warner Cable Music Pavilion
May 23, 2012	Virginia Beach	United States	Farm Bureau Live
May 25, 2012	Washington, D.C.	United States	Verizon Center
May 26, 2012	Burgettstown	United States	First Niagara Pavilion
May 28, 2012	Cuyahoga Falls	United States	Blossom Music Center
May 30, 2012	Clarkston	United States	DTE Energy Music Theatre
June 1, 2012	Noblesville	United States	Klipsch Music Center
June 2, 2012	Tinley Park	United States	First Midwest Bank Amphitheatre
June 5, 2012	Memphis	United States	FedExForum
June 6, 2012	Cincinnati	United States	Riverbend Music Center
June 8, 2012	Darien Center	United States	Darien Lake Performing Arts Center
June 9, 2012	Camden	United States	Susquehanna Bank Center
June 11, 2012	Hartford	United States	Comcast Theatre
June 12, 2012	Holmdel Township	United States	PNC Bank Arts Center
June 14, 2012	Saratoga Springs	United States	Saratoga Performing Arts Center
June 16, 2012	Wantagh	United States	Nikon at Jones Beach Theater
June 17, 2012	Mansfield	United States	Comcast Center

=== Box office score data ===
Venue	City	Tickets sold / available	Gross revenue
Bridgestone Arena	Nashville	12,248 / 12,248 (100%)	$824,189
Frank Erwin Center	Austin	11,299 / 11,669 (97%)	$757,645
Save Mart Center	Fresno	11,890 / 11,890 (100%)	$753,738
The O_{2}	Dublin	11,433 / 11,433 (100%)	$611,911
The O_{2} Arena	London	34,575 / 35,000 (99%)	$2,128,570
Manchester Arena	Manchester	15,907 / 16,132 (99%)	$891,304
Verizon Center	Washington, D.C.	11,147 / 12,448 (89%)	$1,099,613
TOTAL		108,499 / 110,820 (98%)	$7,066,970
