= Trust Issues =

2019 song by Drake

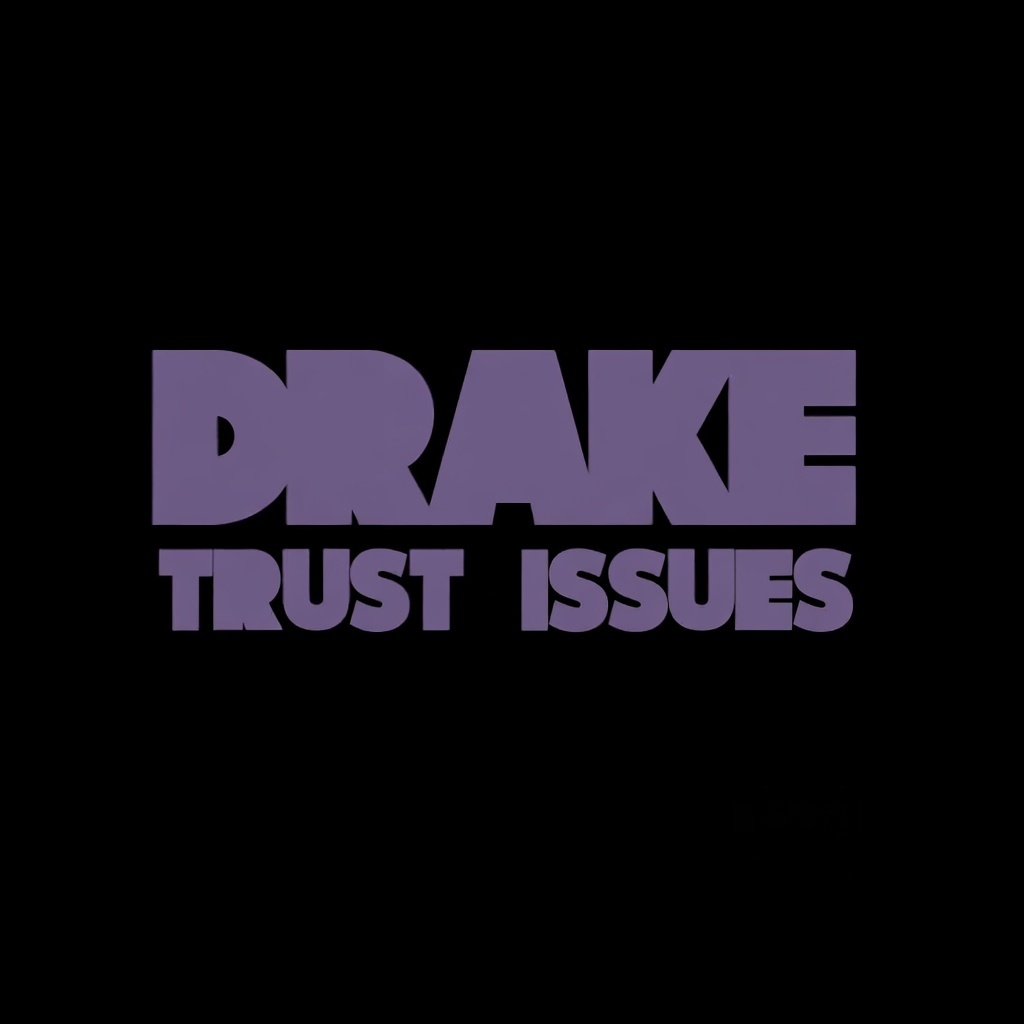

Song by Drake
- Released: June 21, 2011
- Genre: R&B
- Length: 4:41
- Label: OVO; Harlem King (Note: In the United Kingdom.)
- Songwriters: Aubrey Graham; William Roberts; Dwayne Michael Carter, Jr.; N. Cobey; DJ Khaled; Tyler Williams; Nikhil Seetharam; Noah Shebib
- Producers: T-Minus; 40

Alternative cover
- Original 2011 OVO blog cover

Audio video
- "Trust Issues" on YouTube

"Trust Issues" is a song by Canadian rapper Drake. It was originally released as a free download on June 21, 2011, and released in the UK on June 8, 2014, via Harlem King Entertainment. "Trust Issues" was initially unavailable on major music streaming services until its re-release on his compilation album Care Package, which was released on August 2, 2019, by OVO Sound. It is a slow, melodic, atmospheric R&B track about the complexities of trust, loyalty, and betrayal in relationships under the pressure of fame. "Trust Issues" served as a promotional single to his 2011 studio album Take Care.

Written by Drake, Rick Ross, Lil Wayne, N. Cobey, DJ Khaled, T-Minus, Nikhil Seetharam, and Noah "40" Shebib, the track also explores themes of coping through substances such as purple lean. Production was handled by 40 and T-Minus. "Trust Issues" also incorporates elements from DJ Khaled's "I'm on One", which features Drake.

Commercially, upon re-release, "Trust Issues" peaked at number 58 on the US Billboard Hot 100, and number 63 on the Canadian Hot 100. Certifications include platinum in Australia and New Zealand, and silver in the United Kingdom. The song spawned remixes and covers, including a remix by the Weeknd on June 25, 2011, and a profanity-free cover by Justin Bieber on August 28, 2011, which was met by praise from Drake. August Alsina's version appeared on his untitled debut mixtape. It received positive critical reception from Rolling Stone, labeling it an "acclaimed track".

== Background and release ==
"Trust Issues" was one of four tracks that were released in 2011 to promote Drake's studio album Take Care, alongside "Dreams Money Can Buy", "Club Paradise", and "Free Spirit". These standalone songs were shared via his October's Very Own (OVO) blog and were initially unavailable on major music streaming services. Written by Drake along with Lil Wayne, DJ Khaled, Nikhil Seetharam, Rick Ross, Noah "40" Shebib, T-Minus, and N. Cobey, and produced by 40, and T-Minus, "Trust Issues" was originally released as a free download on June 21, 2011. In an interview with Entertainment Weekly, Drake explained that "Trust Issues" and "Dreams Money Can Buy" were scrapped off from the album in favor of "Headlines" and "Marvins Room", as he planned to reserve them for a special "birthday edition".

According to the British Phonographic Industry (BPI), "Trust Issues" received a separate UK release credit on June 8, 2014, via Harlem King Entertainment. On August 1, 2019, Drake announced the compilation album Care Package via Instagram. "Trust Issues" was officially re-released as part of the compilation through OVO Sound on August 2, 2019, shortly before his annual OVO Fest in Toronto.

== Music and lyrics ==
"Trust Issues"
An 18-second sample from Drake's "Trust Issues", showcasing the slow, atmospheric interpolation and reworking of his own hook from DJ Khaled's "I'm on One".

"Trust Issues" runs 4 minutes and 41 seconds in length. It is the fourth track on Care Package mixed and mastered by 40. The song features a slow, down-tempo interpolation of Drake's own hook from "I'm on One".

"Trust Issues" is an R&B song that examines the suffering and ambiguity arising from the complexities of interpersonal relationships. Chris Coplan of Consequence described it as "one part confessional, one part ode to drank", highlighting its spacey, the Weeknd-influenced R&B vibe. Writing for The Edge, George Townsend called it a "slow, melodic, atmospheric track" on which Drake's vocal likeness to the Weeknd is unmistakable. The song opens with an interpolation from DJ Khaled's "I'm on One", where Drake sings "All I care about is money and the city that I'm from", echoing his own hook from the earlier track. Lyrically, Drake narrates how fame has led loved ones to turn against him through betrayal, driving him to numb his pain with liquor, specifically purple lean (codeine-promethazine syrup). He repeatedly questions the loyalty of those around him, expressing paranoia with lines like "I don't trust these bitches, they might catch me slipping", blending vulnerability, cynicism, and self-awareness in a confessional style.

== Reception and performance ==
"Trust Issues" generally received positive reviews from music critics. Writing for Pitchfork, Tom Breihan described it as "slow and depressive", noting how it tweaks Drake's chorus from "I'm on One" into a heavier vibe. In a 2019 piece, Corban Goble of Pitchfork highlighted it positively, calling it "perhaps the most meta moment on an extremely meta release" and stating that the best songs on the compilation "stand up with Drake's best music", for casting a shadow on the excess implied in "I'm on One". Scott Shetier of PopCrush noted its "nice vibe" but felt it was "more of the same" compared to contemporaries like "Marvins Room", and less impressive since it built on the pre-existing DJ Khaled track. In a 2019 piece, Rolling Stone called it an "acclaimed track" from that era.

In the United States, "Trust Issues" debuted and peaked at number 58 on the Billboard Hot 100 (chart dated August 17, 2019). It also peaked at number 22 on the Hot R&B/Hip-Hop Songs chart, and number 16 on the Rolling Stone Top 100 charts. In Drake's native Canada, the song peaked at number 63 on the Canadian Hot 100. In the United Kingdom, it peaked at number 35 on the UK R&B Chart, and number 90 on the UK Streaming Chart. "Trust Issues" has been certified silver by the British Phonographic Industry (BPI) in the United Kingdom, and platinum by the Australian Recording Industry Association (ARIA), and platinum by Recorded Music NZ.

== Other versions ==
Four days after Drake released "Trust Issues" on his blog, a remix by Canadian singer the Weeknd was posted on the same blog on June 25, 2011. The Weeknd performed his version in 2011 during his set at the OVO Fest. On June 29, 2011, a mashup by Gizzle blending Drake's original version with the Weeknd's remix was posted on the OVO blog. Later that year, on August 28, 2011, Canadian singer Justin Bieber released his cover version of the song, intentionally omitting the profanity since he was 17 years old at the time. Drake praised Bieber's version, calling it "crazy". American singer August Alsina recorded a cover version of "Trust Issues" for his untitled debut mixtape, with an official video uploaded on September 28, 2011.

== Personnel ==
Credits are adapted from the liner notes of Care Package.

- Aubrey Drake Graham – vocals, songwriter
- Adrian Eccleston – guitar
- William Roberts – songwriter
- Dwayne Michael Carter, Jr. – songwriter
- N. Cobey – songwriter
- DJ Khaled – songwriter
- Tyler Williams – songwriter
- Nikhil Seetharam – songwriter
- Noah Shebib – producer, songwriter
- T-Minus – producer

== Charts ==
Chart performance for "Trust Issues"
Chart (2019)	Peak position
Canada Hot 100 (Billboard)	63
UK Audio Streaming (Official Charts)	90
UK Hip Hop/R&B (Official Charts)	35
US Billboard Hot 100	58
US Hot R&B/Hip-Hop Songs (Billboard)	22
US Rolling Stone Top 100	16

== Certifications ==
Certifications for "Trust Issues"
Region	Certification	Certified units/sales
Australia (ARIA)	Platinum	70,000^{‡}
New Zealand (RMNZ)	Platinum	30,000^{‡}
United Kingdom (BPI)	Silver	200,000^{‡}
^{‡} Sales+streaming figures based on certification alone.

== Release history ==
Release history for "Trust Issues"
Region	Date	Format	Label	Ref.
Various	June 21, 2011 (Note: Released as promotional single.)	Free download	OVO	
United Kingdom	June 8, 2014	Digital download; streaming	Harlem King	
Various	August 2, 2019	Digital download; streaming	OVO	
