= Shot for Me =

2011 song by Drake

Song by Drake

from the album Take Care
- Released: November 15, 2011
- Recorded: 2011
- Studio: Sterling Road (Toronto, Ontario)
- Genre: Alternative R&B
- Length: 3:44
- Label: Young Money; Cash Money; Republic
- Songwriters: Aubrey Graham; Noah Shebib; Abel Tesfaye; Rainer Millar Blanchaer
- Producer: Noah "40" Shebib

Audio video
- "Shot for Me" on YouTube

"Shot for Me" is a song by Canadian rapper Drake from his second studio album, Take Care (2011).

== Composition ==
Drake's own "Headlines" is sampled in "Shot for Me", both from the same album. The song also samples "Anything" by American R&B vocal group SWV.

== Critical reception ==
Billboard's Damien Scott praised the song, writing that "Drake glides through those bars with the same breathy falsetto that helped propel a bunch of his early hits. It's a jarring juxtaposition but it works beautifully. It also makes the actual rap verse that follows feel more tender and honest". Billboard also listed "Shot for Me" as the fifth-best R&B song from Drake.

In a negative review, Martenzie Johnson of Andscape criticised the song's lyrics, saying "Shot for Me" is "Drake at his worst, going beyond the behaviors of the paternalistic and disapproving ex".

== Legacy ==
New Zealand singer Lorde covered the song during a performance at Toronto in 2018. Lorde's cover of "Shot for Me" was well-received upon her performance of the song. Kristin Corry of Vice stated "The cover is pretty good and she definitely gives her Lorde spin on it, making it dark and breathy". Australian rapper The Kid Laroi released a cover of "Shot for Me" in 2021, as part of his Spotify Singles session. The Kid Laroi said in a statement: "I chose Drake because he's my favourite artist. 'Shot for Me' is one of my favourite songs of his off of one of my favourite projects and that made it really easy for me to do". Canadian singer Tate McRae sung "Shot for Me" during a soundcheck before a Toronto concert in 2025.

== Credits and personnel ==
The credits for "Shot for Me" are adapted from the liner notes of Take Care.

Recording

- Recorded at: Sterling Road Studios in Toronto, Ontario.

Personnel

- Drake – songwriting, vocals
- Noah "40" Shebib – songwriting, record producer, recording, instruments
- Rainer Millar Blanchaer – songwriting
- Abel Makkonen Tesfaye – songwriting
- Noel Cadastre – assistant engineering
- Travis Sewchan – assistant engineering
- Noel "Gadget" Campbell – mixing
- Chris Gehringer – mastering

Samples

- Contains elements of "Anything", as written and performed by SWV.

== Charts ==
"Shot for Me" made an appearance at number 100 on the Billboard Hot 100 for the chart week of December 3, 2011. The song later debuted on the Bubbling Under R&B/Hip-Hop Singles chart the next year, peaking at number two.

Weekly chart performance for "Shot for Me"
Chart (2011–2012)	Peak position
US Billboard Hot 100	100
US Bubbling Under R&B/Hip-Hop Singles (Billboard)	2

== Certifications ==
Certifications for "Shot for Me"
Region	Certification	Certified units/sales
New Zealand (RMNZ)	Gold	15,000^{‡}
United Kingdom (BPI)	Silver	200,000^{‡}
United States (RIAA)	Platinum	1,000,000^{‡}
^{‡} Sales+streaming figures based on certification alone.
