= We'll Be Fine =

Song by Drake featuring Birdman

from the album Take Care
- Recorded: 2011
- Genre: Hip hop
- Length: 4:08
- Label: Young Money; Cash Money; Republic
- Songwriters: Aubrey Graham; Bryan Williams; Tyler Williams; Noah Shebib; Anthony Palman
- Producers: T-Minus; 40

"We'll Be Fine" is a song by Canadian recording artist Drake featuring American rapper Birdman from his second studio album Take Care (2011). It was to serve as the seventh single from the album, but its full release was cancelled, as was the official release of its music video, despite the trailer being released on January 15, 2012. The full video leaked the following year.

== Music video ==
A music video was filmed for the track by filmmaker Mikael Columbu. The video didn't come out as the director and Drake planned and so the visuals were scrapped. The video and post were later deleted from Columbu's Vimeo channel and Drake's fan site. A 30-second trailer later appeared online, however. On December 7, 2013, the video leaked online with different music playing on Columbu's website.

== Chart performance ==
After Take Care was released in the United States on November 15, 2011, "We'll Be Fine" managed to chart in the Top 100 based on digital sales alone.

Chart (2012)	Peak position
US Billboard Hot 100	89
