= Take Care (song) =

2012 single by Drake

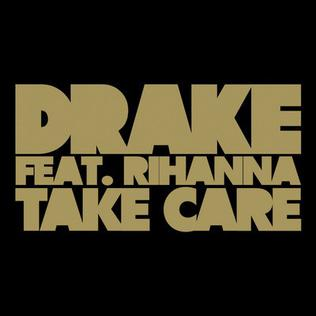

Single by Drake featuring Rihanna

from the album Take Care
- Released: January 17, 2012
- Recorded: 2011
- Studio: Metalworks Studios (Ontario, Canada)
- Genre: R&B; pop; club
- Length: 4:37
- Label: Aspire; Young Money; Cash Money; Republic
- Songwriters: Aubrey Graham; Jamie Smith; Noah Shebib; Anthony Palman; Benjamin Peay
- Producers: Jamie xx; 40

Drake singles chronology
"The Motto" (2011)	"Take Care" (2012)	"Stay Schemin'" (2012)

Rihanna singles chronology
"Talk That Talk" (2012)	"Take Care" (2012)	"Princess of China" (2012)

Music video
- "Take Care" on YouTube

"Take Care" is the title track from Canadian rapper Drake's second studio album of the same name. The song features guest vocals from Barbadian singer Rihanna. The song heavily samples Jamie xx's remix of Gil Scott-Heron's version of "I'll Take Care of You", written by Brook Benton. "Take Care" was released as the fifth single from the album on January 17, 2012. It is a club song about a couple in a relationship acknowledging they have been hurt in their past, but will look after one another.

"Take Care" peaked at number seven on the US Billboard Hot 100, while also reaching the top ten in Australia, Denmark, Israel, New Zealand, and the United Kingdom. It further peaked at numbers one and eight on the US Rhythmic and Mainstream Top 40 charts respectively. It is certified seven-times Platinum in the US and Australia. The song's accompanying music video, directed by Yoann Lemoine, depicts simplistic art including Drake and Rihanna's characters in an intimate relationship, with other scenes featuring animals such as a bull, black-throated magpie-jay and tropical fish, and various outdoor landscapes. The video portrays the ups and downs of a relationship with poaching and wildfires. Critics praised the video for its simple and minimalistic theme.

== Recording and composition ==
"Take Care" was written by Drake (credited as Aubrey Graham), Noah Shebib, Anthony Palman and James Smith, better known as Jamie xx. Production of the song was handled by Jamie xx and Shebib under his production name Noah "40" Shebib. It was recorded by Shebib and Ruben Riveara at Metalworks Studios, Ontario, Canada. The engineer was Noel Cadastre, and was assisted by Greg Morrison. It was mixed by Noel "Gadget" Campbell at Studio 206, Ontario, Canada. All instrumentation was provided for by Jamie xx, with exception of the guitar, which was provided by Romy Madley Croft – Jamie xx's fellow band member from the xx; drum programming was completed by Shebib. Background vocals were performed by Gil Scott-Heron. "Take Care" contains a sample of Brook Benton's song "I'll Take Care of You". Permission and license was granted by XL Recordings. Rihanna appears on the track as a featured artist courtesy of the Island Def Jam Music Group.

"Take Care"

"Take Care" is a club song that samples Jamie xx's 2011 remix of Gil Scott-Heron's cover song "I'll Take Care of You", originally recorded by Bobby Bland in 1959. The production of Drake's song was helmed by 40, reworking Jamie xx's remix. Additionally, Drake makes reference to Lesley Gore's 1963 number one single, "It's My Party" by re-working the lyrics, "It's my birthday, I'll get high if I want to, can't deny that I want you, but I'll lie if I have to." The song features guest vocals from Rihanna, marking the second collaboration of the pair, the first being Rihanna's number one single "What's My Name?" from her fifth studio album, Loud (2010), on which Drake was featured. The song is written in the key of C minor. The vocal range in the song spans one and a half octaves, from the lower note of C_{4} to the higher note of F_{5}, between Drake, Rihanna, and the original sample of Scott-Heron.

== Music video ==
=== Background ===
"They seemed to be super close, and that's what I wanted for the video. They fit together pretty well, so it was just easy.

— Director, Yoann Lemoine speaking of Drake and Rihanna.

A music video for "Take Care" was first brought to light in late December 2011. Following the release of the videos of Drake's previous videos for "Marvins Room" and "Headlines", Drake told MTV News that fans could expect visuals for "Take Care" saying, "It's a project where I think visuals are called for. So we're working on definitely the 'Take Care' video, which we're trying to get shot soon." The music video was later filmed in February 2012, over three days. Director, Yoann Lemoine called the shoot "very minimal" and "mellow". He further revealed, "There's a lot of space in the video, and I wanted the visuals to pay tribute to that. When I listened to the track, I was seeing a landscape, involving animals and massive landscapes. I won't say too much, but it's very surprising that there are very few elements in it. It's very simple but there's this big sense of emptiness in it. It's not narrative at all, and it involves animals." Photos of the video were released to the internet on March 12, 2012, showing a grayscaled Drake and Rihanna consoling as well as close ups of both artists looking emotional. The video was initially set to premiere on March 23, 2012, but was delayed due to editing purposes. Drake spoke of the delay and further commented on the video, saying:

"It had to go through a process – I shot it with a director who's incredible and we were just very specific about it. It's a big record and a lot of footage. It's [a] very artistic very abstract video – something that I wasn't used to. I'm usually used to a very straight forward concept so I'm really excited for people to see it because it's actually just something beautiful to look at. There's actually for once no story necessarily as far as there being a narrative like 'What's My Name?' or 'We Found Love' where there's stories. This is just beautiful imagery."

Drake announced that the video would be released either on March 28 or March 29, 2012. However, yet again, it did not premiere on any of those dates. The video eventually later premiered on April 6, 2012 on MTV and OVO, and was uploaded to Drake's official Vevo account on April 23. The video was released simultaneously with Drake's following single, "HYFR (Hell Ya Fucking Right)".

=== Synopsis ===
Drake explained the concept of the video in an interview, saying: "It's all basically the ups and downs of a relationship but represented in icebergs and fire and animals and just pulsating movement and then you've got me and Rihanna very intimate." This is shown first with a bull alone, a black-throated magpie-jay flying through the air, a tropical fish, and a peacefully-presented landscape with snow-covered mountains, all presented calm and relaxed. However, arrows are later shot at the bull to represent poaching, while fire, to represent global warming and wildfire, destroys the outside landscape. The bird and fish are also shown to be frightened, moving abruptly. The video could also be perceived as global warming or the effect of human mistreatment, destroying the beauty of nature on its own. The video features a shot of a figure mid-air (Drake himself), with ash falling around him while another scene features a tribal dancer completing a back flip through the air, among other moves. Rihanna wears a simple tatty cardigan whilst Drake is seen in a T-shirt, to present simplicity. Throughout the video, the pair are seen alone in some scenes, while in others they embrace each other by hugging, and with Drake kissing Rihanna on the forehead towards the end. The video concludes with a shot of smoke from the wildfire slowly dying out.

=== Reception ===
Following the release of the "Take Care" video, critics praised it, lauding its simplicity. James Montgomery of MTV praised the video saying, "On Friday, Drake finally premiered his long-in-the-works 'Take Care' clip. And yes, it was worth the wait. Full of massively icy landscapes, achingly tense slow-motion footage, artfully framed animals and, uh, Rihanna, it is basically Drake personified. Morose and masterful, slow-burning and incredibly sexual (even when it's not supposed to be), it exudes both an incredible level of restraint and an over-the-top amount of pomp. It is very serious, very cold, very pained. Nothing much really happens, but at its conclusion, you feel like you've been through an awful lot (maybe a journey through the mind of Damien Hirst?). None of his contemporaries — not even the ever-obtuse Kanye [West] – make videos like this, mostly because no one else can get away with it." He also titled the clip as "Frozen Planet". Becky Bain of Idolator also gave praise to the video and its simplicity, stating the video "floats through eerie and beautiful imagery" and concluded, "Even if you're not exactly sure what's going on, it's a deeply moving clip." David Greenwald of Billboard commented, "While the minimalist video focuses on Drake and Rihanna singing and embracing, it's full of luxurious slow-motion photography of a number of animals and landscapes, include a fish, a bird and a dusty buffalo."

== Cover versions and remixes ==
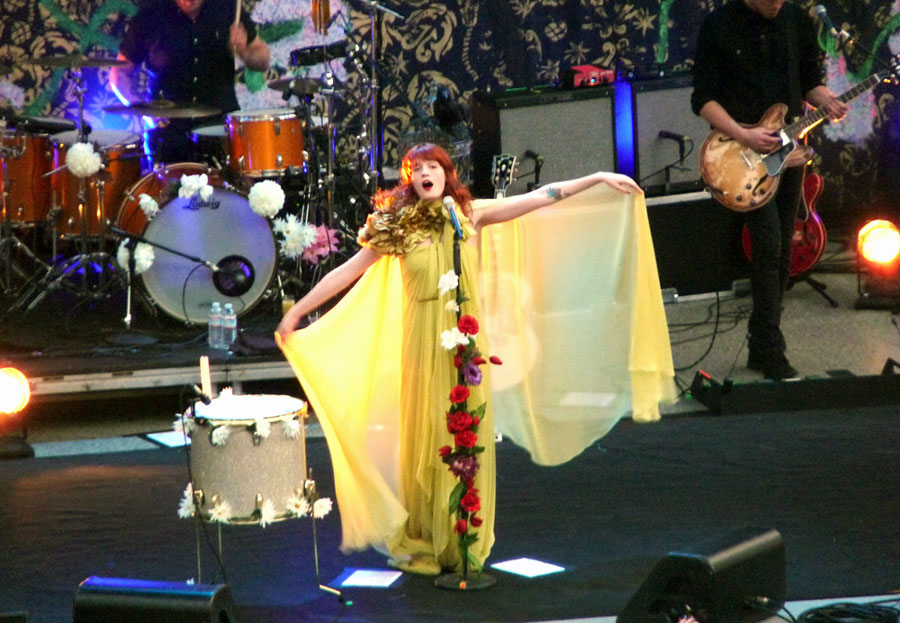
British indie rock band Florence and the Machine covered "Take Care" at BBC Radio 1's Live Lounge.

British indie rock band Florence and the Machine covered the song on November 25, 2011 during BBC Radio 1's Live Lounge. Before performing the song, lead singer Florence Welch announced: "This is pretty exciting because this is a song by one of my, well two of my, well three of my absolute favorite artists." Amy Lee of The Huffington Post wrote: "Florence sounds natural on the soulful, mournful track, with an added layer of epic provided by the band. In fact, 'Take Care' almost sounds more like a Florence and the Machine track than a Drake one." David Greenwald of Billboard described the cover as an "impassioned chamber-rock take." Describing their cover as "stunning", James Montgomery of MTV News wrote: "Backed by a stirring string section, Florence + the Machine's version of the song isn't as dark and knotty as Drake's original; instead, it's ethereal and downright doleful, starting slow and sleepy but building to a towering crescendo, with Welch lamenting that she's 'loved and lost' while drums pound, keyboards pulse and the strings trill." Montgomery also commented that "It's the kind of aching cover that leaves you wishing the two could actually collaborate on a record." The recording was eventually released in digital form as part of the iTunes "Ceremonials" deluxe edition on July 31, 2012, and subsequently released in physical form on an Australian Special 2CD edition of the Ceremonials album released on November 26, 2012; the band played the song at their headlining appearance at Bestival on September 7, 2012, the only time they have played this song live.

On August 1, 2012, American singer Leon Thomas III released his debut mixtape Metro Hearts. The mixtape includes a cover of "Take Care" featuring Thomas' then Victorious co-star Ariana Grande.

Reggaeton artists De la Ghetto and Jenny la Sexy Voz covered and remixed the song in Spanish and was released through Chosen Few Emerald Entertainment, Inc. entitled Si Me Dejaras (English: If You Let Me). Mashup artist wait what (of the xx fame) remixed the track to replace Rihanna's vocals with the original Gil Scott-Heron vocals in the chorus, paired with Drake's verses. The resulting track was posted across hundreds of blogs and received generally favorable reviews, being called "seamless" and definitely worth a listen".

== Critical reception ==
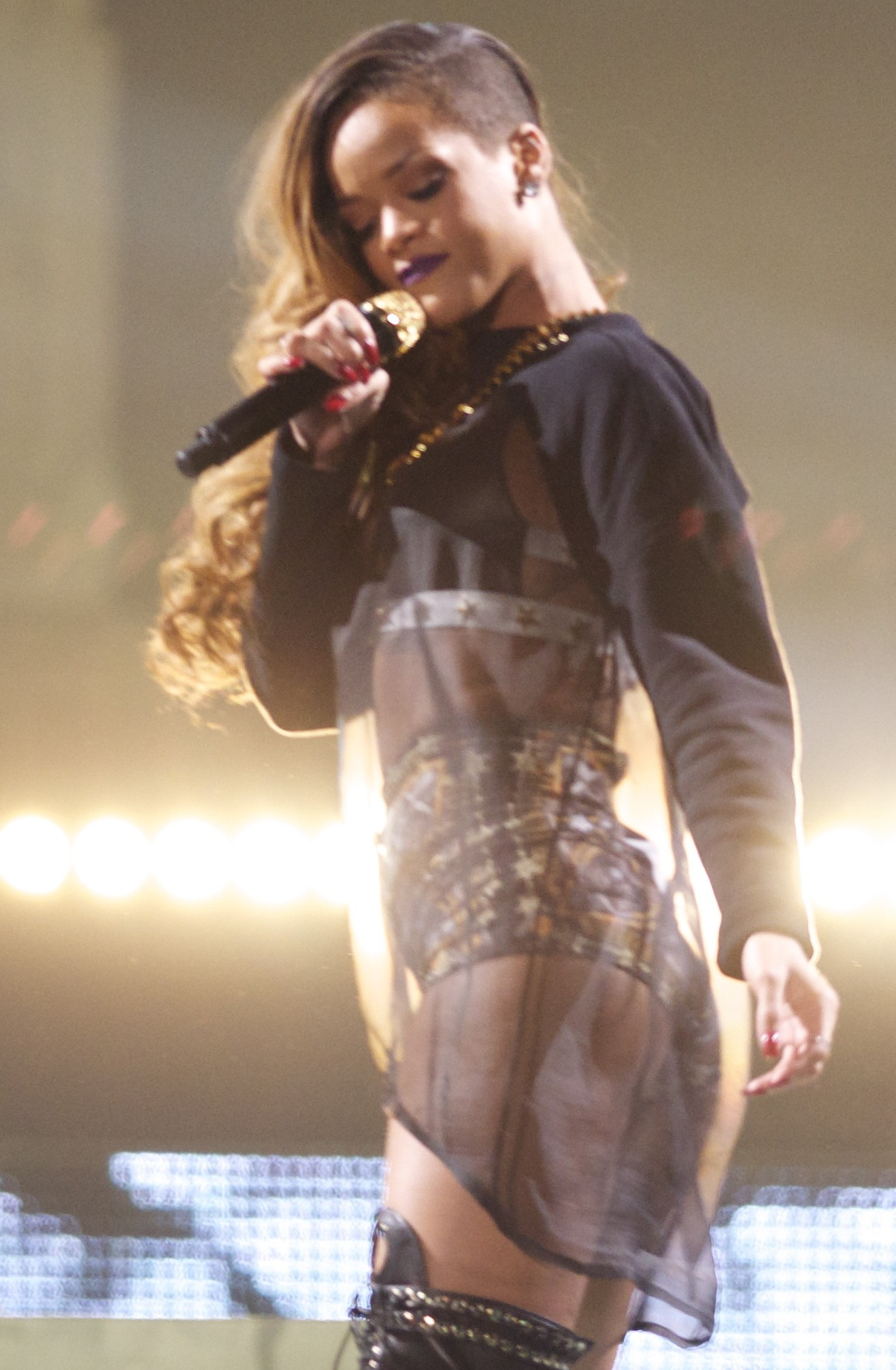
The song features guest vocals from Barbadian recording artist Rihanna. The pair previously collaborated on Rihanna's number one single, "What's My Name?" (2010).

The song has received universal acclaim from music critics. Rob Markman of MTV praised the track and described the song saying, "The Jamie xx-produced 'Take Care', with its pounding bass drum and sparse piano melody, tells the story of two lovers ready to leave behind their sketchy pasts in favor of a fruitful relationship together. Drake and Rih's real-life fling (one the rapper addressed on 2010's "Fireworks") only helps to enhance the song's appeal. Standing as both an endearing duet and a club banger, it's the danceable, Gil-Scott Heron-sampling house build toward the end of the song that truly makes it a standout." David Amidon of PopMatters praised the collaboration between Drake and Rihanna as well as Rihanna's vocal performance with regard to the lyrical content, writing "Rihanna [delivers] a vocal far, far prettier than one would ever expect from her lips that essentially forgives Drake and promises him friendship for life."

Tim Sendra of AllMusic also commended Rihanna's vocal performance, calling it "typically great" and continued to write that "Take Care" is the "most unique" song on the album. Glenn Gamboa of Newsday labelled the song as "gorgeous", writing that Rihanna's lifts the depressive mood which is present on the majority of Drake's songs. Gamboa also compared the song to Rihanna's "We Found Love", the lead single from her 2011 album Talk That Talk, writing that it is a "sweet counterpart".

Greg Kot of the Chicago Tribune was critical of the song, as well as Rihanna's inclusion, writing "Even with serial-songstress Rihanna on "Take Care" (is it possible to release a pop-leaning album anymore without a Rihanna cameo?), the tone is muted, loaded with reverb and beats that occasionally drop out completely." The song was featured on MTV's must-hear pop songs list along with songs by Cher Lloyd and the Wanted in 2011. MTV described the song as "gorgeous" and "devastating".

In 2021, it was ranked at number 267 on Rolling Stone's 500 Greatest Songs of All Time.

== Chart performance ==
"Take Care" was released to US rhythmic contemporary radio on January 17, 2012, serving as the official fifth single from Drake's second studio album of the same name. On February 21, it was also sent to the contemporary hit radio in the country. "Take Care" made its chart debut on the Australian Singles Chart on December 4, 2011, at number 45, following the album's release. The song managed to remain towards the bottom of the chart until the single's release, when it rose into the top ten to number nine on February 19, 2012. It has spent 24 total weeks on the chart since its first appearance. It has been certified seven-times platinum by the Australian Recording Industry Association (ARIA), for sales of over 490,000 copies. In New Zealand, "Take Care" debuted on the New Zealand Singles Chart on April 30, 2012, at number 21, following the single's release. The following week, it rose into the top ten to number seven, marking a new peak.

Upon the release of the album Take Care, the title track managed to immediately debut within the top ten of the US Billboard Hot 100, at number nine, with respectable sales of over 162,000 digital copies. With this, it became Rihanna's 21st and Drake's ninth top ten single in the United States. The strong sales of the song prompted "Take Care" to debut at number four on the US Digital Songs chart. The song also peaked at number eight on the Mainstream Top 40 chart and at number 26 on the Hot R&B/Hip Hop Songs chart in the country. On September 25, 2019, the single was certified quintuple platinum by the Recording Industry Association of America (RIAA) for sales exceeding 5 million copies in the United States. The song has additionally reached the top twenty of the Canadian Hot 100 at number 15.

The song also entered the UK Singles Chart at number 12, following the album's release. The following week, it reached the top ten at number nine, marking Drake's first top ten as a solo artist and second overall after "What's My Name?", coincidentally a Rihanna song featuring Drake. In the same week, it rose from its debut of number five the previous week, to its eventual peak of number three on the UK Hip Hop and R&B Singles Chart. It remained on the charts for 27 consecutive weeks. The song has also achieved moderate success in other European countries including in Denmark, reaching number eight, Scotland at 14, and Ireland at number 18.

== Credits and personnel ==
Credits adapted from the liner notes of Take Care.

Recording locations

- Recording – Metalworks Studios, Ontario, Canada.
- Mixing – Studio 206, Ontario, Canada.

Sample

- Contains elements from the composition "I'll Take Care of You", written by Brook Benton under Unichappel Music Inc (BMI).

Personnel

- Songwriting – Aubrey Graham, Noah Shebib, Anthony Palman and James Smith
- Production – Jamie xx and Noah "40" Shebib
- Vocal recording – Noah "40" Shebib and Ruben Riveara
- Engineer – Noel Cadastre
- Assistant engineer – Greg Morrison
- Mixing – Noel "Gadget" Campbell
- Instrumentation – Jamie xx
- Guitar – Noah "40" Shebib, Romy Madley Croft
- Featured artist – Rihanna, courtesy of Def Jam Recordings.

Video credits

- Yoann Lemoine ― direction
- Oualid Mouaness ― production
- Charles Marie Anthonioz & Coleen Haynes ― executive producers
- Kasper Tuxen ― direction of photography
- David Lanzenberg ― direction of photography (Pick up shoot)
- Charles Infante ― art direction
- Jarrett Fijal ― editional

== Charts ==
=== Weekly charts ===
Weekly chart performance for "Take Care"
Chart (2011–2012)	Peak position
Australia (ARIA)	9
Belgium (Ultratop 50 Flanders)	36
Belgium (Ultratip Bubbling Under Wallonia)	16
Canada Hot 100 (Billboard)	15
Czech Republic Airplay (ČNS IFPI)	58
Denmark (Tracklisten)	8
Euro Digital Song Sales (Billboard)	10
Euro Digital Tracks (Billboard) Explicit version	9
France (SNEP)	26
Ireland (IRMA)	18
Israel International Airplay (Media Forest)	6
New Zealand (Recorded Music NZ)	7
Scottish Singles Sales (Official Charts)	14
Sweden (Sverigetopplistan)	49
Switzerland (Schweizer Hitparade)	50
UK Singles (Official Charts)	9
UK Hip Hop/R&B (Official Charts)	3
US Billboard Hot 100	7
US Dance Airplay (Billboard)	11
US Hot R&B/Hip-Hop Songs (Billboard)	26
US Pop Airplay (Billboard)	8
US Rhythmic Airplay (Billboard)	1

=== Year-end charts ===
Year-end chart performance for "Take Care"
Chart (2011)	Position
UK Singles (Official Charts)	134

Chart (2012)	Position
Australia (ARIA)	66
Australia Hip-Hop/R&B (ARIA)	21
Canada Hot 100 (Billboard)	36
France (SNEP)	114
Sweden (Sverigetopplistan)	99
UK Singles (Official Charts)	67
US Billboard Hot 100	23
US Dance/Mix Show Airplay (Billboard)	38
US Hot R&B/Hip-Hop Songs (Billboard)	55
US Pop Airplay (Billboard)	43
US Rhythmic Airplay (Billboard)	2

== Certifications ==
Certifications for "Take Care"
Region	Certification	Certified units/sales
Australia (ARIA)	7× Platinum	490,000^{‡}
Canada (Music Canada)	2× Platinum	160,000^{*}
Denmark (IFPI Danmark)	Gold	15,000^{^}
Germany (BVMI)	Gold	150,000^{‡}
New Zealand (RMNZ)	3× Platinum	90,000^{‡}
United Kingdom (BPI)	3× Platinum	1,800,000^{‡}
United States (RIAA)	7× Platinum	7,000,000^{‡}
^{*} Sales figures based on certification alone.^{^} Shipments figures based on certification alone.^{‡} Sales+streaming figures based on certification alone.

== Release history ==
"Take Care" release history
Region	Date	Format	Labels	Ref.
United States	January 17, 2012	Rhythmic contemporary radio	Young Money; Cash Money; Republic	
United States	February 14, 2012	Urban contemporary radio	Young Money; Cash Money; Republic	
United States	February 21, 2012	Contemporary hit radio	Young Money; Cash Money; Republic	
