= Take Care =

Studio album by Drake
- Released: November 15, 2011
- Recorded: 2010–2011
- Genres: Hip-hop; R&B; pop; alternative R&B
- Length: 80:18
- Labels: Aspire; Young Money; Cash Money; Republic
- Producers: 40; Boi-1da; Chase N. Cashe; Illangelo; Jamie xx; Just Blaze; The Weeknd; T-Minus; Doc McKinney; Supa Dups

Drake chronology
Thank Me Later (2010)	Take Care (2011)	Nothing Was the Same (2013)

Singles from Take Care
- 1. "Marvins Room" Released: June 28, 2011; 2. "Headlines" Released: August 9, 2011; 3. "Make Me Proud" Released: October 16, 2011; 4. "The Motto" Released: November 29, 2011; 5. "Take Care" Released: January 17, 2012; 6. "HYFR (Hell Ya Fucking Right)" Released: April 24, 2012; 7. "Crew Love" Released: July 30, 2012

Take Care is the second studio album by the Canadian rapper Drake. It was released on November 15, 2011, by Young Money Entertainment, Cash Money Records and Republic Records. The album features guest appearances from The Weeknd, Rihanna, Kendrick Lamar, Birdman, Nicki Minaj, Rick Ross, Stevie Wonder, Lil Wayne, and André 3000. In addition to primary production from Drake and 40, further contributors include T-Minus, Chantal Kreviazuk, Boi-1da, Illangelo, Jamie xx, Supa Dups, Just Blaze, Chase N. Cashe, and Doc McKinney.

Prior to Take Care, Drake released Thank Me Later, which experienced positive critical success, but left him feeling disjointed about the album's musical content. Expressing a desire to reunite with 40, his long-time producer who featured in parts on Thank Me Later, the duo worked extensively on the new album once recording sessions began in 2010. Drake's vocals on the album feature emotional crooning, alto vocals, a guttural cadence, a melodic flow, and a larger emphasis on singing than on Thank Me Later. In comparison to his debut album, Drake revealed that the album is called Take Care because "I get to take my time this go-round [rather than rush]".

The album also expands on the low-tempo, sensuous, and dark sonic aesthetic of Thank Me Later. It incorporates several elements that have come to define Drake's sound, including minimalist R&B influences, existential subject matter, and alternately sung and rapped vocals. It features a mixture of braggadocio and emotional lyrics, exploring themes of fame, romance, and wealth. The album also highlights other topics, such as Drake's relationships with friends and family, as well as touching on sex and narcissism.

Despite leaking online nine days before its scheduled release, Take Care debuted at number one on the Billboard 200, selling 631,000 copies in its first week. It has been certified Diamond by the Recording Industry Association of America (RIAA). Four of the album's singles peaked in the top 20 on the Billboard Hot 100: "Headlines", "Make Me Proud", "The Motto", and "Take Care". The album received acclaim from critics, with praise for its expansive production and emotional themes. It was named one of 2011's best albums, and subsequently one of the best albums of the 2010s, by several publications. It won Drake his first Grammy Award, winning Best Rap Album at the 2013 Grammy Awards. In 2020, the album was ranked 95th on Rolling Stone's updated list of the 500 Greatest Albums of All Time.

== Background and recording ==
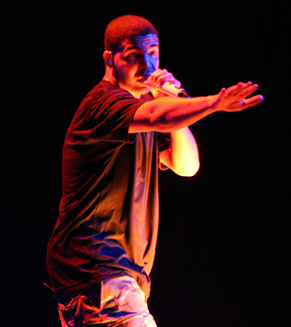
Drake broadened his concert performances in between albums.

In 2010, Drake released his debut album Thank Me Later, continuing his creative partnership with record producer and audio engineer Noah "40" Shebib, who had first introduced his distinct sound on Drake's breakthrough mixtape So Far Gone (2009). Thank Me Later became a commercial success and was well received by music critics. Prior to Take Care, Drake also expanded his repertoire as a live performer. For the album, he intended to have Shebib handle most of the production and record a more cohesive sound than on Thank Me Later, which featured disparate production duties by Shebib and others. In November 2010, Drake revealed the title of his next studio album will be Take Care. In comparison to his debut album Drake revealed to Y.C Radio 1 that Thank Me Later was a rushed album, stating, "I didn't get to take the time that I wanted to on that record. I rushed a lot of the songs and sonically I didn't get to sit with the record and say, 'I should change this verse.' [...] Once it was done, it was done. That's why my new album is called Take Care because I get to take my time this go-round." Drake mentioned after OVO Fest 2011 that Take Care could have up to 18 songs on it, and added that Stevie Wonder contributed to the creative direction of the album and will be featured on the album as well. Drake also revealed that the album was recorded mainly in Toronto. Debating whether to submit his final cut or not, Drake's preferred release date that motivated him to create a "Birthday edition", much like a deluxe edition to be released on the iTunes Store.

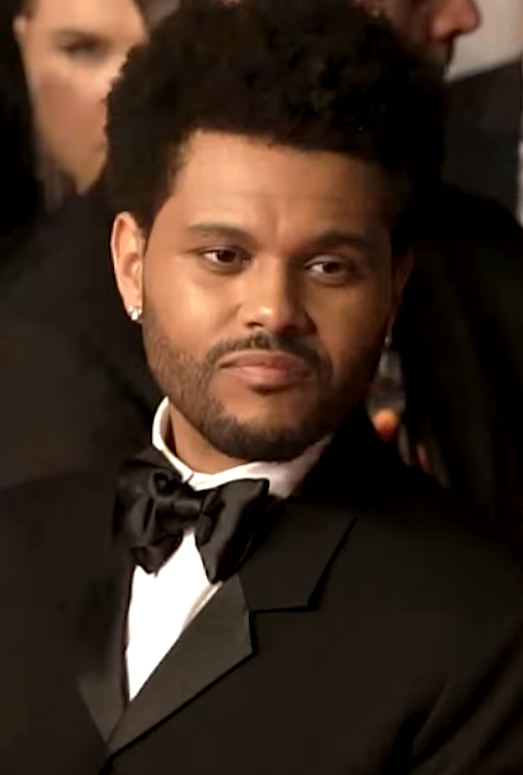
Canadian singer The Weeknd (pictured in 2023), stated he "gave up almost half of [his] album" to Drake for Take Care. Drake claimed the statement to be false.

Canadian singer The Weeknd stated in a 2013 interview that half of the tracks he had written for his 2011 debut mixtape House of Balloons did happen to end up on Take Care. The singer said he "gave up almost half of [his] album" but that he is "thankful" because he would not know where he would be if it "wasn't for the light [Drake] shined on [him]". Drake and Shebib both disputed the statement. In addition to Shebib, who was Take Care's primary producer, several other producers were revealed to be working with Drake on the album, including T-Minus, the xx's Jamie Smith and Boi-1da (who is a long-time Drake collaborator). He had initially recruited 9th Wonder for the album. He even appeared on 9th's documentary The Wonder Year and expressed his desire to make a number one hit with him, however, in an interview about a month prior to the slated release date, 9th said that he was not on the album. 9th states that was a part of the reason, because he was going through an A&R and playing beats for them as opposed to the artist himself, which he is opposed to. Drake had also been planning on having Q-Tip, DJ Premier, and the Neptunes as producers on the album, but those projects fell through as well. Several artists were confirmed as collaborators with Drake on Take Care consist of Stevie Wonder, Kendrick Lamar, Chantal Kreviazuk, André 3000, Rick Ross, Lil Wayne, Nicki Minaj and Rihanna. He had initially reached out to Phonte of the group Little Brother (who is a major influence on his career). The track was made for Take Care, but did not make it for the album, due to an issue he had with the producer. Drake admits in an interview to "dropping the ball" on the project and is optimistic about a future collaboration with Phonte. Another planned collaboration that never came to fruition would have featured Justin Timberlake. Reflecting on the unreleased song, Drake remarked: "It was solid, a solid little look. But he's so immersed in the acting thing, and I don't blame him, he's doing great at it. He was just like, 'I really want to work. I just can't do it right now. But we'll work as soon as I'm back in the studio.'" They later collaborated on the song "Cabaret" for Timberlake's 2013 album The 20/20 Experience - 2 of 2.

== Composition ==
Take Care expands on the low-tempo, sensuous, and dark sonic aesthetic of Thank Me Later. Primarily a hip hop album, it has a languid, grandiose production that incorporates R&B, pop, electronica, and post-dubstep styles. The music is typified by an atmospheric sound, muted textures, slow tempos, subtle chords, melodic synth tracks, low-end grooves, and sparse, ambient arrangements. Noah "40" Shebib contributed to most of the album's production with murky beats, dark synth layers, atmospheric keyboards, moody guitar sounds, smooth piano, muffled drums, dramatic flourishes, and low-pass filters. Although he is credited as producer for only eight of the album's 17 songs, Shebib also served as audio engineer and mix engineer on the album. His production for the album is characteristic of the Toronto hip hop scene, which experienced a mainstream breakthrough with Shebib's work with Drake, producers Boi-1da and T-Minus, and singer-songwriter the Weeknd, all of whom contributed to Take Care. Evan Rytlewski of The A.V. Club comments that the album is "crafted primarily around the oblique production of Drake's native Toronto—all rippling synths, distant pulses, and purposeful empty space".

Music writers noted "late-night" and 1990s-era R&B influence in the album's music. NPR writer Frannie Kelley notes "minimalist reworkings of TLC's minor-key soul and [...] trancey rhythms that land somewhere between paranoid Sly Stone and smoked-out Maxwell". Ryan Dombal of Pitchfork Media comments that the music "breathes heavy somewhere between UGK's deep funk, quiet-storm 90s R&B, and James Blake-inspired minimalism", and interprets its subtle style to be "a direct rebuke" to the prevalence of European dance influences in mainstream music. Los Angeles Times writer Todd Martens views that the album's mood and style are modelled after Kanye West's 2008 album 808s & Heartbreak.

Other producers' tracks are more up-tempo and shift from the melancholic mood of Shebib's production. Songs on the album are lengthy, sonically expansive, and accompanied by playful interludes. Lauren Carter of the Boston Herald writes of the song structure on Take Care, "Musical themes vanish and re-appear, layers build upon layers and then strip down to bare bones as tightly wound tracks give way to gauzy, lush interludes. Most songs sound intentionally distorted and warped". Drake's vocals on the album feature emotional crooning, alto vocals, a guttural cadence, a melodic flow, and a larger emphasis on singing than on his previous album, Thank Me Later.

== Lyrics ==
Drake's not the first to ponder such dim realities ... Take Care, however, raises the stakes by fully dwelling in that discomfort zone where not just sex, but every personal exchange — with admirers, among friends, within a family — starts to feel like a financial transaction. Extending the mood of his self-doubt takes Drake beyond the realm of self-pity, offering a critique of the very culture that's created him as an artist.

— Ann Powers, on the theme of wealth, NPR

The album's subject matter expands on Thank Me Later's theme of ambivalence and conflicted feelings toward fame. Drake's lyrics on Take Care address failed romances, missed connections, relationship with friends and family, maintaining balance with growing wealth and fame, concerns about leading a hollow life, the passage of young adulthood, and despondency. The album's slower songs generally explore themes of loneliness, heartbreak, and mistrust. The topic of women is prevalent on the album, with songs that address past and potential lovers ("Marvins Room", "The Real Her") and songs about revering ("Make Me Proud") and lavishing them ("We'll Be Fine"). Juan Edgardo Rodriguez of No Ripcord denotes women as "the main force in his songs – he's consciously aware about what it takes to love them, but simply decides to thrust aside the guidelines because he's on an entirely different stratosphere from any female average joe."

The album's expositional content is interpreted by critics in relation to contemporary society. Newsday's Glenn Gamboa views that Drake's "emotional self-doubt and realizations about [...] success", along with the album's melancholy mood, "captur[es] today's zeitgeist of uncertainty and diminishing expectations." Music journalist Ann Powers cites Drake's "predicament — the inability to locate oneself within everyday power relations" as "one that's afflicted existential antiheroes throughout modernity." She denotes his point of view as that of a "biracial upper middle-class kid [...] from a position of privilege that few rappers would occupy", and finds his subject matter culturally significant, stating "[H]is melancholia is that of the overly sated [...] But Drake's relentless focus on the point where money empties out happiness isn't merely autobiographical. It's emblematic of our moment of crashed markets and occupied streets, and it speaks to a generation beginning to question whether the All-American, celebrity-endorsed credit card lifestyle will make them anything but bankrupt." Pitchfork Media's Ryan Dombal compares his "unrepentant navel-gazing and obsession with lost love" to Marvin Gaye's 1978 album Here, My Dear, adding that Drake's "penchant for poetic oversharing" makes him "an apt avatar" for the Information Age.

Drake's songwriting is characterized by wistful introspection, existential contemplation, and minimal boasting, with lyrics that convey frankness, vulnerability, melancholia, and narcissism. Andy Gill of The Independent writes that he "eschews anger or threat for a weariness shadowed by wistful regret." Music journalist Greg Kot comments that Drake does not "indulge in the macho poses that have dominated mainstream hip-hop for decades, and blur[s] the line between singing and rhyming", adding that he "makes his rhymes sound conversational, matter of fact, like he's talking to the listener one-one-one". Tim Sendra of AllMusic notes that his "introspective tone [...] is only rarely punctured by aggressive tracks, boasts, and/or come-ons." Drake's persona on songs shows traits of sincerity, self-doubt, regret, passive-aggressiveness, and self-absorption. Kazeem Famuyide of The Source explains his conflicted persona as being "arrogant enough to know his place as one of the most successful artist in hip-hop, and comfortable enough to realize his own faults in his personal life." Jon Dolan of Rolling Stone writes that Drake "collapse[s] many moods – arrogance, sadness, tenderness and self-pity – into one vast, squish-souled emotion." Kevin Ritchie of NOW notes "an overwhelming sense of alienation, and sadness" on Take Care, calling it "an idiosyncratic, aggressively self-conscious and occasionally sentimental album".

== Release and promotion ==
The first track Drake released was "Dreams Money Can Buy" on May 20, 2011, through his October's Very Own blog. Drake mentioned this song was "A Story of Dreams, mixed with reality," and that this was not his first single off the album but that it would be included on Take Care. On June 9, 2011, a second track titled "Marvins Room" was released via his blog. Drake initially stated that the song would not be featured on Take Care, but because of the song's unexpected success, prompting it was released as a digital and radio single on July 22, 2011, and would be on Take Care. "Trust Issues" was then released shortly after on his blog, but was confirmed not to be on the album via Drake's Twitter. He explained that the song was an idea he had from I'm On One and made it "just for fun." However, in an interview, Drake stated that Trust Issues, along with Dreams Money Can Buy, would be included in the Birthday Edition of the album.

On September 10, 2011, Drake released a new song titled "Club Paradise" on his October's Very Own blog. "Dropping this for our boy Avery...this was his favorite sh*t during the recording process. 2 more songs coming tonight as well. ovoxo," he wrote on his blog. On September 11, 2011, Drake released another track entitled "Free Spirit" featuring Rick Ross and blogged that another was to be released that night, as well. Later that night he released a remix of Waka Flocka Flame's "Round of Applause". On September 23, 2011, Drake released the official album cover to Take Care. With a striking resemblance, the album cover is likely inspired by Labi Siffre's 1975 album, Remember My Song. On October 20, 2011, an unfinished version of "The Real Her" featuring only Lil Wayne was leaked online. On October 8, 2011, Drake announced on his OVO blog that Take Care would be pushed back until November 15 because of three sample clearances ("Take Care", "Cameras", and "Practice"). It was originally to be released on his 25th birthday, October 24, 2011.

The Club Paradise Tour was revealed to start in November on Twitter. However, it was revealed that the tour was delayed until after Christmas/New Year break so Drake could perform at more schools. A chopped and screwed version of the album remixed by OG Ron C and DJ Candlestick of the Chopstars titled Chop Care was released on November 29, 2011, and received over 1 million downloads in the first 48 hours. It was featured on a variety of media blogs, magazines, and newspapers. It was included on year-end lists by several publications, including The New York Times which gave major praise.

== Singles ==
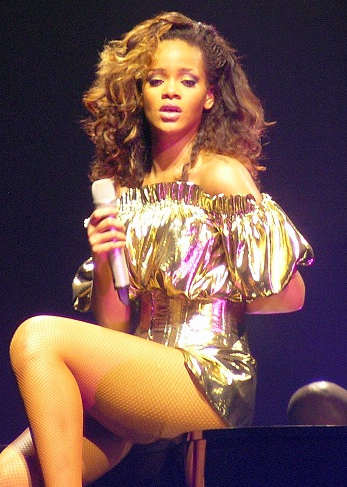
Recording artist Rihanna contributed vocals to "Take Care".

According to Billboard, as of 2022, Take Care is one of the 15 best-performing 21st-century albums without any of its singles being number-one hits on the Billboard Hot 100. The album's lead single, "Marvins Room" impacted urban radio on June 28, 2011; peaking at number 21 on the US Billboard Hot 100. Following by the second single, "Headlines", which was released through his blog on July 31, 2011. The production on both of these songs was handled by Boi-1da and Noah "40" Shebib; it was released to radio and iTunes on August 9, 2011. "Headlines" debuted at number 13 on the US Billboard Hot 100 and number 98 on the Billboard's Hot R&B/Hip-Hop Songs chart.

"Make Me Proud" featuring Nicki Minaj, was released through Drake's blog on October 13, 2011, as the album's third single. The song was produced by T-Minus and Kromatik. It was released to iTunes on October 16, 2011. The song peaked at number 9 on the US Billboard Hot 100.

The album's fourth single, "The Motto" featuring Lil Wayne, impacted rhythmic radio and urban radio stations on November 29, 2011. It was re-released to rhythmic radio on January 10, 2012. It officially impacted Top 40/Mainstream radio on April 10, 2012. The single debuted at number 18 on the US Billboard Hot 100, with first-week sales of 124,000 copies. It has since sold over 3 million copies in the United States, becoming the most successful single from the album thus far and his third single overall to reach the milestone.

"Take Care" featuring Rihanna, was released as the album's fifth single. It impacted US rhythmic contemporary radio on January 17, 2012. Prior to its release as a single, the song entered the UK Singles Chart on November 20, 2011, at number 12. It also debuted at number nine on the US Billboard Hot 100. "Take Care" became one of Drake's highest-charting songs as a solo artist in the United Kingdom and United S, with first-week sales of 162,000 in the US. In its seventeenth week on the Hot 100, the track rose to a new peak of number seven. As of July 2012 the single has sold over two million digital copies.

"HYFR (Hell Ya Fucking Right)" was released as the album's sixth single. Lil Wayne is also featured on this track. The music video shoot for the song took place on March 21, 2012. The video was released on April 6, 2012. It officially impacted rhythmic and urban radio on April 24, 2012.

"Crew Love" was released as the album's seventh single in the United Kingdom on July 30, 2012. The song peaked at number 37 on the UK Singles Chart and number 80 on both the US Billboard Hot 100 and the Canadian Hot 100.

== Critical reception ==
Professional ratings
Aggregate scores
Source	Rating
AnyDecentMusic?	7.2/10
Metacritic	78/100
Review scores
Source	Rating
AllMusic	4/5 stars
The A.V. Club	A−
Chicago Tribune	3/4 stars
Entertainment Weekly	C+
The Independent	4/5 stars
Los Angeles Times	3/4 stars
NME	8/10
Pitchfork	8.6/10
Rolling Stone	4/5 stars
Spin	8/10

Take Care received acclaim from critics. John McDonnell of NME dubbed it "an affecting masterpiece" and commended its "delicate, mellifluous sound and unashamedly candid, emotive lyrics." Pitchfork's Ryan Dombal found Drake's "technical abilities" to be improved and stated, "Just as his thematic concerns have become richer, so has the music backing them up." Andy Hutchins of The Village Voice called it "a carefully crafted bundle of contradictory sentiments from a conflicted rapper who explores his own neuroses in as compelling a manner as anyone not named Kanye West." Chicago Tribune writer Greg Kot complimented the depth of Drake's "moral psychodramas" and stated, "the best of it affirms that Drake is shaping a pop persona with staying power."

Nitsuh Abebe of New York wrote that the album "is full of gorgeous tones ... And the lyrics surrounding them can be rich with meaning". Evan Rytlewski of The A.V. Club found it "plenty downbeat, but [also] gorgeous, an immersive headphone masterwork that's tender and intimate like little else in contemporary rap and R&B." Ann Powers of NPR felt that "the artfulness of this music allows me an in to that experience. I can make that leap and identify with Drake, or at least be intrigued by multiple characters in the little dramas he designs." Jon Caramanica of The New York Times called it "an album of eccentric black pop that takes" hip hop and R&B "as starting points, asks what they can do but haven't been doing, then attempts those things. In the future an album like this will be commonplace; today, it's radical." With Take Care, he named Drake "hip-hop's current center of gravity".

=== Accolades ===
According to Metacritic, Take Care was the ninth-highest-ranked album in year-end top 10 lists by music critics, based on 135 lists. It was named the best album of 2012 by the Los Angeles Times and The New York Times, and was ranked number three by Now and MTV, number four by Slate, number five by Billboard and The Washington Post, number seven by Fact, number eight by The Globe and Mail, NPR, and Pitchfork, number 14 by Slant Magazine, and number 22 by Rolling Stone and Spin. It was also named as a longlisted nominee for the 2012 Polaris Music Prize on June 14, 2012. In 2012, Complex named the album one of the classic albums of the last decade. Take Care won a Grammy Award for Best Rap Album at the 55th Grammy Awards. In October 2013, Complex named it the fourth-best hip hop album of the last five years. In January 2015, Billboard named it the sixth-best album of the 2010s (so far). In September 2020, it was named the 95th greatest album of all time by Rolling Stone.

== Commercial performance ==
Take Care debuted at number one on the US Billboard 200, with first-week sales of 631,000 copies, becoming Drake's second number-one album. The album also topped the Billboard Rap Albums and R&B/Hip-Hop Albums in its debut week. On January 31, 2012, the album was certified platinum by the Recording Industry Association of America (RIAA) for shipments of one million copies in the United States. As of August 2015, the album has sold 2,260,000 copies in the United States. On October 25, 2023, the album was certified eight times platinum for combined sales and album-equivalent units of over eight million copies in the United States. Eventually, the album was certified diamond by the RIAA on October 24, 2025.

In Canada, the album debuted at number one on the Canadian Albums Chart, selling 48,000 copies in its first week. It has been certified double platinum by the Canadian Recording Industry Association, indicating shipments of 160,000 copies. In the United Kingdom, Take Care entered at number five on the UK Albums Chart and on January 18, 2013, the album went platinum with the British Recorded Music Industry, with 300,000 copies shipped to UK retailers.

== Track listing ==
Credits adapted from the album's liner notes.

No.	Title	Writer(s)	Producer(s)	Length
1.	"Over My Dead Body"	Aubrey Graham; Noah Shebib; Chantal Kreviazuk; Anthony Palman	40; Kreviazuk^{[a]}	4:32
2.	"Shot for Me"	Graham; Shebib; Abel Tesfaye; Brian Morgan; Blanchaer Millar; Ray Smith; Tyrone Armstrong	40	3:44
3.	"Headlines"	Graham; Matthew Samuels; Shebib; Palman	Boi-1da; 40^{[b]}; Hikwa MM^{[b]}	3:56
4.	"Crew Love" (featuring the Weeknd)	Graham; Tesfaye; Carlo Montagnese; Shebib; Palman	Illangelo; The Weeknd; 40	3:28
5.	"Take Care" (featuring Rihanna)	Graham; Jamie Smith; Shebib; Palman; Romy Croft; Brook Benton; Wally Gold; John Gluck; Herbert Wiener; Seymour Gottlieb	Jamie xx; 40	4:37
6.	"Marvins Room"	Graham; Shebib; Adrian Eccleston; Jason Beck	40	5:47
7.	"Buried Alive Interlude" (performed by Kendrick Lamar (Note: on physical copies, "Marvins Room" and "Buried Alive (Interlude)" are combined onto one track))	Graham; Kendrick Duckworth; Shebib; Dwayne Chin-Quee	40; Supa Dups	2:31
8.	"Under Ground Kings"	Graham; Tyler Williams; Shebib; Palman; Dwayne Carter; Tauheed Epps; Ronald Williams; Siccaturie Alcock; Duane Stephenson; Earl Conyers; Joshua Banks; Tristan Jones	T-Minus; 40	3:32
9.	"We'll Be Fine" (featuring Birdman)	Graham; Bryan Williams; T. Williams; Shebib; Palman	T-Minus; 40	4:08
10.	"Make Me Proud" (featuring Nicki Minaj)	Graham; Onika Maraj; T. Williams; Palman; Shebib; Nikhil Seetharam; Kenza Samir	T-Minus	3:39
11.	"Lord Knows" (featuring Rick Ross)	Graham; William Roberts; Justin Smith; Palman	Just Blaze	5:07
12.	"Cameras / Good Ones Go Interlude"	Graham; Shebib; Palman; Tesfaye; Beck^{[c]}; Jonathan Buck; Ngai Mcgee	40; Drake^{[a]}	7:15
13.	"Doing It Wrong"	Graham; Shebib; Eccleston; Donald Mclean	40	4:25
14.	"The Real Her" (featuring Lil Wayne and André 3000)	Graham; Carter; André Benjamin; Shebib; Faheem Najm	40; Drake^{[a]}	5:21
15.	"Look What You've Done"	Graham; Jesse Woodard; Shebib; Stephen Garrett; Jawaan Peacock; Benjamin Bush	Chase N. Cashe; 40^{[b]}	5:02
16.	"HYFR (Hell Ya Fucking Right)" (featuring Lil Wayne)	Graham; Carter; T. Williams; Shebib; Palman; Samir; Cedric Hill	T-Minus	3:26
17.	"Practice"	Graham; Shebib; Tesfaye; Eccleston; Carter; Byron Thomas; Terius Gray	40; Drake^{[a]}	3:57
18.	"The Ride"	Graham; Martin McKinney; Tesfaye; Palman; Eccleston; Austin Bascom	Doc McKinney; The Weeknd	5:51
Total length:				80:18

Digital bonus tracks
No.	Title	Writer(s)	Producer(s)	Length
19.	"The Motto" (featuring Lil Wayne)	Graham; Carter; T. Williams; Shebib; Anthony Ray	T-Minus	3:01
20.	"Hate Sleeping Alone"	Graham; Shebib; Palman; Tremaine Neverson	40	3:33
Total length:				86:17

Notes

- ^{^[a]} signifies a co-producer
- ^{^[b]} signifies an additional producer
- ^{^[c]} Beck is only a credited writer for the song "Good Ones Go Interlude"
- On the physical edition of the album, "Headlines" has a run time of 3:26 and features the "Crew Love" introduction. On the digital edition of the album, the original single version of "Headlines" is used
- On the physical edition of the album, "Marvins Room" and "Buried Alive Interlude" are listed as a single track, and Kendrick Lamar is uncredited
- "Cameras" on track 12 was co-produced by Drake, and "Good Ones Go (Interlude)" was produced by Noah "40" Shebib

Sample credits

- "Over My Dead Body" contains elements of "Sailin' Da South" (written by Cedric Hall) performed by DJ Screw.
- "Shot for Me" contains a sample of "Anything" (written by Tyrone Armstrong, Brian Morgan and Ray Smith) performed by SWV.
- "Take Care" contains elements of "I'll Take Care of You" (written by Brook Benton) performed by Gil Scott-Heron.
- "Under Ground Kings" contains elements of "Neck of the Woods" (written by Batman, Dwayne Carter, Tristan Jones, Bryan Williams and Ronald Williams) performed by Birdman featuring Lil Wayne, and elements of "Duffle Bag Boy" (written by Joshua Banks, Dwayne Carter Jr., Earl Conyers and Tauheed Epps) performed by Playaz Circle featuring Lil Wayne.
- "Cameras" contains excerpts of "Calling on You" (written by Jonathan Buck and Ngai McGee) performed by Jon B.
- "Doing It Wrong" contains elements of "The Wrong Thing to Do" written and performed by Don McLean.
- "Look What You've Done" contains elements of "If U Scared, Say U Scared" (written by Jawann Peacock and Stephen Garrett) performed by Playa.
- "HYFR (Hell Ya Fucking Right)" contains elements of "Swanging and Banging" written and performed by E.S.G. (Cedric Hall).
- "Practice" contains elements of "Back That Azz Up" (written by Dwayne Carter Jr., Terius Gray and Byron Thomas) performed by Juvenile featuring Lil Wayne and Mannie Fresh.
- "The Motto" contains elements of "She Will" (written by Dwayne Carter Jr., Aubrey Graham and Tyler Williams) performed by Lil Wayne featuring Drake; and elements of "Baby Got Back" written and performed by Sir Mix-a-Lot (Anthony Ray).

== Personnel ==
Credits for Take Care adapted from AllMusic and album's liner notes.

- Derek "MixedByAli" Ali – engineer (track 7)
- Hyghly Alleyne – photography
- André 3000 – vocals (track 14)
- Bonnie Artis – choir (track 1)
- Alyse Barnhill – choir (track 7)
- Les Bateman – system engineer
- Divine Brown – background vocals (tracks 3, 20)
- Wado Brown – organ (track 17)
- Cortez Bryant – executive producer
- Sean Buchanan – assistant engineer (track 9)
- Michael "Banger" Cadahia – engineer (tracks 14, 16, 19)
- Noel Cadastre – engineer (track 13), assistant engineer (1–6, 8–12, 14–18, 20), assistant mix engineer (2–4, 6, 7, 12, 13, 16, 18)
- Becky Campbell – assistant mix engineer (track 10)
- Noel "Gadget" Campbell – mixing (tracks 1, 2, 5, 8–10, 12.1, 14, 15, 17, 19, 20), additional bass (10)
- Dwayne "Lil Wayne" Carter – vocals (tracks 14, 16, 19), executive producer
- Lyttleton "Cartwheel" Carter – assistant engineer (tracks 13, 18)
- Chase N. Cashe – producer and instrumentation (track 15)
- Dwayne "Supa Dups" Chin-Quee – producer (track 7)
- Ariel Chobaz – engineer (track 10)
- Romy Madley Croft – guitar (track 5)
- Adrian "X" Eccleston – guitar (tracks 6, 12.1, 13, 17, 18)
- Oliver El-Khatib – A&R, executive producer
- Alvin Fields – choir director (track 11)
- Elizabeth Gallardo – assistant engineer (track 16)
- Chris Gehringer – mastering
- Chilly Gonzales – outro piano (track 6), Rhodes and lead synthesizer (track 12.2)
- Aubrey Drake Graham – executive producer, vocals, co-producer (tracks 12.1, 14, 17)
- Ricardo Gutierrez – additional mastering (track 11)
- Rose Hart – choir (track 11)
- Taylor Hill – choir (track 11)
- Sam Holland – assistant engineer (track 10)
- John Holmes – engineer (track 14)
- Tammy Infusino – choir (track 11)
- Ebony Jackson – choir (track 11)
- Erika Johnson – choir (track 11)
- Just Blaze – producer and mixing (track 11)
- Brent Kolatalo – additional engineering and additional instrumentation (track 11)
- Chantal Kreviazuk – co-producer, additional vocals, and additional piano (track 1), background vocals (20)
- Kendrick Lamar – vocals (track 7)
- Ken Lewis – choir director, additional engineering, and additional instrumentation (track 11)
- Roman Marshall – choir (track 11)
- Doc McKinney – producer and engineer (track 18)
- Nicki Minaj – vocals (track 10)
- Carlo "Illangelo" Montagnese – producer and engineer (track 4)
- John Morgan – choir (track 11)
- Greg Morrison – assistant mix engineer (track 5)
- Syren Lyric Muse – additional vocals (track 6)
- John Nettlesbey – assistant engineer (tracks 6, 13, 18)
- Nikhil – additional lead synthesizer (track 10)
- Jawan Peacock – piano and backing vocals (track 15)
- Isaiah Raheem – choir (track 11)
- Rihanna – vocals (track 5)
- Ruben Rivera – engineer (tracks 4, 5, 8–11, 16)
- Gee Roberson – executive producer
- Carmen Roman – choir (track 11)
- Rick Ross – vocals (track 11)
- Matthew "Boi-1da" Samuels – producer and instrumentation (track 3)
- Gil Scott-Heron – background vocals (track 5)
- Travis Sewchan – assistant engineer (track 2)
- Noah "40" Shebib – executive producer, A&R, producer (tracks 1, 2, 4–9, 12–14, 17, 20), engineer (1–6, 8–10, 12–15, 17, 18, 20), instrumentation (1, 2, 4, 6, 9, 12–14, 17, 20), mixing (3, 4, 6, 7, 12.2, 13, 16, 18), additional production (3, 15), additional keyboards (3, 8), drum programming (5), additional bass and assistant mix engineer (10, 19)
- Evelyn "Bubu" Sher – background vocals (track 15)
- Sasha Sirota – engineer (track 19)
- Jamie "xx" Smith – producer and instrumentation (track 5)
- Trey Songz – additional background vocals (track 20)
- Static Major – background vocals (track 15)
- David "Gordo" Strickland – mixing assistant (tracks 8, 9)
- T-Minus – producer and instrumentation (tracks 8–10, 16, 19)
- T-Pain – background vocals (track 14)
- Lamar Taylor – photography
- The Weeknd – producer (tracks 4, 18), vocals and instrumentation (4), backing vocals (12.2)
- Drew White – assistant engineer (track 20)
- Bryan "Birdman" Williams – vocals (track 9), executive producer
- Ronald "Slim Tha Don" Williams – executive producer
- Dylan Wissing – live drums (track 11)
- Stevie Wonder – harmonica (track 13)
- Martin "Drop" Wong – artwork, design
- William World – choir (track 11)
- Andrew Wright – mixing (track 11)

== Charts ==
=== Weekly charts ===
Chart (2011–2025)	Peak position
Australian Albums (ARIA)	15
Belgian Albums (Ultratop Flanders)	44
Belgian Albums (Ultratop Wallonia)	77
Canadian Albums (Billboard)	1
Danish Albums (Hitlisten)	24
Dutch Albums (Album Top 100)	38
French Albums (SNEP)	32
French Digital Albums (SNEP)	9
German Albums (Offizielle Top 100)	42
Icelandic Albums (Tónlistinn)	27
Irish Albums (IRMA)	30
Japanese Albums (Oricon)	62
New Zealand Albums (RMNZ)	19
Norwegian Albums (VG-lista)	32
Scottish Albums (Official Charts)	17
Swedish Albums (Sverigetopplistan)	55
Swiss Albums (Schweizer Hitparade)	45
UK Albums (Official Charts)	5
UK R&B Albums (Official Charts)	2
US Billboard 200	1
US Top R&B/Hip-Hop Albums (Billboard)	1
US Top Rap Albums (Billboard)	1

=== Year-end charts ===
Chart (2011)	Position
UK Albums (Official Charts)	79
Chart (2012)	Position
Canadian Albums (Billboard)	12
UK Albums (Official Charts)	65
US Billboard 200	3
US Top R&B/Hip-Hop Albums (Billboard)	1
US Top Rap Albums (Billboard)	1
Chart (2013)	Position
US Billboard 200	192
US Top R&B/Hip-Hop Albums (Billboard)	60
Chart (2015)	Position
US Billboard 200	102
Chart (2016)	Position
US Billboard 200	58
Chart (2017)	Position
US Billboard 200	63
US Top R&B/Hip-Hop Albums (Billboard)	29
Chart (2018)	Position
US Billboard 200	58
US Top R&B/Hip-Hop Albums (Billboard)	31
Chart (2019)	Position
US Billboard 200	68
US Top R&B/Hip-Hop Albums (Billboard)	31
Chart (2020)	Position
US Billboard 200	85
US Top R&B/Hip-Hop Albums (Billboard)	68
Chart (2021)	Position
US Billboard 200	78
US Top R&B/Hip-Hop Albums (Billboard)	47
Chart (2022)	Position
US Billboard 200	59
US Top R&B/Hip-Hop Albums (Billboard)	28
Chart (2023)	Position
US Billboard 200	42
US Top R&B/Hip-Hop Albums (Billboard)	18
Chart (2024)	Position
Australian Hip Hop/R&B Albums (ARIA)	26
US Billboard 200	46
US Top R&B/Hip-Hop Albums (Billboard)	14
Chart (2025)	Position
Australian Albums (ARIA)	89
Australian Hip Hop/R&B Albums (ARIA)	20
Belgian Albums (Ultratop Flanders)	155
Icelandic Albums (Tónlistinn)	98
UK Albums (Official Charts)	68
US Billboard 200	38
US Top R&B/Hip-Hop Albums (Billboard)	9

=== Decade-end charts ===
Chart (2010–2019)	Position
US Billboard 200	45

== Certifications ==
Region	Certification	Certified units/sales
Australia (ARIA)	2× Platinum	140,000^{‡}
Canada (Music Canada)	4× Platinum	320,000^{‡}
Germany (BVMI)	Gold	100,000^{‡}
Italy (FIMI)	Gold	25,000^{‡}
New Zealand (RMNZ)	3× Platinum	45,000^{‡}
United Kingdom (BPI)	3× Platinum	900,000^{‡}
United States (RIAA)	Diamond	10,000,000^{‡}
^{‡} Sales+streaming figures based on certification alone.

== Release history ==
Region	Date	Format	Label	Ref.
Australia	November 14, 2011	CD; digital download	Universal Music; Cash Money	
Belgium	November 14, 2011	CD; digital download	Universal Music; Cash Money	
Denmark	November 14, 2011	CD; digital download	Universal Music; Cash Money	
Germany	November 14, 2011	CD; digital download	Universal Music; Cash Money	
France	November 14, 2011	CD; digital download	Universal Music; Cash Money	
Ireland	November 14, 2011	CD; digital download	Universal Music; Cash Money	
Italy	November 14, 2011	CD; digital download	Universal Music; Cash Money	
Netherlands	November 14, 2011	CD; digital download	Universal Music; Cash Money	
New Zealand	November 14, 2011	CD; digital download	Universal Music; Cash Money	
Norway	November 14, 2011	CD; digital download	Universal Music; Cash Money	
Spain	November 14, 2011	CD; digital download	Universal Music; Cash Money	
Sweden	November 14, 2011	CD; digital download	Universal Music; Cash Money	
Switzerland	November 14, 2011	CD; digital download	Universal Music; Cash Money	
United Kingdom	November 14, 2011	CD; digital download	Young Money; Cash Money; Universal Island	
United States	November 15, 2011	CD; digital download	Young Money; Cash Money; Republic	
Canada	November 15, 2011	CD; digital download	Young Money; Cash Money; Republic	
Japan	November 30, 2011	CD	Universal Music Japan; Cash Money	

== See also ==
- List of number-one albums of 2011 (U.S.)
- List of number-one R&B albums of 2011 (U.S.)
- List of number-one R&B albums of 2012 (U.S.)
- List of number-one rap albums of 2011 (U.S.)
- List of number-one rap albums of 2012 (U.S.)
- List of number-one albums of 2011 (Canada)
- PBR&B
