= HYFR (Hell Ya Fucking Right) =

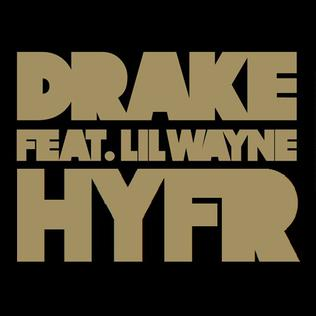

Single by Drake featuring Lil Wayne

from the album Take Care
- Released: April 24, 2012
- Recorded: 2011
- Genre: Hip hop
- Length: 3:27
- Label: Young Money; Cash Money; Republic
- Songwriters: Aubrey Graham; Dwayne Carter; Tyler Williams; Anthony Palman; Kenza Samir; Noah Shebib; Gavin Overstreet
- Producer: T-Minus

Drake singles chronology
"Stay Schemin'" (2012)	"HYFR (Hell Ya Fucking Right)" (2012)	"No Lie" (2012)

Lil Wayne singles chronology
"Take It to the Head" (2012)	"HYFR (Hell Ya Fucking Right)" (2012)	"I Can Only Imagine" (2012)

Music video
- "HYFR" on YouTube

"HYFR (Hell Ya Fucking Right)" is a song by Canadian rapper Drake from his second studio album Take Care (2011). The song features Lil Wayne and was released as the album's sixth official single. It was released to radio stations on April 24, 2012. The song was nominated for the 55th Grammy Awards for Best Rap Performance, but lost to "Niggas in Paris" by Jay-Z and Kanye West.

== Music video ==
The music video, directed by Director X, produced by Michelle Larkin, was filmed on March 21, 2012 in Miami's Temple Israel, and at a local school and daycare center. It was released on April 6, 2012 along with the music video for "Take Care". The video portrays Drake having a Bar Mitzvah. Lil Wayne makes an appearance to deliver his verse, and Birdman, DJ Khaled, Trey Songz, Mack Maine, T-Minus, E-40, and Noah "40" Shebib, VitalyzdTV make cameo appearances as guests during the re-Bar Mitzvah and the reception. It won Best Hip-Hop Video at the 2012 MTV Video Music Awards and Video of the Year at the Juno Awards of 2013. As of January 2015, Billboard named the video as the third best music video of the 2010s (so far).

== Critical reception ==
Billboard commented on the track by saying "With a bit of "Swanging and Banging," T-Minus delivers a rock-influenced platform for teacher and student to squash questions with an acronym." Rolling Stone described the song by saying "Drake opens the track with a whiplash verse or two before passing the mic for a Weezy showcase: he rhymes "hold her" and "closure" and raps "I met a female dragon had a fire conversation." Apparently, the phrase "hell yeah fuckin' right" is something they yell at journalists who ask questions like "how high they are?" and "do you they think the people around you are really your friend." In their defense, those are terrible questions. I would ask Weezy about the NBA lockout and ask Drake where the best place is to buy an obscenely overpriced candelabra." Popdust gave the album a positive review and commented on the track by saying ""Hell yeah / Hell yeah, hell yeah / Fuckin’ right / Fuckin’ right, all right" is gonna make for one hell of a chorus sing along on future I Am Still Music tour installments, and the T-Minus (of "She Will" and "I’m On One" fame) beat is appropriately hands-in-the-air for such a statement."

The song was nominated for the 55th Grammy Awards for Best Rap Performance.

== Chart performance ==
The song debuted at number 92 on the US Billboard Hot 100 following the release of Take Care. The song later re-entered the Hot 100 chart at number 100 and gradually ascended the chart to eventually peak at number 62. The song remained on the chart for a total of 20 weeks. The song was eventually certified double platinum by the Recording Industry Association of America (RIAA) for sales of over two million digital copies in the United States.

== Credits and personnel ==
Credits for the song are adapted from the liner notes of Take Care.

Recording

- Recorded at: Metalworks Studios in Toronto, Ontario.

Personnel

- Drake – songwriting, vocals
- Lil Wayne – songwriting, vocals
- N.Cobey – songwriting, production
- T-Minus (producer) – production, songwriting, instruments
- Noah "40" Shebib – songwriting, mixing
- Cedric Hill – songwriting
- Ruben Rivera – recording
- Michael "Banger" Cadahia – recording
- Noel Cadastre – assistant mix engineering

Sample credit

- Contains elements of "Swanging and Banging", as performed by E.S.G. and written by Cedric Hill.
- Contains elements of "Knocked Out", as Performed by Paula Abdul.

== Charts ==
=== Weekly charts ===
Weekly chart performance
Chart (2012)	Peak position
US Billboard Hot 100	62
US Hot R&B/Hip-Hop Songs (Billboard)	20

=== Year-end charts ===
Annual chart rankings
Chart (2012)	Position
US Hot R&B/Hip-Hop Songs (Billboard)	83
US On-Demand Songs (Billboard)	27
US Rap Songs (Billboard)	49

== Certifications ==
Region	Certification	Certified units/sales
Australia (ARIA)	Gold	35,000^{‡}
United Kingdom (BPI)	Silver	200,000^{‡}
United States (RIAA)	2× Platinum	2,000,000^{‡}
^{‡} Sales+streaming figures based on certification alone.

== Release history ==
Country	Date	Format
United States	April 24, 2012	Rhythmic contemporary radio
United States	April 24, 2012	Urban contemporary radio
United Kingdom	May 28, 2012	Contemporary hit radio
