= Marvins Room =

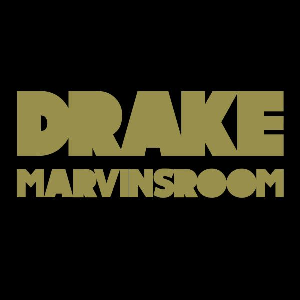

Single by Drake

from the album Take Care
- Released: June 28, 2011
- Recorded: April 2011
- Studio: Marvin's Room
- Genre: Alternative R&B
- Length: 5:47 (single version and digital album version); 8:15 (physical album version, joined with "Buried Alive Interlude")
- Label: Young Money; Cash Money; Republic
- Songwriters: Aubrey Graham; Noah Shebib; Jason Beck; Adrian Eccleston; Abel Tesfaye
- Producer: 40

Drake singles chronology
"I'm on One" (2011)	"Marvins Room" (2011)	"Headlines" (2011)

"Marvins Room" is a song by Canadian recording artist Drake. It is the lead single from Drake's second studio album Take Care. Produced by 40, it features keyboard-based instrumentation and muted bass. "Marvins Room" is performed from the point of view of an inebriated Drake as he calls up an ex-girlfriend and rants about his various frustrations and loneliness. Adrian Eccleston and Gonzales provide additional musical contributions to the song. It was initially posted by Drake to his October's Very Own blog on June 9, 2011. Positive public reception to the song prompted its release as a single on June 28 to urban contemporary radio and as a digital download. "Marvins Room" was later included on Drake's second studio album Take Care, where it is followed by an interlude entitled "Buried Alive". The song features uncredited vocals from singer Ericka Lee.

Upon release as a single, it peaked at number 21 on the United States Billboard Hot 100 and reached the top 10 on the Billboard Hot R&B/Hip-Hop Songs chart. Several artists, including Chris Brown, JoJo, Lil Wayne, Sammie, Teyana Taylor, and Jonny Craig released their own freestyle and remix versions of the song. In 2012, Drake was sued by singer Ericka Lee, who performed additional vocals on the song and alleged that she had not been paid promised royalties. The suit was resolved with an out-of-court settlement in 2013.

== Composition ==
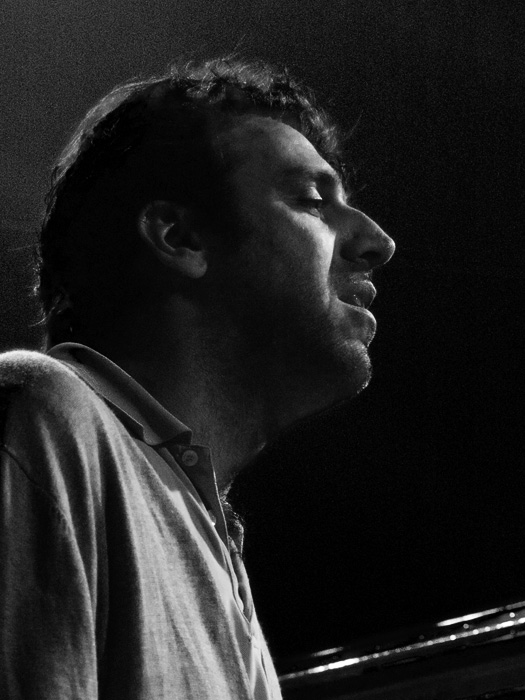
Gonzales performs the song's piano outro.

Allegedly recorded in a studio of the same name once owned by American musician Marvin Gaye, "Marvins Room" is anchored by producer 40's trademark muted bass, a trend that manifests, in the words of Jayson Greene of Pitchfork Media, "like the fumes from music that's already evaporated a wisp of keyboard – a single watery thud of bass drum." Adrian Eccleston performs additional guitar work on the song.

The song's lyrics consist of Drake's late-night drunken pleas to a former girlfriend over the phone while in a nightclub, a phenomenon referred to by critics as "drunk dialing". Despite his frustrations over their breakup and his obvious loneliness, Drake reiterates to her his superiority over his replacement and repeatedly cajoles her to return to him. He also mentions that the women with whom he has had intercourse and to whom he has provided financial support do not satisfy him. Ultimately, his plaintive requests go unrequited. "Marvins Room" concludes with a piano outro played by Canadian musician Gonzales.

== Music video ==
The music video for "Marvins Room" was posted to Drake's October's Very Own blog on June 28, 2011. It utilizes a shortened version of the song, which is slowed-down at several points of the video. The video begins with a phone call of a woman talking about her nights partying, subsequently switching to a shot of Drake seated in a bar lounge. Throughout the video, he is seen drinking and unsuccessfully flirting with various women. His inebriated state is visually depicted by out-of-focus and spinning camera shots.

== Controversy ==
In February 2012, singer Ericka Lee sued Drake, alleging that she had performed the feminine vocals on "Marvins Room" and that she was owed songwriting credits and royalties. Claiming to have previously been in a relationship with Drake, Lee stated that she had been promised four to five percent of publishing royalties, along with an extra 50,000 dollars in "hush money." Drake's legal team denied any wrongdoing and countered that Lee had not requested any monetary compensation, but merely a credit in the liner notes of Take Care under the pseudonym "Syren Lyric Muse". They added: "It was only after she retained a lawyer that there was a demand for payment. Drake tried for months to resolve the matter amicably, and he now looks forward to being vindicated in court." The case was resolved in February 2013, with both parties agreeing to an out-of-court settlement.

In 2019, singer and producer Kevin McCall accused Drake and R&B singer Tank on social media of plagiarizing his song with Chris Brown titled "No BS" (2010). McCall stated that Drake used his melody for the song "Marvins Room", and Tank used the same one for his 2016 single "#BDAY" featuring Siya, Sage the Gemini, and Chris Brown.

== Other versions ==
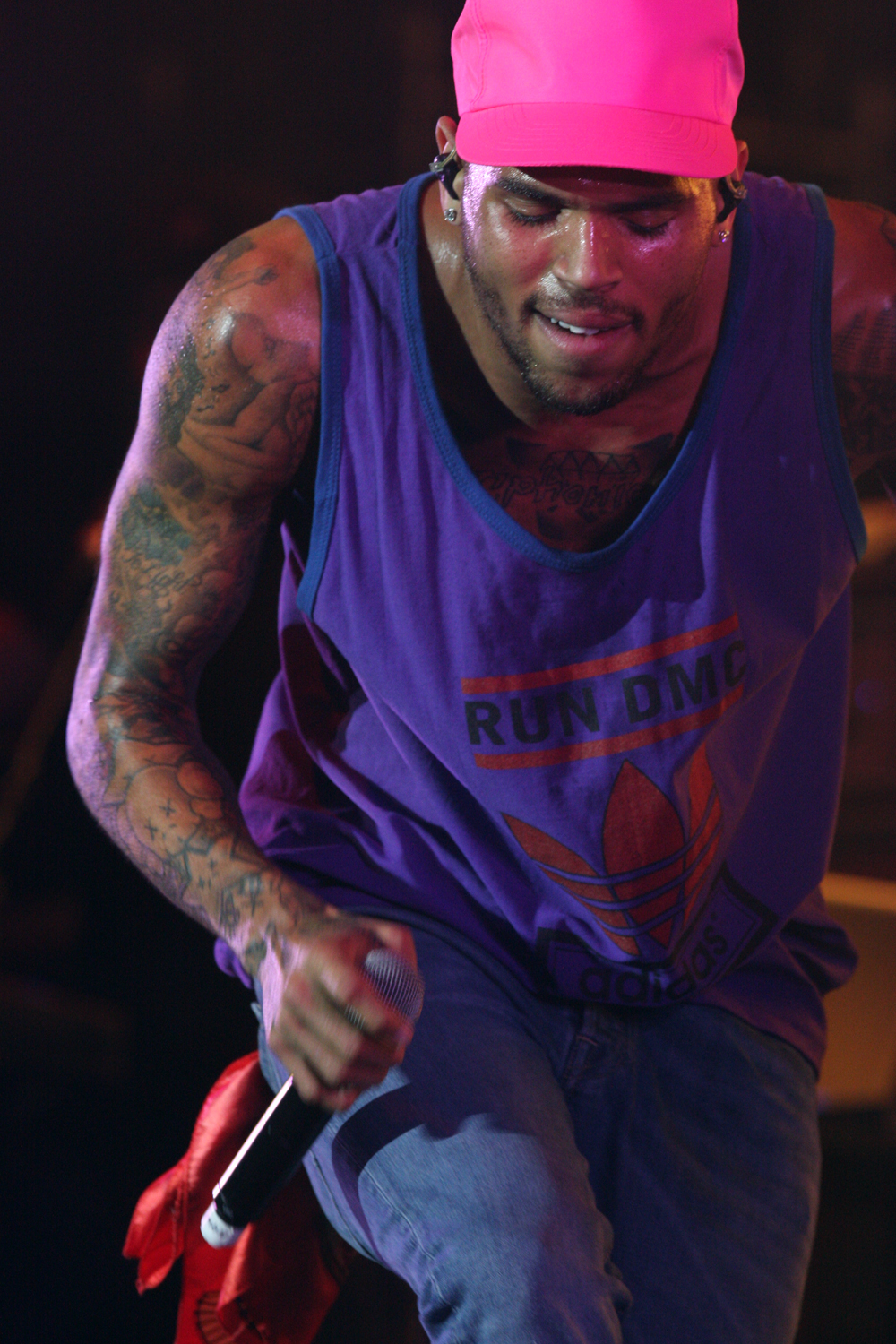
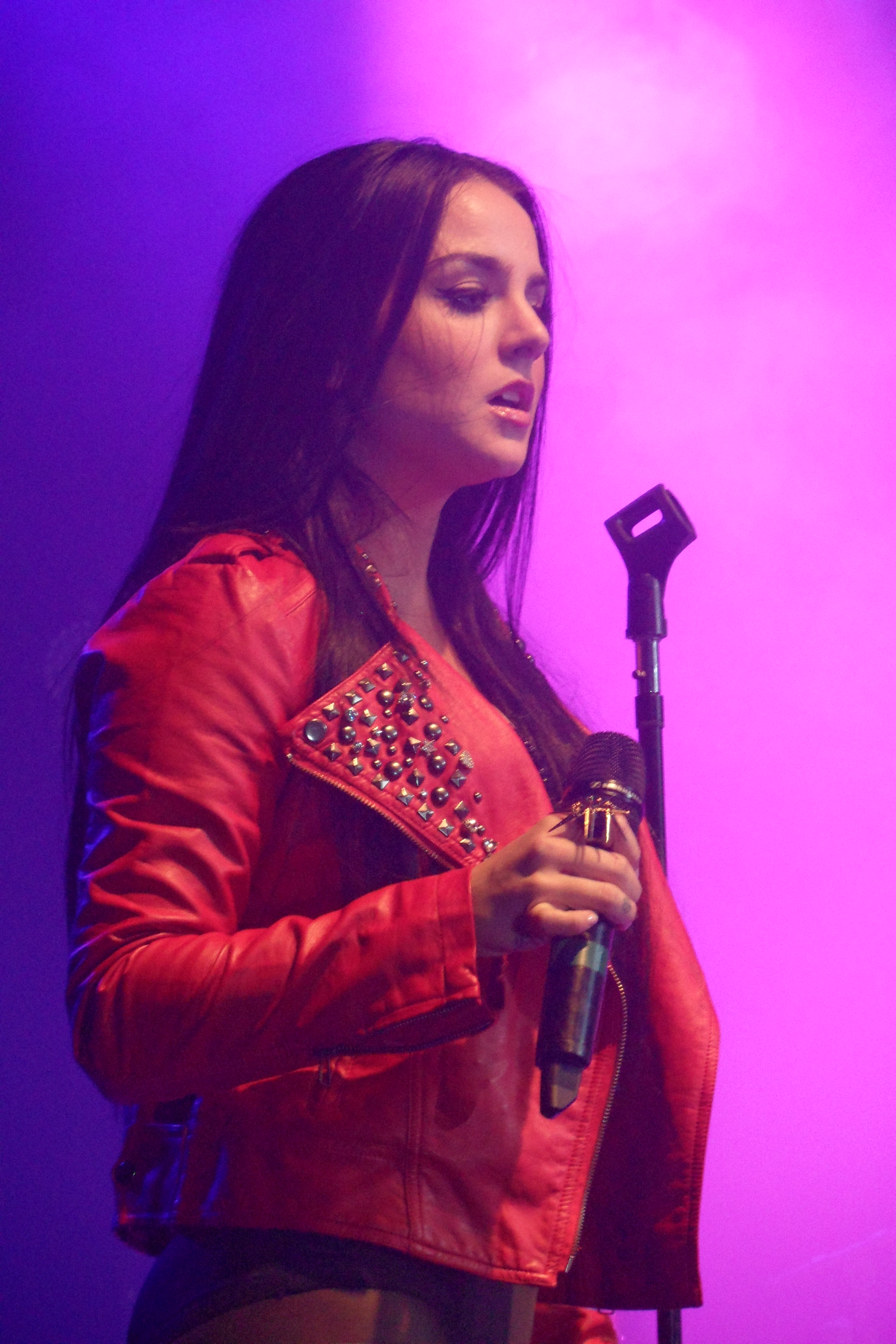
Singers Chris Brown (left) and JoJo (right) have made their own respective remix versions of the song.

Following the release of "Marvins Room", several recording artists released their own remixes and interpretations of the song. American pop/R&B singer JoJo recorded a remix entitled "Can't Do Better", which re-interprets the song's concept from a feminine standpoint. A remix of "Marvins Room" performed by R&B singer Chris Brown, which features J. Valentine, Dawn Richard, SeVen and Kevin McCall, was included on his 2011 mixtape Boy in Detention. Brown's version peaked at number 77 on the Billboard Hot R&B/Hip-Hop Songs chart. Rapper Lil Wayne recorded a freestyle over the track for his 2011 mixtape Sorry 4 the Wait. Other artists who have released their own versions of "Marvins Room" include Sammie, Cody Simpson, Paula DeAnda, Jhené Aiko, and Teyana Taylor. Marvins Room was reimagined in the genre of nu jazz by multi-platinum record producer Jonathan Hay and TV personality Solo Lucci from Love & Hip Hop.

Drake reacted positively to the various interpretations of his song, saying: "The writing is doing something to people for them to want to take it and remix it. It's very flattering, you know. Thank you to anybody that did a remix. I hope other songs on the album get reactions like that too." He expressed a special interest in JoJo's remix and commented: "In JoJo's case, she actually took the time to write really potent new lyrics. It was really shocking, I think, for her audience since throughout her career she's been kind of stereotyped as this teen pop star and then she comes out with this different kind of substance. It's very rare that people take your song and do it over like that."

== Critical reception ==
"Marvins Room" received universal acclaim by music critics, both for its lyrical content and production. Scott Shetler of PopCrush gave the song four-and-a-half stars out of five, remarking that "not many rappers are capable of writing something with such an emotional impact." Pitchfork Media's Jayson Greene also praised "Marvins Room", writing that the song "carr[ies] a muted, creeping unease no one else in hip-hop is currently quite equipped to provide" and describing it as "a shrewd reminder of what sets [Drake] apart." Ann Powers of NPR drew comparisons between the song and the life and career of American musician Marvin Gaye, stating that it "taps into the magnetic but dangerous spirit of Gaye: not only his seduction skills, but his self-doubt, the vulnerability that made his music so profound and which eventually derailed him." Rolling Stone reviewer Jody Rosen awarded the song a 3.5 star rating out of 5, writing that the song is made of "a noirishly spare beat" and described it as "bummer-rap-as-high-comedy". "Marvins Room" has also received a cult following from a number of emo and scene subcultures.

== Chart performance ==
"Marvins Room" was posted by Drake to his October's Very Own blog on June 9, 2011. His record label's parent company Universal Music initially attempted to have the song taken down from the Internet, prompting Drake to respond: "Universal needs to stop taking my fucking songs down... I am doing this for the people, not for your label." It gained considerable popularity on various radio formats in the United States despite not being officially released as a single, with Nielsen Broadcast Data Systems reporting that the song had garnered 2.4 million listener impressions from June 20 through June 26. "Marvins Room" was subsequently serviced to American urban contemporary radio on June 28. A digital download release to iTunes followed on July 22. It later debuted at number seventy-eight on the Billboard Hot R&B/Hip-Hop Songs chart, peaking at number seven on the chart week of September 24. "Marvins Room" peaked at number 21 on the US Billboard Hot 100 chart. The single was eventually certified triple platinum by the Recording Industry Association of America for sales of over three million digital copies in the United States.

== Charts ==
=== Weekly charts ===
Chart (2011)	Peak position
UK Singles (OCC)	102
UK Hip Hop/R&B (Official Charts)	37
US Billboard Hot 100	21
US Hot R&B/Hip-Hop Songs (Billboard)	7
US Rhythmic Airplay (Billboard)	20

=== Year-end charts ===
Chart (2011)	Position
US Hot R&B/Hip-Hop Songs (Billboard)	40

== Certifications ==
Certifications for "Marvins Room"
Region	Certification	Certified units/sales
Australia (ARIA)	2× Platinum	140,000^{‡}
Denmark (IFPI Danmark)	Gold	45,000^{‡}
United Kingdom (BPI)	Platinum	600,000^{‡}
United States (RIAA)	Diamond	10,000,000^{‡}
^{‡} Sales+streaming figures based on certification alone.

== Release history ==
Country	Date	Format	Label
United States	June 28, 2011	Urban contemporary radio	Young Money, Cash Money, Universal Republic
Canada	July 22, 2011	Digital download	Young Money, Cash Money
United States	July 22, 2011	Digital download	Young Money, Cash Money
United Kingdom	July 29, 2011	Digital download	Young Money, Cash Money
