= I'm on One =

2011 single by DJ Khaled

Single by DJ Khaled featuring Drake, Rick Ross and Lil Wayne

from the album We the Best Forever
- Released: May 20, 2011
- Recorded: 2010
- Genre: Hip-hop; trap
- Length: 4:56
- Label: We the Best; Terror Squad; Young Money; Cash Money; Universal Motown
- Songwriters: Khaled Khaled; Aubrey Graham; William Roberts; Dwayne Carter Jr.; Tyler Williams; Nikhil Seetharam; Noah Shebib
- Producers: T-Minus; 40; Kromatik

DJ Khaled singles chronology
"Welcome to My Hood" (2011)	"I'm on One" (2011)	"It Ain't Over Til It's Over" (2011)

Drake singles chronology
"Put It Down" (2010)	"I'm on One" (2011)	"Marvins Room" (2011)

Rick Ross singles chronology
"9 Piece" (2011)	"I'm on One" (2011)	"Anything (To Find You)" (2011)

Lil Wayne singles chronology
"Ballin'" (2011)	"I'm on One" (2011)	"How to Love" (2011)

Music video
- "I'm on One" on YouTube

"I'm on One" is a song by DJ Khaled, released as the second single from his fifth studio album, We the Best Forever. The song features Canadian rapper Drake and American rappers Rick Ross and Lil Wayne and features production from Canadian producers T-Minus, Nikhil Seetharam, and Noah "40" Shebib. It was released for digital download in the United States on May 20, 2011. Remixes and freestyles were released from rappers such as Tyga, Meek Mill, Jamie Drastik, including other rappers.

The song peaked at number ten on the Billboard Hot 100, becoming the first top-ten hit in the United States for both DJ Khaled and Rick Ross. The single was certified gold by the Recording Industry Association of America (RIAA) for sales of over 500,000 copies.

== Music video ==
DJ Khaled shot the music video for "I'm On One" featuring Drake, Rick Ross, and Lil Wayne. The visual was directed by Gil Green, with Birdman, Ace Hood, Wale, Gunplay and Mack Maine making cameos. The visual was shot in Miami in Drake's Condo House over Memorial Day Weekend. Various scenes in the video include the controversial drink Four Loko. The official music video for "I'm on One" was premiered during the BET Awards 2011. A video for the song's remix features a cameo from Ace Hood.

== Critical reception ==
"I'm on One" was nominated at the 2012 Grammy Awards for the Best Rap/Sung Collaboration award, being Khaled and Ross' first nomination, Drake's 8th and Lil Wayne's 12th, but lost to "Number One" by R. Kelly featuring Keri Hilson. XXL named this song the second best song of 2011. Billboard also ranked it at number 17 on their "Critics' Picks: 20 Best Songs of 2011."

== Chart performance ==
I'm on One peaked at number ten on the US Billboard Hot 100, becoming his sixth highest-peaking song and first top-ten hit in the United States for both DJ Khaled and Rick Ross. The song also topped the US Hot R&B/Hip-Hop Songs chart for 11 weeks, and the Hot Rap Songs chart for 13 consecutive weeks, which is the fourth-longest streak on that chart, behind Drake's "Best I Ever Had" at 15 weeks, Lil Nas X's "Old Town Road" at 17 and Missy Elliott's "Hot Boyz", featuring Nas, Eve and Q-Tip at 18. On July 22, 2011, the single was certified gold by the Recording Industry Association of America (RIAA) for sales of over 500,000 copies. As of May 2014, the song has sold 1,875,000 copies in the United States.

== Charts ==
=== Weekly charts ===
Weekly chart performance for "I'm on One"
Chart (2011–2012)	Peak position
Canada Hot 100 (Billboard)	67
UK Singles (Official Charts)	78
UK Hip Hop/R&B (Official Charts)	24
US Billboard Hot 100	10
US Hot R&B/Hip-Hop Songs (Billboard)	1
US Hot Rap Songs (Billboard)	1
US Pop Airplay (Billboard)	35
US Rhythmic Airplay (Billboard)	4

=== Year-end charts ===
Year-end chart performance for "I'm on One"
Chart (2011)	Position
US Billboard Hot 100	47
US Hot R&B/Hip-Hop Songs (Billboard)	4
US Rhythmic (Billboard)	12

=== Decade-end charts ===
Decade-end chart performance for "I'm on One"
Chart (2010–2019)	Position
US Hot R&B/Hip-Hop Songs (Billboard)	21

== Certifications ==
Certifications for "I'm on One"
Region	Certification	Certified units/sales
New Zealand (RMNZ)	Gold	15,000^{‡}
United Kingdom (BPI)	Gold	400,000^{‡}
United States (RIAA)	5× Platinum	5,000,000^{‡}
^{‡} Sales+streaming figures based on certification alone.

== Release history ==
List of release dates, record label and format details
Country	Date	Format	Label
United States	May 20, 2011	Digital download	We the Best, Terror Squad, Young Money, Cash Money, Universal Motown
United States	August 23, 2011	Mainstream airplay	We the Best, Terror Squad, Young Money, Cash Money, Universal Motown

== See also ==
- List of number-one R&B singles of 2011 (U.S.)
- List of number-one rap singles of 2011 (U.S.)
