= Headlines (Drake song) =

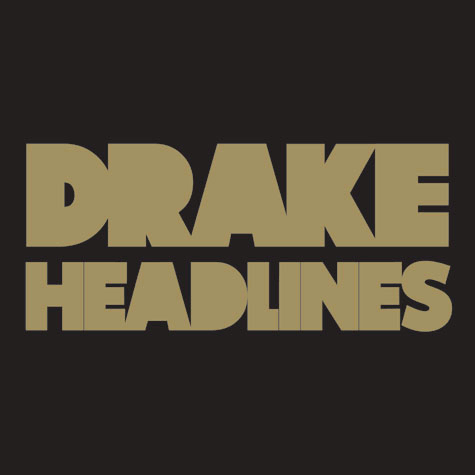

Single by Drake

from the album Take Care
- Released: August 9, 2011
- Genre: Pop rap
- Length: 3:56 (Single and digital album version); 3:27 (Physical album version w/intro to "Crew Love")
- Label: Young Money; Cash Money; Republic
- Songwriters: Aubrey Graham; Anthony Palman; Rohain Mirza; Matthew Samuels; Noah Shebib
- Producers: Boi-1da; Noah '40' Shebib; Hikwa MM

Drake singles chronology
"Marvins Room" (2011)	"Headlines" (2011)	"She Will" (2011)

Music video
- "Headlines" (Explicit) on YouTube

"Headlines" is a song by Canadian rapper Drake. It is the second single from Drake's second studio album Take Care. The song, produced by Matthew "Boi-1da" Samuels, and Noah "40" Shebib, first premiered on Drake's blog October's Very Own on July 31, 2011, and was sent to all radio formats in the US on August 9, 2011. It was released on iTunes and Amazon on August 9, 2011 in the U.S. The song debuted and peaked on the Billboard charts at number 13, becoming one of his highest charting songs at the time of release. It was re-released to US Top 40/Mainstream radio on October 18, 2011. As of December 17, 2025, "Headlines" surpassed one billion streams on Spotify.

== Background ==
On July 18, 2011, Drake told The Invasion Radio Show that he was mixing a new single. Drake also revealed the name of the single on July 18 when posting the lone word "Headlines" on his Twitter account.

In an interview with Billboard, Drake talked about "Headlines" saying, "By no means is it the best song on my album, it's really just the song for this moment, right now." Drake talked about why he released the song as the first single saying: "I always try to put forth a song with a message. A lot of people pick their single by what's the strongest song. I don't really do that. I like to make sure that the content is very relevant to right now." Drake also said, "I want people to party to it but at the same time the fans, the people that care about my career, the people that follow me, will hear a message in it." Drake told MTV News in early September that "Headlines" was the perfect tune to launch the project: "I think it's great; the purpose of that record was solely to deliver a message", he said. "I could've gone with the record that was sort of super radio-friendly, but I really just wanted to talk to the people with the first record."

== Live performances ==
The first live performance of "Headlines" took place at Caesars Windsor in Windsor, Ontario, Canada on August 4, 2011. On October 15, Drake made his Saturday Night Live debut in an episode hosted by Anna Faris and was set to perform "Headlines" as the musical guest of the week. On November 20, 2011, Drake sang "Headlines" at the American Music Awards of 2011. On December 31, 2011, Drake performed on Times Square a Medley of "Headlines" with "Make Me Proud" and "The Motto".

== Music video ==
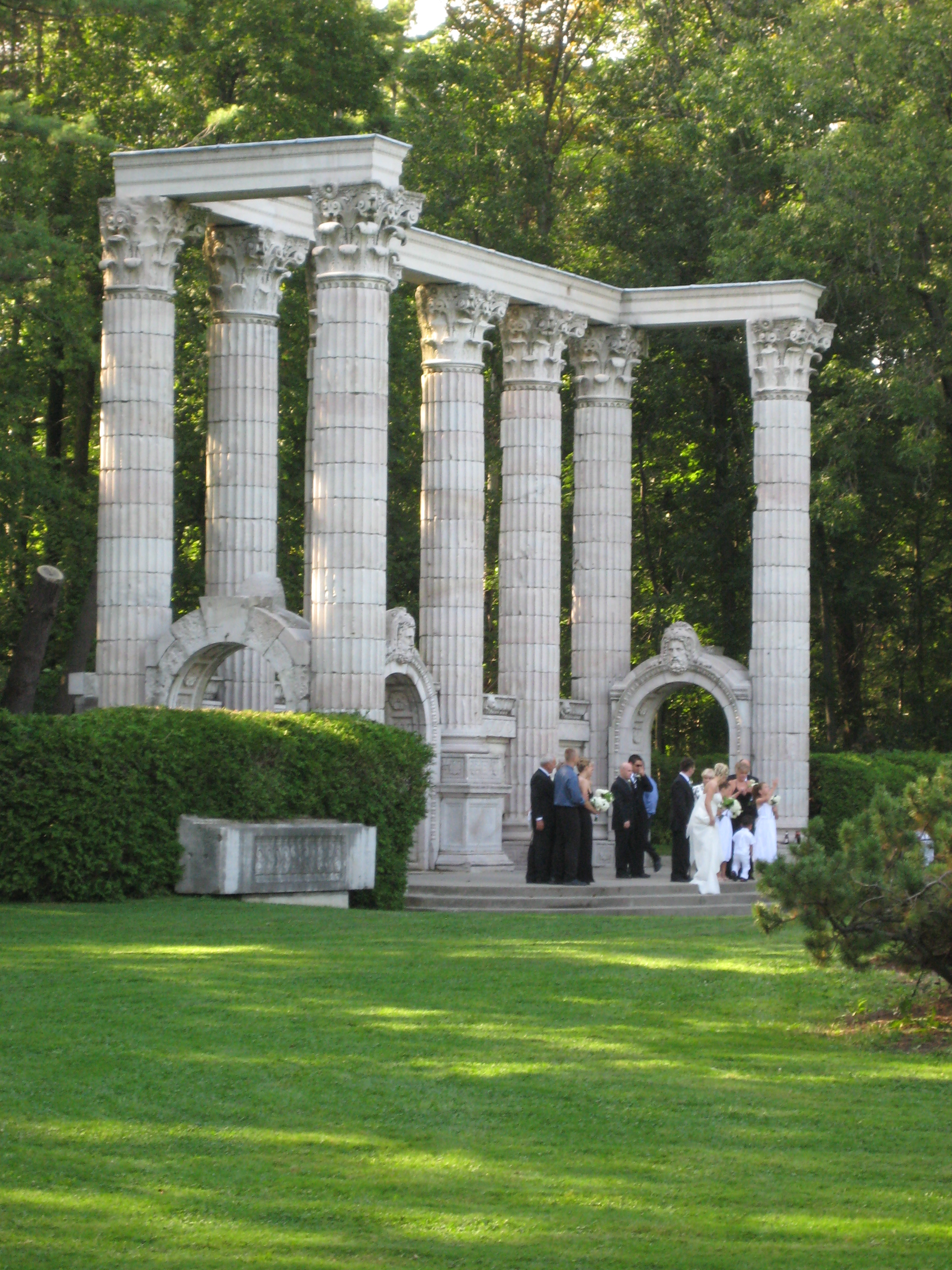
The Guild Park ruins is where one of the scenes in the music video was filmed.

The music video was directed by La Mar Taylor and Hyghly Alleyne, both related to The Weeknd's "XO" crew. It officially premiered on October 2, 2011 on Vimeo. It doesn't feature anyone from Young Money, but has appearances by T-Minus, Noah "40" Shebib, The Weeknd, Boi-1da and Kromatik. It was shot in Canada, mainly in Toronto, Drake's home town. No narrative is followed, yet Drake is depicted rapping in different environments : in the centre field of Toronto's Rogers Centre (as the stadium's scoreboard is lit up with the title of his November 15 album, Take Care); in front of a rundown building with the letters "OVOXO" (the name of Drake's crew: "October's Very Own" or "OVO" standing for Drake and "XO" standing for The Weeknd) sprayed in graffiti by 'Mer' on the wall; in the glass elevator of the C.N. Tower, going up, allowing few symbolic interpretations in relation to Drake's ascension to fame, the main topic of the song; at the head of a dining table, puffing on a cigar, Drake being dressed with an unprecedented retro as well as geeky style, with a knitted jumper and vintage half-tainted glasses; and most notably in front of Toronto's historic Guild Park, surrounded by his crew. The video shows obvious traces of sponsorship by Nike sportswear.

=== Critical reception ===
Overall the video for "Headlines" was received positively by most music critics. MTV commented on the video by saying "Headlines", like the previously released "Marvin's Room" video (also from Take Care), is set in Canada and gives a more intimate look into who the superstar rapper really is." Spin commented on the video by saying "the clip finally shows the perpetually conflicted star finally appearing to enjoy his success -- well, at least a little bit. Backed by imperial-style columns, standing in a vast but empty stadium, or chewing a stogie on the escalator at a high-rise office building, Drake looks every bit a leader, and he has a crew of solemn-faced men to back him up." Consequence of Sound commented by saying "if you want to smoke cigars while riding elevators and have posse meetups outside local monuments, Drake can show you the ropes. Most folks are lucky their name on a scoreboard for a birthday." Complex commented on the video by saying "Headlines takes us on a journey through Toronto: The city where he's from. Drizzy brings us high above ground level in the window-surrounded elevator of Toronto's CN Tower, to the Rogers Centre—home of the Toronto Blue Jays—and to the dinner table where he and his OVO crew puff fat cigars and sip expensive wines."

== Critical reception ==
The song received positive reviews. According to Spin, the song "finds Drake ruminating on the ups and downs of celebrity." Spin also called the production matching "Drake's defiant tone with a martial beat and heavy staccato strings." The Huffington Post compared "Headlines" to "Marvins Room" saying, "Whereas "Marvins Room" is more devastating, "Headlines" doesn't dwell so much in its despair, and has the kind of flash you would expect a song titled "Headlines" to have." The Baltimore Sun said the song has "buoyant, staccato synth line and Casio snares" and that "The beat calls for such a sing-song flow that few rappers could tackle it." Rolling Stone gave the song three stars out of five, saying that "The spare beat never takes off, and the hook is a slight thing, almost an afterthought – or maybe the clearest sign that even with booze, cynics and fame buzzing about, hip-hop's great hope isn't overeager to please."

== Chart performance ==
The song debuted on the Hot R&B/Hip-Hop Songs chart at number 98 and has since reached number two on the chart. The following week, it debuted at number 13 on the Billboard Hot 100. On the week of October 15, 2011 "Headlines" reached the top of the Hot Rap Songs chart which was his 10th time overall achieving this. With the ascension of "Headlines", Drake became the artist with the most number one's of all time on the chart; tied only with rappers Diddy and Ludacris. The single was eventually certified Diamond by the Recording Industry Association of America (RIAA) for sales of over ten million digital copies in the United States.

== Charts ==
=== Weekly charts ===
Chart (2011)	Peak position
Belgium (Ultratip Bubbling Under Wallonia)	32
Canada Hot 100 (Billboard)	18
France (SNEP)	75
Lebanon (Lebanese Top 20)	13
UK Singles (Official Charts)	57
UK Hip Hop/R&B (Official Charts)	18
US Billboard Hot 100	13
US Hot R&B/Hip-Hop Songs (Billboard)	2
US Pop Airplay (Billboard)	17
US Rhythmic Airplay (Billboard)	1

Chart (2025)	Peak position
Sweden (Sverigetopplistan)	88
UK Hip Hop/R&B (Official Charts)	10

=== Year-end charts ===
Chart (2011)	Position
US Billboard Hot 100	85
US Hot R&B/Hip-Hop Songs (Billboard)	33
US Rap Songs (Billboard)	14
US Rhythmic (Billboard)	32
Chart (2012)	Position
US Hot R&B/Hip-Hop Songs (Billboard)	52
US Rhythmic (Billboard)	46
US Ringtones (Billboard)	47

== Certifications ==
Region	Certification	Certified units/sales
Australia (ARIA)	2× Platinum	140,000^{‡}
Canada (Music Canada)	Platinum	80,000^{*}
Denmark (IFPI Danmark)	Gold	45,000^{‡}
United Kingdom (BPI)	2× Platinum	1,200,000^{‡}
United States (RIAA)	Diamond	10,000,000^{‡}
^{*} Sales figures based on certification alone.^{‡} Sales+streaming figures based on certification alone.

== Release history ==
Region	Date	Format
United States	August 9, 2011	Digital download, Urban, Rhythmic, Urban AC, Hot AC, Alternative, and Mainstream radio
United States	October 18, 2011	Mainstream radio Re-release
