= 40 (music producer) =

Canadian record producer (born 1983)

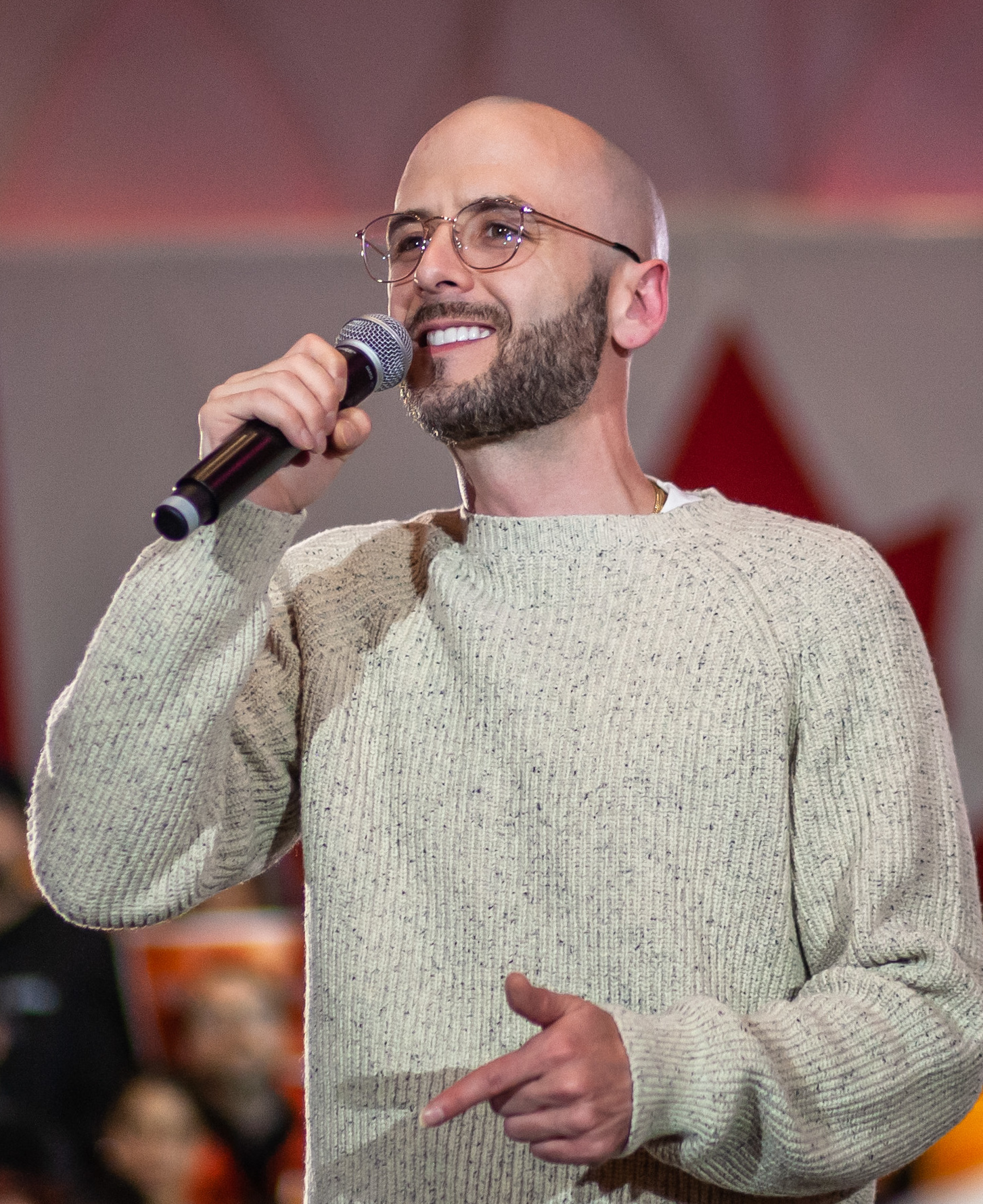
- 40 in 2019

Background information
- Born: Noah James Shebib; March 31, 1983 (age 43); Toronto, Ontario, Canada
- Genres: Hip-hop; R&B; downtempo
- Occupations: Record producer; songwriter; record executive; actor
- Years active: 1996–present
- Labels: OVO Sound; Warner Bros.
- Parents: Donald Shebib (father); Tedde Moore (mother)

Noah James Shebib (born March 31, 1983), better known by his stage name 40, is a Canadian record producer, songwriter, record executive, and former child actor from Toronto, Ontario. He is best known for his production work with fellow Toronto native Drake, having extensive involvement in the entirety of Drake's discography since 2008. Shebib's production style, often described as downtempo and ambient, has become synonymous with Drake's sound. His other production credits include Lil Wayne, Alicia Keys, Beyoncé, Action Bronson, and Jamie Foxx.

Shebib and Drake are two of the three co-founders of the OVO Sound label, which was launched as an imprint of Warner Records in 2012. Shebib has won two Grammy Awards from 20 nominations.

== Early life ==
Noah James Shebib is the son of Canadian film director Donald Shebib of Lebanese and Irish origin and actress Tedde Moore, who is known for appearing in the 1983 film A Christmas Story; she was pregnant with him during the production of that film. On his mother's side, he is the grandson of actor and educator Mavor Moore, the great-grandson of Canadian theatre figure Dora Mavor Moore, and the great-great-grandson of Scottish-born economist James Mavor. His father is of partial Irish descent. He has three older sisters, Zoe, Suzanna, and Chaunce. As a child he attended school at Royal St. George's College and Humberside Collegiate Institute.

== Acting career ==
Shebib began as a child actor, playing roles in television shows and films. His first role was in the 1994 sitcom The Mighty Jungle. He also played a consistent role on the Gemini Award-winning television series, Wind at My Back. His best-known role came in his teen years, when he was featured as one of the lead males in the critically acclaimed The Virgin Suicides. He also had smaller roles in The Last Don and Perfect Pie; the latter was his last movie before he retired from acting.

== Music career ==
Early in Noah's career, before he started crafting beats, he DJ'd under the name DJ Chilly and performed alongside MC Elite (Everett MacLean). Shebib eventually made the shift from DJ to music producer, working with local Toronto artists like Empire, Knamelis, Stolenowners, and Christopher Morales, and Saukrates. He earned the nickname "40 Days & 40 Nights" (which was later reduced to "40") early on in his career, as he would work in the studio throughout the night, with no sleep.

He began working with then Degrassi star Aubrey Graham (Drake) in 2005. He was shown producing with Drake (musician) on Degrassi Unscripted. When Shebib first started working with Drake, he was originally just a recording and mixing engineer, providing no songwriting or production input at all. However, after the third day of work, Shebib decided to build an exclusive relationship with Drake, proclaiming that they were "going to take over the world together."

Shebib's big break came in 2008, when he executive produced Drake's mixtape So Far Gone with Toronto-based producer, Boi-1da. He recorded and mixed every song off the mixtape, and also produced a few notable tracks such as "The Calm", "Houstatlantavegas", "Bria's Interlude" and "Successful", all of which ended up defining Drake's sound going forward. He also worked on Drake's debut album Thank Me Later, and second album Take Care. On the latter, Shebib co produced almost every song, alongside his usual duties of recording and mixing the entire album. Shebib also produced the song "I'm Single" from Lil Wayne's "No Ceilings" mixtape, "Un-Thinkable (I'm Ready)" for Alicia Keys and "Demonstrate" for JoJo.

Shebib, along with Drake and Oliver El-Khatib, founded the OVO record label in 2012. Music produced under the imprint is uploaded to the label's blog site for streaming, before the album is officially released. One example is the single "Marvins Room", which was first posted to the blog site five days after its conception, before it was even slated to be a single off the album. Recently Shebib has helped produce Drake's newer material, co producing the lead single "Started from the Bottom", among other records.

Shebib also worked on Drake's third album, Nothing Was the Same, his fourth studio album Views, and Scorpion.

== Production style ==
Shebib has been instrumental in creating Drake's music, and together their "atmospheric, brooding sound has shaped the landscape of hip hop moving forward." Shebib's production is described as "sparse, ambient, slow-jam-like tracks dominated by brooding synths, minimalist piano or guitar parts, stripped-down, often muffled drums, and cinematic atmospheric treatments." An example is the song "Marvins Room", where Shebib mixed the record so that it is "very dark and quiet and muddy and with the vocals cutting through like a razor" and is notorious for being heavy on the low end.

== Personal life ==
In 2005, at the age of 22, Shebib was diagnosed with multiple sclerosis. His personal story is prominently featured on the National Multiple Sclerosis Society website, where he outlines his experiences with the disease, hoping that by creating awareness and "improving connections and knowledge about MS, we can end the disease". His mother was also diagnosed with multiple sclerosis. During the last weeks of his father's life, he and Zella Wolofsky were his dad's primary caregivers. He was awarded an honorary Doctorate of Laws (LLD) from York University on October 12, 2022.

== Political activism ==
=== Palestine ===
In late 2023, Shebib was a signatory on the Artists4Ceasefire letter, a petition calling for a cessation of hostilities in Gaza by Israel. He has spoken about being "distraught" by the events in the region. In an interview with Rolling Stone MENA, he revealed that he personally got Drake to sign the letter as well. This action was noted for its significance, as Drake, who is Jewish, was one of the most prominent artists to sign the letter.

=== Lebanon ===
Shebib has also demonstrated support for Lebanon, his father's home country. Following the 2020 Beirut port explosion, the OVO fashion label, co-owned by Shebib, released a line of hoodies and T-shirts with all proceeds going to the Lebanese Red Cross to aid victims of the disaster. The apparel featured the OVO owl logo with the Lebanese flag embedded within it.

== Discography ==
=== Singles produced ===
List of singles as either producer, co-producer, songwriter or mixing engineer, with selected chart positions and certifications, showing year released, performing artists and album name
| Title | Year | Peak chart positions | | | | | | | | | | Certifications | Album |
| Title | Year | US | US R&B | US Rap | AUS | CAN | GER | IRL | NZ | SWI | UK | Certifications | Album |
|---|---|---|---|---|---|---|---|---|---|---|---|---|---|
| "Successful" (Drake featuring Trey Songz) | 2009 | 17 | 3 | 2 | — | — | — | — | — | — | — | RIAA: Platinum | So Far Gone and Ready |
| "I'm Single" (Lil Wayne) | 2010 | 82 | 38 | 23 | — | — | — | — | — | — | — | | I Am Not a Human Being |
| "Un-Thinkable (I'm Ready)" (Alicia Keys) | 2010 | 21 | 1 | — | — | — | — | — | — | — | — | RIAA: 2× Platinum | The Element of Freedom |
| "Miss Me" (Drake featuring Lil Wayne) | 2010 | 15 | 3 | 2 | — | 73 | — | — | — | — | — | RIAA: Platinum | Thank Me Later |
| "Fancy" (Drake featuring T.I. & Swizz Beatz) | 2010 | 25 | 4 | 1 | — | 54 | — | — | — | — | — | RIAA: Platinum | Thank Me Later |
| "Fall for Your Type" (Jamie Foxx featuring Drake) | 2010 | 50 | 1 | — | — | — | — | — | — | — | — | | Thank Me Later |
| "Over" (Drake) | 2010 | 14 | 2 | 1 | — | 17 | — | — | — | — | — | RIAA: 3× Platinum | Best Night of My Life |
| "I'm on One" (DJ Khaled featuring Drake, Rick Ross & Lil Wayne) | 2011 | 10 | 1 | 1 | — | 67 | — | — | — | — | 78 | RIAA: Gold | We the Best Forever |
| "Headlines" (Drake) | 2011 | 13 | 1 | 1 | — | 18 | — | — | — | — | 57 | BPI: Gold; MC: Platinum; RIAA: 4× Platinum | Take Care |
| "Still Got It" (Tyga featuring Drake) | 2011 | 89 | 70 | — | — | — | — | — | — | — | — | | Careless World: Rise of the Last King |
| "Take Care" (Drake featuring Rihanna) | 2012 | 7 | 26 | 2 | 9 | 15 | — | 18 | 7 | 50 | 9 | ARIA: 3× Platinum; BPI: 2× Platinum; MC: 2× Platinum; RIANZ: Platinum; RIAA: 5× Platinum | Take Care |
| "Enough Said" (Aaliyah featuring Drake) | 2012 | — | 55 | — | — | — | — | — | — | — | — | | —N/a |
| "Demonstrate" (JoJo) | 2012 | — | — | — | — | — | — | — | — | — | — | | —N/a |
| "Fuckin' Problems" (ASAP Rocky featuring Drake, 2 Chainz and Kendrick Lamar) | 2012 | 8 | 2 | 2 | 78 | 65 | 86 | — | — | 65 | 50 | ARIA: 3× Platinum; BVMI: Gold; BPI: Platinum; RIAA: 6× Platinum | Long. Live. ASAP |
| "No Lie " (2 Chainz featuring Drake) | 2012 | 24 | 1 | 1 | — | — | — | — | — | — | — | RIAA:3× Platinum | Based on a T.R.U. Story |
| "Started from the Bottom" (Drake) | 2013 | 6 | 2 | 2 | 93 | 36 | — | — | — | — | 25 | ARIA: Gold; BPI: Gold; MC: Platinum; RIAA: 6× Platinum | Nothing Was the Same |
| "No New Friends" (DJ Khaled featuring Drake, Rick Ross, & Lil Wayne) | 2013 | 37 | 9 | 8 | — | — | — | — | — | — | 106 | RIAA: Gold | Suffering from Success |
| "Hold On, We're Going Home" (Drake featuring Majid Jordan) | 2013 | 4 | 1 | — | 8 | 6 | 52 | 18 | 9 | 55 | 4 | ARIA: 2× Platinum; BPI: 2× Platinum; MC: Platinum; RIAA: 6× Platinum; RMNZ: Gold | Nothing Was the Same |
| "All Me" (Drake featuring 2 Chainz & Big Sean) | 2013 | 20 | 6 | 4 | — | 90 | — | — | — | — | 86 | RIAA: 2× Platinum | Nothing Was the Same |
| "Trophies" (Young Money featuring Drake) | 2014 | 50 | 13 | — | — | — | — | — | — | — | — | | Young Money: Rise of an Empire |
| "Actin Crazy" (Action Bronson) | 2015 | — | — | — | — | — | — | — | — | — | — | | Mr. Wonderful |
| "My Love" (Majid Jordan featuring Drake) | 2015 | — | — | — | — | — | — | — | — | — | — | | Majid Jordan |
| "Summer Sixteen" (Drake) | 2016 | 6 | 1 | 1 | 25 | 12 | 97 | 71 | 46 | 63 | 23 | BPI: Silver; RIAA: Platinum | —N/a |
| "Come and See Me" (PartyNextDoor featuring Drake) | 2016 | 55 | 21 | — | — | — | — | — | — | — | — | BPI: Silver; RIAA: 3× Platinum | P3 |
| "One Dance" (Drake featuring Wizkid and Kyla | 2016 | 1 | 1 | 1 | 1 | 1 | 1 | 1 | 1 | 1 | 1 | ARIA: 6× Platinum; BPI: 5× Platinum; IFPI: 3× Platinum; MC: Diamond; RIAA: 11× Platinum; RMNZ: 2× Platinum | Views |
| "Work" (Rihanna featuring Drake) | 2016 | 1 | 1 | — | 5 | 1 | — | 5 | 2 | 9 | 2 | ARIA: 2× Platinum; BPI: 2× Platinum; BVMI: Platinum; MC: Gold; RIAA: 8× Platinum; RMNZ: Platinum; SNEP: Diamond | Anti |
| "Glow" (Drake featuring Kanye West) | 2017 | 54 | 30 | — | — | 37 | — | 65 | 9 | — | 55 | | More Life |
| "Signs" | 2017 | 36 | 14 | — | 32 | 12 | — | 59 | 27 | 36 | 26 | MC: 2× Platinum; ARIA: Gold; BPI: Gold; RIAA: Platinum; SNEP: Gold | Non-album single |
| "Nice for What" (Drake) | 2018 | 1 | 1 | 1 | 1 | 1 | 9 | 2 | 1 | 7 | 1 | ARIA: 3× Platinum; BPI: 2× Platinum; IFPI: Gold; MC: 4× Platinum; RIAA: 5× Platinum; RMNZ: Platinum | Scorpion |
| "God's Plan" | 2018 | 1 | 1 | 1 | 1 | 1 | 2 | 1 | 1 | 1 | 1 | MC: 8× Platinum; ARIA: 5× Platinum; BPI: 3× Platinum; BVMI: Gold; RIAA: 11× Platinum; RMNZ: 2× Platinum; SNEP: Diamond | Scorpion |
| "Don't Matter to Me" (with Michael Jackson) | 2018 | 9 | 8 | — | 3 | 4 | — | 3 | 6 | 5 | 3 | MC: Gold; ARIA: Gold; BPI: Gold | Scorpion |
| "In My Feelings" | 2018 | 1 | 1 | 1 | 2 | 1 | — | 2 | 1 | 2 | 1 | MC: 5× Platinum; ARIA: 3× Platinum; BPI: Platinum; RIAA: 5× Platinum; RMNZ: Platinum; SNEP: Platinum | Scorpion |
| "No Guidance" (Chris Brown featuring Drake) | 2018 | 5 | 2 | — | 7 | 7 | — | 19 | 17 | 29 | 6 | MC: 3× Platinum; ARIA: 3× Platinum; BPI: Platinum; RIAA: 8× Platinum; RMNZ: Platinum | Indigo |
| "Money in the Grave" (featuring Rick Ross) | 2019 | 7 | 3 | 2 | 7 | 5 | — | 113 | 18 | 7 | 32 | ARIA: Gold; BPI: Silver; RMNZ: Gold; SNEP: Gold | The Best in the World Pack |
| "Toosie Slide" | 2020 | 1 | 1 | 1 | 3 | 2 | — | 1 | 1 | 2 | 1 | MC: 4× Platinum; ARIA: Platinum; BPI: Platinum; RMNZ: Platinum; SNEP: Gold | Dark Lane Demo Tapes |
| "Laugh Now Cry Later" (featuring Lil Durk) | 2020 | 2 | 2 | 1 | 1 | 3 | — | 5 | 3 | 4 | 3 | MC: 4× Platinum; BPI: Gold; RMNZ: Gold | Certified Lover Boy |
| "What's Next" | 2021 | 1 | 1 | 1 | 7 | 1 | 36 | 7 | 12 | 14 | 4 | MC: Platinum; RIAA: Platinum | Scary Hours 2 |
| "Wants and Needs" (featuring Lil Baby) | 2021 | 2 | 2 | 2 | 15 | 2 | 58 | 8 | 20 | 24 | 10 | RIAA: Gold | Scary Hours 2 |
| "Lemon Pepper Freestyle" (featuring Rick Ross) | 2021 | 3 | 3 | 3 | 26 | 3 | — | 11 | - | - | 6 | | Scary Hours 2 |
"—" denotes a recording that did not chart or was not released in that territory.

== Awards and nominations ==
=== Grammy Awards ===
The Grammy Awards are awarded annually by the National Academy of Recording Arts and Sciences.

| Year | Nominee / work | Award | Result |
|---|---|---|---|
| 2011 | Thank Me Later | Best Rap Album | Nominated |
| 2012 | Loud | Album of the Year | Nominated |
| 2013 | Take Care | Best Rap Album | Won |
| 2013 | "The Motto" | Best Rap Song | Nominated |
| 2014 | "Started from the Bottom" | Best Rap Song | Nominated |
| 2014 | "Fuckin' Problems (Explicit)" | Best Rap Song | Nominated |
| 2014 | Nothing Was the Same | Best Rap Album | Nominated |
| 2015 | "0 to 100 / The Catch Up" | Best Rap Song | Nominated |
| 2015 | Beyoncé | Album of the Year | Nominated |
| 2016 | If You're Reading This It's Too Late | Best Rap Album | Nominated |
| 2017 | Views | Album of the Year | Nominated |
| 2017 | "Work" (with Rihanna) | Record of the Year | Nominated |
| 2017 | "Come and See Me" | Best R&B Song | Nominated |
| 2019 | Scorpion | Album of the Year | Nominated |
| 2019 | "God's Plan" | Record of the Year | Nominated |
| 2019 | "God's Plan" | Song of the Year | Nominated |
| 2019 | "God's Plan" | Best Rap Song | Won |
| 2020 | "No Guidance" (with Chris Brown) | Best R&B Song | Nominated |
