= 40 production discography =

The following is a discography of production by 40.

== Singles produced ==
List of singles as either producer or co-producer, with selected chart positions and certifications, showing year released, performing artists and album name
Title	Year	Peak chart positions										Certifications	Album
Title	Year	US	US R&B	US Rap	AUS	CAN	GER	IRL	NZ	SWI	UK	Certifications	Album
"Successful" (Drake featuring Trey Songz)	2009	17	3	2	—	—	—	—	—	—	—	RIAA: Gold	So Far Gone and Ready
"I'm Single" (Lil Wayne)	2010	82	38	23	—	—	—	—	—	—	—		I Am Not a Human Being
"Un-Thinkable (I'm Ready)" (Alicia Keys)	2010	21	1	—	—	—	—	—	—	—	—		The Element of Freedom
"Miss Me" (Drake featuring Lil Wayne)	2010	15	3	2	—	73	—	—	—	—	—	RIAA: Gold	Thank Me Later
"Fancy" (Drake featuring T.I. & Swizz Beatz)	2010	25	4	1	—	54	—	—	—	—	—		Thank Me Later
"Fall for Your Type" (Jamie Foxx featuring Drake)	2010	50	1	—	—	—	—	—	—	—	—		Best Night of My Life
"I'm on One" (DJ Khaled featuring Drake, Rick Ross & Lil Wayne)	2011	10	1	1	—	67	—	—	—	—	78	RIAA: Gold	We the Best Forever
"Headlines" (Drake)	2011	13	1	1	—	18	—	—	—	—	57	MC: Platinum; RIAA: 3× Platinum	Take Care
"Still Got It" (Tyga featuring Drake)	2011	89	70	—	—	—	—	—	—	—	—		Careless World: Rise of the Last King
"Take Care" (Drake featuring Rihanna)	2012	7	26	2	9	15	—	18	7	50	9	ARIA: 2× Platinum; BPI: Gold; MC: 2× Platinum; RIANZ: Platinum; RIAA: 3× Platinum	Take Care
"Enough Said" (Aaliyah featuring Drake)	2012	—	55	—	—	—	—	—	—	—	—		—N/a
"Demonstrate" (JoJo)	2012	—	—	—	—	—	—	—	—	—	—		—N/a
"Fuckin' Problems" (ASAP Rocky featuring Drake, 2 Chainz & Kendrick Lamar)	2012	8	2	2	78	65	86	—	—	65	50	ARIA: Gold; RIAA: 2× Platinum	Long. Live. ASAP
"Started from the Bottom" (Drake)	2013	6	2	2	93	36	—	—	—	—	25	MC: Platinum; RIAA: 2× Platinum	Nothing Was the Same
"No New Friends" (DJ Khaled featuring Drake, Rick Ross & Lil Wayne)	2013	37	9	8	—	—	—	—	—	—	106	RIAA: Gold	Suffering from Success
"Hold On, We're Going Home" (Drake featuring Majid Jordan)	2013	4	1	—	8	6	52	18	9	55	4	ARIA: 2× Platinum; BPI: Gold; MC: Platinum; RIAA: 2× Platinum; RMNZ: Gold	Nothing Was the Same
"All Me" (Drake featuring 2 Chainz & Big Sean)	2013	20	6	4	—	90	—	—	—	—	86	RIAA: Gold	Nothing Was the Same
"Trophies" (Young Money featuring Drake)	2014	50	13	—	—	—	—	—	—	—	—		Young Money: Rise of an Empire
"Actin Crazy" (Action Bronson)	2015	—	—	—	—	—	—	—	—	—	—		Mr. Wonderful
"My Love" (Majid Jordan featuring Drake)	2015	—	—	—	—	—	—	—	—	—	—		Majid Jordan
"Summer Sixteen" (Drake)	2016	6	1	1	25	12	97	71	46	63	23		—N/a
"Come and See Me" (PartyNextDoor featuring Drake)	2016	—	—	—	—	—	—	—	—	—	—		P3
"One Dance" (Drake featuring Wizkid and Kyla)	2016	1	1	1	1	1	1	1	1	1	1		Views
"Glow" (Drake featuring Kanye West)	2017	54	30	—	—	37	—	65	9	—	55		More Life
"Nice for What" (Drake)	2018	1	1	1	1	1	9	2	1	7	1	ARIA: Platinum; BPI: Platinum; IFPI: Gold; MC: 3× Platinum; RIAA: 3× Platinum; RMNZ: Platinum	Scorpion
"—" denotes a recording that did not chart or was not released in that territory.

== 2002 ==
=== Empire - Runamuk: The Intro ===
- 01. "Intro"
- 02. "Walk On Y'all"
- 03. "Runamuk Rappers"
- 04. "Once Again From the Top"
- 05. "Buddah Session"
- 06. "I'm Pissed"
- 07. "Wack"
- 08. "Bonus - (Fatal Phonetics Diss)"

== 2005 ==
=== Divine Brown - Divine Brown ===
- 02. "Twist My Hair" (Produced with Divine Brown)
- 04. "Help Me" (Produced with Divine Brown)
- 08. "Another Affair" (Produced with Big Soxx)

== 2007 ==
=== JDiggz - Memoirs of a Playbwoy ===
- 07. "With You" (feat. George Nozuka)
- 10. "Come Home With Me" (feat. Cory Lee)
- 13. "With You (Remix)" (feat. Drake & George Nozuka)

=== Drake - Comeback Season ===
- 02. "The Presentation"
- 12. "Bitch is Crazy"

== 2009 ==
=== Drake - So Far Gone ===
- 01. "Lust For Life"
  - Sample Credit: "Ideas as Opiates" by Tears for Fears
- 02. "Houstatlantavegas"
- 03. "Successful" (feat. Trey Songz & Lil Wayne)
- 07. "A Night Off" (feat. Lloyd)
  - Sample Credit: "Between the Sheets" by The Isley Brothers
- 13. "Sooner than Later"
- 14. "Bria's Interlude" (feat. Omarion)
  - Sample Credit: "Friendly Skies" by Missy Elliott
- 15. "The Calm"

=== Trey Songz - Ready ===
- 12. "Successful" (feat. Drake)

=== Drake - So Far Gone ===
- 01. "Houstatlantavegas"
- 02. "Successful" (feat. Trey Songz & Lil Wayne)
- 06. "The Calm"

=== Lil Wayne - No Ceilings ===
- 20. "I'm Single" (produced with Omen)

=== Lloyd - Like Me: The Young Goldie EP ===
- 08. "A Night Off" (feat. Drake)
  - Sample Credit: "Between the Sheets" by The Isley Brothers

=== Alicia Keys - The Element of Freedom ===
- 07. "Un-Thinkable (I'm Ready)"

== 2010 ==
=== Drake - Thank Me Later ===
- 01. "Fireworks" (feat. Alicia Keys) (Produced with Boi-1da & Crada)
- 03. "The Resistance"
- 07. "Fancy" (feat. T.I. & Swizz Beatz) (Produced with Swizz Beatz)
  - Sample Credit: "I Don't Want To Play Around" by Ace Spectrum
- 08. "Shut It Down" (feat. The-Dream) (Produced with Omen)
- 09. "Unforgettable" (feat. Young Jeezy) (Produced with Boi-1da)
  - Sample Credit: "At Your Best (You Are Love)" by Aaliyah
- 10. "Light Up" (feat. Jay-Z) (Produced with Tone Mason)
- 11. "Miss Me" (feat. Lil Wayne) (Produced with Boi-1da)
  - Sample Credit: "Wild Flower" by Hank Crawford
- 12. "Cece's Interlude"

=== Trey Songz - Passion, Pain & Pleasure ===
- 15. "Unfortunate"
- 16. "Blind"

=== Lil Wayne - I Am Not a Human Being ===
- 05. "I'm Single" (Produced with Omen)

=== Jamie Foxx - Best Night of My Life ===
- 08. "Fall for Your Type" (feat. Drake) (Produced with Rico Love & Drake)

== 2011 ==
=== Jamie Drastik - Champagne And Cocaine ===
- 17. "I'm On One Freestyle"

=== Sade - The Ultimate Collection (Disc 2) ===
- 14. "The Moon and the Sky (Remix)" (feat. Jay-Z)

=== DJ Khaled - We the Best Forever ===
- 01. "I'm On One" (feat. Drake, Rick Ross & Lil Wayne) (Produced with T-Minus & Kromatik)

=== Drake - Take Care ===
- 01. "Over My Dead Body" (Produced with Chantal Kreviazuk)
  - Sample Credit: "Sailin' Da South" by DJ Screw
- 02. "Shot For Me"
  - Sample Credit: "Anything" by SWV
- 03. "Headlines" (Produced with Boi-1da)
- 04. "Crew Love" (feat. The Weeknd) (Produced with Illangelo & The Weeknd)
- 06. "Marvins Room"
- 07. "Buried Alive (Interlude)" (feat. Kendrick Lamar) (Produced with Supa Dups)
- 08. "Under Ground Kings" (Produced with T-Minus)
  - Sample Credit: "Farmers Pleasure" by Jah Cure
- 09. "We'll Be Fine" (feat. Birdman) (Produced with T-Minus)
- 12. "Cameras / Good Ones Go (Interlude)" ("Cameras" Produced with Drake)
  - Sample Credit: "Calling on You" by Jon B.
- 13. "Doing It Wrong"
- 14. "The Real Her" (feat. Lil Wayne & André 3000) (Produced with Drake)
- 15. "Look What You've Done" (Produced with Chase N. Cashe)
  - Sample Credit: "If U Scared, Say U Scared" by Playa
- 17. "Practice" (Produced with Drake)
  - Sample Credit: "Back That Azz Up" by Juvenile
- 20. "Hate Sleeping Alone" (Deluxe Edition Bonus Track)

== 2012 ==
=== Tyga - Careless World: Rise of the Last King ===
- 22. "Still Got It" (feat. Drake) (Produced with Supa Dups) (Deluxe Edition Bonus Track)

=== Melanie Fiona - The MF Life ===
- 04. "I Been That Girl" (Produced by T-Minus, Vocal Production by 40)

=== Usher - Looking 4 Myself ===
- 09. "What Happened to U" (Produced with Omen)
  - Sample Credit: "One More Chance" by The Notorious B.I.G.

=== Nas - Life Is Good ===
- 14. "Bye Baby" (Produced with Salaam Remi)
  - Sample Credit: "Goodbye Love" by Guy

=== 2 Chainz - Based on a T.R.U. Story ===
- 04. "No Lie" (feat. Drake) (Produced by Mike WiLL Made It, Co-Produced by Marz, Drake's Vocal Production by 40)

== 2013 ==
=== ASAP Rocky - Long. Live. ASAP ===
- 07. "Fuckin' Problems" (feat. Drake, 2 Chainz & Kendrick Lamar) (Produced with C. Papi)

=== Drake - Nothing Was the Same ===
- 01. "Tuscan Leather"
- 02. "Furthest Thing" (Co-Produced by Jake One)
- 03. "Started from the Bottom (Produced by Mike Zombie, Additional Production by 40)
- 04. "Wu-Tang Forever"
- 05. "Own It" (Produced by Detail, Additional Production by 40)
- 07. "From Time" (feat. Jhené Aiko) (Produced with Chilly Gonzales)
- 08. "Hold On, We're Going Home" (feat. Majid Jordan) (produced by Nineteen85 & Majid Jordan, Additional Production by 40)
- 09. "Connect" (Co-Produced by Hudson Mohawke)
- 14. "Come Thru"
- 15. "All Me" (feat. 2 Chainz & Big Sean) (produced by KeY Wane, Additional Production by 40)
- 16. "The Motion" (feat. Sampha) (produced by Sampha, additional production by 40)

=== DJ Khaled - Suffering from Success ===
- 09. "No New Friends" (feat. Drake, Rick Ross & Lil Wayne) (produced with Boi-1da)

=== Beyoncé - Beyoncé ===
- 09. "Mine" (feat. Drake) (additional production by Majid Jordan & Omen, vocal production by Beyoncé Knowles)

== 2014 ==
=== Young Money - Young Money: Rise of an Empire ===
- 02. "Trophies" (feat. Drake) (produced by Hit-Boy, co-produced by 40 & Hagler)

== 2015 ==
=== Action Bronson - Mr. Wonderful ===
- 04. "Actin Crazy" (produced with Omen)

=== Drake - If You're Reading This It's Too Late ===
- 06. "Madonna"
- 12. "6 Man" (Co-Produced by Daxz)
- 15. "You & the 6" (Produced by Boi-1da, Co-Produced by Illmind & 40)
- 16. "Jungle"

=== Drake & Future - What a Time to Be Alive ===
- 11. "30 for 30 Freestyle"

== 2016 ==
=== Majid Jordan - Majid Jordan ===
- 03. "My Love" (feat. Drake) (produced by Nineteen85 & Illangelo, co-produced by Majid Jordan & 40)

=== Drake - Views ===
- 2. "9" (produced with Boi-1da & Brian Alexander Morgan)
- 3. "U with Me?" (produced with Kanye West, DJ Dahi, Ricci Riera, Vinylz, OZ, and Axelfolie)
- 6. "Weston Road Flows" (produced with Stwo)
- 7. "Redemption" (produced with Di Genius & Jordan McClure)
- 9. "Faithful" (produced with Boi-1da & Nineteen85)
- 10. "Still Here" (produced with Daxz)
- 12. "One Dance" (featuring Wizkid and Kyla) (produced by Nineteen85, co-produced by 40 & Wizkid)
- 13. "Grammys" (featuring Future) (produced with Southside, Cardo, & Yung Exclusive)
- 14. "Child's Play" (additional production by Metro Boomin, Majid Jordan & Nineteen85)
- 18. "Fire & Desire"

=== PartyNextDoor - PartyNextDoor 3 ===
- 15. "Come and See Me" (featuring Drake)

== 2017 ==
=== Drake - More Life ===
- 4. "Jorja Interlude"
- 5. "Get It Together" (featuring Black Coffee and Jorja Smith) (Produced by Nineteen85 & Stwo with additional production from 40)
- 16. "Lose You" (Co-produced with Stwo)
- 18. "Glow" (featuring Kanye West) (Co-produced with Kanye West with additional production from Goldstein)
- 19. "Since Way Back" (featuring PartyNextDoor) (Co-produced with G. Ry, PartyNextDoor, and M3rge, with additional production from TOPFLR)
- 22. "Do Not Disturb" (Produced by Boi-1da and Ritter with additional production from 40)

== 2018 ==
=== Drake - Scorpion ===
==== A Side ====
- 1. "Survival" (Produced by No I.D. with additional production from 40)
- 4. "Emotionless" (Co-produced with No I.D. with additional production from The 25th Hour)
- 5. "God's Plan" (Produced by Cardo, Yung Exclusive, & Boi-1da, with additional production from 40)

==== B Side ====
- 1. "Peak"
- 2. "Summer Games" (Co-Produced with No I.D.)
- 4. "Nice for What" (Produced by Murda Beatz & Blaqnmild, with additional production from 40 & Corey Litwin)
- 9. "In My Feelings" (Produced by TrapMoneyBenny & Blaqnmild with additional production from 40)
- 10. "Don't Matter to Me" (with Michael Jackson) (Co-Produced with Nineteen85)
- 11. "After Dark" (featuring Static Major and Ty Dolla Sign) (Co-Produced with Capo & Shaun Harris with additional production from Static Major)
- 12. "Final Fantasy" (Co-Produced with Boi-1da & Sweet)

== 2020 ==
=== Drake - Dark Lane Demo Tapes ===
- 1. "Deep Pockets" (Co-Produced with Plain Pat)
- 12. "From Florida With Love" (Co-Produced with MexikoDro)

== 2021 ==
=== Drake - Certified Lover Boy ===
- 1. "Champagne Poetry" (Co-Produced with J.L.L, Masego, Maneesh, and Shlohmo)
- 4. "In The Bible" (featuring Lil Durk and Giveon) (Co-Produced with Leon Thomas III, Eli Brown, & Austin Powerz)
- 9. "N 2 Deep" (Co-Produced with Harley Arsanault, Kid Masterpiece, Alex Lustig, and Noel Cadastre)
- 11. "Yebba's Heartbreak" (with Yebba) (Co-Produced with Yebba & James Francies)
- 15. "Race My Mind" (Co-Produced with Monsune and Govi)
- 16. "Fountains" (featuring Tems) (Co-Produced with Monsune and Tresor)
- 17. "Get Along Better" (featuring Ty Dolla Sign) (Co-Produced with Nineteen85 and Noel Cadastre)
- 20. "Fucking Fans" (Produced with PartyNextDoor and Noel Cadastre, with additional production by 40 and Aliby)
- 21. "The Remorse"

== 2022 ==
=== Drake - Honestly, Nevermind ===
- 4. "Currents" (Produced by Black Coffee & Gordo with additional production by 40)
- 10. "Overdrive" (Co-Produced with Black Coffee)
- 11. "Down Hill"

=== Drake & 21 Savage - Her Loss ===
- 5. "Privileged Rappers" (additional production by 40)
- 6. "Spin Bout U" (additional production by 40)
- 7. "Hours in Silence" (Co-Produced with Nyan Lieberthal, Cole McEvoy-Morie, Noel Cadastre, and Daniel East)
- 9. "Circo Loco" (Produced by Boi-1da & Tay Keith with additional production by 40)
- 13. "Jumbotron Shit Poppin" (Produced by F1lthy, Cubeatz, Lil Yachty, Oogie Mane, and Sad Pony, with additional production by 40)
- 15. "3AM on Glenwood" (Co-Produced with Oz and Peter Iskander)

== 2023 ==
=== Drake - For All The Dogs ===
- 1. "Virginia Beach" (Co-Produced with Harley Arsenault)
- 3. "Calling For You" (featuring 21 Savage) (Co-Produced with LIl Yachty, Gent!, Cash Cobain, PoWRTrav, and JayStolaa)
- 9. "Slime You Out" (featuring SZA) (Co-Produced with Drake & Noel Cadastre with additional production from 40)
- 11. "Tried Our Best" (Co-Produced with Jahaan Sweet)
- 13. "Drew a Picasso" (Co-Produced with Dnny Phntm, Sauceboy, TheBoyKam, Tommy Parker, Young Troy, Eli Brown)
- 14. "Members Only" (featuring PartyNextDoor) (Co-Produced with Stwo)
- 23. "Polar Opposites" (Produced by Lil Yachty, Gent!, Antoine Walters, Bangs, and Beatmenace, with additional production by 40)

=== Roy Woods - MIXED EMOTIONS ===
- 11. "Don't Mind Me

=== Naomi Sharon - Obsidian ===
5. "Celestial" (Co-Produced with Alex Lustig)

== Uncertified ==
- 2010: Drake - "I Get Lonely Too"
- 2011: Drake - "Dreams Money Can Buy"
  - Sample Credit: "BTSTU" by Jai Paul
- 2011: Drake - "Trust Issues" (Produced with Adrian X)
- 2011: Drake - "Club Paradise"
- 2011: Drake - "Free Spirit" (feat. Rick Ross)
  - Sample Credit: "I Will Be Your Friend" by Sade
- 2012: Riz - "Waiting Up" (feat. Drake)
- 2012: JoJo - "Demonstrate"
- 2012: Aaliyah - "Enough Said" (feat. Drake)
- 2013: Eric Bellinger - "Ex Again" (feat. Jhené Aiko)
- 2013: Drake - "Girls Love Beyoncé" (feat. James Fauntleroy)
- 2014: Drake - "Days In The East" (Produced by PARTYNEXTDOOR, Co-produced by 40)
- 2014: Drake - "0 to 100 / The Catch Up" (Produced by Boi-1da, Co-produced by 40 & Nineteen85)
- 2018: Pvrx - "Mixed by 40"
