= Dre discography =

This is the discography of the producer/rapper Dre, who is known for being part of the hip hop production duo Cool & Dre.

== Featured singles ==
- 2007: "Lights Get Low" (Freeway feat. Dre and Rick Ross)
- 2007: "100 Million" (Birdman feat. Rick Ross, Dre, Young Jeezy, Lil Wayne & DJ Khaled)
- 2008: "Ain't Sayin' Nothin'" (Fat Joe feat. Dre & Plies)
- 2009: "Hot Revolver" (Lil Wayne feat. Dre)

== Guest appearances ==
- 2004: "Take Me Home" (Terror Squad feat. Dre)
- 2004: "Let Them Things Go" (Terror Squad feat. Dre & Young Selah)
- 2005: "Girl I'm a Bad Boy" (Fat Joe feat. P. Diddy & Dre)
- 2005: "Sum Mo" (Trina feat. Dre)
- 2005: "Lil Mama" (Trina feat. Dre)
- 2006: "Drop Ya Body" (Tony Sunshine feat. Dre)
- 2006: "So Amazing" (Christina Milian feat. Dre)
- 2006: "Hot Boy" (Christina Milian feat. Dre)
- 2006: "Movement" (DJ Khaled feat. Dre)
- 2006: "Blow" (Rick Ross feat. Dre)
- 2006: "Boss" (Rick Ross feat. Dre)
- 2007: "Flossin" (Majic feat. Dre)
- 2007: "Just Relax" (Joe feat. Dre)
- 2007: "Stop Blockin" (Luc Duc feat. Dre & Scruface)
- 2007: "Brown Paper Bag" (DJ Khaled feat. Young Jeezy, Dre, Juelz Santana, Rick Ross, Fat Joe & Lil Wayne)
- 2007: "I'm From the Ghetto" (DJ Khaled feat. Dre, The Game, Jadakiss & Trick Daddy)
- 2007: "B*tch I'm From Dade County" (DJ Khaled feat. Trick Daddy, Trina, Rick Ross, Brisco, Flo Rida, C-Ride & Dre)
- 2007: "Choppers" (DJ Khaled feat. Dre, Joe Hound & C-Ride)
- 2007: "Everywhere We Go" (Sean P feat. DJ Khaled & Dre)
- 2008: "Trilla" (Rick Ross feat. Dre)
- 2008: "I'm Rollin" (Rome feat. Rick Ross, C-Ride, Dre & Joe Hound)
- 2008: "She Can Get It" (Rocko feat. Dre)
- 2008: "They Hate Me Man" (K.A.R. Mafia feat. Dre & DJ Khaled)
- 2008: "Dont Play Me Dirty" (Junior Reid feat. Dre)
- 2008: "Eyes Open" (Yung Ralph feat. Dre)
- 2008: "A Girl" (David Banner feat. Dre)
- 2008: "Feelin Like A Pimp" (Git Fresh feat. Dre)
- 2008: "Golden Girl" (Chris Brown feat. Dre)
- 2008: "Ghetto" (Ace Hood feat. Dre)
- 2008: "Don't Tell Me It's Over" (Gym Class Heroes feat. Dre & Lil' Wayne)
- 2008: "Home" (Gym Class Heroes feat. Dre)
- 2008: "The Crackhouse" (Fat Joe feat. Dre & Lil Wayne)
- 2008: "Red Rum" (Lil Wayne feat. Dre)
- 2009: "Hot Revolver" (Lil Wayne feat. Dre)
- 2009: "Erased" (Dre feat. Chris Brown)
- 2010: "Realest They Come" (Lil Wayne feat. Dre & Tity Boi)
