= I Am Not a Human Being (song) =

2010 song by Lil Wayne

Song by Lil Wayne

from the album I Am Not a Human Being
- Released: September 27, 2010
- Genre: Hip-hop; rap rock
- Length: 4:05
- Label: Young Money; Cash Money; Universal Motown
- Songwriters: Dwayne Carter; Drew Correa; Marco Rodriguez-Diaz
- Producer: Drew Correa

Music video
- "I Am Not a Human Being" on YouTube

"I Am Not a Human Being" is the title track of Lil Wayne's 2010 album I Am Not a Human Being, which was released while the rapper was incarcerated.

== Background and themes ==
According to Vice, the song reflects Wayne's self-image, with the phrase "I Am Not a Human Being" used to express the persona he was projecting at the time. The song and its accompanying video were produced before Wayne began serving his prison sentence, though the video was released while he was incarcerated at Rikers Island.

== Composition and lyrics ==
Vice wrote that the track marked Wayne's return to rap after Rebirth, blending hip-hop with heavy guitar elements, and introducing a "rock star alien" persona through prankish imagery and wordplay. Entertainment Weekly described the song as having an angry tone, combining humorous similes and tough-talk lyrics with punk-hop-style guitar riffs.

Contactmusic described the song as rocky and experimental, with heavy bass, and noted it as a surprising stylistic departure from the rest of the album. The Line of Best Fit wrote that the song uses a beat inspired by Jay-Z's "99 Problems" and places emphasis on Wayne's "weird" persona, which some critics found grating.

According to Consequence of Sound, the song draws on the rock approach Wayne used on Rebirth, featuring a menacing guitar and a solid hook alongside non-rock vocal elements. RapReviews noted that the song includes a partial guitar riff and incorporates rock elements similar to Rebirth, and regarded it as stronger than most tracks from that album.

Beats Per Minute also described the track as rock-infused, noting the presence of a guitar riff but stating that it lacked impact. The AV Club similarly characterized the song as a continuation of Wayne's rock-oriented style from Rebirth.

== Critical reception ==
Entertainment Weekly wrote that the song's punk-hop guitar riffs compared poorly to those on Wayne's rock album Rebirth. Contactmusic described the song's rocky, experimental style as a surprising departure from Wayne's usual sound, while The Line of Best Fit identified it as the weakest track on the album. Consequence of Sound considered it the most radio-ready track on the album. RapReviews regarded the song as one of the stronger tracks when compared with Wayne's earlier rock-leaning material on Rebirth. Beats Per Minute described the production as uncertain, noting that the guitar riff lacked impact. The AV Club viewed the track as derivative of Wayne's earlier rock-oriented work and less effective than his previous experiments in the genre. Rolling Stone described the song as a power-chord-driven rock rap track.

== Legacy ==
Vice stated that the song has been seen as a turning point in Wayne's public persona, helping to establish his "alien" or otherworldly image.

== Music video ==
Rolling Stone noted that the video features Wayne displaying tattoos that are visible only under ultraviolet light.Pitchfork reported that the video appeared to be an unfinished or leaked version, showing Wayne performing amid zoned-out visual effects and similarly displaying glow-in-the-dark black-light tattoos.

== Personnel ==
- Lil Wayne – vocals, songwriter
- Drew Correa – producer, songwriter
- Marco Rodriguez-Diaz – songwriter

== Charts ==
Chart (2010)	Peak position
US Billboard Hot 100	65
