= Prom Queen (Lil Wayne song) =

Single by Lil Wayne

from the album Rebirth
- Released: January 27, 2009
- Recorded: 2008
- Genre: Rap rock
- Length: 3:41
- Label: Young Money; Cash Money; Universal Motown
- Songwriters: Dwayne Carter; Shanell Woodgett
- Producers: DJ Infamous; Drew Correa

Lil Wayne singles chronology
"Unstoppable" (2009)	"Prom Queen" (2009)	"So Good" (2009)

Music video
- "Prom Queen" on YouTube

"Prom Queen" is the lead single from Lil Wayne's album, Rebirth. The track is produced by Infamous and Andrew "Drew" Correa. The song is written by and contains backing vocals from Shanell Woodgett. The song made its official debut on January 27, appearing on Lil Wayne's MySpace page. The following day, "Prom Queen" was made available for purchase on all online music stores and Lil Wayne performed the single live for the first time during a concert in San Diego, which was streamed live on AT&T's FREEdom of Choice and Mobile Music Facebook pages that evening. The song features the Auto-Tune effect.

== Musical style ==
"Prom Queen" is a rap rock song, featuring "mall-metal riffage" and Auto-Tuned vocals. The song also incorporates elements from emo, grunge and late-'90s rap-rock.

== Music video ==
The music video premiered on Jimmy Kimmel Live!. The music video is about a young, high schooler Lil Wayne falling in love with a girl at school, but she denies him for someone else when she became prom queen. As they both age, Wayne becomes famous, while the girl becomes pregnant with the baby of her boyfriend who has left her. Wayne records the song "Prom Queen" as newspaper clippings of his life come up, such as his awards at the 2009 Grammy Awards and the major success of his album Tha Carter III. Later, Wayne performs with a Gibson Dark Fire guitar at a concert; Young Money artist Shanell Woodgett, who wrote the song, is also seen together with Wayne. During the concert, the girl who shunned Wayne in high school makes her way to the stage. When she reaches her hand out, hoping for Wayne to remember her, Wayne does remember her, and what she did to him; as a result, Wayne turns around just as they are about to touch hands, showing the girl how it felt when she did the same to him. At the end of the video, Wayne and Shanell are seen at the high school gym; they kiss and leave silently.

The video also features the members of nu metal band Korn as Wayne's backup band, as well as Young Money artist Shanell Woodgett and her younger sister, Danity Kane member D. Woods.

The video has directed by Dave Meyers.

== Chart performance ==
"Prom Queen" started to make an impact on the charts in early February. It made a "Hot Shot Debut" at number 17 on the Billboard Hot 100 based on downloads in the US and rose to number 15 the next week, also a "Hot Shot Debut" at number 26 on the Pop 100 and rose to number 22 the next week, and also charted at number 16 on the Bubbling Under R&B/Hip-Hop Singles. In Canada it also made a "Hot Shot Debut" at number 71 on the Canadian Hot 100 also based on downloads and skyrocketed up to number 36 the next week.

=== Charts ===
Chart performance for "Prom Queen"
Chart (2009)	Peak position
Australia (ARIA)	93
Australia Urban (ARIA)	10
Canada (Canadian Hot 100)	36
US Billboard Hot 100	15
US Billboard R&B/Hip-Hop Songs	16
US Billboard Pop 100	22

== Certifications ==
Certifications for "Prom Queen"
Region	Certification	Certified units/sales
United States (RIAA)	Platinum	1,000,000^{‡}
^{‡} Sales+streaming figures based on certification alone.

== Release history ==
Region	Date	Format(s)	Label	Ref.
United States	January 28, 2009	Digital download	Cash Money, Universal Motown	
United States	February 3, 2009	Contemporary hit radio	Cash Money, Universal Motown	
