= On Fire (Lil Wayne song) =

Single by Lil Wayne

from the album Rebirth
- A-side: "On Fire"
- B-side: "Da Da Da"
- Released: December 3, 2009
- Recorded: 2009
- Genre: Synth-rock
- Length: 4:08
- Label: Young Money; Cash Money; Universal Motown
- Songwriters: D. Carter; A. Lyon; M. Valenzano; E. Montilla; G. Moroder; P. Bellotte
- Producer: Cool & Dre

Lil Wayne singles chronology
"I'm Goin' In" (2009)	"On Fire" (2009)	"4 My Town (Play Ball)" (2009)

"On Fire" is a song performed by rapper Lil Wayne. The song is taken from Lil Wayne's seventh studio album Rebirth. It was released as the album's second single on December 3, 2009.

== Background ==
The song contains allusions from Amy Holland's song "She's on Fire" and was inspired in its entirety by Scarface.

== Music video ==
The music video was shot on December 10, 2009 by Chris Robinson. It was released on January 6, 2010. The music video begins with a shot of a mansion that is overlooked by storm clouds, to set the mood of the music video in a darker tone. A lady is then shown sitting on the lawn holding a white rabbit that quickly changes to a black rabbit. A black feather then drops on the ground giving a loud thud to were the video then cuts to Lil Wayne for the first time sitting down with his guitar alone in a room filled with recording equipment. Wayne gets up to start a recorder and starts to play his guitar which causes the music to start playing in the video. The scene then cuts back and forth to Lil Wayne entering a party filled with women. Wayne then starts to flirt with a lady who is shown as a dark angel with black wings and is shown sparking every time Lil Wayne touches her. Wayne is then shown performing with a rock group to the song with clips of the dark angel dancing. In a seductive scene, Wayne is shown lying down shirtless while the dark angel caresses his body and clips of a snake hissing at the camera interfere with the scene. Small clips of Birdman are then shown as the music video ends with Lil Wayne sitting back down with his guitar, alone in the room from the first scene. Also, Mariah Watchman is featured in this video.

== Charts ==
Chart (2009–2010)	Peak position
UK Hip Hop/R&B (Official Charts)	40
UK Singles (OCC)	131
US Billboard Hot 100	62
US Hot R&B/Hip-Hop Songs (Billboard)	54
US Hot Rap Songs (Billboard)	25
