= Gonorrhea (song) =

Promotional single by Lil Wayne featuring Drake

from the album I Am Not a Human Being
- Released: September 27, 2010
- Recorded: 2010
- Genre: Hip hop
- Length: 4:22
- Label: Young Money; Cash Money; Universal Republic
- Songwriters: Dwayne Carter, Jr.; Aubrey Graham; Daniel Johnson; Hide
- Producers: Kane Beatz; Filthy (co.)

Audio video
- "Gonorrhea" on YouTube

"Gonorrhea" is a promotional single by American rapper Lil Wayne featuring Young Money signee Drake, from his eighth studio album, I Am Not a Human Being. Upon the release of I Am Not a Human Being it debuted at number 17 on the US Hot 100.

It was certified Gold by the RIAA on March 16, 2012 for selling 500,000 digital copies.

== Chart performance ==
Chart (2010)	Peak position
Canada (Canadian Hot 100)	86
US Billboard Hot 100	17

== Certifications ==
Region	Certification	Certified units/sales
United States (RIAA)	Gold	500,000^{*}
^{*} Sales figures based on certification alone.
