= Chad Crawford =

American television host

Chad Crawford is the host of How to do Florida with Chad Crawford, a television and multimedia program. Crawford is from Seminole County, Florida, and graduated from Full Sail University. He is married to Kristy Crawford. The couple mortgaged their house to establish Crawford Entertainment. How to do Florida entered its 8th season in 2017 and visits sights and showcases activities across Florida from Ocala's caves to grouper fishing on the Gulf of Mexico. During its third season the program drew an estimated 14 million viewers. He has been working on the documentary series Protect Our Paradise that debuted in 2024.

He was born in Sanford, Florida. He joined the U.S. Navy at age 19 and lived in Antigua. He studied video and film at Full Sail University using the G.I. Bill. He lives in Lake Mary, Florida, with his wife and four children.
