= Shanell =

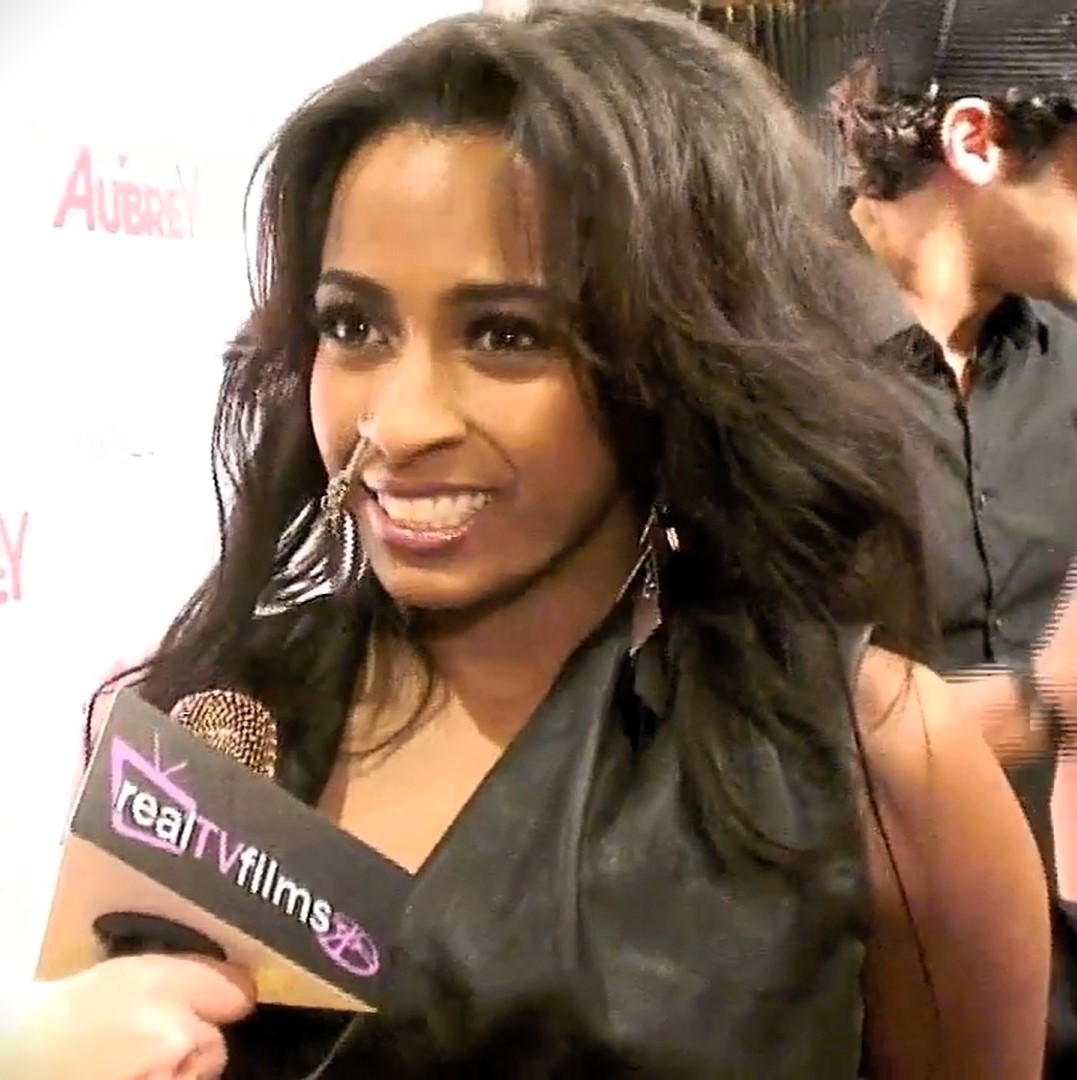
- Shanell in 2011

Background information
- Also known as: SnL; Zipp
- Born: Shanell Lynn Woodgett; November 15, 1980 (age 45); Anaheim, California, U.S.
- Origin: Atlanta, Georgia, U.S.
- Genres: Hip hop; R&B
- Occupation: Singer-songwriter
- Instrument: Vocals
- Years active: 2007–present
- Labels: Young Money; Cash Money; Republic
- Website: www.iamshanell.com

Shanell Lynn Woodgett (born November 15, 1980) is an American singer-songwriter from Atlanta, Georgia. She is best known for her guest appearance on Lil Wayne's 2009 single "Prom Queen", which peaked within the top 20 of the Billboard Hot 100. The year prior, she signed with Wayne's Young Money Entertainment, a then-imprint of Birdman's Cash Money Records and Universal Republic Records.

== Biography ==
Born in Anaheim, Shanell was raised in Atlanta and is the older sister of recording artist D. Woods. Her introduction to music was from her father, a Merrill Lynch Financial Advisor. A classically trained dancer in the disciplines of Jazz, ballet and modern dance, she began her career as a music video dancer for artists like Ciara. Dancing by day, Shanell penned songs by night to production from Iowa producer and friend Bangladesh, garnering a name for herself as a songwriter.

As a principal dancer for Ne-Yo, who later signed her to his publishing company, Shanell headed out on tour where she continued to record and hone her writing skills, penning songs for Danity Kane, Ne-Yo, Melanie Fiona, Kelis and Jennifer Hudson. She was introduced to Lil Wayne, who offered her a slot on his Young Money Entertainment roster, creative control of her projects, and the opportunity to join him on stage during his I Am Music Tour. Shanell was also on the 40-city I Am Music II Tour with Lil Boo, Lloyd, Kidd Kidd, Kevin Kev and Big Dawg Movement which started in Hartford, CT July 13, 2011 and ended in Woodlands, TX September 11, 2011.

Most recently, Shanell released a visual for "Boy Stop Playin'" in January 2014, which was included on her June 2013 EP Midnight Mimosas.

== Discography ==
=== Extended Plays ===
List of EPs, with year released
| Title | EP details |
|---|---|
| 4 Christmas | Released: December 18, 2015; Format: digital download |
| Mixed Emotions | Released: November 15, 2020; Format: digital download |

=== Compilation albums ===
List of albums, with selected chart positions
| Title | Album details | Peak chart positions | | | Certifications |
| Title | Album details | US | US R&B | US Rap | Certifications |
|---|---|---|---|---|---|
| We Are Young Money | Released: December 21, 2009; Label: Young Money, Cash Money; Format: CD, digital download | 9 | 3 | 1 | RIAA: Gold |
| Young Money: Rise of an Empire | Released: March 11, 2014 (US); Label: Young Money, Cash Money, Republic; Formats: CD, digital download | 7 | 4 | 2 | |
"—" denotes a recording that did not chart or was not released in that territory.

=== Mixtapes ===
List of mixtapes, with year released
| Title | Album details |
|---|---|
| A Taste of Shanell aka Snl | Released: August 13, 2009; Label: Young Money; Format: digital download |
| Shut Up and Listen | Released: March 3, 2010; Label: Young Money; Format: digital download |
| Nobody's Bitch | Released: September 2012; Label: YMCMB; Format: digital download |
| Midnight Mimosas | Released: June 4, 2013; Label: YMCMB; Format: digital download |
| Nobody's Bitch 2 | Released: July 22, 2014; Label: YMCMB; Format: digital download |
| 88 Keyz | Released: January 19, 2016; Label: Young Money; Format: digital download |

=== Singles ===
==== As lead artist ====
| Year | Title | Album |
|---|---|---|
| 2011 | "My Button" | Non-album song |
| 2012 | "So Good" (featuring Lil Wayne and Drake) | Midnight Mimosas |
| 2012 | "Last Time" (featuring Busta Rhymes) | Nobody's Bitch |
| 2014 | "Catch Me at the Light" (featuring Yo Gotti) | Young Money: Rise of an Empire |
| 2014 | "Hittin Like" (featuring Chanel West Coast) | Young Money: Rise of an Empire |
| 2015 | I Can Be Your Stripper" | TBA |

==== As featured artist ====
List of singles, with selected chart positions
| Year | Title | Peak chart positions | | | | Album | |
| Year | Title | US | US R&B | US Pop 100 | CAN | Album | |
|---|---|---|---|---|---|---|---|
| 2009 | "Prom Queen" (Lil Wayne featuring Shanell) | 15 | 16 | 22 | 36 | Rebirth | |
| 2010 | "Lipstick Diva" (Muff Mommy featuring Shanell) | – | – | – | – | Non-album single | "—" denotes releases that did not chart or receive certification. |
| 2015 | "Together Whatever" (Lucky Nick featuring Shanell) | – | – | – | – | Non-album single | |

=== Guest appearances ===
List of non-single guest appearances, with other performing artists, showing year released and album name
| Title | Year | Other artist(s) | Album |
|---|---|---|---|
| "My Weezy" | 2008 | Lil Wayne, Lil Twist, Tyga | Dedication 3 |
| "Runnin" | 2009 | Lil Wayne | Rebirth |
| "American Star" | 2009 | Lil Wayne | Rebirth |
| "I'm So Over You" | 2009 | Lil Wayne | Rebirth |
| "Wayne On Me" | 2009 | Lil Wayne | No Ceilings |
| "That's All I Have" | 2009 | Lil Wayne, Tyga | No Ceilings |
| "Skit 2" | 2009 | None | No Ceilings |
| "Handstand" | 2009 | Nicki Minaj | Beam Me Up Scotty |
| "What a Girl | 2009 | Gudda Gudda | Guddaville |
| "Sacrifice" | 2009 | Gudda Gudda, Lil Wayne, Mack Maine | Guddaville |
| "Show Me Something New" | 2009 | Jae Millz | The Virgo Mixtape: "He Nasty" |
| "Callin' Out" | 2010 | Gudda Gudda | Back 2 Guddaville |
| "Tell Me (Remix)" | 2010 | Jae Millz | The Flood Continues |
| "Can't Nobody" | 2011 | New Boyz | Too Cool to Care |
| "Rather Be" | 2011 | Benny Benassi | Electroman |
| "Kandle Light and Roses" | 2011 | Blaqstarr | Blaqstarr The Mixtape |
| "Cha-Ching" | 2012 | Millionaires | #YourGirlDoesParty |
| "Motivations" | 2013 | Quez | Black Boe Knows 2 |
| "She Wanna Ride" | 2014 | Cash Out | Let's Get It |
| "Check" | 2014 | Gucci Mane | The Return Of Mr. Perfect |
| "Admit It" | 2015 | Lil Wayne | Sorry 4 the Wait 2 |
| "Duck" | 2015 | Lil Wayne, Jae Millz, Gudda Gudda | No Ceilings 2 |

Shanell released “That’s All I Have” under the artist name “Zipp” on streaming platforms.
