= Omen (music producer) =

American record producer (1976–2025)

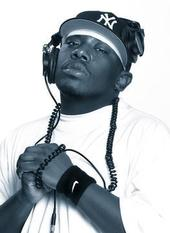

Background information
- Also known as: Omen
- Born: Sidney Brown; August 21, 1976
- Origin: New York City, U.S.
- Died: September 13, 2025 (aged 49) New York City, U.S.
- Genres: Hip hop, R&B
- Occupation: Record producer
- Instruments: Keyboard, drum machine, sampler
- Years active: 1999–2025
- Labels: Elaborate Musik Recordings / Weerai Music Company, LLC
- Website: Official Twitter

Sidney Brown (August 21, 1976 – September 2025), known professionally as Omen, was an American record producer from Harlem, New York. Renowned for his versatile production style, he worked across hip hop, R&B, and soul, contributing to the sound of some of the most prominent artists of his era.

Omen collaborated with a wide range of performers, producing music for Drake, Beyoncé, Usher, Action Bronson, Lil Wayne, Ludacris, Fabolous, Vado, Memphis Bleek, Redman, Keith Murray, Immortal Technique, and Amil among others. His work was recognized for blending sharp lyrical backdrops with rich instrumentation, making him a respected figure both in mainstream music and in underground circles.

Beyond his production credits, Omen was admired for his ability to nurture creativity in the artists he worked with, often serving as a bridge between commercial accessibility and authentic artistry. His influence extended throughout the music industry, and his contributions left an enduring impact on hip hop and contemporary music.

== Early life and career ==
Brown was born on August 21, 1976, in Harlem, New York City.

Omen's production was featured on early Roc-A-Fella releases by Memphis Bleek and Amil. Omen produced "Everybody" from Memphis Bleek's debut album Coming of Age and "No 1 Can Compare" from Amil's debut album All Money Is Legal.

Further placements included "Change You or Change Me" and "Why Wouldn't I" from Fabolous's Street Dreams, "Taste This" from Mýa's Moodring, and "Swagga Back" from Keith Murray's Def Jam debut He's Keith Murray.

Omen also provided the entire score for the Roc-A-Fella/Universal Pictures release Paper Soldiers in 2002.

== Commercial breakthrough and Grammy Award ==
In 2006, Omen produced "Tell It Like It Is" for Ludacris, which appeared on Ludacris' album Release Therapy. The album won the 2007 Grammy Award for Best Rap Album, earning Omen his first Grammy award.

Omen was also featured on Redman's Red Gone Wild album, producing the song "Soopaman Luva 6" which featured Hurricane G.

== Drake collaborations ==
Through Omen's collaborations with Canadian music producer Noah "40" Shebib, he was introduced to Drake who recorded the song "Shut It Down" featuring The-Dream, for his album, Thank Me Later.

Further co-production with Noah "40" Shebib led Omen to co-produce Lil Wayne's "I'm Single" featured on No Ceilings. The video for "I'm Single" premiered on MTV2 on April 18, 2010. "I'm Single" was also released on iTunes on May 11, 2010. "I'm Single" was officially released on Lil Wayne's I'm Not A Human Being album, which reached number one on the Billboard 200.

Omen had producer, programmer, lyricist and composer credits for Beyoncé's 2013 song "Mine" featuring Drake. Omen's last credited work as a producer was on the 2015 Action Bronson album Mr. Wonderful.

== Death ==
Brown died in his apartment in Harlem, New York City at the age of 49. His body was discovered by a family member on September 13, 2025.

== Production credits ==
- 2015
  - "Actin' Crazy" by Action Bronson
- 2013
  - "Mine" by Beyoncé from Beyoncé
- 2012
  - "What Happened 2 U" by Usher from Looking 4 Myself
  - "Black Hero Theme Musik Mixtape" by Omen and The Elaborate Musik Orchestra
  - "Vans On" by T. Mills
  - "Circus Act" by Angelina Lavo
  - "Jealous Girls" by Angelina Lavo
- 2011
  - "Applause" by Omen and the Elaborate Musik Orchestra featuring XV, 4IZE, Ashton Travis and Jigsaw Tha Puzzla
  - "Get Back" by Diggy Simmons, Ashton Travis, and Mike Jaggerr from Black Hero Theme Musik
  - "Negro Spiritual" by Mickey Factz, Ashton Travis, Nickelus F, Luckie Day, and The C3 Choir from Black Hero Theme Musik
  - "All For Me" by XV, Vado, Cyhi Da Prynce, and Erin Christine from Zero Heroes
- 2010
  - "Polo" remix by Vado featuring Young Dro
  - "Polo" by Vado from Slime Flu
  - "I'm Single" by Lil Wayne from I'm Not A Human Being
  - "Shut It Down" by Drake featuring The-Dream from Thank Me Later
- 2009
  - "I'm Single" by Lil Wayne from No Ceilings
- 2008
  - "Overdose On Life" featuring Drake, Mickey Factz, and Travis McCoy from Gym Class Heroes
- 2007
  - "Soopaman Luva 6" by Redman featuring Hurricane G from Red Gone Wild
- 2006
  - "Tell It Like It Is" by Ludacris from Release Therapy
- 2003
  - "Why Wouldn't I" and "Change Your or Change Me" by Fabolous from Street Dreams
  - "The Cause Of Death by Immortal Technique from Revolutionary Vol. 2
  - "Swagger Back" by Keith Murray from He's Keith Murray
- 2001
  - "One Day" by Fabolous from Ghetto Fabolous
- 2000
  - "No 1 Can Compare" by Amil from All Money Is Legal
- 1999
  - "Everybody" by Memphis Bleek from Coming of Age
