= Knockout (Lil Wayne song) =

Single by Lil Wayne featuring Nicki Minaj

from the album Rebirth
- Released: February 2, 2010
- Recorded: 2009
- Genre: Alternative rock; pop punk; rap rock
- Length: 4:09
- Label: Young Money; Cash Money; Universal Motown
- Songwriters: Dwayne Carter; Onika Maraj; Kevin Crowe; Erik Ortiz
- Producer: J.U.S.T.I.C.E. League

Lil Wayne singles chronology
"Miss Me" (2010)	"Knockout" (2010)	"No Love" (2010)

Nicki Minaj singles chronology
"Up Out My Face" (2010)	"Knockout" (2010)	"My Chick Bad" (2010)

Music video
- "Knockout" on YouTube

"Knockout" is a song by Lil Wayne, released by Young Money Entertainment, Cash Money Records, and Universal Motown Records on February 2, 2010 as the fourth single from his seventh album, Rebirth. It contains a guest appearance from Young Money newcomer Nicki Minaj, who performs the chorus and third verse. It also became her first song to enter the US Billboard Hot 100, where it peaked at number 44. A punk-inspired alternative rock song, it finds Wayne comparing him and his inamorata to "Black Ken" and "Barbie", respectively.

Despite being widely panned by music critics, "Knockout" has received platinum certification by the Recording Industry of America (RIAA).

== Reception ==
The song received generally negative reviews by critics. Behind the Hype gave the song a negative review, stating " 'Knockout' sounds like it's set to an old Blink-182 drumbeat and guitar riff, but without any of the fun. That’s a good analogy for the record as a whole." Culture Bully called it the worst track of the album, along with "The Price is Wrong", and added "'Knockout' stands as one of the best examples as to why vocoderized pop punk should not exist." AllHipHop stated that the song "possesses a fair balance of rock influenced music, but not offensive to his core base." Consequence of Sound commented that Minaj did a passable job and called the song a "tween rock anthem".

Rolling Stone stated that the only reason the album was given a generous review is because of this track (along with others) although there is an overly heavy use of auto-tune. Entertainment Weekly felt the song wasn't suited for Wayne stating "Wayne turns his efforts to blink-182-style pop-punk bounce ('Get a Life,' 'Knockout') and Prince-ly funk fervor ('I'll Die for You'), neither of which suits him much better." The New York Times called the song a parody stating "The songs might have been better as parodies than as imitations, although 'Knockout' — a Coldplay homage backing a raunchy lyric — comes close to being both."

== Music video ==
The video was shot by director David Rousseau on February 6, 2010, where Lil Wayne spent 48 hours shooting a variety of music videos for multiple songs. A sneak peek of the video was shown on May 26, 2010. The video premiered on May 29 of Memorial Day weekend along with videos of other singles from the Rebirth album including "Da Da Da", "Runnin' " with Shanell, and "Get a Life". The entire video was shot in front of a green-screen.

The video features Lil Wayne and Nicki Minaj living out a high school fantasy where Minaj plays Wayne's Barbie love interest. During the chorus Minaj sings into the camera wearing a wig that is split in half of blonde hair and green hair with pink hair underneath in the back. Lil Wayne makes a wardrobe change during his second verse and during Minaj's verse they are both in a boxing arena with a large crowd performing. The video ends with both artists in the boxing ring with Wayne shouting the final lyrics. Birdman makes a cameo in the video around the end.

== Charts ==
Chart (2010)	Peak position
US Billboard Hot 100	44

== Certifications ==
Region	Certification	Certified units/sales
United States (RIAA)	Platinum	1,000,000^{‡}
^{‡} Sales+streaming figures based on certification alone.
