= Coming of Age (Memphis Bleek album) =

Studio album by Memphis Bleek
- Released: August 3, 1999
- Studios: Roc-A-Fella Center (New York City, New York); Platinum Island (New York City, New York); Soundtrack (New York City, New York); Sony Music (New York City, New York); Battery (New York City, New York); Right Track (New York City, New York)
- Genre: Hip hop
- Length: 50:13
- Labels: Roc-A-Fella; Def Jam 2000; Island Def Jam
- Producers: Shawn Carter (exec.); Damon Dash (exec.); Kareem "Biggs" Burke (exec.); Swizz Beatz; Irv Gotti; Buckwild; Omen

Memphis Bleek chronology
Coming of Age (1999)	The Understanding (2000)

Singles from Coming of Age
- 1. "Memphis Bleek Is..." Released: June 8, 1999; 2. "What You Think Of That" Released: October 6, 1999

Coming of Age is the debut studio album by American rapper Memphis Bleek. It was released via The Island Def Jam Music Group, Def Jam Recordings and Jay-Z's Roc-A-Fella Records on August 3, 1999. The album spawned the hit single "Memphis Bleek Is...".

== Commercial performance ==
The album debuted and peaked at number 7 on the Billboard 200, with 118,000 units sold in its first week. The album was certified Gold by the RIAA on September 14, 1999, for shipments and sales of over 500,000 units in America.

== Critical reception ==
Professional ratings
Review scores
Source	Rating
AllMusic	3/5 stars
Entertainment Weekly	B+
Rolling Stone	2/5 stars
The Source	3/5 stars
USA Today	3/4 stars

Matt Diehl of Entertainment Weekly praised Bleek for holding his own lyrically alongside guest artists Ja Rule and N.O.R.E., and displaying striking sensitivity on "Regular Cat". He also noted how the album's production of "ominous inner-city symphonies and raw street beats" was ageless. Keith Farley from AllMusic noted how Bleek's vocal delivery was more "street-level" than Jay-Z's, along with the album containing an "urban funk" style like most of his material, concluding that "Still, Coming of Age is a fine debut that shows Memphis Bleek already leaps and bounds ahead of most rappers." In a dual review with Ja's Venni Vetti Vecci, Rolling Stone's Rob Sheffield felt that Bleek came across as a cliché-filled rapper that lacked witticism in his lyrics and wasted the beats given to him by his producers.

== Track listing ==
No.	Title	Writer(s)	Producer(s)	Length
1.	"Pain in da Ass Intro"			0:43
2.	"Who's Sleeping" (featuring Reb)	Malik Cox; Patrick Viala; Leon Lorick; Marvin Gaye	Pat Viala	2:40
3.	"Memphis Bleek Is..."	Cox; Kasseem Dean	Swizz Beatz	4:08
4.	"What You Think of That" (featuring Jay-Z)	Cox; Anthony Best; Shawn Carter; Keith Mansfield	Buckwild	4:40
5.	"Murda 4 Life" (featuring Ja Rule)	Cox; Jeffrey Atkins; Taiwan Green; Irving Lorenzo	Mr. Fingers; Irv Gotti	4:47
6.	"You're All Welcome (Pain Interlude)"			0:37
7.	"Stay Alive In NYC"	Cox; Jerald Stoute; Patti Austin; James Harris; Terry Lewis	J-Runnah; Darold "Pop" Trotter (co.)	4:14
8.	"You a Thug Nigga"	Cox; Lorenzo; Robert Mays	Irv Gotti; Lil Rob	4:14
9.	"N.O.W." (featuring Da Ranjahz)	Cox; Malcolm Byer; Nigel Leguerre	Dark Half	4:16
10.	"Everybody"	Cox; Sidney Brown	Omen	4:00
11.	"I Won't Stop" (featuring Dark Half)	Cox; Bernard Parker; Leguerre	Bernard "Big Demi" Parker	3:07
12.	"My Hood to Your Hood" (featuring Beanie Sigel)	Cox; Dwight Grant; Lorenzo; Green	Irv Gotti; Mr. Fingers	3:47
13.	"Why U Wanna Hate For" (featuring Noreaga)	Cox; Victor Santiago; Joseph Brim; Christopher Kellam; James Heard	The Burn Unit	3:49
14.	"Regular Cat"	Cox; Stoute; Ralph MacDonald; William Eaton; William Salter	J-Runnah	5:12

Sample credits

- "Who's Sleeping" contains a sample from "If This World Were Mine", written by Marvin Gaye, and performed by Zulema.
- "What You Think of That" contains a sample of "High Velocity", written and performed by Keith Mansfield.
- "Stay Alive in NYC" contains an interpolation of "Summer is the Coldest Time of Year", written by Patti Austin, James Harris, and Terry Lewis.
- "Regular Cat" contains a sample of "Love and Let Love", written by Ralph MacDonald, William Eaton, and William Salter; and performed by Roberta Flack.

== Personnel ==
- Juan Allen – engineer (12)
- B-High – co-executive producer
- Big Jaz – co-executive producer
- Kareem "Biggs" Burke – executive producer
- Eric "EBO" Butler – mixing (7, 14)
- Shawn Carter – executive producer
- Tom Coyne – mastering
- Damon Dash – executive producer
- The Drawing Board – art direction, design
- Irv Gotti – mixing (5)
- Ken Duro Ifill – mixing (4, 8, 11)
- Jonathan Mannion – photography
- Monica Morrow – stylist
- Joe Quinde – engineer (3), mixing (3, 13)
- Chico Spades – engineer (4, 13)
- Brian Stanley – engineer (10)
- Tai – instrumentation (5)
- Pat Viala – engineer (2, 5, 7–12, 14), mixing (2, 5, 9, 10, 12)

== Charts ==
=== Weekly charts ===
Chart (1999)	Peak position
US Billboard 200	7
US Top R&B/Hip-Hop Albums (Billboard)	1

=== Year-end charts ===
Chart (1999)	Position
US Top R&B/Hip-Hop Albums (Billboard)	72

== Certifications ==
Region	Certification	Certified units/sales
United States (RIAA)	Gold	500,000^{^}
^{^} Shipments figures based on certification alone.

== See also ==
- List of number-one R&B albums of 1999 (U.S.)
