= Full Sail University =

Private, for-profit university in Winter Park, Florida

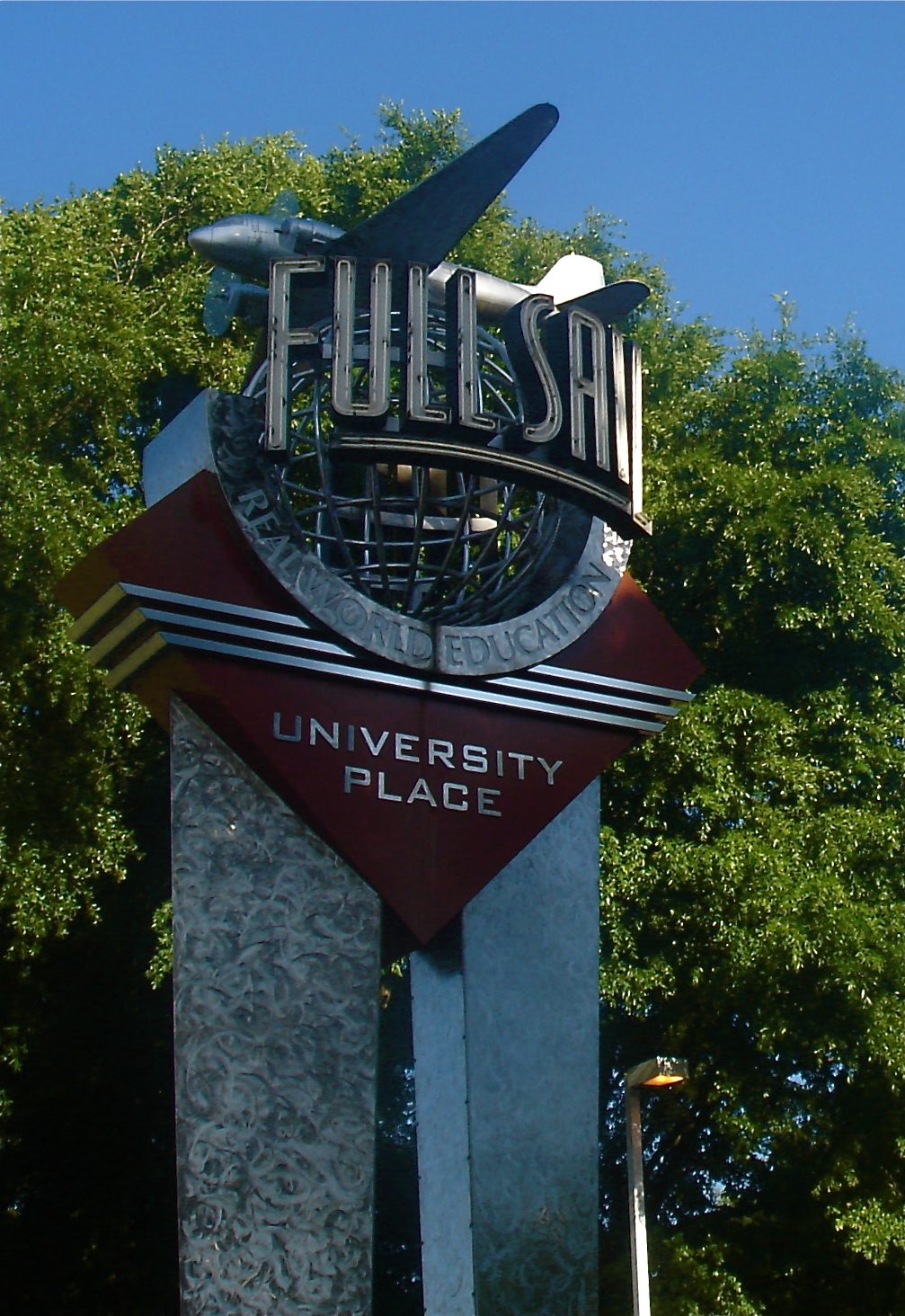
- Motto: If you're serious about your dream, we'll take your dream seriously
- Type: Private for-profit university
- Established: 1979
- Accreditation: ACCSC
- Chair: James W. "Bill" Heavener, Co-chairman & CEO
- President: Garry Jones
- Students: 26,737
- Undergraduates: 25,532
- Location: Winter Park, Florida, United States; 28°35′41″N 81°18′11″W
- Mascot: Douglas DC-3 airplane
- Website: fullsail.edu

Full Sail University is a private for-profit university in Winter Park, Florida. It was formerly a recording studio in Dayton, Ohio, named Full Sail Productions and Full Sail Center for the Recording Arts. The school moved to Florida in 1980, began offering bachelor's degrees in 2005, and began offering online degrees in 2007. The following year, the school was granted university status by the Florida Department of Education.

Full Sail is accredited by the Accrediting Commission of Career Schools and Colleges to award associate, bachelor's, and master's degrees in audio, design, computer animation and business administration.

== History ==
Full Sail University was founded by Jon Phelps in Dayton, Ohio, in 1979. Its curriculum was centered on recording arts and offered courses in audio engineering. It relocated to Orlando, Florida, in 1980 and added new courses to its core recording arts program. In 1989, Full Sail moved to its current location at Winter Park, Florida; the following year, it was accredited to grant specialized associate degrees.

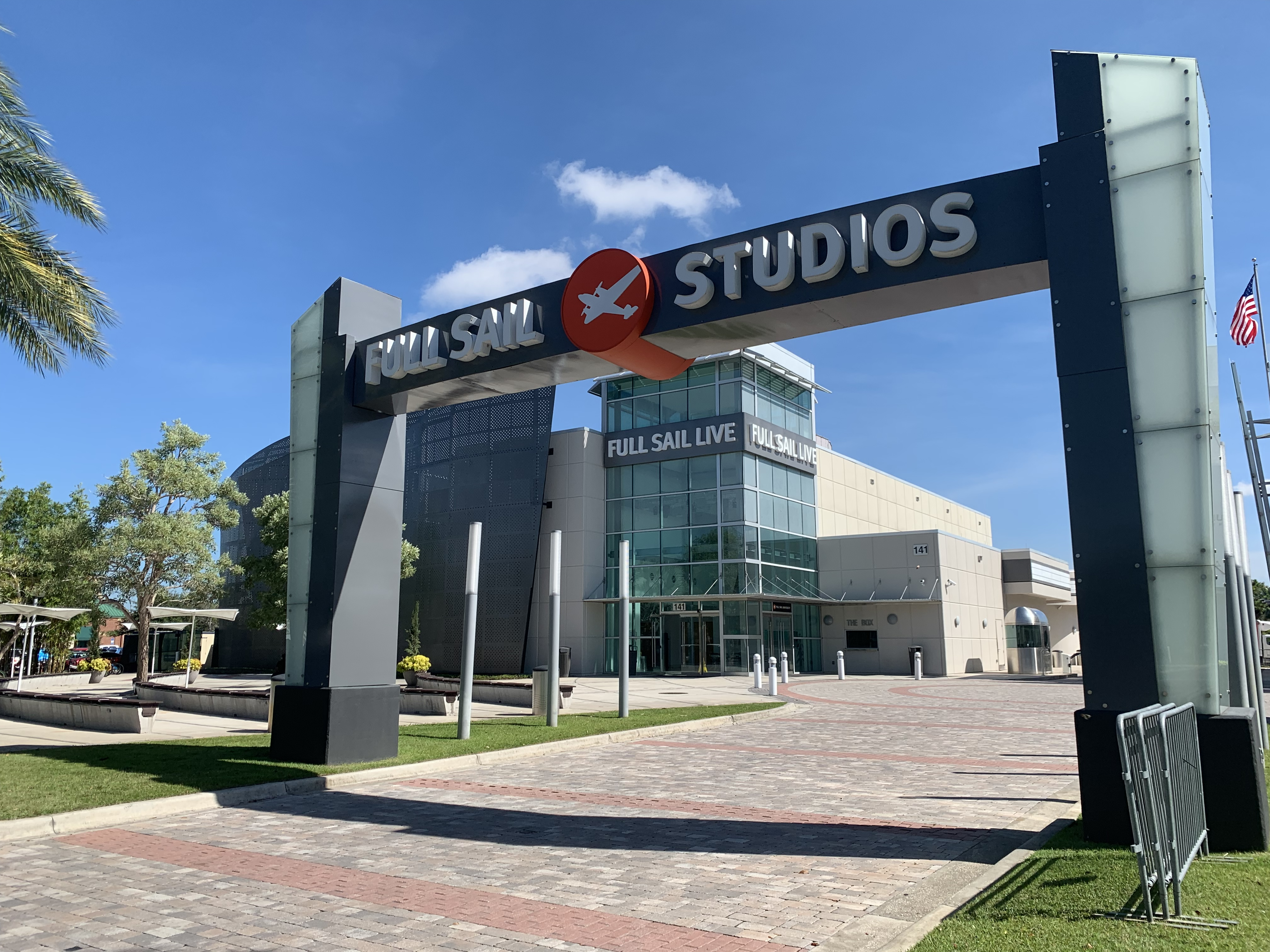
Full Sail Studios Arch

Enrollment doubled between 1989 and 1991 at a time of increased interest in film and media studies. The university had financial difficulties in 1992 and its growth slowed. Between 1995 and 1999, it began offering associate degrees in computer animation, digital media, game design and development, and show production and touring; these were later expanded into full bachelor's degree programs.

In 2005, the school offered its first bachelor's degree program, a Bachelor of Science degree in entertainment business. In 2007, the first master's degree program—also in the entertainment industry—was offered. Online degree programs began in 2007, the first of which was an online adaptation of the existing Entertainment Business Master of Science.

The additions of the master's degree programs, among other factors, led to the school being recognized as a university by the state of Florida. In 2008 it changed its name from Full Sail Real World Education to Full Sail University after attaining university status from the Florida Department of Education's Commission for Independent Education.

The curriculum and degree programs were broadened between 2006 and 2011, adding programs such as a Bachelor of Science in sports marketing and media, and a Master of Science degree in game design.

In 2012, WWE began filming episodes of its internet television show WWE NXT at Full Sail University. In June 2015, the school began hosting the WWE Tough Enough series. As part of the partnership between Full Sail and WWE, students have the opportunity to produce WWE NXT tapings, during which merchandise and tickets sales contribute to a scholarship fund for students enrolled at the university. As of January 2018, the partnership had resulted in $385,000 in scholarships. In September 2019, WWE and Full Sail University announced the expansion of their partnership. In 2020, it was announced that WWE NXT would stop taping at Full Sail University.

In 2015, the university announced a partnership with Wargaming and completed building a user experience lab for conducting research projects.

Full Sail University's Dan Patrick School of Sportscasting was established in 2017, with a sportscasting degree program and instruction provided by sportscaster and radio personality Dan Patrick.

== Campus ==
The university moved to Winter Park in 1989. Full Sail University's approximately 200-acre (81-hectare) campus is located 8.6 miles (13.8 kilometers) northeast of downtown Orlando. The campus has soundstages, a film backlot, and 110 studios. An office building for teaching staff for the online degree program was leased in 2009.

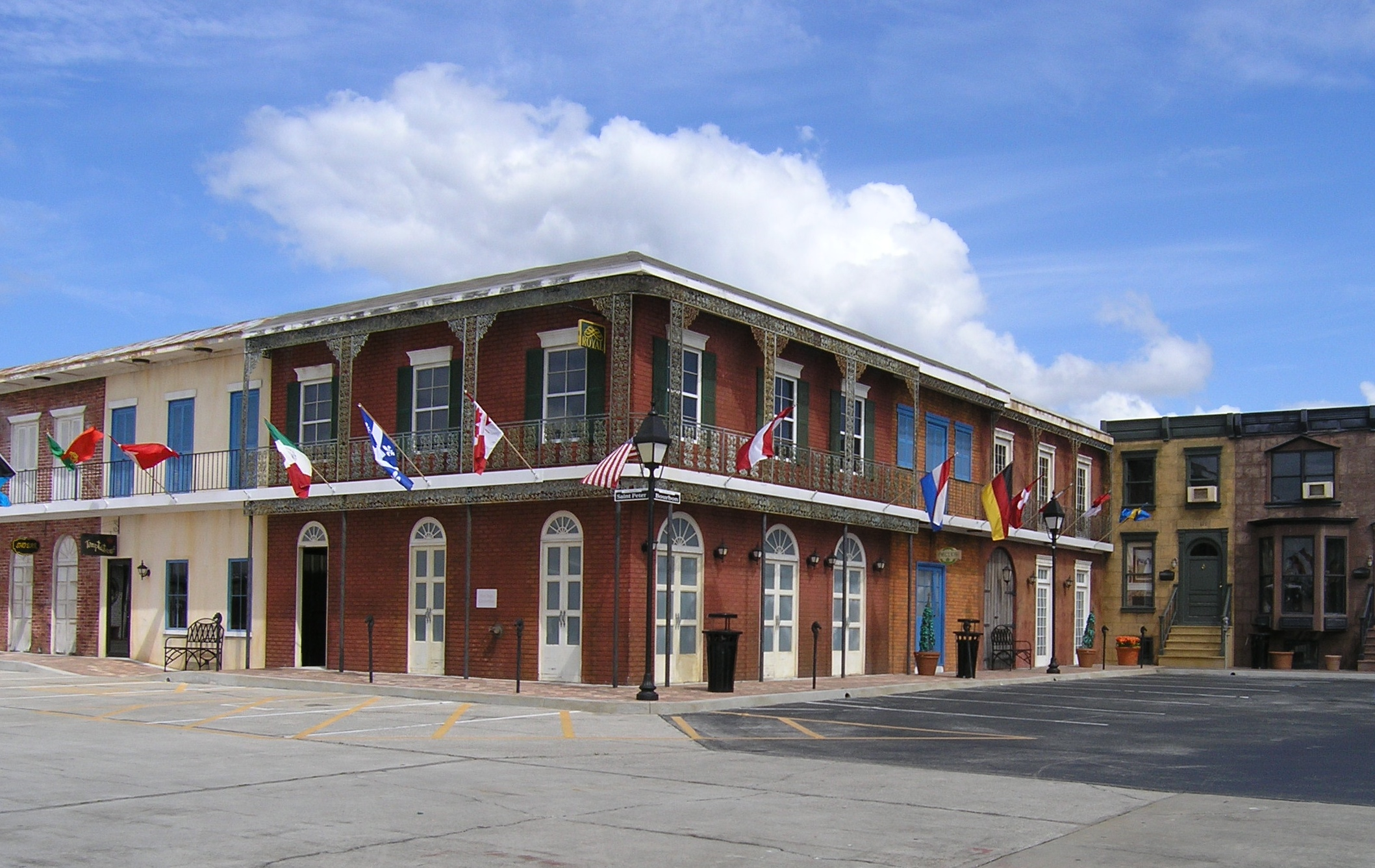
Full Sail University Backlot

In 2010, a new game studio was named "Blackmoor" (after a campaign in Dungeons & Dragons) in honor of Dave Arneson, who taught game design at the school from 1999 to 2008. In November 2010, in partnership with ESPN, the school opened a new laboratory for research and development in studio technologies. Two months later, approximately 200 Full Sail Online employees moved into the Gateway Center in Downtown Orlando. Also in 2011, the university announced plans to construct an 86,000-square-foot (8,000 m^{2}) educational building to house 475 faculty and staff, additional film and television soundstages and classrooms; it was scheduled for completion in early 2012. In July 2011, Full Sail acquired Lakeview Office Park in Orlando.

Full Sail University Fortress

In October 2018, Full Sail announced plans to construct an esports arena called "The Fortress". The 11,200-square-foot venue opened in May 2019, serves as home of Full Sail University's esports team, Armada.

In 2020, The Fortress was named a top-10 collegiate esports facility. It was also named one of the "15 Most Elite Universities for Pursuing Esports Careers in North America" in 2020. The Virtual Production Studio opened on the main campus in March 2022.

== Technology ==
Two emerging technology labs opened on campus in 2025. The Spatial Computing Innovation Lab provides an immersive environment for exploring video and spatial computing technologies, including devices such as the Apple Vision Pro and Blackmagic’s immersive camera systems. The Drone Innovation Center offers an indoor space for instruction in drone technology, featuring controlled airspace, fabrication pods, and workstations for simulation and programming.

The IBM Cyber Defense Range opened on campus in 2026, providing a cybersecurity training environment that features simulated enterprise and cloud-based networks, advanced visualization systems, and hands-on cyberattack and defense simulations. The simulations align with the National Initiative for Cybersecurity Education and National Institute of Standards and Technology standards.

== Academics ==
Full Sail's academic degree programs are primarily focused on audio, film and media production, video game design, animation and other studies related to the media and entertainment industries. Full Sail began offering coursework in creating augmented reality (AR) and virtual reality (VR) projects in 2016, housed in the campus's Fabrication Lab.

Full Sail is accredited by the Accrediting Commission of Career Schools and Colleges (ACCSC). In 2007 and 2011, the college was subject to criticism regarding limited transferability of credits.

== Student outcomes ==
According to the College Scorecard, as of July 2024, Full Sail has a 47% graduation rate. Academic year prices for full-time, first-time undergrad students in the 2023–2024 period was $26,947.

== Awards and rankings ==
In 1989, 1990, and 1991, the Full Sail Center for the Recording Arts won Mix magazine's outstanding institutional achievement award for recording schools. In 2005, Rolling Stone called Full Sail "one of the five best music programs in the country".

The college was named FAPSC School/College of the Year (an award for which only career colleges in Florida were eligible) by the Florida Association of Postsecondary Schools and Colleges (FAPSC) in 2008, 2011,2014, and 2019. Full Sail was recognized for its 21st-century best practices in distance learning by the United States Distance Learning Association (USDLA) in 2011, and was the recipient of New Media Consortium Center for Excellence Award in 2011 and 2015.

Full Sail's Game Design master's degree has been ranked in The Princeton Review's Top 25 Graduate Program for Video Game Design consecutively since 2014. As of 2026, Full Sail has ranked in TheWrap's list of the "Top 50 Film Schools" the last nine years in a row since 2016. Since 2020, Animation Career Review has ranked Full Sail University among its Top 50 Animation Schools in the U.S. for seven consecutive years.

Full Sail also ranked among the top 50 undergraduate game design programs in The Princeton Review's rankings from 2021 through the latest 2026 edition. In 2025 and 2026, Full Sail University was ranked in Billboard Magazine's Top Music Business Schools list. In 2026, Full Sail graduates won the Grand Prize in the Coca-Cola Refreshing Films program, and a Full Sail student team won its Cinemark Fan Favorite award.

== Notable alumni ==
- Christopher Aker, founder of Linode
- Marcella Araica, ASCAP Award-winning audio and mixing engineer
- J Beatzz (born Joshua Adams), record producer
- Cheese (born Jason Goldberg), record producer and audio engineer
- Corey Beaulieu, guitarist for the American heavy metal band Trivium
- Adam Best, entrepreneur, film producer, political activist, writer
- Brad Blackwood, Grammy and Pensado Award-winning mastering engineer
- Darren Lynn Bousman, film director and screenwriter
- Bre-Z (born Calesha Murray), actress on Empire (2015) and musician
- Soufiane El Khalidy, actor, filmmaker and writer
- Collie Buddz (born Colin Harper), musician and singer
- Corrin Campbell, musician and singer
- Jason Citron, co-founder and former CEO of Discord and founder of OpenFeint
- Ryan Connolly, filmmaker, Internet celebrity, presenter
- Chad Crawford, television host
- Christine D'Clario, Christian music singer and songwriter
- DJ Swivel (born Jordan Young), Grammy award-winning mixer, music producer, audio engineer
- Dylan Dresdow, Grammy award-winning mixer, Emmy award-winning mixer, music producer, audio engineer
- FKi 1st (born Trocon Roberts), record producer and disc jockey
- JD Harmeyer, producer, The Howard Stern Show
- London on da Track (born London Holmes), record producer and songwriter (attended)
- Mike Jaggerr, musician, producer, songwriter
- Kaká, footballer (attended, graduation unconfirmed)
- E. L. Katz Film director, producer and screenwriter
- Sebastian Krys, Grammy winning audio engineer and record producer
- Ross Lara, audio engineer and record producer
- Colin Leonard, Grammy award-winning mastering engineer. Won 2024 Grammy for his mastering engineering work on Victoria Monét's Jaguar II
- Machinedrum (born Travis Stewart), electronic music producer and performer
- Graham Marsh, record producer and recording engineer
- William McDowell, gospel musician
- Steven C. Miller, film director, editor, and screenwriter
- Nathan Nance, Emmy award-winning sound mixer and engineer
- Tre Nagella, Grammy award-winning American recording engineer, mixer and record producer
- Brett Novak, director and filmmaker
- Jeff Pinilla, director, editor, producer
- Viktor Prokopenya, technology entrepreneur
- Gary Rizzo, Oscar winning audio engineer, re-recording mixer
- Andrés Saavedra, Latin Grammy award-winning producer
- Rafa Sardina, record producer and audio engineer
- Phil Tan, Grammy-winning audio engineer
- Devvon Terrell, rapper and record producer
- Terrell Grice, producer, singer-songwriter, YouTuber
- Alex Tumay, audio engineer and disc jockey
- Rocco Did It Again! (born Rocco Valdes), record producer and songwriter
- Tal Anderson, American actress and author.
- Stuart White, Grammy award-winning recording/mixing engineer
- Adam Wingard, cinematographer, film director and editor
- Alex Vincent, actor
- Brian Yale, 4× Grammy award-nominated bass guitarist with Matchbox Twenty

== Notable faculty ==
Instructors at who have taught at Full Sail include Dungeons & Dragons co-creator Dave Arneson (game design), and Oprah Winfrey's domestic partner, Stedman Graham. Other notable instructors include James Neihouse, cinematographer and lifetime member of the Academy, a 6,000-member group that votes on Oscar nominees. Oscar-winning sound engineer Bill W. Benton teaches in the Film Production MFA program, and former wrestler Ed Ferrera teaches the creative writing program.
