= Jeff Pinilla =

American film producer

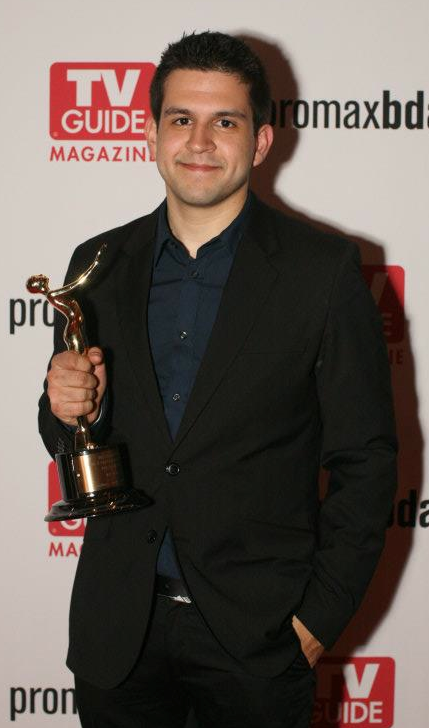
Pinilla in 2012

Jeff Pinilla (/ˌp ih nee yah /; Colombian Spanish:; (born November 17, 1988) is a writer, producer, director, and editor. Since graduating from Full Sail University in 2009, he has been nominated for 11 Emmy awards, has won 5 Promax Gold Awards, and was awarded the "Ron Scalera Rocket Award" at the PromaxBDA 2012 Awards. (This award is given to any individual with two years or less experience who is doing outstanding work.) In his years since graduating, Jeff has also successfully produced three short films, "Numbers on a Napkin", a short documentary titled "The first 36 hours: an inside look at Hurricane Sandy." and was awarded "Best Narrative Short Film" at the 2013 Woodstock Film Festival for "The earth, the way I left it." His first major recognition in the industry came in the summer of 2010, when he was credited for his work as producer and photographer on a print campaign for New Yorks WPIX 11 newscast. His work garnered him a Promax Gold Award for "best consumer print advertisement."

== Early life and education ==
Jeffrey Pinilla was born in Dallas, TX in 1988. His mother, Angela Maria Figueroa is a registered dental assistant in Plano, TX and his father, Edgar Armando Pinilla, is a middle school math educator for Dallas Independent School District. While in Texas, Jeff attended Sachse High School. In June 2009, Jeff graduated from Full Sail University in Orlando, FL with a bachelor of science degree in film.

== Early Career and New York City ==
While attending Full Sail University, Pinilla had the opportunity to work as a part-time college outreach representative for Current TV. While working for Current, Pinilla had a documentary that was sold to the television station for broadcasting rights. The title of the film was "Seventyone: the seven decades of Jose Postigo." The documentary was a student film Pinilla had produced and edited while in school about 71-year-old weightlifting champion, Jose Postigo.

After graduation, Pinilla moved to New York City where he began freelancing as an assistant photographer for Michael Luppino. Shortly after, Pinilla edited and co-directed a documentary titled "Alive Inside." A clip from this documentary was leaked on the web in 2012, becoming a viral hit within hours. At 5 million views, Pinilla was recognized as one of the forces behind the powerful clip that became an internet sensation.

== 2010 - 2013 ==
By July, 2010, Pinilla was hired by Tribune as a writer/producer/editor for their East coast creative group. While working here, Pinilla produced and photographed a print campaign for News York's WPIX11 Newscast, for which he was awarded the Promax Gold Award. The campaign was exhibited on the New York City subway cars and gained notable attention from many in the media. On March 17, 2011, Pinilla managed to raise $7,000 (equivalent to $10,018 in 2025) through Kickstarter to fund a script he had been neglecting. The short film, titled: Numbers on a napkin, was included in several film festival programs such as the HBO Latino International Film Festival, Big Apple Film festival, and Westchester Film Festival.

In February 2011, Pinilla went on to earn himself 6 Emmy nominations in the local New York market as a writer and producer. and on June 14, 2012, Pinilla was awarded the PromaxBDA Ron Scalera "Rocket Award". The award is given to any individual that has been working in the industry for two years or less and is doing outstanding work. Pinilla also earned himself three Promax Gold awards for his work as writer, producer, and editor.

Shortly after summer ended, Hurricane Sandy struck the east coast, and Jeff, as someone with a great respect for the medium, offered an engrossing portrait of a news crew in action with his documentary 'The First 36 Hours: An Inside Look at Hurricane Sandy'. The 22-minute film was selected as a Vimeo Staff Pick on the site "Vimeo.com", and follows reporter Arthur Chi’en and cameraman Kenton Young as they captured the events of the tragic storm that ravaged New York in October 2012. The film has garnered much attention and shortly after, On April 14, 2013, Jeff was honored with an Emmy Award for writing and producing an anti-bullying commercial for New York's WPIX Newscast entitled "The Bully."

In March, 2013, Pinilla began principal photography on his third short film entitled "The earth, the way I left it." The film completed post production and was recently awarded "Best Narrative Short Film" at the 2013 Woodstock Film Festival.

== National Commercials, Creative Director, Films, and more ==
On December 18, 2014 Global media studio "NBTV" announced that Jeff would join their team as the Director in Residence and Creative director. Since that time, Pinilla has written and directed several national commercials for big brands, one of them being an NCAA Campaign for Coke Zero entitled "frenemies". The frenemies campaign aired during the 2015 tip off NCAA championship game. Shortly thereafter, Pinilla and producing partner Matt Pourviseh took on a total rebrand of the cold remedy brand "Cold-Eeze". Together, they wrote, directed, and executed a memorable set of national commercials that aired during the 2015 winter cold season. With continued success as a commercial director in 2015, Jeff Pinilla was also credited as the screenplay writer for a documentary entitled "We The People: The Market Basket Effect" which chronicles one of the stranger labor disputes in recent memory – and also one of the most heartwarming, as it turned out. The film is narrated by Michael Chiklis and is produced by Nick Buzzell, Mike Buzzell, Robert Friedman, and Ted Leonsis. The film is set to be theatrically released in early 2016.

In June 2017, Pinilla, Rachid Hoaues, and Maurice DuBois of CBS sat down with David Berkowitz, The son of sam killer, at the Shawangunk Correctional Facility in Wallkill, N.Y. Using firsthand accounts from shooting victims, police and reporters, SON OF SAM │THE KILLER SPEAKS, a 1-hour special co-produced and edited by Jeff Pinilla, relives the fear that paralyzed many New Yorkers as word spread that someone was committing random shootings – all done with a high-power .44 caliber weapon. The killer hit strangers, often couples in parked cars, and the women usually had shoulder-length, dark brown hair. The shooter was dubbed the “.44 Caliber Killer” by New York newspapers. For a while, as the victim count rose, the only substantial clues police had were two letters: one sent to Detective Joe Borelli, the head of the task force looking for the killer, and the other to newspaper columnist Jimmy Breslin, then at the New York Daily News. In an extensive interview, Berkowitz talks with DuBois about the impact finding out he was adopted had on him, about his outreach inside and outside of prison walls, and how the world has changed around him. For instance, in the time since he was incarcerated, cell phones and the internet have proliferated. “That’s all space-age stuff to me,” Berkowitz says. “I’m from the dark ages. You know, when I left, tokens on the subway, you know, yeah?”

In March 2018, The global youth media brand VICE and TAG Heuer introduced a short documentary directed by Pinilla and producing partner Matt Pourviseh about musician and Brand Ambassador J Balvin with a Premiere in Colombia. Filmed in New York and Medellin, the film presents J Balvin's success story and provides personal insights into his path to global superstardom.
