= No Ceilings =

Mixtape by Lil Wayne
- Released: October 31, 2009
- Recorded: 2009
- Genre: Hip-hop
- Length: 72:34
- Labels: Young Money, Cash Money

Lil Wayne chronology
Dedication 3 (2008)	No Ceilings (2009)	Rebirth (2010)

Commercial release cover

No Ceilings is the ninth mixtape by American rapper Lil Wayne. It was scheduled to be released on October 31, 2009, but was leaked before the official date. No Ceilings was officially released on October 31, 2009, with 4 additional tracks. The mixtape is available as a free and legal download and it received widespread acclaim from critics. An abridged version was officially released to streaming services on August 28, 2020, excluding ten songs.

== Recording and release ==
Two Lil Wayne tracks, "Wasted" and "Swag Surf," were leaked onto the internet on October 11. These were followed by "Run This Town" on October 25. The majority of the mixtape was leaked out to the public on multiple websites October 26, 2009. The mixtape contains various freestyles over popular rap and R&B songs' instrumentals and features artists from his Young Money label including Nicki Minaj, Short Dawg, Gudda Gudda, Shanell, Jae Millz, and Tyga. It was officially released on weareyoungmoney.com via a live Ustream video and included higher quality audio as well as four additional tracks. The song "Single" was released on May 11, 2010 as a single on iTunes titled "I'm Single", and charted on the Billboard Hot 100 chart. The single was also released on Wayne's I Am Not a Human Being album. The song "No Ceilings" was released to iTunes under the title "Pop That" on the Loyalty EP, which also included Birdman's new single "Loyalty", which featured Tyga and Lil Wayne.

When police pulled over Wayne's tour bus after claiming to smell marijuana, the rapper pleaded guilty to "attempted criminal possession of a weapon." Although pleading guilty still landed Wayne in Riker's Island Prison for a year, it greatly reduced his possible sentence. Wayne was dealing with his arrest and charges while writing the mixtape, and he actually mentions his arrest multiple times in lyrics throughout the tape.

== Critical reception ==
Professional ratings
Review scores
Source	Rating
Consequence of Sound	3.5/5 stars
FACT	3.5/5
MSN Music (Consumer Guide)	A−
Pitchfork	7.7/10
Rolling Stone	3.5/5 stars
Sputnikmusic	4.5/5
Tom Hull – on the Web	A−

Reviewing in April 2010 for MSN Music, Robert Christgau hailed No Ceilings as Lil Wayne's best release since Tha Carter III and a "welcome alternative" to his contemporaneous rock album Rebirth (2010). Noting a richness and humor in his lyrics, the critic said that Lil Wayne "recycles beats from Dirty South throwaways whose originals you need never think of again, shows Fabolous how fabulous the 'Throw It in the Bag' remix might have been, holds his own with Jay-Z and the Black Eyed Peas, and eases the mixtape's title onto every track". In another piece for The Barnes & Noble Review, Christgau elaborated on his praise, but also offered points of criticism: "[T]his is a gift except when some dolt like Tyga or Jae Milz [sic] gets a verse ... though the boasts are mostly prime and the rhymes fun enough, it's all pretty surface—there's nothing as tricky as 'Walk It Out,' much less 'I Feel Like Dying.' And the occasional references to his forthcoming [prison bid] are strictly by the book." Christgau later ranked No Ceilings as the 18th best album of the year.

In November 2018, The Nicholls Worth included No Ceilings in its list of the best mixtapes of the past decade, alongside Acid Rap (Chance the Rapper, 2013), Days Before Rodeo (Travis Scott, 2014), A Love Letter to You (Trippie Redd, 2017), Barter 6 (Young Thug, 2015), and Luv Is Rage (Lil Uzi Vert, 2015).

== Sequels ==
A sequel mixtape, No Ceilings 2, was confirmed on the six-year anniversary of the original mixtape's release by Mack Maine on his Twitter page. Lil Wayne performed his freestyle over Future's "Where Ya At?" at an event prior to its release, and two 30-second clips of that performance can be found online. He also recorded his freestyle over Drake's "Back to Back" before an interview.

No Ceilings 3 was released on November 27, 2020. The mixtape was hosted by DJ Khaled, an American record producer with whom Lil Wayne had previously collaborated.

== Commercial release ==
On August 28, 2020, over 10 years from the initial free release, the mixtape was released to streaming platforms. The commercial release omitted all 3 skits and 7 songs, presumed to be due to sample clearance issues. A bonus track titled "Kobe Bryant" was also included. It is a rework of Wayne's 2009 song with the same title.

== Track listing ==
No.	Title	Original instrumental	Length
1.	"Swag Surf"	"Swag Surfin" by FLY	4:10
2.	"Ice Cream"	"Ice Cream Paint Job" by Dorrough	3:25
3.	"D.O.A."	"D.O.A. (Death of Auto-Tune)" by Jay-Z	4:32
4.	"Skit #1" (featuring Gudda Gudda)	"Always Love You" by Gudda Gudda	1:18
5.	"Wasted"	"Wasted" by Gucci Mane	4:13
6.	"Watch My Shoes"	"Watch My Shoes" by 3 Deep	4:39
7.	"Break Up" (featuring Short Dawg and Gudda Gudda)	"Break Up" by Mario	3:48
8.	"Banned from TV"	"Banned from T.V." by Noreaga	2:54
9.	"Throw It in the Bag"	"Throw It in the Bag" (Remix) by Fabolous	2:55
10.	"That's All I Have" (featuring Tyga and Zipp)	"I Think I Luv Her" by Gucci Mane	3:55
11.	"Skit #2" (featuring Shanell)	"Save Me" by Shanell	1:39
12.	"Wayne on Me" (featuring Shanell)	"Wetter" by Twista	4:15
13.	"I'm Good" (featuring Lucci Lou)	Original instrumental, produced by MonstaBeatz	2:26
14.	"Poke Her Face" (featuring Jae Millz)	"Make Her Say" by Kid Cudi	2:16
15.	"Run This Town"	"Run This Town" by Jay-Z	2:49
16.	"I Got No Ceilings" (featuring Mack Maine)	"I Gotta Feeling" by the Black Eyed Peas	3:46
17.	"Skit End"	"Sexy Bitch" by David Guetta	1:36
18.	"No Ceilings (Pop That)" (featuring Birdman)	"Licence to Kill" by Gladys Knight	3:58
19.	"Oh Let's Do It"	"O Let's Do It" by Waka Flocka Flame	3:46
20.	"I'm Single"	Original instrumental, produced by Noah "40" Shebib; Omen (co.)	5:33
21.	"Sweet Dreams" (Beyoncé featuring Lil Wayne and Nicki Minaj)	"Sweet Dreams" by Beyoncé	4:47
Total length:			1:12:34

The mixtape's 2020 streaming edition excluded 10 tracks, 3 of them being skits, while adding the song "Kobe Bryant".

== Charts ==
Chart performance for No Ceilings
Chart (2020)	Peak position
US Billboard 200	18
