= Rebirth (Lil Wayne album) =

Studio album by Lil Wayne
- Released: February 2, 2010
- Recorded: 2008–2009
- Studios: Effigy Studios (Ferndale, Michigan); Record Room Studios; YMCM Studio (Miami, Florida)
- Genre: Rap rock
- Length: 46:43
- Labels: Young Money; Cash Money; Universal Motown
- Producers: Bryan "Birdman" Williams (exec.); Ronald "Slim" Williams (exec.); Lil Wayne (exec.); Infamous; Andrew "Drew" Correa; Cool & Dre; J.U.S.T.I.C.E. League; Travis Barker; Streetrunner; Chase N. Cashe; DJ Nasty & LVM; Hit-Boy; Kevin Rudolf

Lil Wayne chronology
| No Ceilings (2009) | Rebirth (2010) | I Am Not a Human Being (2010) |

Singles from Rebirth
- 1. "Prom Queen" Released: January 27, 2009; 2. "On Fire" Released: December 1, 2009; 3. "Da Da Da" Released: December 8, 2009; 4. "Drop the World" Released: December 28, 2009; 5. "Knockout" Released: February 2, 2010

Rebirth is the seventh studio album by American rapper Lil Wayne, released February 2, 2010, on Cash Money Records, Young Money Entertainment and Universal Motown. The album's production was primarily handled by Cool & Dre, DJ Infamous, DJ Nasty & LVM, Kevin Rudolf, and J.U.S.T.I.C.E. League. Rebirth was promoted as Wayne's rock music debut, though it includes some hip-hop tracks. The album features guest appearances from Eminem, Kevin Rudolf, Shanell and Nicki Minaj.

The album debuted at number two on the US Billboard 200, selling 176,000 copies in its first week. The album became Wayne's seventh top-ten album in the United States and produced four singles, that which attained chart success. Upon its release, Rebirth received generally negative reviews from music critics. The album has been certified platinum by the Recording Industry Association of America (RIAA), with domestic shipment of a million copies in the United States.

== Background ==
The album was originally thought to be the re-release of his triple-platinum album Tha Carter III. The album was supposed to be released December 21, 2008, but Wayne pushed the date back. A week before its first scheduled release Amazon accidentally shipped 500 copies of the album to customers who pre-ordered it. On January 23, 2009, Wayne told MTV that the album will not be a re-release, but will be his rock album debut. The album was originally scheduled for an April 7, 2009 release, however it went through multiple release dates and was finally released on February 2, 2010. Young Money artist, Shanell, stated that the delays were due to Wayne's desire for the album to be "perfect". The first single, "Prom Queen", was produced by Infamous and Andrew "Drew" Correa. The song made its official debut on January 27, appearing on Wayne's MySpace page. Wayne performed the single live for the first time during a concert in San Diego, which was streamed live by Ustream on AT&T's FREEdom of Choice and Mobile Music Facebook pages that evening. "Prom Queen" peaked at No. 15 on the Billboard Hot 100 charts.

Lil Wayne stated he collaborated with Fall Out Boy for his album, while he also lent his vocals for their Folie à Deux album. He reportedly paid homage to the Beastie Boys, as well as included a song that involves him rapping over stringed instruments, described as being similar to Coldplay's "Viva la Vida", on the album as well. Young Money artist, Shanell, collaborated with Wayne on the album. Eminem also contributed to the album, with an appearance on a track titled "Drop the World".

Birdman had confirmed that Tha Carter IV would be packaged with Rebirth as a double disc album. However, Wayne denied this idea saying that "Tha Carter IV deserves Tha Carter IV". He went on to say that We Are Young Money may be packaged with Rebirth. However, in November 2009, Wayne said that the albums would be released separately. Billboard magazine received an e-mail from a customer of online retailer Amazon.com stating that Amazon.com shipped copies of Rebirth as early as December 14. Amazon shipped about 500 pre-ordered copies and blamed a "shipping error". Young Money Entertainment president Mack Maine stated that the album would have different tracks than that of the leaked version.

== Recording and production ==
The first single, "Prom Queen", was produced by the duo of DJ Infamous and Drew Correa, notable for producing the Grammy nominated track from Tha Carter III, "Mr. Carter". Cool & Dre and Develop also aided with production. Birdman also stated that the album would feature a song entitled "I'm Not Human". When the lead single, "Prom Queen", quickly fell off of the charts shortly after entry, there was some speculation that the album would be shelved. Despite these rumors, Lil Wayne released the single "Hot Revolver" to iTunes on March 17, 2009. On the single "On Fire" produced by Cool & Dre, Lil Wayne has been said to play the guitar; he plays bass in "Da Da Da". Most of Lil Wayne's vocals are recorded using AutoTune. He considered naming the album: "Rebirth Of Auto-Tune".

== Singles ==
"Prom Queen" (feat. Shanell), the album's lead single, was released on January 27, 2009. It was the highest charted single from the album, peaking at No. 15 on the Billboard Hot 100. "On Fire" replaced "Hot Revolver" as the album's second single due to the absence of "Hot Revolver" from the album. "On Fire" was released on December 1, 2009, and peaked at No. 62 on the Billboard Hot 100. The song contains samples from Amy Holland's song "She's on Fire". "Drop the World" (feat. Eminem) was released as the album's third single on December 28, 2009, and peaked at No. 18 on the Billboard Hot 100. The song was praised by critics as the album's highlight.

"Hot Revolver" was intended to be on Rebirth. The single was released on iTunes on March 17, 2009. It reached No. 33 on the Billboard Hot 100 and number No. 54 on the Canadian Hot 100. The song did not appear on the album and was replaced by "On Fire" as the album's second single. "Da Da Da" was released to the US iTunes Store on December 1, 2009. The song failed to chart. A music video was filmed in February 2010. "American Star" (feat. Shanell) charted at No. 91 on the Billboard Hot 100 following the album's release due to strong digital downloads. "Knockout" (feat. Nicki Minaj) debuted on the Billboard Hot 100 at No. 44 following the album's release due to strong digital sales. A song titled "Fuck Today (Rebirth Mix)" featuring Gudda Gudda was released on iTunes to promote the album's release on February 2, 2010. The song reached No. 76 on the Billboard Hot 100.

== Critical reception ==
Professional ratings
Aggregate scores
| Source | Rating |
|---|---|
| AnyDecentMusic? | 3.5/10 |
| Metacritic | 37/100 |
Review scores
| Source | Rating |
| AllMusic | 2/5 stars |
| Entertainment Weekly | D+ |
| The Guardian | 2/5 stars |
| Los Angeles Times | 1/4 stars |
| NME | 4/10 |
| Now | 1/5 stars |
| Pitchfork | 4.5/10 |
| Rolling Stone | 2.5/5 stars |
| Slant Magazine | 1.5/5 stars |
| Spin | 3/10 |

Rebirth received generally negative reviews from contemporary music critics. At Metacritic, which assigns a normalized rating out of 100 to reviews from mainstream critics, the album received an average score of 37, which indicates "generally unfavorable reviews", based on 21 reviews. Rebirth was the lowest rated album of 2010 at Metacritic and it is ranked sixth on the site's list of worst-reviewed albums. Los Angeles Times critic Jeff Weiss called Rebirth "one of the worst albums of the year so far", and Sam Wolfson of NME called it an "absurd" "shlock-rock record". Chicago Tribune critic Greg Kot panned Wayne's stylistic change and described his lyrics as "crushingly banal". AllMusic's David Jeffries called the album "a loud and ignorable bore". Christian Hoard of Rolling Stone found Wayne's "taste in rock" to be "very questionable" and the album's flaw. Joe Clay of The Times panned Wayne's singing and songwriting, calling his lyrics "devoid of humour and imagination". M.T. Richards of PopMatters panned its music as "an endless stream of abysmally written, Auto Tune-drenched nothings". Nathan Rabin of The A.V. Club viewed the album's music and lyrics as clichéd, writing that it "plays like an over-the-top parody of a rock album".

Christopher R. Weingarten of The Village Voice wrote that Wayne's lyrics "still walk some fascinating line between signifying unmistakable genius, curious savant, or total dick", but viewed the album as lacking substance, stating "Wayne's big problem is that he seems to like the idea of rock music more than any actual rock music itself". Pitchfork's Ryan Dombal called Rebirth "an unlikely, unqualified, and quite unbelievable rock album". Slant Magazine's Jesse Cataldo described it as "a total misperception of what makes a rock record" and found its sound "mostly unrecognizable, a twisted amalgam of tacky set pieces collected from throughout the genre's history". Alexis Petridis of The Guardian stated, "Given that everyone knows Carter can do so much better than this, it all smacks a bit of condescension, of locating a different audience, then talking down to them". Leah Greenblatt of Entertainment Weekly stated, "[Michael] Jordan returned to the basketball court after one ill-fated season in the farm leagues; we can only hope for the same for Wayne".

Despite the album's negative reception, several music critics wrote favorably of the single "Drop the World" and Eminem's verse on the song, viewing it as a highlight on the album. Charles Aaron of Spin commented that "perhaps the greatest musical tantrum of 2010 ... occurs on perhaps the most misbegotten musical pratfall of 2010." In his consumer guide for MSN Music, Robert Christgau felt Rebirth was "underrated" and gave it a two-star honorable mention, indicating a "likable effort consumers attuned to its overriding aesthetic or individual vision may well enjoy." He cited "Drop the World" and "American Star" as highlights and quipped, "So smart and scary about death as the flip side of ecstasy, so unperceptive and embarrassing about emo". Jon Pareles of The New York Times wrote that its lyrics "stay dutifully on topic" and found "how it reveals a rapper's view of rock" as interesting, writing "For Lil Wayne rock is bombast and cliché in which high-school traumas are avenged, heaven and hell are frequently invoked and existential predicaments are taken seriously".

The only website to give the album a positive reception is RapReviews, whose author, John-Michael Bond, gave it a score of seven out of ten and said that the album "has moments of genius, and those moments almost always coincide with coupling fiery emotion with punk's propulsive rhythm." Other reviews are average or mixed or negative, with Devin Chanda of Billboard giving the album a score of 56 out of 100; Steve Jones of USA Today giving it two stars out of four; Uncut giving it a score of two stars out of five; Jason Draper of Yahoo! Music UK giving it a score of three stars out of ten; Joseph Patterson of BBC Music giving it an unfavorable review; Ryan Faughnder of No Ripcord giving it a score of two stars out of ten; and Joshua Errett of Now giving it a score of only one star out of five. HotNewHipHop suggested that the negative reception to the album was a "glaring [example] of the music media immediately shutting down Black artists for stepping outside of the confines of what is deemed as ‘Black music.’" The publication also said that Lil Wayne's use of autotune on the album and it's "raw rock attitude" would prove "to be highly influential on the next generation of rap rockstars."

== Commercial performance ==
Rebirth debuted at number two on the US Billboard 200 chart, with first week sales of 176,000 copies. This became Wayne's seventh US top-ten album. The album also debuted at number one on the US Top R&B/Hip-Hop Albums and the US Top Rap Albums charts respectively. In its second week, the album dropped to number four on the chart, selling an additional 89,024 copies. In its third week, the album dropped to number five on the chart, selling 59,000 more copies, bringing its three-week total sales to 324,470. The album stayed at number one on Top Rap Albums for six straight weeks. By September 2011, the album has sold 775,000 copies in the US. On September 25, 2020, the album was certified platinum by the Recording Industry Association of America (RIAA) for combined sales and album-equivalent units of over a million units in the United States. Outside of the US, Rebirth also entered at number 24 in the UK and at number 86 in France.

== Track listing ==
| No. | Title | Writer(s) | Producer(s) | Length |
|---|---|---|---|---|
| 1. | "American Star" (featuring Shanell) | Dwayne Carter, Jr.; Johnny Mollings, Lenny Mollings; Shanell Woodgett | DJ Nasty & LVM | 3:37 |
| 2. | "Prom Queen" (featuring Shanell) | Carter, Jr.; Marco Rodríguez-Díaz; Woodgett | DJ Infamous; Drew Correa | 3:37 |
| 3. | "Ground Zero" | Carter, Jr.; Rodríguez-Díaz; Nicholas Warwar | Streetrunner; DJ Infamous | 3:57 |
| 4. | "Da Da Da" | Carter, Jr.; Andre Lyon, Marcello Valenzano; Eddie Montilla | Cool & Dre | 3:40 |
| 5. | "Paradice" | Carter, Jr.; Lyon; Valenzano; Montilla | Kevin Rudolf; Cool & Dre | 3:57 |
| 6. | "Get a Life" | Carter, Jr.; Lyon; Valenzano | Cool & Dre | 3:12 |
| 7. | "On Fire" | Carter, Jr.; Lyon; Valenzano; Montilla; Peter J. Bellotte | Cool & Dre | 4:08 |
| 8. | "Drop the World" (featuring Eminem) | Carter, Jr.; Marshall Mathers; Jesse Woodard; Mike Strange; Chauncey Hollis | Hit-Boy; Chase N. Cashe | 3:49 |
| 9. | "Runnin'" (featuring Shanell) | Carter, Jr.; Kevin Crowe, Erik Ortíz; Woodgett | J.U.S.T.I.C.E. League | 4:31 |
| 10. | "One Way Trip" (featuring Kevin Rudolf) | Carter, Jr.; Kevin Rudolf; Rodríguez-Díaz | Travis Barker; Kevin Rudolf; DJ Infamous | 4:38 |
| 11. | "Knockout" (featuring Nicki Minaj) | Carter, Jr.; Crowe; Ortíz; Onika Maraj | J.U.S.T.I.C.E. League | 4:09 |
| 12. | "The Price Is Wrong" | Carter, Jr.; Rodríguez-Díaz | DJ Infamous | 3:28 |
| Total length: | | | | 46:43 |

Deluxe edition (bonus tracks), Indian Standard Edition & Japanese edition
| No. | Title | Writer(s) | Producer(s) | Length |
|---|---|---|---|---|
| 13. | "I'll Die for You" | Carter, Jr.; Montilla; Lyon; Valenzano | Cool & Dre | 5:07 |
| 14. | "I'm So Over You" (featuring Shanell) | Carter, Jr.; Woodgett; Rodríguez-Díaz | DJ Infamous | 2:58 |
| Total length: | | | | 54:46 |

Rebirth - The Videos
| No. | Title | Length |

Leftover tracks

- "Hot Revolver"
- "Yes" (featuring Pharrell)

== Personnel ==
Credits for Rebirth adapted from AllMusic.

- Sandy Brummels – creative director
- Lil Wayne – vocals, songwriting, primary artist, bass, guitar, executive producer
- Katina Bynum – project manager
- Dwayne "Tha President" Carter – executive producer
- Jonathan Mannion – photography
- Vlado Meller – mastering
- Scott Sandler – logo design
- Mark Santangelo – assistant
- Raheem "Rahlo" Thomas – A&R
- Bryan "Baby Birdman" Williams – executive producer
- Ronald "Slim Tha Don" Williams – executive producer

== Charts ==
=== Weekly charts ===
| Chart (2010) | Peak position |
|---|---|
| Australian Albums Chart | 51 |
| Canadian Albums Chart | 5 |
| Dutch Albums Chart | 75 |
| French Albums Chart | 86 |
| Greek Albums Chart | 28 |
| New Zealand Albums Chart | 33 |
| Norwegian Albums Chart | 40 |
| Swiss Albums Chart | 15 |
| UK Albums Chart | 24 |
| US Billboard 200 | 2 |
| US Top R&B/Hip-Hop Albums (Billboard) | 1 |
| US Top Rap Albums (Billboard) | 1 |

=== Year-end charts ===
| Chart (2010) | Position |
|---|---|
| US Billboard 200 | 34 |
| US Top R&B/Hip-Hop Albums (Billboard) | 10 |
| US Top Rap Albums (Billboard) | 3 |

== Certifications ==
| Region | Certification | Certified units/sales |
|---|---|---|
| United States (RIAA) | Platinum | 1,000,000^{‡} |
^{‡} Sales+streaming figures based on certification alone.
