= Mine (Beyoncé song) =

2013 song by Beyoncé featuring Drake

Song by Beyoncé featuring Drake

from the album Beyoncé
- Recorded: 2013
- Studio: Jungle City Studios (New York City); Oven Studios (New York City)
- Genre: Alternative R&B; hip hop
- Length: 6:18
- Label: Parkwood; Columbia
- Songwriters: Noah Shebib; Aubrey Graham; Beyoncé Knowles; Jordan Ullman; Sidney Brown; Dwane Weir
- Producer: Noah "40" Shebib

Music video
- "Mine" on YouTube

"Mine" is a song recorded by American singer Beyoncé featuring Canadian rapper Drake. The song was written by Noah "40" Shebib, Drake, Beyoncé, Majid Jordan, Sidney "Omen" Brown and Key Wane, with production by Shebib, Jordan, Brown and Beyoncé for the latter's self-titled fifth studio album Beyoncé (2013). "Mine" is an alternative R&B song, that contains trap elements, African beats with muted modern hip hop as well as elements of Afrobeats. Lyrically, Beyoncé reveals her everyday doubts regarding marriage and motherhood.

"Mine" received acclaim from music critics, who praised the song's production, Beyoncé's vocal performance and the song's breakdown. Following the release of the album, "Mine" charted in multiple regions, making appearances on the US Billboard Hot 100 and the UK Singles Charts.

== Background and composition ==
"Mine"
A 28-second sample of "Mine" featuring vocals by Beyoncé

In September 2013, Drake revealed that he was working with Beyoncé on her new project. During an interview with Vibe, he talked about his collaboration with Beyoncé on "Mine", stating, "I had fun with it. I always wanted to write for her. She never really sings that minimal... We'll see where that goes." "Mine" was written by Beyoncé, Noah Shebib, Aubrey Graham, Jordan Ullman, Sidney Brown and Dwane Weir while the production was helmed by Noah "40" Shebib, Majid Jordan, Brown and Beyoncé. Brown also handled additional drum programming, and Beyoncé served as the song's vocal producer. Ramon Rivas engineered the song, and Beyoncé's vocals were recorded by Noah "40" Shebib, while Key Wane provided intro keys and intro programming. The song was finally mixed and mastered by Noel "Gadget" Campbell, Tom Coyne and Aya Merrill. "Mine" was recorded in two studios: Jungle City Studios and Oven Studios, both in New York City.

"Mine" is a futuristic R&B song with a relaxed, jazzy flow, "combining African beats with muted modern hip-hop". Lyrically, Beyoncé reveals her everyday doubts regarding marriage and motherhood, present in the lines, "I'm not feeling like myself since the baby, are we even going to make it? If we are, we're taking this a little too far". She also confesses about going through rough times with a husband after the birth of their daughter, asking the question: "Are we gonna even make it?" in the lines. Many critics opined that the lines were sung about the singer's real-life husband Jay-Z and their daughter Blue Ivy. However, her collaborator Drake manages "to turn the darkness into hope."

== Reception ==
=== Critical reception ===
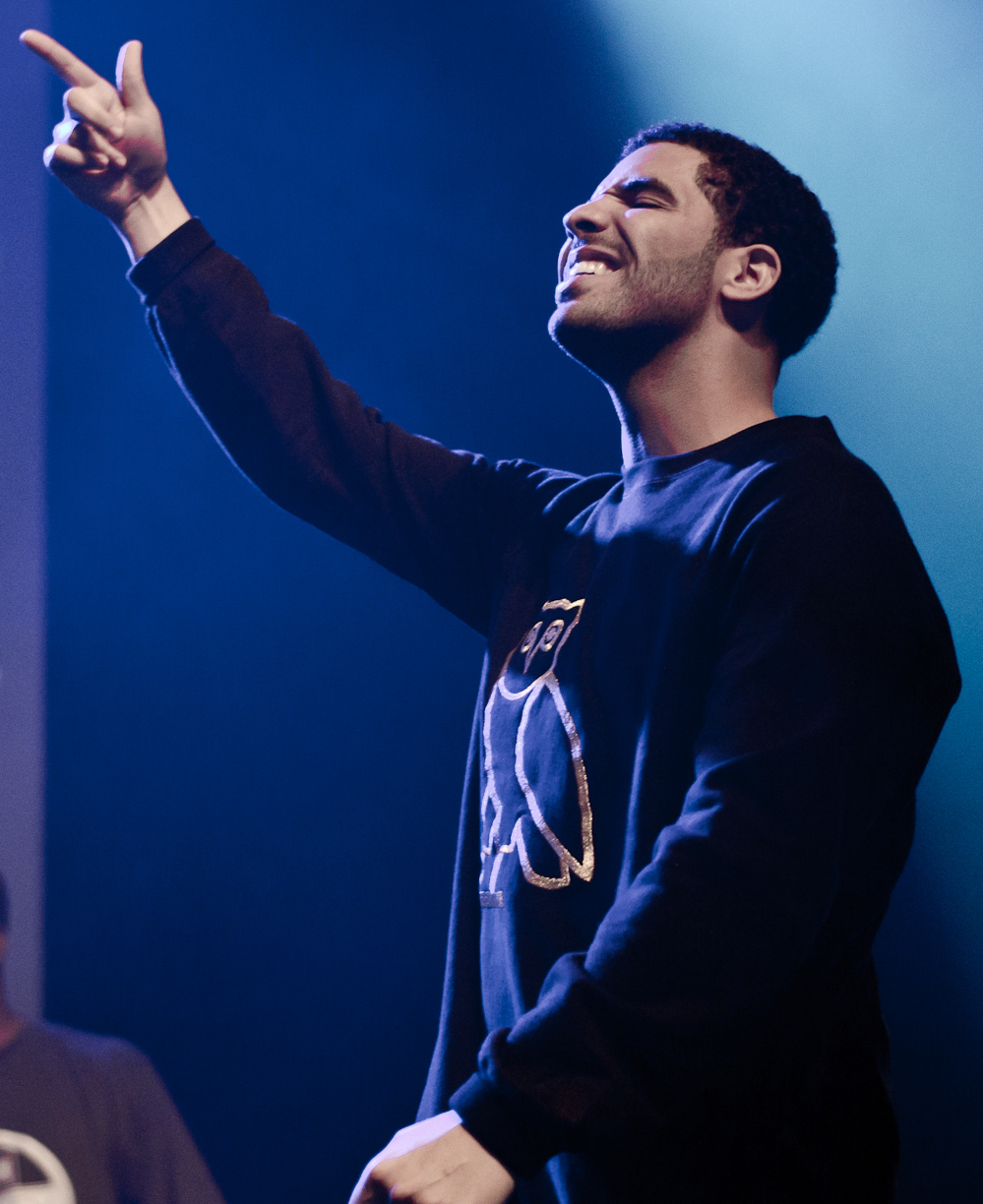
The song features vocals from Canadian rapper Drake. (pictured)

"Mine" was met with acclaim by critics, who described it as one of the highlights on the entire album, described as "excellent" and "utterly thrilling" despite being "largely chorus-free", being mostly praised for how it reflected Beyoncé's determination to keep pushing creatively — a trait Mikael Wood of the Los Angeles Times described as "rare among superstars".

=== Chart performance ===
In the United Kingdom, "Mine" debuted at number 89 on the UK Singles Chart and number eight on the UK R&B Chart on December 28, 2013. The following week, it climbed to number 65 on the singles chart and number seven on the R&B chart which ultimately became its peak positions on those charts. In the United States, "Mine" debuted at number 99 on the Billboard Hot 100 and at number 32 on the Hot R&B/Hip-Hop Songs chart on the chart issue dated January 4, 2014, before rising to numbers 82 and 25, respectively, the following week. Elsewhere, it peaked at number 82 on the Canadian Hot 100 chart where it spent a total of two weeks. In France, it debuted at number 157 on the French Singles Chart on December 28, 2013. The following week, it moved to its peak position of 149 and fell off the chart after that.

== Music video ==
The accompanying music video for "Mine" was shot by Belgian director Pierre Debusschere at Stockton Beach, Australia. It was shot by Melbourne cinematographer Stefan Duscio. The visual was released on December 13, 20,13, to iTunes Store on Beyoncé its, along with sixteen other music videos for every track on the album. On November 24, 2014 it was also uploaded to the singer's Vevo account. Debusschere, who also directed "Ghost" on the Beyoncé album and has previously worked with Kanye West on his musical short film Runaway (2010), said of his collaboration with Beyoncé: "I think Beyoncé came to me because she wanted something other than the usual clips. We shot two videos in a month in Australia. My closest friends knew, but other than that, I had to keep the secret until the end." Picking up on the theme of isolation from the lyrics that begins the song, the video references two works of art: Michelangelo's sculpture "Pietà", and René Magritte's painting "The Lovers" (1928). During the first part of the video, Beyoncé is shown wearing a veil and a gown, sitting with a dancer covered in white paint resting their head on her lap, and with a mask on her face, which she puts on, with the statue's peaceful expression. René Magritte's painting, like the video, shows a couple kissing with their heads enshrouded by white fabric. "The Lovers" was on display as part of a retrospective at New York's Museum of Modern Art at the time of the video's release. In the case of the music video, the shirts are inscribed with the words "Yours" and "Mine".

== Live performances ==
Beyoncé performed "Mine" at [2014 MTV Video Music Awards held on August 25, as part of a medley consisting of songs from her fifth studio album. She opened her 15-minute performance at the show with "Mine", surrounded by various dancers with white skin and the song's title displayed on a screen behind her in blue flame. She wore a bejeweled bodysuit and stained-glassed window visuals were shown on the stage. As she finished the performance of "Mine", she announced to the crowd, "MTV, welcome to my world", continuing with a performance of "Haunted". Nadeska Alexis writing for MTV News felt that Beyoncé managed to open the show in an emotional way with the cameras focusing on her face at the beginning. Hilary Hughes writing for Fuse praised the fact that the singer opened the show with "Mine", saying it was "enough to halt all conversation, silence all phones and pause the internet for a moment, as she got real right off the bat". The song is part of The Formation World Tour setlist.

== Personnel ==
Credits adapted from Beyoncé's website.

- Beyoncé Knowles – vocals, vocal production
- Drake – vocals
- Sampha – additional vocals
- Noah "40" Shebib – production, recording
- Majid Jordan – additional production
- Sidney "Omen" Brown – additional production, additional drum programming
- Noel Cadastre – recording
- Stuart White – recording
- Ramon Rivas – second engineering
- Key Wane – intro keys and intro programming
- Noel "Gadget" Campbell – mixing
- Tom Coyne – mastering
- Aya Merrill – mastering

== Charts ==
Chart (2013–2014)	Peak position
Canada Hot 100 (Billboard)	82
France (SNEP)	149
UK Singles (OCC)	65
UK Hip Hop/R&B (Official Charts)	7
US Billboard Hot 100	82
US Hot R&B/Hip-Hop Songs (Billboard)	25

== Certifications ==
Region	Certification	Certified units/sales
Canada (Music Canada)	Gold	40,000^{‡}
United States (RIAA)	Platinum	1,000,000^{‡}
^{‡} Sales+streaming figures based on certification alone.

== Cover versions ==
In 2015, American rock band Third Eye Blind released a cover of the song with an accompanying music video.
