= Hot Revolver =

2009 single by Lil Wayne and Cool & Dre

Single by Lil Wayne
- Released: March 17, 2009
- Recorded: 2008
- Length: 3:11 (single version); 4:46 (extended version)
- Label: Young Money, Cash Money, Universal Motown
- Songwriters: Dwayne Carter, Jr., Andre Lyon
- Producer: Cool & Dre

Lil Wayne singles chronology
"Every Girl" (2009)	"Hot Revolver" (2009)	"Always Strapped" (2009)

"Hot Revolver" is a song by the American recording artist Lil Wayne, released March 17, 2009. The song, produced by American production duo Cool & Dre, features uncredited guest vocals from Dre. The song was originally intended to be included on Lil Wayne's Rebirth album in 2010, but it was left off the final track listing. An extended version of the song with an extra verse later leaked online on March 26, 2009.

== Background ==
Despite speculation that the song featured fellow Cash Money artist Kevin Rudolf, it was confirmed that the featured artist on the song was indeed Dre of production duo Cool & Dre.

== Track listing ==
iTunes Digital download

1. "Hot Revolver (Main)" — 3:11

== Charts ==
Chart (2009)	Peak position
Canada Hot 100 (Billboard)	54
UK Hip Hop/R&B (Official Charts)	32
UK Singles (OCC)	132
US Billboard Hot 100	33

== Certifications ==
Region	Certification	Certified units/sales
United States (RIAA)	Gold	500,000^{‡}
^{‡} Sales+streaming figures based on certification alone.

== Rerecorded version ==
"Hot Revolver"

Song by Lil Wayne featuring Dre

from the album I Am Not a Human Being II
- Released: March 26, 2013
- Length: 3:20
- Label: Young Money, Cash Money, Republic
- Songwriters: Dwayne Carter, Jr., Andre Lyon, Marcello Valenzano, Billie Joe Armstrong, Frank Wright III, Michael Pritchard
- Producer: Cool & Dre

The rerecorded version of the song is released on March 26, 2013 as the bonus track on his tenth studio album I Am Not a Human Being II. This version features a new verse from Wayne and does not feature AutoTune unlike the original version. Dre is now credited as a feature artist.
