= I Am Not a Human Being =

Studio album by Lil Wayne
- Released: September 27, 2010
- Recorded: 2008–2010
- Genre: Hip-hop
- Length: 55:42
- Labels: Young Money; Cash Money; Universal Motown
- Producers: Lil Wayne (exec.); Cortez Bryant (exec.); Ronald "Slim" Williams (exec.); Birdman (exec.); The Runners; Kane Beatz; DJ Infamous; The Olympicks; Tha Bizness; Cool & Dre; Jahlil Beats; Rondell “Mr.Beatz” Cobbs; Streetrunner; Drew Correa; Noah "40" Shebib; DVLP; Boi-1da; Mr. Pyro; Mike Banger; Matthew Burnett

Lil Wayne chronology
Rebirth (2010)	I Am Not a Human Being (2010)	Sorry 4 the Wait (2011)

Singles from I Am Not a Human Being
- 1. "I'm Single" Released: May 10, 2010; 2. "Right Above It" Released: August 17, 2010

I Am Not a Human Being is the eighth studio album by the American rapper Lil Wayne. It had a digital release on September 27, 2010, Wayne's 28th birthday, and on compact disc on October 12, 2010, by Young Money Entertainment, Cash Money Records and Universal Motown. It was recorded before Wayne's eight-month prison term for criminal possession of a weapon. Production for the album was by Wayne and several record producers, including Boi-1da, Cool & Dre, Streetrunner, Noah "40" Shebib and DJ Infamous.

Upon its release, I Am Not a Human Being received generally positive reviews from music critics, who drew comparisons to Wayne's earlier works and considered the album to be an improvement over his previous album, Rebirth. The album debuted at number two on the US Billboard 200 chart, with first-week digital sales alone. Following its physical release, it topped the chart, becoming Wayne's second US number-one album and the first studio album since Tupac's Me Against the World in 1995 to reach the top position on the Billboard 200 while its artist was in prison. Its lead single, "Right Above It", became a top-ten hit in the United States. The album has been certified platinum by the Recording Industry Association of America (RIAA).

== Background ==
On August 4, 2010, Billboard announced that Lil Wayne would release an EP called I Am Not a Human Being and a single from the EP called "Right Above It". The single debuted on DJ Funkmaster Flex's show, which Lil Wayne called and gave an interview. The album is a prelude to Lil Wayne's album Tha Carter IV.

"I'm putting out a [Wayne] album called I Am Not a Human Being and I'll probably drop it on his birthday, September 27...I'm not even putting it out in stores. We just gonna put it out virally and maybe package it up for Christmas. Give 'em a hard copy later for fan appreciation."

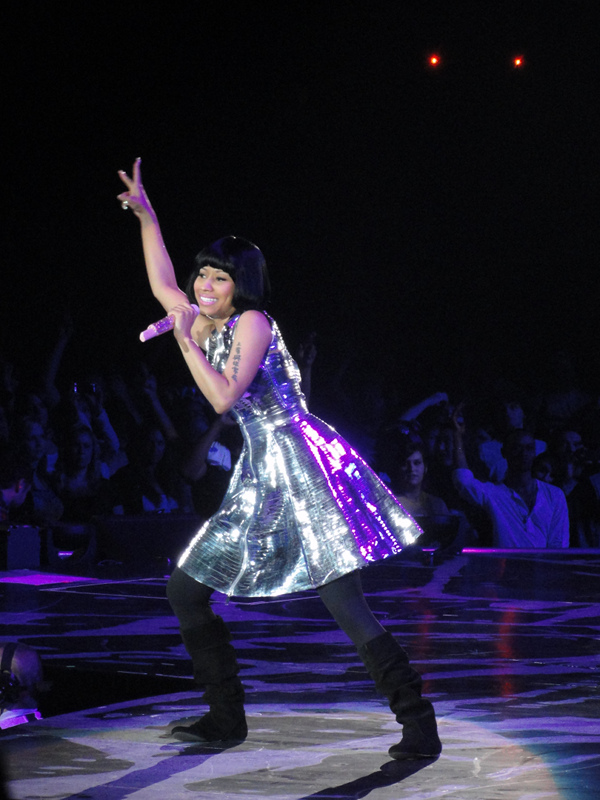
Nicki Minaj was featured on the songs "What's Wrong with Them" and "YM Salute"

Drake, Jay Sean, Lil Twist, Nicki Minaj, Jae Millz, Tyga, Gudda Gudda, Lil Chuckee and T-Streets are all guests on the album.

Vibe magazine spoke with the DJ Scoob Doo about Tha Carter IV and I Am Not a Human Being, who said, "I got videos for the Carter IV and the I’m not a Human Being EP all ready. I can’t say the name of the song but Wayne was singing on the hook, but they’re getting Drake to re-do it and it’s off the Human Being EP,” Scoob Doo says. “Carter IV is probably the best album I’ve heard in the last decade, but Wayne is such a different artist now that he wants to record new music when he comes home. The stuff he’s talking about now is just on another level. That’s why a lot of the songs on the EP were originally taken from the Carter IV.”

Lil Wayne's manager Cortez Bryant told SPIN that I Am Not a Human Being would actually be a full-length album. Initially, the tracks were to be appear on Tha Carter IV, but Wayne decided to put the old tracks on the album so new music could be recorded for Tha Carter IV.

He uses no autotune on the album: according to Birdman, it's just "raw rap".

The production to bonus track "YM Salute" was originally recorded by Young Jeezy and Ester Dean as potential material for Young Jeezy's forthcoming album TM 103.

The song "I Don't Like The Look Of It" was originally released on Gudda Gudda's 2010 mixtape "Back 2 Guddaville" with a different beat under the title "Willy Wonka". The instrumental was changed when it was released on this album due to sample clearance issues.

== Release and promotion ==
The last three tracks featured on the album's physical CD release, "YM Banger", "YM Salute", and "I Don't Like The Look Of It", were not initially included on the digital download version of the album: however, after the physical CD version was released, the tracks were added to the digital version of the album.

The album's lead single, "Right Above It" featuring Drake, was released to iTunes on August 17, 2010. The song debuted at number six on the US Billboard Hot 100, and at number one on the Billboard Hot Digital Songs chart.

"What's Wrong With Them" received strong download sales in the UK during the album's release and as such, the track charted on the UK R&B Chart, peaking at number 27.

== Critical reception ==
Professional ratings
Aggregate scores
Source	Rating
AnyDecentMusic?	6.8/10
Metacritic	67/100
Review scores
Source	Rating
AllMusic	3.5/5 stars
The A.V. Club	B−
Entertainment Weekly	C
Los Angeles Times	2/4 stars
NME	7/10
Pitchfork	6.7/10
Rolling Stone	4/5 stars
Slant Magazine	2.5/5 stars
Spin	6/10
USA Today	3/4 stars

I Am Not a Human Being received generally positive reviews from music critics. At Metacritic, which assigns a normalized rating out of 100 to reviews from mainstream critics, the album received an average score of 67, based on 17 reviews. AllMusic's David Jeffries stated, "This is too short and scattered to put on his top shelf, but it comes awfully close, which is downright astonishing considering the circumstances." Luke Bainsbridge of The Observer called the album "a return to classic Weezy". Rolling Stone writer Jody Rosen commended its "unadulterated fun" and Wayne's "irrepressibly wacked-out spirit", writing that the album "has the loose-limbed feel of the rapper's many mixtapes". Nathan Rabin of The A.V. Club commented that, "though Human Being feels more like a mix-tape stopgap than a proper album, it's nevertheless full of intriguing experiments and infectious tracks." Ben Detrick of Spin found its production "unfashionable", but stated "Though this is a flawed and scattershot project, Wayne remains an artist who makes music like a pâtissier–his songs are frivolous, delicious, and meant to be relished for just a moment". In his Consumer Guide, Robert Christgau gave the album a three-star honorable mention, picking out three songs from the album ("I Am Not a Human Being", "Popular" and "I'm Single"), and said of Lil Wayne, "His throwaways beat their keepers, from solitary yet, but the true classics are all in the middle and the Young Money promos are filler." Uncut gave the album four stars out of five and called it "a far superior effort [than Rebirth]." Billboard gave it a score of 77 out of 100 and said it was "not as experimental as the rapper's previous rock-tinged "Rebirth" set that arrived earlier this year, and most fans will likely appreciate this." Wilson McBee of Prefix Magazine gave the album a score of 7.5 out of ten and said that "For most of [the album], it seems like Wayne has forgotten how to write a verse. He's all about couplets now."

Los Angeles Times writer Jeff Weiss noted a "creative languor" and wrote, "Wayne reveals he’s mortal after all." Pitchfork's Ryan Dombal wrote, "We get Wayne spouting classic Weezy-isms—explicit sex, cartoonish gunplay, and allusions to the intricacies of the digestive system abound—over at-least-decent original beats", but noted that "there's a lingering sense that the rapper is not in top gear; his flow is often slow and static, his wordplay lively yet less energized than what we're now used to." Entertainment Weekly's Brad Wete called the album "stale" and wrote that "none of the new songs on this set hold a candle to [No Ceilings], much less... Tha Carter III". Andy Gill of The Independent gave the album three stars out of five and called it "a perfunctory affair". The Boston Globe's Julian Benbow wrote that "the sharper moments [...] are drowned out by the redundant ones". Jon Caramanica of The New York Times called it "an uncentered collection of odds and ends", writing that "Too often Lil Wayne lapses into predictable flow structures, quick ideas paired with built-in rejoinders: 'They say money talks/ but it’s my spokesperson,' and so on". Slant's Jesse Cataldo perceived "half-assed rhyme work" from Wayne and called it "kind of a crummy album, rife with laziness and repetition ... It may have a decidedly lazy presentation, but I Am Not a Human Being inevitably succeeds at what it sets out to do: remind us of Wayne's artistic validity and whetting our appetite for more." David Pott-Negrine of Drowned in Sound gave it a score of six out of ten and said, "It may not be a great or even particularly good album, but it does at least tide us over until Weezy become[s] a free man, and the much talked about Tha Carter IV finally sees the light of day." Sean L. Maloney of American Songwriter gave the album two-and-a-half stars out of five and said of Lil Wayne, "he's just killing time with sub-par versions of his far more popular songs – this is a completely superfluous release that lacks the relevance and immediacy of his mixtape works and the quality-control of his albums."

== Commercial performance ==
I Am Not a Human Being debuted at number two on the US Billboard 200 chart, selling 110,000 digital copies in its first week. In its second week, it dropped to number 16 on the chart, selling an additional 23,000 digital copies. Following its CD release on October 12, the album moved up to number one on the chart, selling 125,000 copies in its third week. It became Lil Wayne's second number-one album and his seventh top-ten album in the US. By September 2011, the album had sold 953,000 in the US and 1.6 million copies worldwide. On September 25, 2020, the album was certified platinum by the Recording Industry Association of America (RIAA) for combined sales and album-equivalent units of over a million units in the United States.

== Track listing ==
No.	Title	Writer(s)	Producer(s)	Length
1.	"Gonorrhea" (featuring Drake)	Dwayne Carter, Jr.; Aubrey Graham; Daniel Johnson; Hide	Kane Beatz; Filthy (co.)	4:22
2.	"Hold Up" (featuring T-Streets)	Carter; Jesse James; Keith Miller; Brian Parker; David Stokes; Brian Wicker	The Olympicks	4:11
3.	"With You" (featuring Drake)	Carter; Graham; Nicholas Warwar; Michael Aiello	Streetrunner	3:49
4.	"I Am Not a Human Being"	Carter; Andrews Correa; Marco Rodriguez-Diaz	Infamous; Drew Correa	4:05
5.	"I'm Single"	Carter; Graham; Noah Shebib; Sidney Brown; Christopher Gibson; Matthew Samuels; Dalton Tennant	Noah "40" Shebib; Omen (co.)	5:33
6.	"What's Wrong with Them" (featuring Nicki Minaj)	Carter; Onika Maraj; Bigram Zayas	Develop	3:31
7.	"Right Above It" (featuring Drake)	Carter; Graham; Johnson; Andrew Canton	Kane Beatz	4:32
8.	"Popular" (featuring Lil Twist)	Carter; Andre Lyon; Christopher Moore; Marcello Valenzano	Cool & Dre	4:40
9.	"That Ain't Me" (featuring Jay Sean)	Carter; Warwar; Kamaljit Jhooti; Roger Pasco; Aiello	Streetrunner	4:03
10.	"Bill Gates"	Carter; Matthew Samuels; Matthew Burnett	Boi-1da; Burnett (add.)	4:19
11.	"YM Banger" (featuring Gudda Gudda, Jae Millz and Tyga)	Carter; Carl Lilly; Jarvis Mills; Michael Stevenson	Mike Banger	3:55
12.	"YM Salute" (featuring Lil Twist, Lil Chuckee, Gudda Gudda, Jae Millz and Nicki Minaj)	Carter; Daen Simmons; Maraj; Moore; Lilly; Mills; Rashad Ballard	Mr. Pyro	5:14
13.	"I Don't Like the Look of It" (featuring Gudda Gudda)	Carter; Lilly; Rondell Cobbs II	Mr. Beatz	3:18
Total length:				55:42

• (co.) Co-producer
• (add.) Additional production

== Personnel ==
Credits for I Am Not a Human Being adapted from AllMusic.

- Alton Bates Jr. – recording assistant
- Joshua Berkman – A&R
- Boi-1da – producer
- Cortez Bryant – executive producer
- Matthew Burnett – additional production
- Michael "Banger" Cadahia – engineer, mixing, producer
- Noel Cadastre – mixing assistant
- Dwayne "Tha President" Carter – executive producer
- Ariel Chobaz – engineer
- Cool – producer
- Andrews Correa – engineer
- Drew Correa – producer
- DJ Folk – production co-ordination
- Elizabeth Gallardo – mixing assistant
- Brian "Big Bass" Gardner – mastering
- I.L.O. – additional production, keyboards
- DJ Infamous – producer
- Kane Beatz – producer
- Edward "Jewfro" Lidow – recording assistant
- Mack Maine – executive producer
- Mr. Beatz – producer
- Mr. Pyro – producer
- The Olympics – producer
- Fareed Salamah – digital editing
- Noah Shebib – engineer, mixing, producer
- Streetrunner – producer
- Finis "KY" White – engineer
- Bryan "Baby Birdman" Williams – executive producer
- Ronald "Slim Tha Don" Williams – executive producer
- Kevin Zulueta – engineer

== Charts ==
=== Weekly charts ===
Chart (2010)	Peak position
Australian Albums Chart	60
Belgium Albums Chart (Wallonia)	99
Canadian Albums Chart	4
French Albums Chart	167
Swiss Albums Chart	46
UK Albums Chart	56
UK R&B Chart	8
US Billboard 200	1
US Digital Albums (Billboard)	1
US Top R&B/Hip-Hop Albums (Billboard)	1
US Top Rap Albums (Billboard)	1

=== Year-end charts ===
Chart (2010)	Position
US Billboard 200	60
US Top R&B/Hip-Hop Albums (Billboard)	20
US Top Rap Albums (Billboard)	10

Chart (2011)	Position
US Billboard 200	47
US Top R&B/Hip-Hop Albums (Billboard)	13
US Top Rap Albums (Billboard)	9

=== Decade-end charts ===
Chart (2010–2019)	Position
US Billboard 200	194

== Certifications ==
Region	Certification	Certified units/sales
United States (RIAA)	2× Platinum	2,000,000^{‡}
^{‡} Sales+streaming figures based on certification alone.

== Release history ==
Country	Date	Format	Label
United States	September 27, 2010	Digital download	Young Money, Cash Money, Universal Motown
United States	October 12, 2010	CD	Young Money, Cash Money, Universal Motown
United Kingdom	October 18, 2010	CD	Young Money, Cash Money, Universal Island
United Kingdom	October 22, 2010	Digital download	Young Money, Cash Money, Universal Island
