= I'm Single =

Single by Lil Wayne

from the album No Ceilings and I Am Not a Human Being
- Released: October 31, 2009
- Recorded: 2009
- Genre: Hip hop
- Length: 5:33
- Label: Young Money; Cash Money; Universal Motown
- Songwriters: Dwayne Carter; Aubrey "Drake" Graham
- Producers: Noah "40" Shebib; Omen (co.)

Lil Wayne singles chronology
| "I Made It (Cash Money Heroes)" (2010) | "I'm Single" (2009) | "Right Above It" (2010) |

"I'm Single" is a song by American rapper Lil Wayne, released as a single from his ninth solo mixtape, No Ceilings, and is also included on his eighth studio album I Am Not a Human Being. The song is produced by Noah "40" Shebib, with co-production from Omen. The song received generally positive reviews from music critics on its release, who complimented its relaxed, downbeat tone and also the production from Shebib and Omen.

== Background ==
The song was originally released under the name "Single" on No Ceilings: however, after the song was released as a digital single, the title was changed. A remix of the song featuring Drake was set to appear on I Am Not a Human Being: however, for unspecified reasons the original version was included instead, although Drake still receives a featured artist credit on the song.

== Reception ==
The song received generally positive reviews from music critics. Allmusic writer David Jeffries described the song as a "woozy porno dream", and named it one of three "killer cuts" from the album "driven by Wayne's luck with the ladies". Chris Molnar of cokemachineglow also wrote positively of the song, praising the "confidently opportunistic" lyrics and the "eerie" production and described the song itself as "a riveting, alien slow jam... an example of how mixtape Wayne and album Wayne can collide perfectly in these dark days of prisoner Wayne." Jon Caramanica of The New York Times called it "hypnotic" and "no-fi", describing it as "his most Drake-like record, woozy and sentimental... it’s a testament to his truly elastic capacities that he’s able to absorb Drake’s skill and template but not be fully reshaped by it."

== Track listing ==
- Digital download'
1. "I'm Single – 5:33

== Charts ==
=== Weekly charts ===
| Chart (2010) | Peak position |
|---|---|
| US Billboard Hot 100 | 82 |
| US Hot R&B/Hip-Hop Songs (Billboard) | 38 |
| US Hot Rap Songs (Billboard) | 23 |

=== Year-end charts ===
| Chart (2010) | Position |
|---|---|
| US Hot R&B/Hip-Hop Songs (Billboard) | 97 |

== Certifications ==
| Region | Certification | Certified units/sales |
|---|---|---|
| United States (RIAA) | Platinum | 1,000,000^{‡} |
^{‡} Sales+streaming figures based on certification alone.

== Release history ==
| Country | Date | Format | Label |
|---|---|---|---|
| United Kingdom | May 10, 2010 | Digital download | Young Money, Cash Money, Universal Motown |
| United States | May 11, 2010 | Digital download | Young Money, Cash Money, Universal Motown |
| United States | May 24, 2010 | Urban contemporary radio | Young Money, Cash Money, Universal Motown |
