= Cocaine Model =

Song by Zhu

from the EP The Nightday
- Released: April 20, 2014
- Genre: House; Deep house
- Label: Mind of a Genius

"Cocaine Model" is a track by American electronic music producer Zhu from his debut EP The Nightday (2014). Along with "Faded", it was one of his breakout tracks.

== Description ==
The song tells about a globetrotting girl who's wearing French designer label Isabel Marant. She is described as "from Morocco by the way of South Chicago / graduated in the Bay / had her birthday in LA." It features Zhu's "soulful vocals and combining them with techy synths," then transcending into a "groovy bass-line, replete with deep beats."

== Reception ==
The track received positive reviews both at the time of its release and retrospectively. The Independent wrote: "Soft vocals describe a mysterious girl whose globetrotting sounds as exotic as the beats." Conor Clarke of Earmilk described it as "a lighter, more laid-back summer song" than other tracks in the EP. Billboard described it as "contemplative." The San Diego Union-Tribune’s Liz Bowen found its melody "smooth, flowing" and praised Zhu's vocals as "unbelievable" with "his pitch high enough to rival that of Whitney Houston." Pitchfork’s Rebecca Haithcoat said it the track is "as bright and glittery as the sky in Joshua Tree." Aurora Mitchell of The Line of Best Fit called it a "sultry and playful track [that] revels in seductive sampling, shuffling beats backed by a hefty bassline and soulful vocals." George O'Brien, also writing for The Line of Best Fit, described it as "a floating, loungey highlight; a summer soundtrack with typical allure and a sparkling chorus", where "the vocal pines above brilliantly tidy production." Dancing Astronaut's Fred Hwang called it "the hidden gem" of the EP, praising its production and musicianship. Another Dancing Astronaut reviewer, Rachel Narozniak, praied the "sensual filminess" of Zhu's "silky vocals."

In 2017, Billboard ranked it No. 9 among Zhu's best 10 songs. Zhu "layers vibes on vibes here", singing "atop plush pads and dreamy melodies", wrote David Rishty. Steven Mason, writing for Relentless Beats, aruged that what makes it "a great song is the perfect harmony of bouncy house basslines and gloomy synths." Glasse Factory's Kelly Cheng called it a "moody house anthem."

== Music video ==
A music video was released on May 11, 2015. As of December 2025, it has over 78 million views. Directed by Zhu, Ryan Middleton of MusicTimes.com described it as "an avant-garde interpretation of the song." Shot on site at the New York Fashion Week, it follows models, including Shaun Ross. Run The Trap wrote that it has "a real trippy feel."
