= A Place Like This =

A Place Like This may refer to:

- A Place Like This (album), a 1988 album by Robbie Nevil
- A Place Like This (EP), a 2014 EP by Majid Jordan
- "A Place Like This" (song), a 2014 song by Majid Jordan
