= The Nightday =

EP by Zhu
- Released: April 20, 2014
- Genre: House, electronic, dance
- Label: Mind of a Genius; Columbia; Spinnin'

Zhu chronology
The Nightday (2014)	Genesis Series EP (2015)

Singles from The Nightday
- 1. "Faded" Released: April 20, 2014

The Nightday is the debut EP by Chinese-American electronic musician Zhu and was released in Australia on April 20, 2014 through Mind of a Genius.

== Background ==
Zhu's first track, "Moves Like Ms Jackson", a mashup of several songs by Outkast, was released in February 2014 and was positively received by blogs and reviewers covering electronic music. This led to the release of The Nightday, his first EP, in April 2014.

== Critical reception ==
Sly Steve from Blank Gold Coast said; "This is the perfect late night record with both down tempo and head nodding tones. 'Nightday' is a real stand out in the modern electronic revival".

Robbie Russell from VRS Mag said; "The EP in general is a genre defying romp through just about everything that's been popular on the internet in the past 10 years. Melding house, hip-hop and trap; Zhu is able to create a body of work that not only doesn't have a face, but doesn't have a category to be dumped into either." and concluded with "[it's]... odd but it works".

The Beat Report said; "Across six tracks filled with cascading liquid synths, propulsive beats and slinky vocals hooks, 'THE NIGHTDAY' showcases the unbridled creativity and enticing allure at the core of ZHUs craft. Drawing from a range of dance music genres from house to disco to garage to hip-hop and synth-pop, coupled with his distinctly captivating voice, ZHU spins these elements into a potent concoction entirely of his own".

Jake Cappuccino from In Your Speakers said; "For a debut EP, ZHU has produced an admirable work. There are not many, if any, flagrant faults to point to on this record. It might be too unusual and a little too different for mass appreciation, but this is one record where trying out different sounds worked out positively. The beats are steady, the samples are funky, the vocals are smooth counterparts to the dark, grungy bass, and many of the tracks are head nodding and get-up-and-dance good on ZHU's 'Nightday' EP".

== Singles ==
- "Faded" was released on April 20, 2014 as the first single and charted in top 5 in Australia and Great Britain.

== Track listing ==
Digital download EP
No.	Title	Writer(s)	Length
1.	"Stay Closer"	Steven Zhu	4:32
2.	"Faded"	Steven Zhu	3:43
3.	"Paradise Awaits"	Steven Zhu	3:33
4.	"Superfriends"	Steven Zhu	4:21
5.	"The One"	Steven Zhu	5:02
6.	"Cocaine Model"	Steven Zhu	4:15

== Charts ==
The Nightday debuted in Australia at number 20 and peaked at number 6 in early June.

Chart (2014)	Peak position
Australian Albums (ARIA)	6
Belgian Albums (Ultratop Flanders)	136
Belgian Albums (Ultratop Wallonia)	167

== Release history ==
Region	Date	Format	Label
Australia	April 20, 2014	Digital download	Mind of a Genius
