= Ology (album) =

- Digital cover

Studio album by Gallant
- Released: April 6, 2016
- Studio: Venice Way (Venice); Pulse (Malibu); Record Plant (Los Angeles); Mind of a Genius (Culver City); The Equation; Linear Labs
- Genre: Alternative R&B
- Length: 52:41
- Label: Mind of a Genius; Warner Bros.
- Producer: Josh Abraham; Bordeaux; Ebrahim Lakhani; Maths Times Joy; Patrizio Moi; Oligee; Stint; Adrian Younge

Gallant chronology
Zebra (2014)	Ology (2016)	Sweet Insomnia (2019)

Singles from Ology
- 1. "Weight in Gold" Released: June 26, 2015; 2. "Skipping Stones" Released: February 5, 2016

Professional ratings
Aggregate scores
Source	Rating
Metacritic	76/100
Review scores
Source	Rating
AllMusic	3.5/5 stars

Ology is the debut studio album by American R&B singer Gallant. It was released on April 6, 2016, by Mind of a Genius Records and Warner Bros. Records. The album was supported by the singles "Weight in Gold" and "Skipping Stones", featuring Jhené Aiko. Upon its release, Ology received positive reviews from most music critics, who complimented its innovative style and praised Gallant for his singing and songwriting.

== Singles ==
His official debut single, titled "Weight in Gold" was released on June 26, 2015. The song was produced by Stint. The second single, "Skipping Stones", was released on February 5, 2016.

== Critical reception ==
Ology received generally positive reviews from music critics. At Metacritic, which assigns a normalized rating out of 100 to reviews from mainstream publications, the album received an average score of 76, based on 5 reviews. The Guardian writer Lenre Bakare noted that "if this is what R&B's future looks like it's brighter than ever". In a mixed review Q Magazine's Eric Henderson found the album "not a straightforward journey, then, but still a rewarding one".

=== Accolades ===
Ology was nominated for a Grammy Award for Best Urban Contemporary Album, at the 59th Annual Grammy Awards in 2017.

== Track listing ==
No.	Title	Writer(s)	Producer(s)	Length
1.	"First"	Christopher Gallant III; Ajay Bhattacharyya	Stint	0:37
2.	"Talking to Myself"	Gallant; Bhattacharyya; Arthur Jones	Stint	3:57
3.	"Shotgun"	Gallant; Bhattacharyya	Stint	3:17
4.	"Bourbon"	Gallant; Josh Abraham; Oliver Goldstein	Abraham; Oligee	4:39
5.	"Bone + Tissue"	Gallant; Bhattacharyya	Stint	3:41
6.	"Oh, Universe"	Gallant; Patrizio Moi	Moi	1:02
7.	"Weight in Gold"	Gallant; Bhattacharyya	Stint	3:23
8.	"Episode"	Gallant; Joseph Postiglione; Steven Zhu	Bordeaux; Zhu^{[a]}	4:36
9.	"Miyazaki"	Gallant; Yannick Beaucaine; Darryl Brown; Ebrahim Lakhani; Amel Larrieux; Bryce Wilson	Lakhani	2:12
10.	"Counting"	Gallant; Bhattacharyya	Stint	4:34
11.	"Percogesic"	Gallant; Bhattacharyya; Willis Norman	Stint	4:12
12.	"Jupiter"	Gallant; Timothy James	Maths Time Joy	4:36
13.	"Open Up"	Gallant; Bhattacharyya	Stint	4:37
14.	"Skipping Stones" (featuring Jhené Aiko)	Gallant; Aiko; Bhattacharyya; Adrian Younge	Stint; Younge	3:04
15.	"Chandra"	Gallant; Moi	Moi; Gallant^{[a]}^{[v]}	3:43
16.	"Last"	Gallant; Bhattacharyya	Stint	0:31
Total length:				52:41

Notes

- ^{^[a]} signifies an additional producer.
- ^{^[v]} signifies a vocal producer.

== Charts ==
=== Album ===
Ology weekly chart performance
Chart (2016)	Peak position
UK R&B Albums (Official Charts Company)	34
US Top R&B/Hip-Hop Albums (Billboard)	39
US Heatseekers Albums (Billboard)	17
US Independent Albums (Billboard)	50
US R&B Albums (Billboard)	18

=== Songs ===
Song chart performance
Title	Year	Peak chart positions
Title	Year	US Adult R&B
"Weight in Gold"	2016	21

== Personnel ==
Musicians

- Gallant – vocals
- Ajay Bhattacharyya – drum programming (tracks 1, 2, 5, 11, 13), bass (2, 3, 5, 7, 10, 11, 13), synthesizer (2, 5, 7, 10, 11, 13); piano, horns (2, 3), drums (3, 7, 10); guitar, strings (3, 7); synthesizer programming (3), sampling (5, 13), Rhodes (7, 11, 13), programming (7, 11, 16); percussion, harp, keyboards (10); vibraphone (14)
- A. J. Novak – drums, percussion (5)
- Cole DeGenova – piano (5)
- William Leong – guitar (10)
- Adrian Younge – all instruments except vibraphone (14)

Technical

- Ajay Bhattacharyya – mixing (1), recording (1–3, 5, 7, 10, 11, 14, 16)
- Tony Maserati – mixing (2–11, 13, 15)
- Adrian Younge – mixing (14)
- A. J. Novak – engineering
- Patrizio Moi – recording (6)
- Maths Time Joy – recording (13)
