= Dreamland 2021 =

Studio album by Zhu
- Released: April 30, 2021
- Recorded: 2021
- Genre: Electronic
- Length: 45:01
- Label: Astralwerks
- Producer: Zhu

Zhu chronology
Ringos Desert (2018)	Dreamland 2021 (2021)	Musical Chairs Mixtape (Vol. 1) (2022)

Singles from Dreamland 2021
- 1. "Sky Is Crying (feat. Yuna)" Released: March 26, 2021; 2. "Yours (with Arctic Lake)" Released: April 28, 2021

Dreamland 2021 is the third studio album by American electronic music producer Zhu, released on April 30, 2021 via the label Astralwerks. The album features vocals from Yuna, Arctic Lake, Tinashe, Channel Tres, partywithray and Kota the Friend.

== Chart performance ==
The album debuted at number 11 on the Billboard Top Dance/Electronic Albums chart. The single "Sky is Crying (feat. Yuna)" peaked at No. 39 on the US dance chart.

== Track listing ==
No.	Title	Writer(s)	Length
1.	"Lost It"	Frederick Janney; Mitch Bell; Steven Zhu	2:58
2.	"Distant Lights"	Aaron Leibowitz; Bell; Zhu	4:07
3.	"Blue Dream"	Zhu	2:26
4.	"How Does It Feel" (featuring Channel Tres)	Leibowitz; Bell; Sheldon Young; Zhu	3:08
5.	"Sky is Crying" (featuring Yuna)	Leibowitz; Yuna; Zhu	4:24
6.	"Sweet Like Honey"	Zhu	4:03
7.	"Yours" (with Arctic Lake)	Emma Foster; Bell; Zhu	4:17
8.	"SOCO"	Zhu	3:34
9.	"ONLY"	Tinashe; Zhu	3:50
10.	"Zhudio54" (featuring partywithray)	Janney; Zhu	3:50
11.	"Good4U" (featuring Kota the Friend)	Avery Jones; Jon Hume; Nicolas Chiari; Zhu	4:20
12.	"I Need That"	Leibowitz; Bell; Zhu	3:59
Total length:			45:01

== Charts ==
Chart (2021)	Peak position
US Top Dance/Electronic Albums (Billboard)	11
