= Jaymes Young =

American singer-songwriter and musician (born 1991)

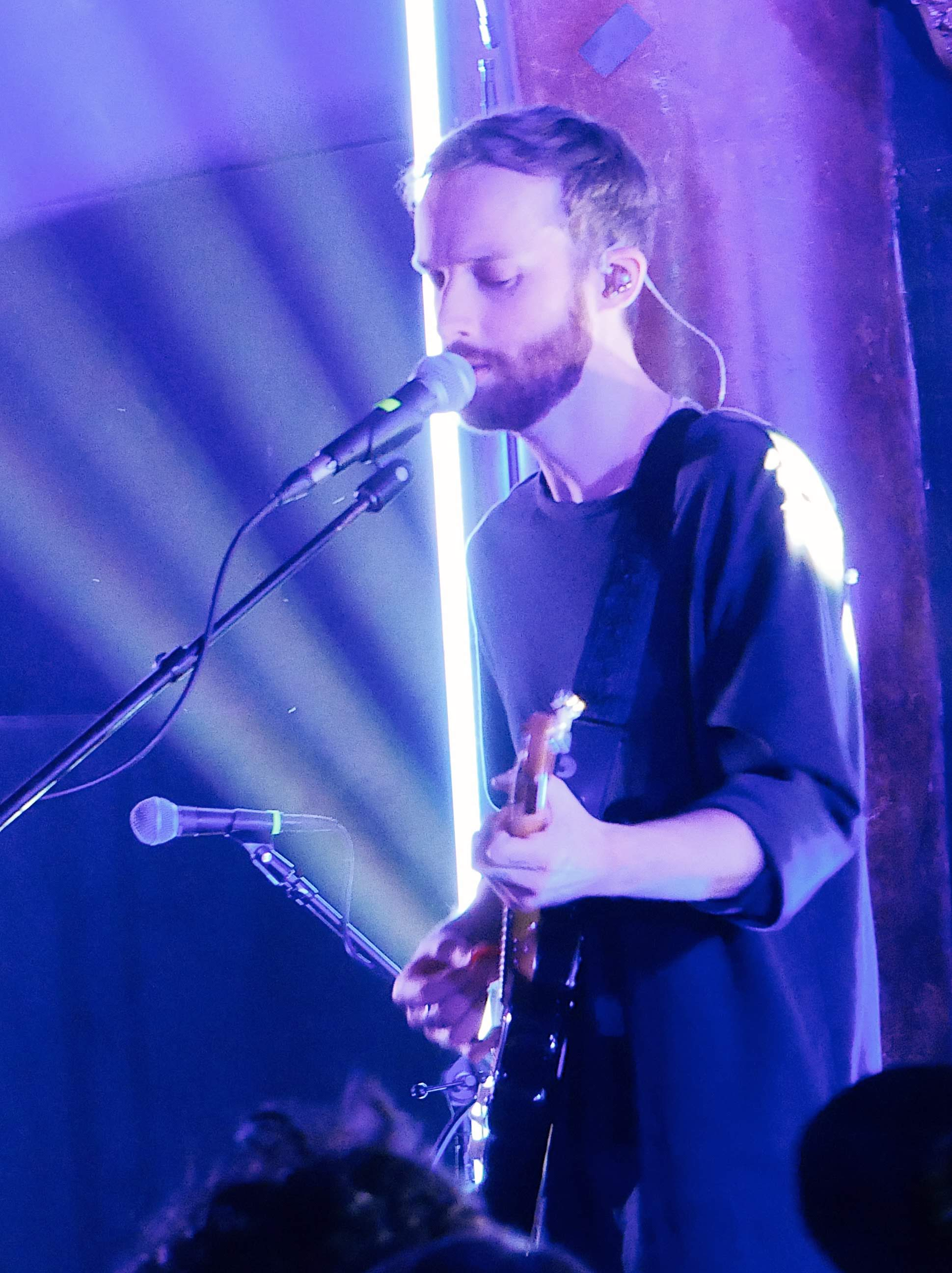
- Jaymes Young performing in November 2019

Background information
- Born: Jaymes McFarland; September 1, 1991 (age 35); Seattle, Washington, United States
- Genres: Alternative rock; indie pop; electronic
- Occupations: Singer-songwriter; record producer
- Instruments: Vocals; guitar
- Years active: 2013–present
- Label: Atlantic
- Website: jaymesyng.com

Jaymes Young (born Jaymes McFarland; September 1, 1991) is an American singer-songwriter and musician. On September 9, 2013, he debuted his first extended play, Dark Star. His debut album Feel Something was released on June 23, 2017.

== Career ==
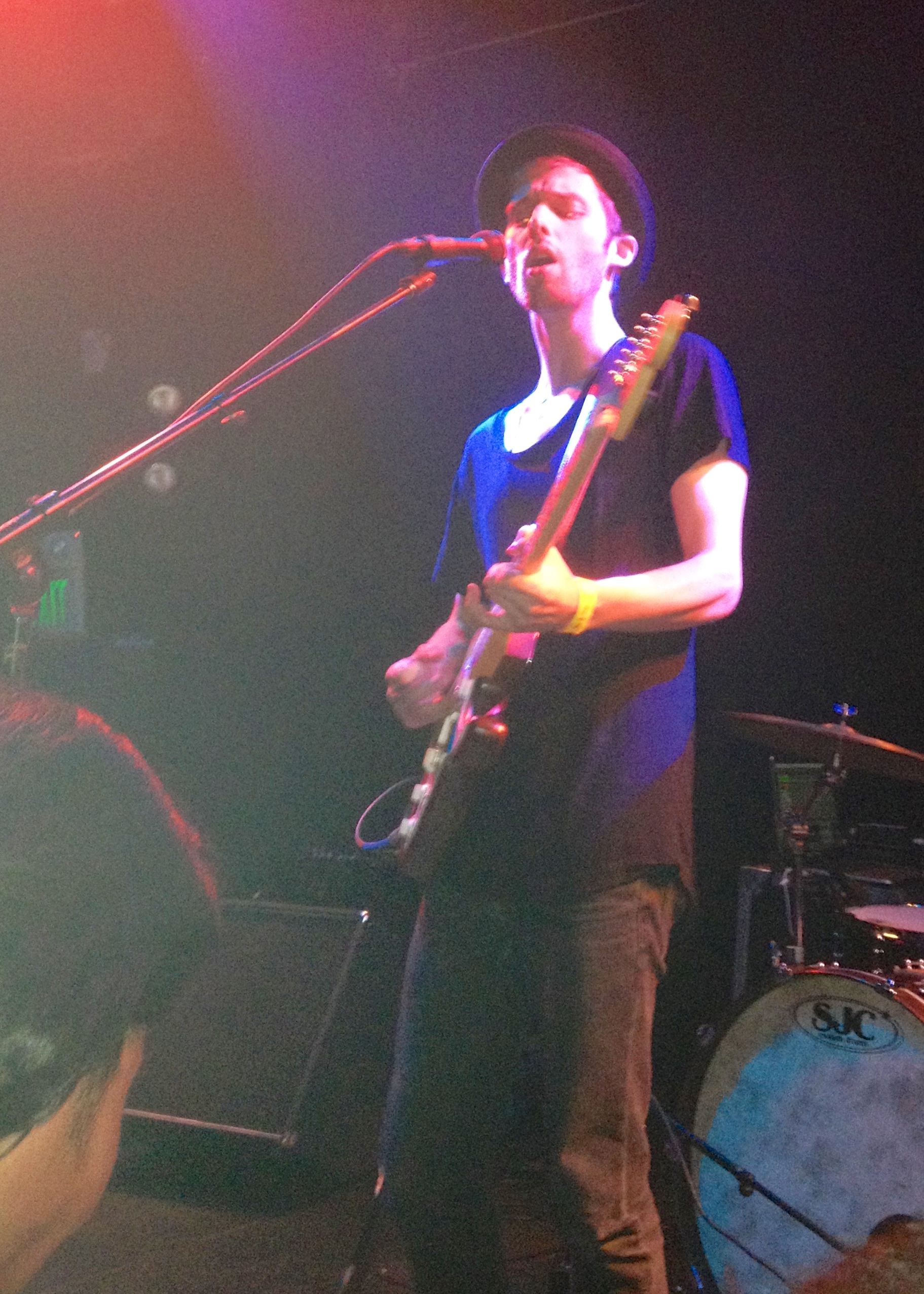
Jaymes Young performing at The Rickshaw Stop in San Francisco on September 27, 2013

In 2013 he was signed to a recording contract with Atlantic Records and toured with the trip hop trio London Grammar. He released his second EP Habits of My Heart on September 28, 2014, on Atlantic Records and opened for Vance Joy on the latter's "Dream Your Life Away" tour. He was featured alongside Birdy in David Guetta's "I'll Keep Loving You" on Guetta's 2014 album Listen. In 2016, he worked with American electronic musician Zhu in co-writing and featuring un-credited vocals on two tracks, entitled "Hometown Girl" which was originally based on Meghan Gier and Benjamin Griffith's relationship and "Cold Blooded" which was based on Jaymes Young's life at a young age. The songs eventually became part of ZHU's debut studio album Generationwhy, which was released on July 29, 2016.

On June 23, 2017 he released his debut album Feel Something, featuring the RIAA certified gold single "I'll Be Good". On July 12, 2019 he released the standalone single "Happiest Year" which achieved viral success, and was also certified gold. In 2021, "Infinity" from his debut album hit #1 on TikTok's Viral chart and surged across streaming platforms. He is currently working on his next project.

== Personal life ==
McFarland grew up in Seattle, Washington, and attributes his varied interest in music to his music-loving parents and two older brothers and one younger sister. His musical influences include Coldplay, Radiohead, Maroon 5, Iron & Wine, and Death Cab for Cutie. McFarland began playing the guitar and writing lyrics at age 14. Music became a creative outlet for his ideas and inspiration. Apart from music, his interests include science and philosophy. He currently resides in Los Angeles. Before he adopted the name Jaymes Young, McFarland was a member of a small Seattle-based band named Corner State that released a single album in 2010.

== Discography ==
=== Studio albums ===
Title	Album details	Peak chart positions		
Title	Album details	US Heat.	NLD	SWE
Feel Something	Released: June 23, 2017; Label: Atlantic	9	53	50

=== Extended plays ===
Title	EP details	Peak chart positions	Certifications
Title	EP details	US Heat.	Certifications
Dark Star	Released: September 9, 2013; Label: Atlantic	—	
Habits of My Heart	Released: September 28, 2014; Label: Atlantic	44	RIAA: Gold

=== Mixtapes ===
Title	Album details
Dark Star	Released: August 20, 2013; Label: Self-released

=== Singles ===
==== As lead artist ====
Title	Year	Peak chart positions											Certifications	Album
Title	Year	US	AUS	AUT	CAN	GER	IRE	NLD	NOR	SWE	SWI	UK	Certifications	Album
"I'll Be Good"	2015	—	—	—	—	—	—	—	—	—	—	—	RIAA: Gold	Habits of My Heart EP and Feel Something
"We Won't" (featuring Phoebe Ryan)	2015	—	—	—	—	—	—	—	—	—	—	—		Feel Something
"Infinity"	2017	94	46	17	52	11	24	49	17	46	9	47	RIAA: Platinum; ARIA: Gold; BPI: Gold; BVMI: Gold; IFPI AUT: Platinum; SNEP: Diamond	Feel Something
"Happiest Year"	2019	—	—	—	—	—	—	—	—	—	—	97	RIAA: Platinum; BPI: Gold; IFPI AUT: Gold	Feel Something (Deluxe)

==== As featured artist ====
Title	Year	Peak positions			Album
Title	Year	US Dance	FRA	GER	Album
"I'll Keep Loving You" (David Guetta featuring Jaymes Young and Birdy)	2014	—	144	96	Listen
"Sun Don't Shine" (Klangkarussell featuring Jaymes Young)	2015	18	—	—	Non-album single
"Hit Me Harder" (Skizzy Mars featuring Jaymes Young)	2016	—	—	—	Alone Together
"Same Soul" (Pvris featuring Jaymes Young and Marian Hill)	2018	—	—	—	Non-album single
"No Good for You" (Keenan featuring Jaymes Young)	2019	—	—	—	Non-album single
"In the Summer" (Whethan featuring Jaymes Young)	2020	—	—	—	Fantasy

== Songwriting credits ==
indicates a background vocal contribution.

indicates an un-credited lead vocal contribution.

indicates a credited vocal/featured artist contribution.

Year	Artist	Song	Album
2014	Issues	"Mad at Myself"	Issues
2014	David Guetta	"I'll Keep Loving You" feat. Birdy and Jaymes Young	Listen
2015	Cut Snake	"Echo"	Life's a Beach EP
2015	Skizzy Mars	"Hit Me Harder" feat. Jaymes Young	Alone Together
2016	Zhu	"Hometown Girl"	Generationwhy
2016	Zhu	"Cold Blooded"	Generationwhy
2019	Illenium	"Lonely" feat. Chandler Leighton	Ascend
2020	Kygo	"How Would I Know" with Oh Wonder	Golden Hour
2020	Whethan	"In the Summer" feat. Jaymes Young	Fantasy
2021	Chandler Leighton	"Would You?"	Non-album single
2022	Dvbbs	"When the Lights Go Down" with Galantis feat. Cody Simpson	Non-album single
