= Majid Jordan (album) =

Studio album by Majid Jordan
- Released: February 5, 2016
- Length: 51:40
- Labels: October's Very Own; Warner Bros.
- Producers: 40; Majid Jordan; Illangelo; Nineteen85; 40

Majid Jordan chronology
A Place Like This (2014)	Majid Jordan (2016)	The Space Between (2017)

Singles from Majid Jordan
- 1. "My Love" Released: July 10, 2015; 2. "Something About You" Released: December 4, 2015; 3. "King City" Released: February 5, 2016; 4. "Learn from Each Other" Released: February 17, 2016; 5. "Every Step Every Way" Released: March 22, 2016; 6. "Make It Work" Released: June 29, 2016; 7. "Small Talk" Released: August 25, 2016

Professional ratings
Aggregate scores
Source	Rating
Metacritic	69/100
Review scores
Source	Rating
AllMusic	3.5/5 stars
Exclaim!	9/10
HipHopDX	3.8/5
Pitchfork	6.8/10
Rolling Stone	3/5 stars

Majid Jordan is the debut studio album by Canadian R&B duo Majid Jordan, it was released on February 5, 2016, by OVO Sound and Warner Bros. Records. The album serves as a follow-up to their debut EP A Place Like This (2014). The album's sole guest appearance comes from OVO founder Drake, who they have previously worked with on his single "Hold On, We're Going Home" in 2013.

== Singles ==
On July 10, 2015, the first single "My Love", which features Drake was premiered on Beats 1 radio station, it was released after on the iTunes Store and Apple Music. On September 1, 2015, the music video was released for "My Love".

On November 30, 2015, the second single "Something About You" was premiered on Power 106 radio station, it was released digitally four days later along with the pre-order of the album on the iTunes Store and Apple Music. The music video was released later that month on December 22, 2015.

== Track listing ==
Majid Jordan track listing
No.	Title	Writer(s)	Producer(s)	Length
1.	"Learn from Each Other"	Majid Al Maskati; Jordan Ullman; Carlo Montagnese	Majid Jordan; Illangelo	5:46
2.	"Make It Work"	Al Maskati; Ullman; Jenna Andrews; Andrea Landis; Dillon Pace	Majid Jordan; Jenna Andrews^{[b]}	3:44
3.	"My Love" (featuring Drake)	Al Maskati; Ullman; Aubrey Graham; Paul Jefferies; Montagnese; Noah Shebib; Ilsey Juber	Illangelo; Nineteen85; Majid Jordan^{[a]}; 40^{[a]}	4:08
4.	"Small Talk"	Al Maskati; Ullman	Majid Jordan	4:19
5.	"Pacifico"	Al Maskati; Ullman	Majid Jordan	4:35
6.	"Shake Shake Shake"	Al Maskati; Ullman; Khalid Al Khajah	Majid Jordan	4:47
7.	"Love Is Always There"	Al Maskati; Ullman	Majid Jordan	4:47
8.	"Warm"	Al Maskati; Ullman	Majid Jordan	3:12
9.	"Something About You"	Al Maskati; Ullman; Montagnese; Joseph Gonsalves; Billy Walsh	Majid Jordan; Illangelo	4:21
10.	"Day and Night"	Al Maskati; Ullman	Majid Jordan	5:06
11.	"King City"	Al Maskati; Ullman; Jefferies	Majid Jordan; Nineteen85	3:21
12.	"Every Step Every Way"	Al Maskati; Ullman	Majid Jordan	3:34
Total length:				51:40

Notes

- ^{^a} signifies a co-producer.
- ^{^b} signifies a vocal producer.
- "Something About You" features background vocals by Snoh Aalegra.

== Personnel ==
Majid Jordan

- Majid Al-Maskati – vocals
- Jordan Ullman – instrumentation

Additional personnel

- Illangelo – instrumentation (1, 3, 9)
- Nineteen85 – instrumentation (3, 11)
- Noah "40" Shebib – instrumentation (3)
- Noel Cadastre – instrumentation (3)
- Sno Aallegra – backing vocals (9)
- Joseph Patrick Gonsalves – guitar (9)

Technical

- Chris Athens – mastering
- Noah "40" Shebib – mixing (all tracks); engineering (3)
- Noel "Gadget" Campbell – mixing (all tracks); engineering (3)
- Travis Sewchan – engineering, recording (1, 2, 4–8, 10–12); engineering assistance (3)
- Illangelo – engineering, recording (9)
- Christer George – additional engineering (3)
- Les Bateman – mixing assistance (3)
- Gregg Moffet – engineering assistance (3)

== Charts ==
Chart performance for Majid Jordan
Chart (2016)	Peak position
Australian Albums (ARIA)	87
Belgian Albums (Ultratop Flanders)	175
Canadian Albums (Billboard)	20
UK R&B Albums (Official Charts)	18
US Billboard 200	69
US Top R&B/Hip-Hop Albums (Billboard)	12

== Release history ==
Release history and formats for Majid Jordan
Region	Date	Format	Label
Various	February 5, 2016	CD; digital download	OVO Sound; Warner Bros.
