= Gallant (singer) =

American singer-songwriter (born 1991)

- Born: Christopher Joseph Gallant III; November 14, 1991 (age 35); Columbia, Maryland, U.S.
- Genres: R&B; alternative R&B; alternative rock; electronic; indie
- Occupations: Singer; songwriter
- Instrument: Vocals
- Years active: 2013 – present
- Labels: Warner Bros.; Mind of a Genius
- Website: gallant.space

Christopher Joseph Gallant III (born November 14, 1991), known professionally as Gallant, is an American singer and songwriter from Columbia, Maryland, signed to Mind of a Genius Records and Warner Bros. Records.

He first began to gain recognition after self-releasing his debut EP, Zebra in 2014. His debut studio album, Ology, was released worldwide in April 2016 to critical acclaim, earning him a Grammy Award nomination for Best Urban Contemporary Album.

== Early life and education ==
Gallant was born in Washington, D.C. When he was in elementary school, he and his family moved to Columbia, Maryland, where he attended Atholton High School. He started recording songs during middle school. He was influenced by R&B artists and then later alternative rock while growing up.

In 2013, he graduated from New York University Gallatin School of Individualized Study where he studied music.

== Career ==
=== 2013–2015: Early career and Zebra EP ===
In the fall of 2013, Gallant moved to Los Angeles, California, to work on a career in music.

In 2014, he self-released his debut EP, Zebra, which he describes as "a sonic diary about dealing with the aftermath of New York".

In 2015, his single "Weight in Gold" was played by Zane Lowe on Beats1's first air date in June 2015. The same year, Gallant toured with Sufjan Stevens on his North American tour, where he performed eighteen shows throughout the country.

Following the debut of "Weight in Gold" and a North American tour with Sufjan Stevens, Gallant was named one of fifteen artists that Spotify believed were destined to "breakout" in 2016. He is also featured in Zhu's (another Mind of a Genius Records artist) "Testarossa Music" from the Genesis Series EP. Gallant was also announced as the opener for Zhu's "Neon City" tour, spanning April and May in venues throughout America, beginning with Coachella.

On February 5, 2016, Gallant and Jhené Aiko released their first collaborative song, "Skipping Stones". The song was produced by Adrian Younge and co-produced by Stint (a frequent producer for Gallant), and features Gallant's signature falsetto style with specks of bold vocals and Jhené's signature soothing, a cappella-esque vocals. The song is licensed under Red Bull Media House and featured in its Red Bull Sound Select collection along with the B-side "Borderline".

Gallant performed both weekends of Coachella in 2016, which Billboard named the number-one moment of the entire festival. Weekend one included a surprise appearance from Seal, where the pair performed Seal's song "Crazy" and Gallant's song "Weight in Gold". The following weekend, included a surprise appearance from Jhené Aiko where the pair performed their collaboration "Skipping Stones".

=== In the Room ===
On January 6, 2016, Gallant debuted the first episode of his new series In the Room with Sufjan Stevens. The pair performed Stevens' song "Blue Bucket of Gold". Gallant partnered with Spotify for the second episode, which featured Seal and premiered on March 9, 2016. Gallant and Seal performed Gallant's hit song "Weight in Gold". At the end of the episode, Seal claimed that he was Gallant's biggest fan. For the third episode, Gallant covered Janet Jackson's "I Get Lonely" with Jack Garratt. Gallant's next collaboration was with John Legend, on Legend's song "Overload" Gallant's next collaborations were with Andra Day and Dua Lipa for the fifth and sixth episodes respectively.

Gallant described the In the Room series as "an ongoing collaborative project – a chance to both pay tribute to and create something special with the artists that have inspired me the most".

=== Ology ===
Gallant's debut studio album, Ology, was released on April 6, 2016, by Mind of a Genius Records. The album received critical acclaim, including a rating of 7.5/10 from Pitchfork, a rating 4/5 from The Guardian, which states, “If this is what R&B’s future looks like it’s brighter than ever”. Also, Entertainment Weekly named Ology one of the 25 best albums of 2016 (so far). The album was given praise given for his distinct and diverse sound, voice, and lyricism.

On May 12, 2016, Gallant made his national television debut on The Tonight Show Starring Jimmy Fallon. Gallant performed "Weight in Gold", which ended with a standing ovation from the audience. Fallon ended the show praising Gallant's performance with the quote, “Oh my goodness! I told you… Watch out for this guy [GALLANT]!”.

In September 2016, Gallant performed "Bourbon" and "Weight in Gold" for the BBC on Later... with Jools Holland. On December 2, 2016, Gallant was a Special Artist at the 2016 Mnet Asian Music Awards, singing "Weight in Gold".

In January 2017, he was chosen as Elvis Duran's Artist of the Month and on January 11, appeared on and performed "Weight in Gold" live on NBC's Today show with Kathie Lee Gifford and Hoda Kotb. On January 26, he released "Cave Me In" in collaboration with Epik High's Tablo and Eric Nam. In the spring of 2017, he performed as the opening act on John Legend's Darkness and Light tour.

=== Sweet Insomnia ===
On January 25, 2019, Gallant released his sophomore album Sweet Insomnia. The album features Sabrina Claudio on "Compromise" and 6lack on "Sweet Insomnia", the album's title track.

=== Neptune ===
On March 26, 2021, Gallant released his second EP Neptune with features from Brandy, Arin Ray, and R&B duo VanJess.

=== sneek ===
On November 17, 2023, Gallant and Terrace Martin formed together sneek, for a mix of soul and jazz features.

=== Zinc. ===
Releasing first his singles "Coldstar". on June 13, and "Fly on the Wall" on July 17, 2024, and after announcing its album, he introduced a more alternative/indie side; although describing as an "Ology remark".

== Discography ==
=== Studio albums ===
List of studio albums, with selected details and chart positions
| Title | Album details | Peak chart positions | | | | |
| Title | Album details | US R&B/ HH | US R&B | US Heat. | US Ind. | UK R&B |
|---|---|---|---|---|---|---|
| Ology | Released: April 6, 2016; Label: Mind of a Genius, Warner Bros.; Formats: CD, DL, LP, streaming | 39 | 18 | 17 | 50 | 34 |
| Sweet Insomnia | Released: October 25, 2019; Label: Mind of a Genius, Warner Bros.; Formats: CD, DL, streaming | — | — | — | — | — |
| Zinc. | Released: September 27, 2024; Label: Mom + Pop Music; Formats: CD, DL, LP, streaming | — | — | — | — | — |

=== Extended plays ===
List of extended plays, with selected details
| Title | Album details |
|---|---|
| Zebra | Released: May 2, 2014; Label: Self-released; Formats: Digital download, streaming |
| Neptune | Released: March 26, 2021; Label: EMPIRE; Formats: Digital download, streaming |
| sneek (with Terrace Martin) | Released: November 17, 2023; Label: O'Connor, Lowly & Create Music Group.; Formats: CD, DL, streaming |

=== As lead artist ===
List of singles as lead artist showing year released and album name
| Title | Year | Peak chart positions | | Certifications | Album |
| Title | Year | US Adult R&B | US R&B/HH Airplay | Certifications | Album |
|---|---|---|---|---|---|
| "Please? (Vignette)" | 2013 | — | — | | Non-album single |
| "If It Hurts" | 2013 | — | — | | Zebra EP |
| "Blue Bucket of Gold" (featuring Sufjan Stevens) | 2016 | — | — | | Ology |
| "Skipping Stones" (featuring Jhené Aiko) | 2016 | — | — | | Ology |
| "Boderline" | 2016 | — | — | | Ology |
| "Talking in Your Sleep" | 2016 | — | — | | Ology |
| "Weight in Gold" (solo or featuring Seal) | 2016 | 21 | — | MC: Gold | Ology |
| "Talking to Myself" | 2016 | — | — | | Ology |
| "Cave Me In" (with Tablo and Eric Nam) | 2017 | — | — | | Non-album single |
| "Bourbon" (featuring Saba and Lophiile) | 2017 | — | — | | Non-album single |
| "In the Room: Cruisin'" (with Andra Day) | 2017 | — | — | | Non-album single |
| "Gentleman" | 2018 | — | — | | Non-album single |
| "Doesn't Matter" | 2018 | 6 | 29 | | Non-album single |
| "Haha No One Can Hear You!" | 2018 | — | — | | Non-album single |
| "Mad at You" (with Noah Cyrus) | 2018 | — | — | | Good Cry EP |
| "Toogoodtobetrue" (featuring Sufjan Stevens and Rebecca Sugar) | 2018 | — | — | | Non-album single |
| "Sharpest Edges" | 2019 | — | — | | Sweet Insomnia |
| "Sleep On It" | 2019 | 16 | — | | Sweet Insomnia |
| "Compromise" (featuring Sabrina Claudio) | 2019 | — | — | | Sweet Insomnia |
| "311!" (featuring Terrace Martin, Robert Glasper & Keyon Harrold) | 2023 | — | — | | sneek EP |
| "Coldstar." | 2024 | — | — | | Zinc. |
| "Fly On the Wall. (Osaka Version)" | 2024 | — | — | | Zinc. |
| "Crimes Of Compassion." | 2024 | — | — | | Zinc. |
"—" denotes items which were not released in that country or failed to chart.

=== As featured artist ===
| Title | Year | Album |
|---|---|---|
| "Holding Back" (SG Lewis featuring Gallant) | 2016 | Yours EP |
| "Constantly Dissatisfied" (Niia featuring Gallant) | 2018 | I |
| "Run for Me" (SebastiAn featuring Gallant) | 2019 | Thirst |
| "Runaway Train" (Jamie N Commons with Skylar Grey featuring Gallant) | 2019 | non-album single |
| "Exit Sign" (The Knocks featuring Gallant) | 2019 | non-album single |
| "Pulling Away" (Sinead Harnett featuring Gallant) | 2019 | Lessons in Love |
| "Lose My Love" (Sad Money featuring Gallant and Felix Cartal) | 2020 | Non-album single |
| "Know Me" (BRONSON featuring Gallant) | 2020 | BRONSON |

=== Guest appearances ===
List of non-single guest appearances, with other performing artists, showing year released and album name
| Title | Year | Other artist(s) | Album |
|---|---|---|---|
| "Testarossa Music" | 2015 | ZHU | Genesis Series EP |
| "Hotline Bling (Encore)" | 2017 | Sufjan Stevens | Carrie & Lowell Live |
| "Tears Dry on Their Own" | 2017 | Dua Lipa | Live Acoustic EP |
| "Rockville Station" | 2018 | THEY. | Fireside EP |

=== Songwriting credits ===
List of songs written or co-written for other artists, showing year released and album name
| Title | Year | Artist(s) | Album |
|---|---|---|---|
| "Finale" | 2019 | Zach Callison, Deedee Magno Hall, Estelle, Michaela Dietz, Grace Rolek, Uzo Aduba, Jennifer Paz, Shelby Rabara, Kate Micucci, Matthew Moy, Tom Scharpling, Toks Olagundoye | Steven Universe the Movie (Original Soundtrack) |
| "Mind Games (feat. Jackson Wang)" | 2022 | 88rising, MILLI, Jackson Wang | non-album single |

Note: Gallant previously had a concept for Finale, but got scrapped. It was retrieved and released with the deluxe album on December 6, 2019

== Awards and nominations ==
| Year | Nominee / work | Award | Result |
|---|---|---|---|
| 2017 | Ology | Grammy Award for Best Urban Contemporary Album | Nominated |
| 2019 | Runaway Train (Jamie N Commons with Skylar Grey featuring Gallant | MTV Video Music Award for Best Video with a Social Message | Nominated |
