= Mind of a Genius Records =

British record label

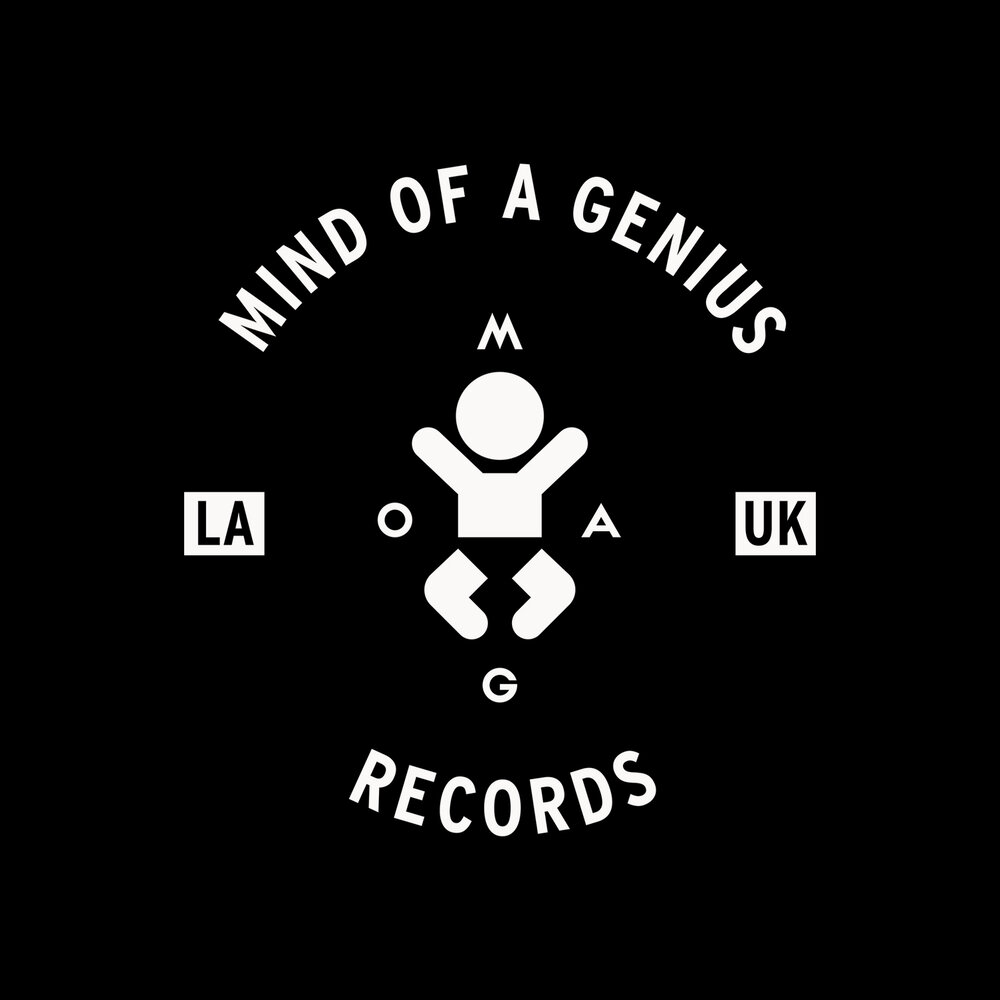
- Founded: 2013
- Founder: David Dann
- Genre: Electronica; R&B; hip hop; neo-psychedelia
- Location: Los Angeles; London
- Official website: https://www.mindofagenius.com/

Mind of a Genius Records is an independent record label founded by David Dann. Founded in 2013, the US/UK-based label has released music that focuses on electronic, hip-hop, and R&B. The label's roster includes Zhu, Gallant, THEY., and more.

== History ==
Mind of a Genius Records is an independent record label founded by David Dann. The label has signed artists across various genres and operates an in-house studio in Culver City

The label's first signee was dance/electronic musician ZHU. After signing ZHU, the label signed Gallant. On June 30, 2015, Gallant's single "Weight in Gold" became one of the first tracks to premiere on Zane Lowe's "World Record" Beats 1 show. After signing Gallant, the label signed THEY, an R&B duo consisting of Dante Jones & Drew Love. The label then signed the Dutch band Klangstof.

The label's roster currently totals eight artists. Artists record in-house at Mind of a Genius Studios, adjacent to the label's headquarters in Culver City, CA.

== Artists ==
- Gallant - an American singer-songwriter from Columbia, Maryland, who released his Grammy-nominated album Ology under the label in 2016. In 2019, Gallant released his second debut album, Sweet Insomnia.
- Klangstof - a Dutch alternative act who released their EP Everest under the label in 2017. That year, they became the first Dutch band to play at Coachella. Klangstof were also named "Best Alternative Act" at the Edison Awards.
- THEY. - an R&B duo based in Los Angeles, California, who collaborated with fellow Mind of a Genius signee ZHU and Skrillex on the single "Working for It." The song has been streamed more than 150 million times. Since then, the duo have released an LP titled Nü Religion: Hyena, an extension of their previous EP, Nü Religion.
- ZHU - an Asian-American singer/producer from San Francisco, California, known for the single 'Faded', which reached No. 12 on the Billboard US Dance/Electronic chart. In 2016, ZHU released his debut album GENERATIONWHY, which reached No. 1 on Billboard's Dance/Electronic Chart. In 2018, ZHU collaborated with Tame Impala to record the viral hit, "My Life." which has been streamed more than 20 million times and reached No. 1 on Spotify's Global Viral 50. In 2019, ZHU returned with his album Ringos Desert. The album reached #1 on iTunes Electronic Albums Chart and has been streamed over 150 million times since its release.
- Mindchatter - a producer of electronic music from New York City who has earned praise from Pete Tong, a premier British disc jockey for BBC Radio 1.
- Karnaval Blues- a British producer who released his debut EP, You Come With the Rain, in late 2019.
- KWAYE - a Zimbabwean singer/songwriter based in Los Angeles, California, whose songs have appeared in the Netflix series Topboy and On My Block. KWAYE's single "Cool Kids" was released in 2017 alongside his debut EP, Solar.
- Peter $un- a rapper from Richmond, Virginia, whose music blends rap, jazz, and electronica. On August 20, 2020, Peter $un released a new single titled "100 Proof" featuring Guapdad 4000.
- Jordan Astra - an Indonesian-Canadian singer/songwriter based in Toronto.

== Discography ==
- ZHU- Nightday EP (2014)
- ZHU- Genesis Series (2015)
- THEY.- Nü Religion EP (2015)
- Gallant- Ology (2016)
- Klangstof- Close Eyes to Exit (2016)
- ZHU- GENERATIONWHY (2016)
- Klangstof- Everest EP (2017)
- KWAYE- Solar EP (2017)
- KWAYE- Love & Affliction (2018)
- ZHU- Ringos Desert (2018)
- THEY.- Fireside EP (2018)
- Klangstof- The Noise You Make Is Silent (2019)
- Karnaval Blues- You Come With the Rain (2019)
- Gallant- Sweet Insomnia (2019)
