= Lane 8 =

American musician (born 1990)

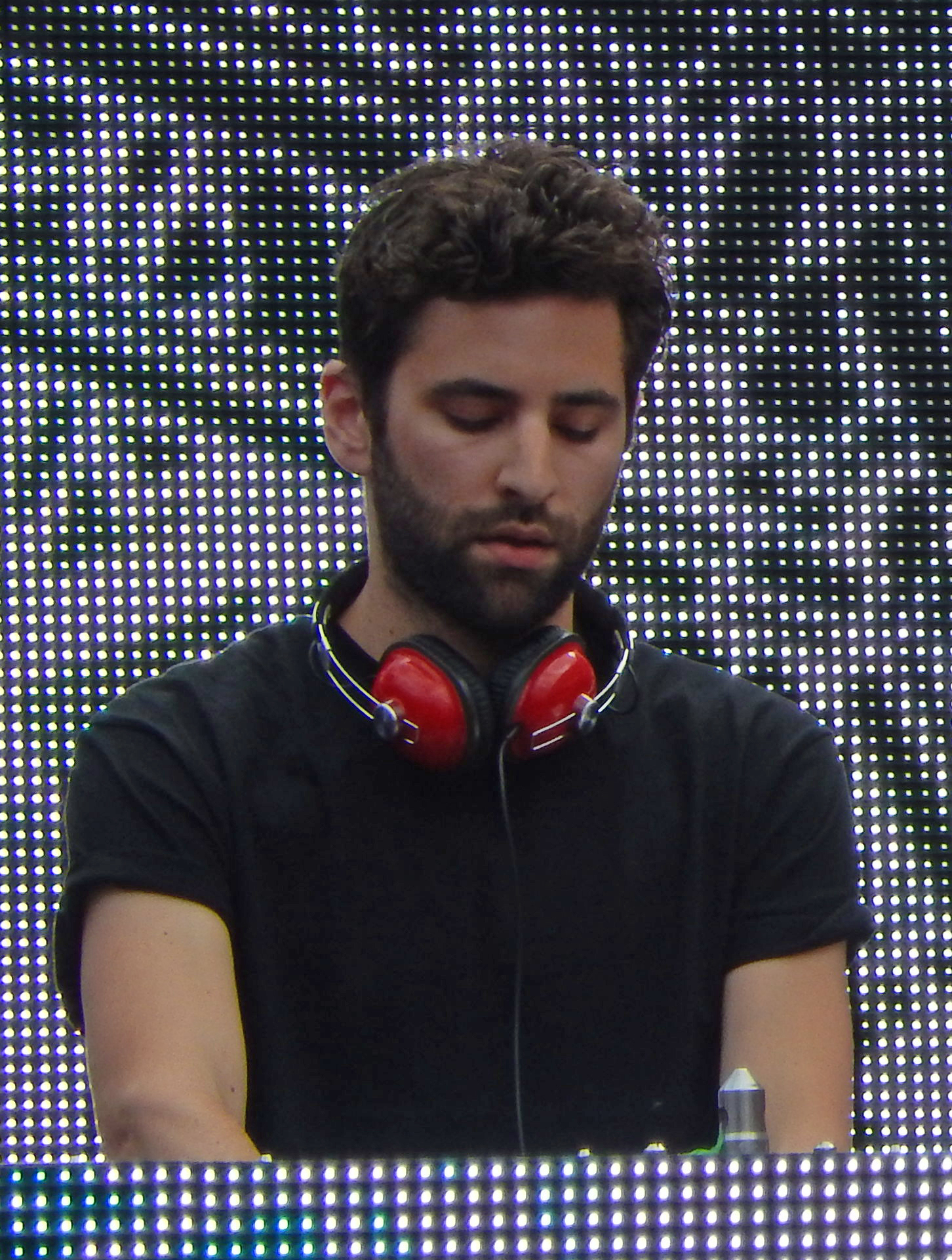
- Lane 8 in 2015

Background information
- Born: Daniel Goldstein; October 27, 1990 (age 36)
- Origin: San Francisco, California, United States
- Genres: Deep house; progressive house; trance
- Occupations: DJ; record producer
- Years active: 2012–present
- Labels: Anjunadeep; Suara; This Never Happened
- Website: lane8music.com

Daniel Goldstein, better known by his stage name Lane 8, is an American musician, DJ, and electronic music producer. Currently residing in Denver, Colorado, he is signed to English deep house label Anjunadeep. Pete Tong named Lane 8 a "Future Star" and Dancing Astronaut included him in their '25 Artists to Watch in 2015'. His debut studio album Rise, was released on July 17, 2015. More recently, he has been releasing music through his own label This Never Happened.

== Biography ==
The Lane 8 moniker originated back when Goldstein made garage rock with his sibling when they were kids. He later started experimenting with hip-hop beats after being influenced by Pete Rock and DJ Premier. At some point in 2012, "Lane 8 really found his groove with his sound fitting between pulsing electronica and a woozier kind of glitch-pop" putting him on the radar of Anjunadeep A&R executive Jody Wisternoff. In 2013, he signed to Anjunadeep, where he released his debut album in the summer of 2015. He has previously described his sound as "dreamy back rub house."

In 2016, Lane 8 founded the record label This Never Happened (TNH). Named after the show concept that began with his Little by Little tour, This Never Happened was created to build an independent presence in the deep house genre. It has since grown into an outlet where he is able to release his best tracks as well as introduce new talent into the scene and give them a wider platform to build upon. Artists signed to This Never Happened have been known to tour with Lane 8 as supporting acts and produce remixes of other TNH artists that are then released on the label. This Never Happened also volumetrically released Root to Branch, an EP-length compilation series featuring a few artists that provides listeners with a shorter inundation of new music. As of 2024, ten volumes of Root to Branch have been released.

== Career ==
Lane 8 launched the This Never Happened show concept, attached to his Little by Little tour, in 2016. Attendees are prohibited from recording the shows with cell phones or cameras on the basis of encouraging attendees to be present. In 2017, Lane 8 began hosting This Never Happened Summer Gatherings, daytime events in unique outdoor venues.

After releasing music on SoundCloud in 2014, Lane 8 rose to wider prominence through the Anjunadeep label, and his 2015 debut album Rise.

=== Rise ===
On April 27, 2015, Lane 8 announced his plans to release his debut studio album, Rise on Anjunadeep. The album features vocal appearances from Solomon Grey, Patrick Baker, and Ghostly International's Matthew Dear, among others.

The lead single, "Ghost" featuring Patrick Baker, was released alongside the album announcement and Vice Media's Noisey premiered the song's music video, directed by filmmaker DEMS on May 12. Following suit with the unveiling of the single, a "Ghost" remix EP was announced via an exclusive stream from Thump. The EP features "a diverse collection of artists like Audion (an alias of Matthew Dear), Bwana, Luvian, and even Lane 8 himself" with styles "ranging from techno to flowing progressive house, in four very captivating interpretations of the original track." On May 14, Billboard premiered the Audion remix which "trades the original's beatless melodies and lonely lead synth line for a tribal groove that provides an edgy backdrop to Patrick Baker's longing lyrics." The second single from the album, "Hot As You Want", was premiered by Spin on June 1. They described it as a "lovely 4/4 anthem" and "sublimely aching track."

=== Little by Little ===
On January 19, 2018, Lane 8 released his second studio album, Little by Little, to digital stores through This Never Happened.

=== Brightest Lights ===
On January 10, 2020, Lane 8 released his third studio album, Brightest Lights. The album features several appearances from the American synth-pop band POLIÇA, among other collaborators.

=== Reviver ===
On January 21, 2022, Lane 8 released his fourth studio album, Reviver. It features appearances by, Arctic Lake, Art School Girlfriend, Tailor, Kasablanca and Sultan + Shepard.

=== Childish ===
On September 27, 2024, Lane 8 released his fifth studio album, Childish. It features appearances by Arctic Lake, Art School Girlfriend, Tailor, Kasablanca, and Sultan + Shepard. The album cover features art from his daughter, a departure from his previous studio album covers which heavily feature imagery of reflection, symmetry and natural elements.

Lane 8 shared in the announcement of the forthcoming album that he focused on channeling unrestrained imagination of his kids and his younger self. "[A]s parents, we’ve always tried to provide the materials and space for [children] to create, but to then step back and let them be themselves and focus without interfering, seeing the joy and the confidence that creating in their own way brings them has been one of the most eye-opening parts of parenthood for me."

== Discography ==
=== Studio albums ===
- Rise (2015)
- Little by Little (2018)
- Brightest Lights (2020)
- Reviver (2022)
- Childish (2024)
- Cross Pollination II (2026)

=== Compilation albums ===
- Rise (Remixed) (Anjunadeep / March 11, 2016)
- Rise (Live & In Session) (Anjunadeep / April 1, 2016)

=== Extended plays ===
2018

- Bluebird / Duchess [This Never Happened]

2016

- Divina / Crush [This Never Happened]
- Midnight [Suara Music]

2014

- Diamonds / Without You [Anjunadeep]
- The One [Anjunadeep]

=== Singles ===
2022

- "Automatic" (featuring Solomon Grey)

2021

- "Nuclear Lethargy" [This Never Happened]
- "What Have You Done To Me?" (featuring Arctic Lake) [This Never Happened]
- "Reviver" [This Never Happened]
- "Riptide" (featuring Davey Havok) [This Never Happened]
- "Is This Our Earth?" [Anjunadeep]
- "Oh, Miles" (featuring Julia Church) [This Never Happened]

2020

- "Buggy" (with Yotto) [Odd One Out]
- "Shatter" (with Otr) [This Never Happened]
- "Run" (with Kasablanca) [This Never Happened]
- "Matcha Mistake" (with Kidnap) [This Never Happened]
- "Keep On" [Anjunadeep]
- "Out of Sight" (featuring Hexlogic) [This Never Happened]
- "Roll Call" (with Anderholm) [This Never Happened]
- "Bear Hug" [This Never Happened]
- "Road" (featuring Arctic Lake) [This Never Happened]

2019

- "Just" [This Never Happened]
- "Yard Two Stone" (featuring Jens Kuross) [This Never Happened]
- "The Gift" [This Never Happened]
- "Don't Let Me Go" (featuring Arctic Lake) [This Never Happened]
- "Sunday Song" [This Never Happened]
- "Brightest Lights" (with Poliça) [This Never Happened]
- "I / Y" (with Yotto) [This Never Happened]
- "Feld / Anthracite" [Anjunadeep]
- "Visions" (with Rbbts) [This Never Happened]

2018

- "The Disappearance of Colonel Mustard" [This Never Happened]
- "Let Me" (with Avoure) [This Never Happened]
- "Stir Me Up" [This Never Happened]
- "Coming Back to You" (featuring J.F. July) [This Never Happened]

2017

- "Atlas" [This Never Happened]
- "No Captain" (featuring Poliça) [This Never Happened]
- "March of the Forest Cat" [This Never Happened]
- "Little Voices" [This Never Happened]
- "Aba" (with Kidnap) [Anjunadeep]

2016

- "In My Arms" [This Never Happened]
- "With Me" [This Never Happened]
- "Fingerprint" [This Never Happened]

2015

- "Undercover" (featuring Matthew Dear) [Anjunadeep]
- "Loving You" (featuring Lulu James) [Anjunadeep]
- "Hot As You Want" (featuring Solomon Grey) [Anjunadeep]
- "Ghost" (featuring Patrick Baker) [Anjunadeep]

2014

- "I Got What You Need (Every Night)" (featuring Bipolar Sunshine) [Anjunadeep]

2013

- "Be Mine" [Anjunadeep]

=== Remixes ===
- Sultan & Shepard — "NCtrl" (Lane 8 Remix) (This Never Happened / July 20, 2021)
- Clozee — "Neon Jungle" (Lane 8 Remix) (Odyzey Music / October 9, 2020)
- Virtual Self — "Ghost Voices" (Lane 8 Remix) (Self-released / February 12, 2019)
- RUFUS — "Innerbloom" (Lane 8 Remix) (Sweat It Out / October 21, 2016)
- deadmau5 — "Strobe" (Lane 8 Remix) (mau5trap / September 23, 2016)
- Icarus featuring Aurora — "Home" (Lane 8 Remix) (FFRR / May 13, 2016)
- Solomon Grey — "Miradors" (Lane 8 Remix) (Anjunadeep / November 13, 2015)
- Maribou State — "Wallflower" (Lane 8 Remix) (Anjunadeep / September 4, 2015)
- Walking Shapes — "In The Wake" (Lane 8 Remix) (No Shame / July 17, 2015)
- Odesza — "Bloom" (Lane 8 Remix) (Foreign Family Collective / February 9, 2015)
- Eric Prydz — "Liberate" (Lane 8 Remix) (Virgin / July 27, 2014)
- Above & Beyond featuring Alex Vargas — "Sticky Fingers" (Lane 8 Remix) (Anjunabeats / May 19, 2014)
- Josh Record — "Pictures In The Dark" (Lane 8 Remix) (Virgin Records / April 4, 2014)
- Daughter — "Youth" (Lane 8 Remix) (Free Download)
- Le Youth — "C O O L" (Lane 8 Remix) (Ultra / July 2, 2013)
- Spandau Ballet — "True" (Lane 8 Edit) (Free Download)
- Chris Isaak — "Wicked Game" (Lane 8 Edit) (Free Download)
- Mike Mago — "The Show" (Lane 8 Remix) (TBD / TBD)
- Snowden — "The Beat Comes" (Lane 8 Remix) (Serpents and Snakes / October 22, 2012)

=== DJ mixes ===
- The Anjunadeep Edition 28
- The Anjunadeep Edition 64
- The Anjunadeep Edition 176
- The Anjunadeep Edition 214
- Winter 2013 Mixtape
- Spring 2014 Mixtape
- Summer 2014 Mixtape
- Fall 2014 Mixtape
- Winter 2014 Mixtape
- Spring 2015 Mixtape
- Fall 2015 Mixtape
- Winter 2015 Mixtape
- Spring 2016 Mixtape
- Summer 2016 Mixtape
- Fall 2016 Mixtape
- Winter 2016 Mixtape
- Spring 2017 Mixtape
- Summer 2017 Mixtape Part 1
- Summer 2017 Mixtape Part 2
- Fall 2017 Mixtape
- Winter 2017 Mixtape
- Spring 2018 Mixtape
- BBC Radio 1 Essential Mix
- Fall 2018 Mixtape
- Winter 2018 Mixtape
- Spring 2019 Mixtape
- Summer 2019 Mixtape
- Fall 2019 Mixtape
- Halloween 2019 Mixtape
- Winter 2019 Mixtape
- Spring 2020 Mixtape
- Summer 2020 Mixtape
- Fall 2020 Mixtape
- Winter 2020 Mixtape
- Spring 2021 Mixtape
- Summer 2021 Mixtape
- Fall 2021 Mixtape
- Winter 2021 Mixtape
- Spring 2022 Mixtape
- Summer 2022 Mixtape
- Fall 2022 Mixtape
- Winter 2022 Mixtape
- Spring 2023 Mixtape
- Summer 2023 Mixtape
- Fall 2023 Mixtape
- Winter 2023 Mixtape
- Spring 2024 Mixtape
- Summer 2024 Mixtape
- Fall 2024 Mixtape
- Winter 2024 Mixtape
- Spring 2025 Mixtape
- Summer 2025 Mixtape
- Fall 2025 Mixtape

== See also ==
- Anjunabeats
