= Peter Sandberg =

- Origin: Uppsala, Sweden
- Genres: Neoclassical; electronic
- Occupation: Musician
- Years active: 2015–present
- Label: Phases
- Website: petersandberg.com

Peter Sandberg is a Swedish neoclassical and electronic musician and composer. He has released several albums, including Motion (2019), Återvända (2020), Midnattssol (2021), and Constellations (2023).

== Early life ==
Sandberg was born and raised in Uppsala, Sweden. He started playing piano at age 12, and started learning classical piano at 15.

== Career ==
Sandberg started out working as a composer for music libraries, doing so for about six years. He signed with Phases Records in 2018, and the following year signed with Sony Music Publishing.

In 2019, Sandberg released his first album on Phases, Motion. It was recorded at Baggpipe Studios in Stockholm. The Motion single "Deep" was featured in Netflix's Stranger Things season 3 finale. Sandberg's work has also been featured in ads for Discovery, Volvo, and Tesla.

In 2020, he released the singles "Unhold Me" featuring Arctic Lake, and "Pinetrees" featuring Henry Green. On September 25, 2020, he released the album Återvända, which includes the singles "Rise" and "In Seven". Also that year, he scored the French animated short virtual reality film Goodbye Mr. Octopus.

On October 1, 2021, he released his third album on Phases Records, Midnattssol, featuring the single "Wasted On You" with Aquilo. The album also includes collaborations with Tom Ashbrook, Jake Isaac, and Siv Jakobsen. It is "a tribute to the land and folklore of the Swedish midnight sun through the power of transportive soundscapes." Later that year, he performed at the London Jazz Festival. In 2023, Sandberg and Jamie Duffy released the single "Eyrie". That year, he released Constellations, an album on which he explores stars and outer space.

== Discography ==
=== Albums ===
Title	Release details	Peak chart positions
Title	Release details	UK Classic
Jane, Forever	Released: May 26, 2016; Label: Epidemic Sound; Formats: Streaming	—
Motion	Released: September 25, 2018; Label: Phases Records; Formats: LP, CD, digital download, streaming	—
Återvända	Released: March 1, 2019; Label: Phases Records; Formats: LP, CD, digital download, streaming	—
Midnattssol	Released: October 1, 2021; Label: Phases Records; Formats: Digital download, streaming	—
Constellations	Released: August 18, 2023; Label: Phases Records; Formats: CD, digital download, streaming	—
Sensory Alignment: Composed for Calm	Released: October 10, 2025; Label: Believe UK; Formats: CD, digital download, streaming	—
Temporary Coexistence of Humans	Released: May 1, 2026; Label: Parlophone; Formats: CD, digital download, streaming	14
"—" denotes a recording that did not chart or was not released in that territory.

=== EPs ===
Title	Release details
Blue Brook	Released: June 17, 2015; Label: Self-released; Formats: Digital download, streaming
A Scandinavian Thing	Released: July 1, 2015; Label: Self-released; Formats: Digital download, streaming
The Significant One	Released: February 2, 2016; Label: Self-released; Formats: Digital download, streaming
Nainsook	Released: May 6, 2016; Label: Self-released; Formats: Digital download, streaming
Cranberry Garden	Released: May 19, 2016; Label: Self-released; Formats: Digital download, streaming
Bark Boats	Released: May 26, 2016; Label: Self-released; Formats: Digital download, streaming
The Philosophers	Released: June 2, 2016; Label: Self-released; Formats: Digital download, streaming
String Works	Released: February 10, 2017; Label: Self-released; Formats: Digital download, streaming
Polaris	Released: December 21, 2022; Label: Phases Records; Formats: Digital download, streaming

=== Singles ===
- "Balm" (2016)
- "Dismantle" (2016)
- "Implode" (2016)
- "Resonant" (2018)
- "Motion" (2018)
- "Deep" (2019)
- "Unhold Me" (with Arctic Lake) (2020)
- "Rise" (2020)
- "In Seven" (2020)
- "Pinetrees" (with Henry Green) (2020)
- "Wait"(2021)
- "Frihet" (2021)
- "Warm Cold Hands" (2021)
- "Wasted on You" (with Aquilo) (2021)
- "Orion" (2023)
- "Capricornus" (2023)
- "Polaris IV" (2023)
- "Eyrie" (with Jamie Duffy) (2023)
