= The Space Between (Majid Jordan album) =

2017 studio album by Majid Jordan

Studio album by Majid Jordan
- Released: October 27, 2017
- Recorded: 2016–17
- Length: 49:34
- Labels: OVO; Warner Bros.
- Producers: Jordan Ullman; Majid Jordan; Nineteen85; Stargate

Majid Jordan chronology
Majid Jordan (2016)	The Space Between (2017)	Wildest Dreams (2021)

Singles from The Space Between
- 1. "Phases" Released: April 28, 2017; 2. "One I Want" Released: June 15, 2017; 3. "My Imagination" Released: September 28, 2017; 4. "Body Talk" Released: October 19, 2017

The Space Between is the second studio album by Canadian R&B duo Majid Jordan, released on October 27, 2017, by OVO Sound and Warner Bros. Records. It features guest appearances from OVO label-mates PartyNextDoor and Dvsn. The album's production was handled primarily by Majid Jordan, alongside Nineteen85 and Stargate.

== Background ==
On July 31, 2017, Majid Jordan took to Instagram to announce the album. The tracklist was revealed on October 17, 2017.

== Singles ==
The lead single, "Phases", was released on April 28, 2017. The second single, "One I Want", featuring OVO label-mate PartyNextDoor, was released on June 15, 2017. The third and final single, "My Imagination", featuring another OVO label-mate Dvsn, was released on September 28, 2017.

== Promotion ==
=== Tour ===
On January 1, 2018, Majid Jordan announced an official headlining concert tour to further promote the album, titled The Space Between Tour. The tour began on January 16, 2018, in Montreal, at M Telus.

== Critical reception ==
Professional ratings
Review scores
Source	Rating
Exclaim!	7/10
Pitchfork	7.4/10

The Space Between received positive reviews from critics. Briana Younger from Pitchfork said, "The writing is simple but effective; the productions are intricate but subtly propulsive. There is plenty that can stand alone here, but the album is best consumed all the way through, present and unhurried." Yasin Rahman from Exclaim' stated, "The Space Between is enjoyable and interesting. Majid Jordan haven't strayed too far from their typical formula, but keep things interesting for their fans with introspective lyrics and new sounds."

== Track listing ==
The Space Between track listing
No.	Title	Writer(s)	Producer(s)	Length
1.	"Intro"	Majid Al-Maskati; Jordan Ullman	Ullman	1:07
2.	"Gave Your Love Away"	Al-Maskati; Ullman	Ullman	4:45
3.	"OG Heartthrob"	Al-Maskati; Ullman	Ullman	4:28
4.	"Body Talk"	Al-Maskati; Ullman; James Fauntleroy; Mikkel Eriksen; Tor Hermansen	Stargate; Ullman	3:27
5.	"Not Ashamed"	Al-Maskati; Ullman; Ilsey Juber	Ullman	4:00
6.	"One I Want" (featuring PartyNextDoor)	Al-Maskati; Ullman; Jahron Brathwaite	Majid Jordan	3:32
7.	"You"	Al-Maskati; Ullman	Ullman	5:42
8.	"Phases"	Al-Maskati; Ullman	Ullman	3:37
9.	"Asleep"	Al-Maskati; Ullman; Taylor Parks	Ullman	3:49
10.	"What You Do to Me"	Al-Maskati; Ullman; Juber	Ullman	3:36
11.	"My Imagination" (featuring Dvsn)	Al-Maskati; Ullman; Daniel Daley; Paul Jefferies	Ullman; Nineteen85	3:45
12.	"The Space Between"	Al-Maskati; Ullman; Parks	Ullman	3:25
13.	"Outro"	Al-Maskati; Ullman	Ullman	4:21
Total length:				49:34

== Personnel ==
Performers

- Majid Jordan – primary artist
- PartyNextDoor – featured artist (track 6)
- Dvsn – featured artist (track 11)

Technical

- Chris Athens – mastering engineer (all tracks)
- Noel "Gadget" Campbell – mixing engineer (all tracks)
- Harley Arsenault – assistant mixing engineer (all tracks)
- Noah "40" Shebib – assistant mixing engineer (all tracks)
- Jordan Ullman – recording engineer (tracks 1–3, 5–13)
- Erik Sist – assistant recording engineer (tracks 1–10, 12, 13)
- Greg Moffett – assistant recording engineer (tracks 1–10, 12, 13)
- Thomas Warren – recording engineer (track 4)
- Mikkel Eriksen – recording engineer (track 4)
- Josh Florez – recording engineer (track 7)

Production

- Jordan Ullman – producer (tracks 1–5, 7–13)
- Stargate – producer (track 4)
- Majid Jordan – producer (track 6)
- Nineteen85 – producer (track 11)

== Charts ==
Chart performance for The Space Between
Chart (2017)	Peak position
Canadian Albums (Billboard)	30
UK R&B Albums (Official Charts)	38
New Zealand Heatseeker Albums (RMNZ)	10
US Billboard 200	74
US Top R&B/Hip-Hop Albums (Billboard)	35
