= Rise (Lane 8 album) =

Studio album by Lane 8
- Released: July 17, 2015
- Genre: Deep house, house, electronica
- Length: 53:01
- Label: Anjunadeep

Lane 8 chronology
Rise (2015)	Little by Little (2018)

Singles from Rise
- 1. "Ghost" Released: 27 April 2015; 2. "Hot As You Want" Released: 1 June 2015; 3. "Loving You" Released: 11 July 2015; 4. "Undercover" Released: 23 October 2015; 5. "Diamonds" Released: 17 November 2014

Rise is the debut album by American musician Lane 8. It was released on July 17, 2015, by Anjunadeep.

== Reception ==
Rise was generally well received by critics. Your EDM rated the album a 4 out of 5, with writer Cody Smith saying that "the tracks on Rise tap expertly into pop appeal without ever compromising the key tenets of house music," but noting that "The only danger apparent in Goldstein's adherence to Anjunadeep characteristics is that Rise may be too similar to other albums on the label." Jacqui Wonder of Acid Stag remarked that it was hard to determine "Lane 8's secret sauce to maintaining a cohesive sound as he produces such distinct tracks.

== Track listing ==
No.	Title	Length
1.	"Loving You" (featuring Lulu James)	4:01
2.	"Diamonds" (featuring Solomon Grey)	5:54
3.	"Klara"	5:48
4.	"Ghost" (featuring Patrick Baker)	3:24
5.	"Cosi"	3:52
6.	"Hot As You Want" (featuring Solomon Grey)	4:46
7.	"Undercover" (featuring Matthew Dear)	4:47
8.	"Sunlight"	4:55
9.	"The Great Divide" (featuring Ara Scott)	3:25
10.	"Rise"	6:57
Total length:		53:01

Bonus track
No.	Title	Length
11.	"Diamonds" (featuring Solomon Grey) (Live version)	5:12
