= Arctic Lake (band) =

English indie pop duo

- Origin: London, England
- Genres: Indie pop; alt pop; dream pop
- Years active: 2014—2025
- Label: Astralwerks
- Members: Emma Foster; Paul Holliman
- Past members: Andy Richmond

Arctic Lake was an alt pop duo from London, England composed of vocalist Emma Foster and multi-instrumentalist producer Paul Holliman. The band was originally a trio with founding member Andrew Richmond.

== History ==
Emma Foster and Paul Holliman met in 2012 while studying in London and formed Arctic Lake in 2014, together with Andrew Richmond. They released their first original song online in 2014, titled "How Long Can You Stare". Their debut single, "Limits", came out in 2015. After releasing the single "Heal Me" in 2016, they were invited to perform at the Reading and Leeds Festivals in England that same year.

Arctic Lake released their debut EP, titled Closer, in 2017 and their follow-up, What You May Find, in 2018. See Inside, their third EP, came out in February 2020. During this period, they had their first UK headline tour (in May 2018), toured with Freya Ridings and Vancouver Sleep Clinic, and collaborated with house producer Lane 8 and neo-classical pianist Peter Sandberg. In 2021, they teamed up with ZHU on "Yours", a noirish techno track that hit #16 on Billboard's Dance chart. Their next single, "Lonely", followed on 10 September 2021.

In February 2025, the band announced that they were splitting up.

== Musical style ==
Arctic Lake's sound has been described as "delectably dreamy alt-pop", and Mundane Mag noted their "ability to channel tightly-wound emotions and turn them into breathtaking, electromagnetic anthems".

== Discography ==
EPs

- Closer (2017)
- What You May Find (2018)
- See Inside (2020)
- side by side we lie awake (2022)
- How Do You Make It Look So Easy? (2023)

Singles

- "Limits" (2015)
- "Only Me" (2015)
- "For Us" (2015)
- "Heal Me" (2016)
- "Friend" (2016)
- "What You May Find" (2018)
- "Sight of You" (2018)
- "Night Cries" (2018)
- "You Know All of Me" (2018)
- "Night Cries/Further (Mahogany Sessions)" (2018)
- "Blue Monday" (2019)
- "My Favourite Game" (2019)
- "Shed a Tear" (2019)
- "Unhold Me" – with Peter Sandberg (2020)
- "Read" (2020)
- "Cold Hands" (2020)
- "Yours" – with ZHU (2021)
- "Lonely" (2021)
- "Breathe" (2022)
- "Love You Like That" (2022)
- "Srs2" (2022)
- "Amazing" (2023)
- "Are You Okay?" (2023)
- "My Weakness" (2023)
- "Silver Pendant" (2023)
- "Fool" (2023)
- "Hold Me" (2023)

Featured on

- "Fall" – Over the Water (Poté), 2016)
- "Don't Let Me Go" – Brightest Lights (Lane 8, 2019)
- "Cherry-Coloured Funk" – Back to Life (2019)
- "Road" – Brightest Lights (Lane 8, 2020)
- "Plus Minus" – Organ (Dimension, 2021)
- "What Have You Done to Me?" – Reviver (Lane 8, 2021)
