= Generationwhy =

Studio album by Zhu
- Released: July 29, 2016
- Recorded: 2015–16
- Genre: Electronic
- Length: 59:00
- Label: Mind of a Genius; Columbia
- Producer: Zhu; Skrillex

Zhu chronology
Genesis Series EP (2015)	Generationwhy (2016)	Ringos Desert (2018)

Singles from Generationwhy
- 1. "Working for It" Released: November 9, 2015; 2. "In the Morning" Released: February 25, 2016; 3. "Generationwhy" Released: June 13, 2016; 4. "Palm of My Hand" Released: July 15, 2016; 5. "Hometown Girl" Released: July 29, 2016

Generationwhy is the debut studio album by American electronic music producer Zhu, released on July 29, 2016, by Columbia Records. The album features works and vocals from the likes of Maya Angelou, Jaymes Young, Nylo, Mitch Bell, Nikola Bedingfield, Adam Schmalholz, and Broods. The album followed after the success of ZHU's collaborative debut EP Genesis Series, released in 2015.

== Critical reception ==
Professional ratings
Review scores
Source	Rating
AllMusic	3.5/5 stars
The Guardian	3/5 stars
Pitchfork	4.8/10

Upon release, Generationwhy received mixed reviews. The Guardian found Generationwhy an "at times, beguiling blend of mid-tempo electronic pop." Noting that ZHU successfully assimilated a lot of current Balearic dance music "influences into something distinctly his own", the review also argued that not all the songs transcended "the tropes of the genre that inspired them." Drowned in Sound was somewhat less impressed: "The album is essentially a series of enjoyable yet unremarkable house-pop songs." That being said the reviewer found some redeeming qualities, "Unlike many of these artists, Zhu includes what might be a surprising amount of 'live' instrumentation which generally add to the noir feeling."

== Commercial performance ==
The album debuted at number 109 on the Billboard 200, selling 3,000 copies in its first week. It also debuted at number one on the Dance/Electronic Albums chart in the United States.

== Track listing ==
No.	Title	Writer(s)	Producer(s)	Length
1.	"Intro (Neon City)"	Steven Zhu; Maya Angelou	Zhu	1:09
2.	"Cold Blooded"	Zhu; Jaymes McFarland	Zhu	4:18
3.	"In the Morning"	Zhu; Rui da Silva; Cassandra Fox; Gary Kemp	Zhu	4:06
4.	"Secret Weapon"	Zhu; Andrea Landis	Zhu	4:03
5.	"Electrify Me"	Zhu	Zhu	4:15
6.	"Numb"	Zhu; Mitch Bell	Zhu	4:27
7.	"Palm of My Hand"	Zhu; Valentine Baran	Zhu	6:13
8.	"Money"	Zhu; Bell	Zhu	5:07
9.	"One Minute to Midnight"	Zhu	Zhu	4:15
10.	"Reaching"	Zhu; Nikola Rachelle Bedingfield	Zhu	4:31
11.	"Hometown Girl"	Zhu; McFarland	Zhu; Austin Languille	4:12
12.	"Good Life"	Zhu; Adam Schmalholz; Caleb Nott; Georgia Nott	Zhu	4:31
13.	"Generationwhy"	Zhu	Zhu	3:52
14.	"Working for It" (with Skrillex and THEY.) (bonus track)	Zhu; Sonny Moore; Dante Jones; Drew Love	Zhu; Skrillex	3:51
Total length:				59:00

=== Notes ===
- "Intro (Neon City)" features uncredited spoken word from poetic writer Maya Angelou.
- "Cold Blooded" features uncredited vocals from Jaymes Young.
- "In the Morning" features sampled lyrics from "Touch Me" by Rui da Silva.
- "Secret Weapon" features uncredited vocals from Nylo.
- "Palm of My Hand" features uncredited spoken word from Valentine Baran.
- "Reaching" features uncredited vocals from Nikola Bedingfield.
- "Hometown Girl" features uncredited vocals from Jaymes Young.
- "Good Life" features uncredited spoken word from Adam Schmalholz and uncredited vocals from Broods.

== Charts ==
Chart (2016)	Peak position
Australian Albums (ARIA)	35
New Zealand Heatseeker Albums (RMNZ)	1
Swiss Albums (Schweizer Hitparade)	39
US Billboard 200	109
US Heatseekers Albums (Billboard)	5
US Top Dance Albums (Billboard)	1
