= Majid Jordan =

Canadian R&B duo

- Origin: Toronto, Ontario, Canada
- Genres: R&B; alternative R&B; synth-pop; synthwave
- Years active: 2011–present
- Label: OVO Sound
- Members: Majid Al Maskati; Jordan Ullman
- Website: majidjordan.com

Majid Jordan is a Canadian R&B duo, composed of vocalist Majid Al Maskati and producer Jordan Ullman, both of whom originate from Toronto, Ontario. Formed in 2011, the duo signed with fellow Toronto native Drake's record label OVO Sound, then distributed by Warner Records, to release their debut extended play (EP), A Place Like This (2014). The duo are best known for their guest appearance on Drake's 2013 single "Hold On, We're Going Home", which peaked within the top five of both the Canadian Hot 100 and Billboard Hot 100.

== Beginnings ==
Majid Jordan was formed in 2011 by Majid Hani Al Maskati (born October 22, 1990), originally from Bahrain, and Jordan Kenneth Cooke Ullman (born September 8, 1993), originally from Toronto, Ontario, after they met each other at Majid's birthday party at a bar in Toronto. Both were students at the University of Toronto, and later that week they began working on music together in Jordan's dorm, releasing their first official single, "Hold Tight", in just one day, which they posted anonymously on SoundCloud. Working between Ullman's dorm room and his parents' basement, they launched their first joint EP titled Afterhours on SoundCloud under the pseudonym Good People. Noah "40" Shebib, producer for the Toronto rapper Drake, was impressed by their Afterhours EP, and he signed them to his OVO Sound record label.

== Career ==
=== 2013–2016: A Place Like This and Majid Jordan ===
In 2013, Majid Jordan co-produced and were credited to be featured on Drake's track "Hold On, We're Going Home", which was included from his platinum-selling album Nothing Was the Same. "Hold On, We're Going Home" went on to become Drake's most successful single-charting in several countries, including United States, Canada, United Kingdom, Australia, and New Zealand.

On July 7, 2014, Majid Jordan released their first official single as a duo through SoundCloud. On July 17, 2014, ten days later, they released their official debut EP, A Place Like This, which was digitally through OVO Sound, the record label co-founded by rapper Drake. They went on to release music videos for three of the songs from the EP, including the title track "A Place Like This", "Her", and "Forever".

On July 10, 2015, Drake premiered their first single, titled "My Love" for their upcoming debut studio album on Apple's Beats 1 radio, during an interview with radio host Zane Lowe; their label boss is also featured on the track. After its premiere it was released straight to Apple Music and the iTunes Store.

In February 2016, the duo released its self-titled debut by OVO sound, featuring a song with Drake, called "My Love". On February 17, 2016, the duo also revealed their first-ever North American tour starting with a show in San Francisco, with other appearances were scheduled for Miami, Brooklyn, Atlanta, Toronto, Chicago, and Los Angeles.

=== 2017–2019: The Space Between ===
On April 21, 2017, Majid Jordan released "Phases" as the lead single from their second studio album. Its music video was released on May 25, 2017.

Majid Jordan released "One I Want" as the second single from their sophomore album on June 15, 2017. The song features a guest appearance from OVO labelmate PartyNextDoor. A music video was released on July 7, 2017.

On July 31, 2017, Majid Jordan announced that their sophomore album, The Space Between, would be released in the fall.

On September 29, 2017, Majid Jordan released "My Imagination" featuring OVO labelmate Dvsn as the third single from The Space Between. It was released along with the album pre-order. The album was released on October 27, 2017.

On September 7, 2018, Zhu released his second studio album, Ringos Desert, which features a guest appearance from Majid Jordan on the song "Coming Home." That same day, Majid Jordan released two songs titled "Spirit" and "All Over You".

On July 24, 2019, Majid Jordan released "Caught Up," a song that features Khalid. The music video premiered on the Majid Jordan YouTube page the same day.

On July 25, 2019, DJ Snake released his album, Carte Blanche, which features a guest appearance from Majid Jordan on the song "Recognize." A remix of the song which features the French DJ Mercer, was released on September 27, 2019.

Majid Jordan released a song titled "Superstar" on October 4, 2019.

=== 2020–present ===
==== Wildest Dreams (2021) ====
On April 5, 2021, after a year-long hiatus and break from social media, Majid Jordan released their lead single "Waves of Blue" from their third studio album.

On June 18, 2021, Majid Jordan released "Been Through That" as the second single from their third studio album. The single premiered on the SiriusXM OVO Sound 42 Radio channel.

Majid Jordan released "Summer Rain" as the third single from their third studio album on September 17, 2021.

On October 3, 2021, Majid Jordan announced that their third studio album, Wildest Dreams, would be released on October 22, 2021. The album marks the tenth anniversary of the duo forming, and the release date is on Majid Al Maskati's birthday.

Majid Jordan released their fourth single, "Forget About the Party", from their third studio album. It premiered on October 18, 2021, on the Apple Music 1 Zane Lowe Show.

==== Good People (2023) ====
On November 3, 2023, Majid Jordan released their fourth studio album, Good People, through OVO Sound.

==== Two Roads (2026) ====
In August 2026, Majid Jordan announced their fifth studio album, Two Roads, scheduled for release on August 28, 2026, through OVO Sound. The lead singles "Cold" and "See You Again" preceded the album.

== Discography ==
=== Studio albums ===
List of studio albums, with selected chart positions and sales figures
Title	Album details	Peak chart positions						
Title	Album details	CAN	AUS	UK	UK R&B	US	US R&B /HH	US R&B
Majid Jordan	Released: February 5, 2016; Label: OVO Sound, Warner Bros.; Formats: CD, LP, cassette, digital download	20	87	145	18	69	12	6
The Space Between	Released: October 27, 2017; Label: OVO Sound, Warner Bros.; Formats: CD, LP, digital download	30	—	—	38	74	35	9
Wildest Dreams	Released: October 22, 2021; Label: OVO Sound, Warner; Formats: CD, LP, digital download	30	—	—	—	—	—	—
Good People	Released: November 3, 2023; Label: OVO Sound; Format: Digital download	—	—	—	—	—	—	—
Two Roads	Released: August 28, 2026; Label: OVO Sound; Format: Digital download	—	—	—	—	—	—	—
"—" denotes a recording that did not chart or was not released in that territory.

=== Extended plays ===
List of extended plays, with selected chart positions
Title	EP details	Peak chart positions	
Title	EP details	US R&B /HH	US R&B
A Place Like This	Released: July 17, 2014; Label: OVO Sound, Warner Bros.; Format: Digital download	31	19

=== Singles ===
==== As lead artist ====
List of singles as lead artist, with selected chart positions, showing year released and album name
Title	Year	Peak chart positions				Certifications	Album
Title	Year	CAN	NZ Hot	US R&B	US Rhy.	Certifications	Album
"A Place Like This"	2014	—	—	—	—		A Place Like This
"Her"	2014	—	—	—	—		A Place Like This
"Forever"	2015	—	—	—	—		A Place Like This
"My Love" (featuring Drake)	2015	—	—	—	—	MC: Gold	Majid Jordan
"Something About You"	2015	—	—	—	20		Majid Jordan
"Phases"	2017	—	—	—	—		The Space Between
"One I Want" (featuring PartyNextDoor)	2017	—	—	25	—	MC: Gold	The Space Between
"Body Talk"	2017	—	—	—	—		The Space Between
"Gave Your Love Away"	2018	—	—	—	—		The Space Between
"Caught Up" (featuring Khalid)	2019	—	21	—	—		Non-album singles
"Superstar"	2019	—	—	—	—		Non-album singles
"Waves of Blue"	2021	33	—	11	32		Wildest Dreams
"Been Through That"	2021	—	—	—	—		Wildest Dreams
"Summer Rain"	2021	—	—	—	—		Wildest Dreams
"Forget About the Party"	2021	—	—	—	—		Wildest Dreams
"Stars Align" (featuring Drake)	2021	56	37	—	26		Wildest Dreams
"Different" (with Nonso Amadi)	2023	—	—	—	—		When It Blooms
"Waiting for You" (featuring Naomi Sharon)	2023	—	—	—	—		Good People
"Hands Tied"	2023	—	—	—	—		Good People
"Violet"	2023	—	—	—	—		Good People
"Life 2"	2024	—	—	—	—		Non-album single
"Cold"	2026	—	—	—	—		Two Roads
"See You Again"	2026	—	—	—	—		Two Roads
"Two Roads"	2026	—	—	—	—		Two Roads
"Strangers"	2026	—	—	—	—		Two Roads
"—" denotes a recording that did not chart or was not released in that territory.

==== As featured artist ====
List of singles as featured artist, with selected chart positions and certifications, showing year released and album name
Title	Year	Peak chart positions								Certifications	Album
Title	Year	CAN	AUS	IRE	NZ	UK	US	US R&B /HH	US R&B	Certifications	Album
"Hold On, We're Going Home" (Drake featuring Majid Jordan)	2013	5	8	7	9	4	4	1	1	MC: Platinum; ARIA: 8× Platinum; BPI: 3× Platinum; RIAA: 9× Platinum; RMNZ: 5× Platinum	Nothing Was the Same
"Coming Home" (ZHU featuring Majid Jordan)	2018	—	—	—	—	—	—	—	—		Ringos Desert
"—" denotes a recording that did not chart or was not released in that territory.

=== Other charted songs ===
List of songs, with selected chart positions, showing year released and album name
Title	Year	Peak chart positions					Album
Title	Year	CAN	UK	US	US R&B /HH	US R&B	Album
"Summers Over Interlude" (Drake featuring Majid Jordan)	2016	88	142	— (Note: "Summers Over Interlude" did not enter the Billboard Hot 100, but peaked at number two on the Bubbling Under Hot 100 Singles chart, which acts as an extension to the Hot 100.)	— (Note: "Summers Over Interlude" did not enter the Hot R&B/Hip-Hop Songs chart, but peaked at number one on the Bubbling Under R&B/Hip-Hop Singles chart, which acts as an extension to the Hot R&B/Hip-Hop Songs chart.)	14	Views
"—" denotes a recording that did not chart or was not released in that territory.

=== Guest appearances ===
List of non-single guest appearances, with other performing artists, showing year released and album name
Title	Year	Other artist(s)	Album
"Summers Over Interlude"	2016	Drake	Views
"Move Together"	2016	Somewhere Else	Non-album single
"Chilli Peppers"	2016	Roy Woods	Nocturnal
"Intro"	2017	PARTYNEXTDOOR	Colours 2 (SoundCloud Version)
"Coming Home"	2018	Zhu	Ringos Desert
"Recognize"	2019	DJ Snake	Carte Blanche
"Open"	2021	Khalid	Scenic Drive

=== Music videos ===
==== As lead artist ====
List of music videos as lead artist, with directors, showing year released
Title	Year	Director(s)
"A Place Like This"	2014	Common Good
"Her"	2014	Common Good
"Forever"	2015	Common Good
"My Love" (featuring Drake)	2015	Common Good
"Something About You"	2015	Common Good
"King City"	2016	Common Good
"Learn from Each Other"	2016	Ben Strebel
"Every Step Every Way"	2016	Common Good
"Make It Work"	2016	Aaron A
"Small Talk"	2016	Kid. Studio
"Phases"	2017	Jordan Eady
"One I Want" (featuring PartyNextDoor)	2017	Adrian Martinez
"Body Talk"	2017	Common Good
"Gave Your Love Away"	2018	Common Good
"All Over You"	2018	
"Caught Up" (featuring Khalid)	2019	
"Waves of Blue"	2021	Matthew Daniel Siskin
"Summer Rain"	2021	Matthew Daniel Siskin
"Hands Tied"	2023	

==== As featured artist ====
List of music videos as featured artist, with directors, showing year released
Title	Year	Director(s)
"Hold On, We're Going Home" (Drake featuring Majid Jordan)	2013	Bill Pope

== Production discography ==
=== Singles produced ===
List of singles as either producer or co-producer, with selected chart positions and certifications, showing year released and album name
Title	Year	Peak chart positions								Certifications	Album
Title	Year	CAN	AUS	IRL	NZ	UK	US	US R&B /HH	US R&B	Certifications	Album
"Hold On, We're Going Home" (Drake featuring Majid Jordan)	2013	4	8	7	9	4	4	1	1	MC: Platinum; ARIA: 2× Platinum; BPI: Platinum; RIAA: 3× Platinum; RMNZ: Gold	Nothing Was the Same
"A Place Like This" (Majid Jordan)	2014	—	—	—	—	—	—	—	—		A Place Like This
"My Love" (Majid Jordan featuring Drake)	2015	—	—	—	—	—	—	—	—		Majid Jordan
"Something About You" (Majid Jordan)	2015	—	—	—	—	—	—	—	—		Majid Jordan
"For Free" (DJ Khaled featuring Drake)	2016	47	70	—	—	25	13	4	—		Major Key
"—" denotes a recording that did not chart or was not released in that territory.

=== 2013 ===
Drake – Nothing Was the Same

- 08. "Hold On, We're Going Home" (featuring Majid Jordan) (produced with Nineteen85, add. production by 40)

Beyoncé – Beyoncé

- 09. "Mine" (featuring Drake) (produced by 40, add. production by Majid Jordan & Omen)

=== 2014 ===
Majid Jordan – A Place Like This

- 01. "Forever"
- 02. "All I Do"
- 03. "Her"
- 04. "U"
- 05. "A Place Like This"

=== 2016 ===
Majid Jordan – Majid Jordan

- 01. "Learn From Each Other" (produced with Illangelo)
- 02. "Make It Work"
- 03. "My Love" (featuring Drake) (produced by Nineteen85 & Illangelo, co-produced by Majid Jordan & 40)
- 04. "Small Talk"
- 05. "Pacifico"
- 06. "Shake Shake Shake"
- 07. "Love Is Always There"
- 08. "Warm"
- 09. "Something About You" (produced with Illangelo)
- 10. "Day and Night"
- 11. "King City" (produced with Nineteen85)
- 12. "Every Step Every Way"

Drake – Views

- 04. "Feel No Ways" (add. production by 40 & Kanye West)
- 14. "Childs Play" (produced by 40, add. production by Majid Jordan, Metro Boomin & Nineteen85)

DJ Khaled – Major Key

- 02. "For Free" (featuring Drake) (produced with Nineteen85)

=== 2017 ===
Majid Jordan – The Space Between

- 01. "Intro"
- 02. "Gave Your Love Away"
- 03. "OG Heartthrob"
- 04. "Body Talk" (produced with Stargate)
- 05. "Not Ashamed"
- 06. "One I Want" (featuring PartyNextDoor)
- 07. "You"
- 08. "Phases"
- 09. "Asleep"
- 10. "What You Do To Me"
- 11. "My Imagination" (featuring Dvsn) (produced with Nineteen85)
- 12. "The Space Between"
- 13. "Outro"

=== 2021 ===
Majid Jordan – Wildest Dreams

- 01. "Dancing on a Dream" (featuring Swae Lee) (produced with KOZ)
- 02. "Summer Rain" (produced with KOZ)
- 03. "Stars Align" (featuring Drake) (produced by OZ & Dez Wright)
- 04. "Waves of Blue" (produced with KOZ)
- 05. "Wildest Dreams" (produced with KOZ)
- 06. "Forget About the Party" (produced with KOZ)
- 07. "Been Through That"
- 08. "Life Worth Living" (produced with KOZ)
- 09. "Love Unconditional"
- 10. "Sway" (featuring Diddy)
- 11. "Sweet" (produced with Nineteen85)

=== Remixes ===
- 2016: Majid Jordan - "My Love" (featuring Drake) (Remix)
- 2022: Lila Drew - "2023 (Majid Jordan Remix)"
- 2022: Lila Drew - "2023 (Majid Jordan VIP Remix)"
- 2023: &ME, Rampa & Adam Port - "Confusion" (feat. Ali Love) (Majid Jordan Remix)

== Tours ==
- Majid Jordan Tour (2016)
- Majid Jordan II Tour (2016)
- Space Between Tour (2018)
- Wildest Dreams Tour (2021)
- Good People Live (2023)
- Good People Live Part II (2024)

== Awards and nominations ==
Year	Ceremony	Nominated work	Category	Result
2014	iHeartRadio Music Awards	"Hold On, We're Going Home" (with Drake)	Hip-Hop/R&B Song of the Year	Nominated
2014	iHeartRadio Music Awards	"Hold On, We're Going Home" (with Drake)	Song of the Year	Nominated
2014	Billboard Music Awards	"Hold On, We're Going Home" (with Drake)	Top R&B Song	Nominated
2014	World Music Awards	"Hold On, We're Going Home" (with Drake)	World's Best Song	Nominated
2014	Much Music Video Awards	"Hold On, We're Going Home" (with Drake)	International Video of the Year By a Canadian	Won
2014	BET Awards	"Hold On, We're Going Home" (with Drake)	Best Collaboration	Nominated
2014	MTV Video Music Awards	"Hold On, We're Going Home" (with Drake)	Best Hip-Hop Video	Won
2014	Soul Train Music Awards	"Hold On, We're Going Home" (with Drake)	Best Hip-Hop Song of the Year	Nominated
2014	Soul Train Music Awards	"Hold On, We're Going Home" (with Drake)	Song of the Year	Nominated
2015	Juno Awards	"Hold On, We're Going Home" (with Drake)	Single of the Year	Nominated
2015	Much Music Video Awards	"Her"	Best Director	Nominated
2015	Much Music Video Awards	"Her"	Video of the Year	Nominated
2015	Much Music Video Awards	"Forever"	Best MuchFact Video	Won
2016	Much Music Video Awards	"Something About You"	Best Director	Nominated
2016	Much Music Video Awards	"My Love" (with Drake)	Best MuchFact Video	Won
2016	Much Music Video Awards	"Every Step Every Way"	Best Post-Production	Won
