= Hold On, We're Going Home =

2013 single by Drake featuring Majid Jordan

Single by Drake featuring Majid Jordan

from the album Nothing Was the Same
- Released: August 7, 2013
- Genre: R&B; synth-pop; disco
- Length: 3:47
- Label: Aspire; OVO; Young Money; Cash Money; Republic
- Songwriters: Aubrey Graham; Majid Al Maskati; Jordan Ullman; Noah Shebib; Paul Jefferies
- Producers: 40; Nineteen85; Majid Jordan

Drake singles chronology
"No Guns Allowed" (2013)	"Hold On, We're Going Home" (2013)	"Live For" (2013)

Majid Jordan singles chronology
"Hold On, We're Going Home" (2013)	"A Place Like This" (2014)

Music video
- "Hold On, We're Going Home" on YouTube

"Hold On, We're Going Home" is a song by Canadian rapper Drake, featuring R&B duo Majid Jordan, released by Young Money Entertainment, Cash Money Records, and Republic Records and OVO Sound on August 7, 2013 as the third single from Drake's third studio album, Nothing Was the Same (2013). It was produced by Majid Jordan themselves, as well as OVO Sound cohorts Noah "40" Shebib and Nineteen85, all of whom co-wrote the song with Drake. First released for digital download following the 2013 OVO Fest, the song was later serviced to mainstream and rhythmic contemporary radio on August 13 of that year.

"Hold On, We're Going Home" peaked at number one in South Africa, number four on the US Billboard Hot 100, the UK Singles Chart, and in Denmark and Lebanon, as well as number five on the singles chart in his native Canada. It is certified Diamond in the US, eight-times Platinum in Australia, and Platinum or higher in seven additional countries. The song received praise from music critics, and was named the best song of 2013 by Pitchfork Media as well as number 21 on its "Best Tracks of the Decade" list. In 2021, it was listed at No. 129 on Rolling Stone's "Top 500 Greatest Songs of All Time".

== Background ==
Before "Hold On, We're Going Home" was released, Drake had an interview with MTV News about the song during the 4th Annual OVO Fest saying, "It's me and 40 just channeling our Quincy Jones/Michael Jackson production duo,... Obviously no offense to the greats, I know we're not anywhere near that — it's just us kinda doing our thing, humbly attempting." He also added, "It's not a rap record,... It's not 'Versace,' it's not 'Started from the Bottom.' In approaching this album I was like man, it would be great if we had a record that was played at weddings in 10 years or that people that are away from their families in the Armed Forces could listen to. Something that just [has] timeless writing, timeless melody. So I did it with the group that we signed to OVO called Majid Jordan."

== Music video ==
The music video is labeled a short film and set in Miami in 1985. It was directed by Bill Pope and released on September 24, 2013. In the video, Drake plays a kingpin whose lover (Ashley Moore) is kidnapped by a rival gang. Throughout the video, Drake does everything in his power to rescue her from mobster played by actor Micah Fitzgerald. Cameo appearances in the video included Fredo Santana, Steven Bauer, Johnny Simmons, Majid Jordan and ASAP Rocky among others.

== Commercial performance ==
"Hold On, We're Going Home" debuted at number five on the US Billboard Hot R&B/Hip-Hop Songs chart, making it Drake's thirty-third top 10 hit on the chart. This accomplishment broke the tie for second-most top ten hits with singer R. Kelly, only trailing behind rapper Lil Wayne, who has 36. The song also made the top ten in the Canadian Hot 100, peaking at number five, making it his highest-charting single in his home country. In the song's fifth week on the US Billboard Hot 100, it became Drake's 13th top ten hit, climbing at number eight. This feat gave him the most top ten hits of the year with four, including "Fuckin' Problems" (number 8), "Started from the Bottom" (number 6), and "Love Me" (number 9). The song reached number four on the Billboard Hot 100 chart, becoming Drake's first song to reach the top five of the Hot 100 since "Find Your Love". The song peaked at number one on the Billboard Hot R&B/Hip-Hop Songs chart. It sold over two million copies as of January 2014.

The song sold 207,000 copies in Canada in 2013.

The single reached a peak of number four in the United Kingdom, giving Drake his highest-peaking single there at the time ("One Dance" later reached number one in 2016). It also received heavy rotation on South African radio stations, peaking a number one on the South African Airplay Chart.

== Cover versions ==
The song has been covered by British artist Dev Hynes under his Blood Orange moniker, English band Arctic Monkeys, Brooklyn-based synthpop duo Holy Ghost!, The Saturdays, Lissie and Ella Henderson did a mashup of the song with John Newman's "Love Me Again". Conor Maynard did a medley with the song along Miley Cyrus's "Wrecking Ball" and Ellie Goulding's "Burn". He later performed a separate cover for the song.

In May 2014, The Voice contestant Christina Grimmie sang the song during the sixth season of the show.

In June 2014, Foster the People also covered the song on BBC Radio 1's Live Lounge.

In September 2014, Nick Mulvey also delivered an acoustic rendition of the song on BBC Radio 1's Live Lounge. American singer Pia Mia also made a cover of the song and it went viral gaining over 10 million views.

In October 2014, the song was also covered by progressive metalcore band Volumes on Punk Goes Pop Vol. 6.

In 2015, on the voice Australia Nathan Hawes did an acoustic version of this.

On 2020-04-03 UK Artist Nerina Pallot released a compilation of the lockdown sessions covers titled "Best In Show" featuring "Hold On, We're Going Home" on track 6.

== Track listing ==
Digital download
No.	Title	Length
1.	"Hold On, We're Going Home"	3:47

== Charts ==
=== Weekly charts ===
Chart (2013–2015)	Peak position
Australia (ARIA)	8
Austria (Ö3 Austria Top 40)	72
Belgium (Ultratop 50 Flanders)	20
Belgium (Ultratop 50 Wallonia)	18
Belgium Urban (Ultratop)	6
Canada Hot 100 (Billboard)	5
Czech Republic Airplay (ČNS IFPI)	41
Czech Republic Singles Digital (ČNS IFPI)	50
Denmark (Tracklisten)	4
Euro Digital Song Sales (Billboard)	5
France (SNEP)	12
Germany (GfK)	27
Ireland (IRMA)	7
Italy (FIMI)	42
Lebanon (OLT20)	4
Mexico Airplay (Billboard)	46
Netherlands (Dutch Top 40)	11
Netherlands (Single Top 100)	12
New Zealand (Recorded Music NZ)	9
Scottish Singles Sales (Official Charts)	8
Slovakia Airplay (ČNS IFPI)	93
Slovenia (SloTop50)	43
South Africa Airplay (EMA)	1
Sweden (Sverigetopplistan)	22
Switzerland (Schweizer Hitparade)	40
UK Singles (Official Charts)	4
US Billboard Hot 100	4
US Hot R&B/Hip-Hop Songs (Billboard)	1
US Adult R&B Songs (Billboard)	5
US Adult Pop Airplay (Billboard)	19
US Dance Airplay (Billboard)	11
US Pop Airplay (Billboard)	4
US Rhythmic Airplay (Billboard)	1

=== Year-end charts ===
Chart (2013)	Position
Australia (ARIA)	59
Belgium (Ultratop Flanders)	95
Canada (Canadian Hot 100)	42
France (SNEP)	80
Netherlands (Dutch Top 40)	62
Netherlands (Single Top 100)	39
UK Singles (OCC)	31
US Billboard Hot 100	34
US Hot R&B/Hip-Hop Songs (Billboard)	9
US Mainstream Top 40 (Billboard)	47
US Rhythmic (Billboard)	7

Chart (2014)	Position
Canada (Canadian Hot 100)	49
US Billboard Hot 100	55
US Hot R&B/Hip-Hop Songs (Billboard)	18
US Rhythmic (Billboard)	21

=== Decade-end charts ===
Chart (2010–2019)	Position
US Hot R&B/Hip-Hop Songs (Billboard)	41

== Certifications ==
Region	Certification	Certified units/sales
Australia (ARIA)	8× Platinum	560,000^{‡}
Brazil (Pro-Música Brasil)	Platinum	60,000^{‡}
Canada (Music Canada)	Platinum	207,000
Denmark (IFPI Danmark)	3× Platinum	270,000^{‡}
Germany (BVMI)	Platinum	300,000^{‡}
Italy (FIMI)	Platinum	50,000^{‡}
Mexico (AMPROFON)	Platinum+Gold	90,000^{‡}
New Zealand (RMNZ)	5× Platinum	150,000^{‡}
Portugal (AFP)	Gold	10,000^{‡}
Spain (Promusicae)	Gold	30,000^{‡}
Sweden (GLF)	2× Platinum	80,000^{‡}
United Kingdom (BPI)	3× Platinum	1,800,000^{‡}
United States (RIAA)	Diamond	10,000,000^{‡}
Streaming
Denmark (IFPI Danmark)	2× Platinum	3,600,000^{†}
^{*} Sales figures based on certification alone.^{‡} Sales+streaming figures based on certification alone.^{†} Streaming-only figures based on certification alone.

== Release history ==
Country	Date	Format	Label
United States	August 7, 2013	Digital download	OVO; Aspire; Young Money; Cash Money; Republic
United States	August 13, 2013	Mainstream radio	OVO; Aspire; Young Money; Cash Money; Republic
United States	August 13, 2013	Rhythmic contemporary radio	OVO; Aspire; Young Money; Cash Money; Republic
United Kingdom	August 8, 2013	Urban contemporary radio	OVO; Aspire; Young Money; Cash Money; Republic

== See also ==
- List of number-one singles of 2013 (South Africa)
