= Ringos Desert =

Studio album by Zhu
- Released: September 7, 2018
- Recorded: 2018
- Genre: Electronic
- Length: 60:00
- Label: Mind of a Genius
- Producer: Zhu

Zhu chronology
Generationwhy (2016)	Ringos Desert (2018)	Dreamland 2021 (2021)

Singles from Ringos Desert
- 1. "My Life" Released: March 5, 2018; 2. "Coming Home" Released: August 10, 2018

Ringos Desert is the second studio album by American electronic music producer Zhu, released on September 7, 2018 via Mind of a Genius label. The album features works and vocals from the likes of Tokimonsta, Majid Jordan, and Tame Impala. The album followed the success of ZHU's collaborative debut studio album Generationwhy, released in 2016.

== Critical reception ==
Upon release, Ringos Desert received favorable reviews. Dancing Astronaut praised Ringos Desert saying that "Every song is polished to absolute perfection, each sound given dedicated space to exist like modern art in an exhibit. Tucked into the songs is a cheeky dose of western sonic flavor that seasons the entire album". Billboard magazine characterized songs on the album as having "a right clubbiness", "a ghostly R&B touch", and a "romantic struggle narrative with a strong sentiment of self-empowerment".

== Commercial performance ==
The album debuted at number 15 on the Billboard Top Dance/Electronic Albums. The single "My Life (feat. Tame Impala)" peaked at No. 20 on the US Dance charts.

== Track listing ==
All tracks produced by Zhu, except for "Still Want U", produced alongside Karnaval Blues, and "Coming Home", produced alongside Jordan Ullman.

No.	Title	Writer(s)	Length
1.	"Stormy Love, NM." (featuring Joy)	Steven Zhu; Mitch Bell; Olivia McCarthy	3:47
2.	"Still Want U" (featuring Karnaval Blues)	Zhu; George MacDonald; Y'akoto; Fidelis Antwi	3:33
3.	"Guilty Love"	Zhu; Bell; Daniel Wilson	4:33
4.	"Desert Woman"	Zhu; Bell	6:14
5.	"Provocateur"	Zhu; Bell	4:11
6.	"Burn Babylon" (featuring Keznamdi and Daniel Wilson)	Zhu; Bell; Aaron Leibowitz; Wilson; Keznamdi MacDonald	4:07
7.	"Save Me" (featuring Herizen)	Zhu; Bell; Leibowitz	4:54
8.	"Magenta Sky Interlude"	Zhu; Jiddu Krishnamurdi
9.	"Ghost in My Bed"	Zhu; Bell	4:59
10.	"Love That Hurts" (featuring Karnaval Blues and Indiana)	Zhu; G. MacDonald; Lauren Hansen; John Beck	3:00
11.	"Light It Up" (featuring Tokimonsta)	Zhu; Jennifer Lee	3:18
12.	"Drowning"	Zhu; Bell; Leibowitz; Jason Evigan	3:07
13.	"Coming Home" (featuring Majid Jordan)	Zhu; Majid Al Maskati; Jordan Ullman	3:32
14.	"Waters of Monaco"	Zhu; Bell; Leibowitz	5:27
15.	"My Life" (with Tame Impala)	Zhu; Kevin Parker	4:54
Total length:			60:00

== Charts ==
Chart (2018)	Peak position
US Top Dance/Electronic Albums (Billboard)	15
