= A Place Like This (song) =

Single by Majid Jordan

from the album A Place Like This
- Released: July 7, 2014
- Genre: PBR&B
- Length: 4:16
- Label: OVO Sound; Warner Bros.
- Songwriter(s): Majid Al Maskati
- Producer(s): Majid Jordan

Majid Jordan singles chronology
"Hold On, We're Going Home" (2013)	"A Place Like This" (2014)	"Her" (2014)

Music video
- "A Place Like This" on YouTube

"A Place Like This" is a song by Canadian R&B duo Majid Jordan. The song was released as the lead single and is the title track from their debut EP A Place Like This.

== Release ==
The song was released on July 7, 2014, through SoundCloud. It was released as the lead single from their debut EP A Place Like This.

== Music video ==
The music video was released on July 7, 2014, on YouTube, it was directed by Jamie Webster of Common Good. The introspective visuals take fans through one woman's journey through a steamy, sexy party— inter cut with appearances from the duo. The aforementioned woman moves from party goer to party goer as she searches for love and eventually finds it by the end of the video, as she gives the object of her affection a time that he will never forget. Or wake up from.

== Track listing ==
Digital download
No.	Title	Writer(s)	Producer(s)	Length
1.	"A Place Like This"	Majid Al Maskati	Majid Jordan	4:16

== Personnel ==
- Majid Jordan – primary artist

== Release history ==
Country	Date	Format	Label
Worldwide	July 7, 2014	Digital download	OVO Sound; Warner Bros.
