= Faded (Zhu song) =

Single by Zhu

from the EP The Nightday
- Released: April 20, 2014
- Recorded: 2013
- Genre: Deep house; darkwave
- Length: 3:46 (album version); 2:46 (radio edit)
- Label: Mind of a Genius; Spinnin'
- Songwriters: Steven Zhu, Julian Perretta
- Producer: Zhu

Zhu singles chronology
"Faded" (2014)	"Automatic" (2015)

"Faded" is the debut single by American electronic musician Zhu. An extended play of remixes was released on June 29, 2014. "Faded" peaked at number one on the US Dance chart.

One of the first radio stations to pick up "Faded", the alternative music orientated station Triple J, gave the song significant airplay which was responsible for its success in Australia. Subsequent to its success on Triple J, more mainstream stations began to play it, giving the song a larger audience. Eventually, "Faded" gained momentum internationally, becoming a club hit largely thanks to its initial success on Triple J. A black-and-white music video for the song was released on May 6, 2014. The track was nominated for Best Dance Recording at the 57th Annual Grammy Awards, but lost to "Rather Be" by Clean Bandit featuring Jess Glynne. Despite this, the song came to be one of Zhu's most successful singles to date since its release in 2014.

== Track listing ==
Digital download

No.	Title	Length
1.	"Faded"	3:46

Remixes

No.	Title	Length
1.	"Faded" (The Magician Remix)	5:34
2.	"Faded" (Odesza Remix)	3:58
3.	"Faded" (Amtrac Remix)	5:17
4.	"Faded" (Lido Remix)	4:24
5.	"Faded" (Tâches Remix)	5:00
6.	"Faded" (Steve James Remix)	4:49
7.	"Faded" (Toyo Remix)	3:58
8.	"Faded" (Redondo Rhode to Home Mix)	7:19
9.	"Faded" (A. Abdukhalikov Remix)	3:36
10.	"Faded" (DJ Snake and DJ Mustard Remix)	3:26

== Charts ==
=== Weekly charts ===
Weekly chart performance for "Faded"
Chart (2014–2015)	Peak position
Australia (ARIA)	3
Austria (Ö3 Austria Top 40)	15
Belgium (Ultratop 50 Flanders)	7
Belgium (Ultratop 50 Wallonia)	11
Bulgaria (Airplay Top5)	2
Denmark (Tracklisten)	2
France (SNEP)	41
Germany (GfK)	18
Hungary (Dance Top 40)	6
Hungary (Single Top 40)	4
Ireland (IRMA)	39
Netherlands (Single Top 100)	69
Poland (Polish Airplay Top 100)	3
Poland (Dance Top 50)	1
Russia Airplay (TopHit)	1
Scotland Singles (OCC)	3
Switzerland (Schweizer Hitparade)	49
UK Dance (OCC)	1
UK Singles (OCC)	3
Ukraine Airplay (TopHit)	3
US Hot Dance/Electronic Songs (Billboard)	12
US Dance Club Songs (Billboard)	1

=== Year-end charts ===
Year-end chart performance for "Faded"
Chart (2014)	Position
Australia (ARIA)	32
Belgium (Ultratop Flanders)	54
Belgium (Ultratop Wallonia)	84
Hungary (Single Top 40)	59
Italy (Musica e dischi)	46
Poland (ZPAV)	31
Russia Airplay (TopHit)	36
UK Singles (Official Charts Company)	96
US Hot Dance/Electronic Songs (Billboard)	40
Chart (2015)	Position
Hungary (Dance Top 40)	23
US Hot Dance/Electronic Songs (Billboard)	83

== Certifications ==
Certifications for "Faded"
Region	Certification	Certified units/sales
Australia (ARIA)	Platinum	70,000^{^}
Canada (Music Canada)	Gold	40,000^{*}
Germany (BVMI)	Gold	150,000^{‡}
Italy (FIMI)	Gold	15,000^{‡}
New Zealand (RMNZ)	2× Platinum	60,000^{‡}
United Kingdom (BPI)	Platinum	600,000^{‡}
United States	—	211,000
Streaming
Denmark (IFPI Danmark)	Platinum	2,600,000^{†}
^{*} Sales figures based on certification alone.^{^} Shipments figures based on certification alone.^{‡} Sales+streaming figures based on certification alone.^{†} Streaming-only figures based on certification alone.

== See also ==
- List of number-one dance singles of 2014 (U.S.)
