= They (duo) =

American R&B duo

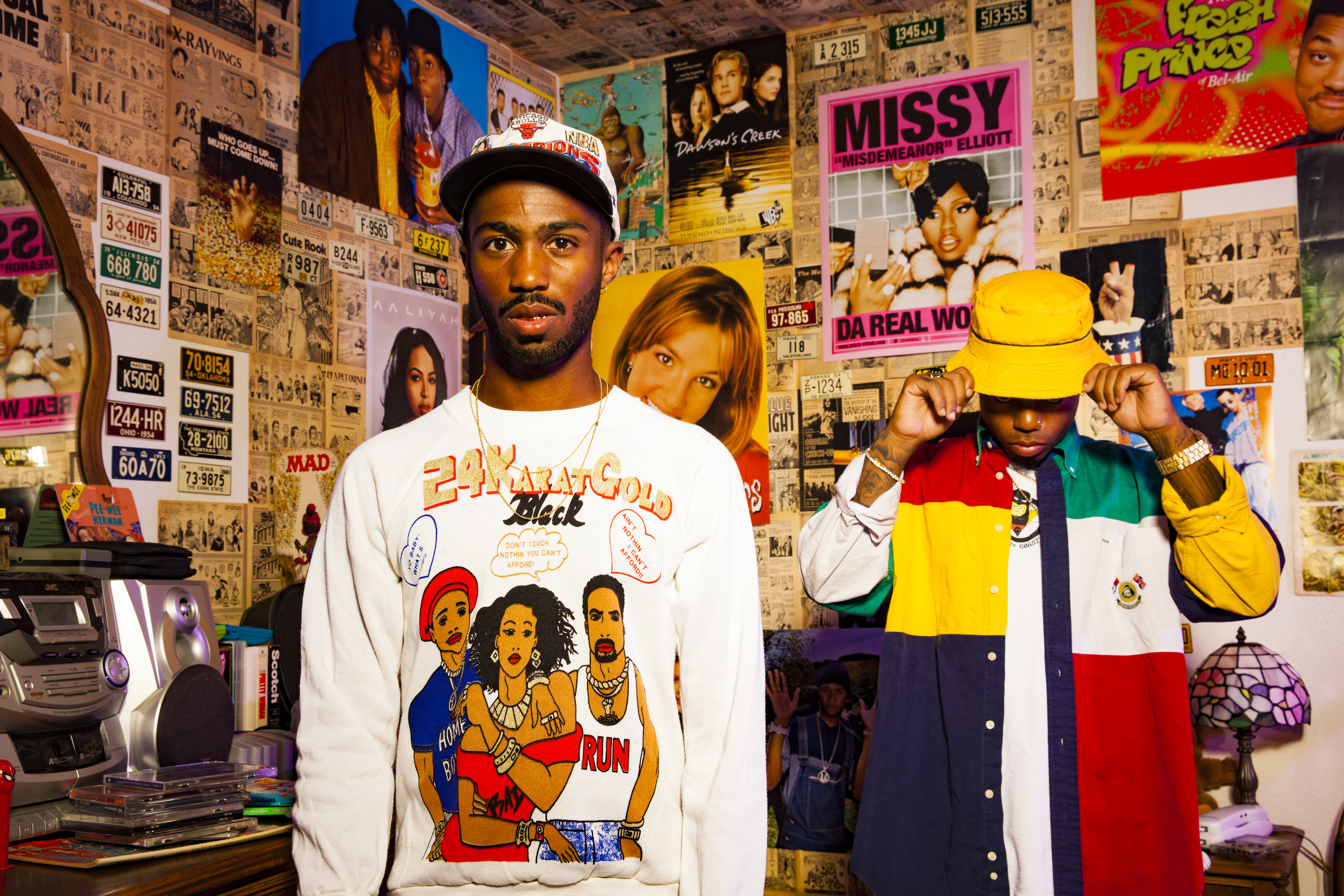
- They in 2019; Dante Jones (left) and Drew Love

Background information
- Origin: Los Angeles, California, US
- Genres: R&B; hip-hop; rock; pop
- Years active: 2015–present
- Labels: Avant Garden; Island (current); Warner (former)
- Members: Dante Jones; Andrew "Drew Love" Neely
- Website: unofficialthey.com

They (stylised THEY.) is an American R&B duo from Los Angeles, California, consisting of Dante Jones and Andrew "Drew Love" Neely. The duo started their career in 2015, releasing the debut extended play Nü Religion, which received critical acclaim. That year, they released the commercially successful single "Working for It" in collaboration with Zhu and Skrillex. In 2016, they began touring with singer Bryson Tiller. The following year, the duo released their debut studio album, Nü Religion: Hyena. In 2020, They signed to Avant Garden Records under Island Records and released their second studio album, The Amanda Tape, on October 23, 2020.

== Career ==
=== 2015: Formation and Nü Religion ===
Dante Jones was born in Denver, Colorado, while Andrew Neely was born in Washington, D.C. The duo was formed in Los Angeles, California in 2015. On October 13, 2015, the duo released their debut extended play, Nü Religion, through Mind of a Genius Records and Warner Bros. Records. The project, which includes three songs in its track listing, received favorable reviews from music critics. Additionally, the duo began gaining support from record producer Timbaland. While talking about the project in an interview with The Fader magazine, Drew said; "Nü Religion is a new way of thinking. As individuals the way we have approached life and the art of music has always been left of center; even from youth. It's been all about finding a way to incorporate that into a cohesive musical project that we are proud of and that people enjoy. We think we've done that." On October 22, 2015, "Working for It", a collaboration single by They, Zhu and Skrillex, was released. The song peaked at number 30 in Australia and number 71 in the United Kingdom. The song appeared in Zhu's EP, Genesis Series and debut studio album, Generationwhy.

=== 2016–2018: Nü Religion: Hyena ===
In early 2016, the duo joined singer Bryson Tiller as opening act for his Trapsoul Tour. In summer 2016, the duo released the singles, "Say When" and "Deep End", both of which managed to enter the Billboard Twitter Emerging Artists chart. On August 8, 2016, THEY. was named "New band of the week" by The Guardian newspaper. In October 2016, the duo was included in Complex magazine's "Best New Musicians in 2016 Across America" list. On February 24, 2017, the duo released their debut studio album, Nü Religion: Hyena. Following the release of their album, They solidified their breakthrough year by performing at the Coachella Valley Music and Arts Festival.

=== 2018–2019: Fireside EP ===
In 2018, the duo also joined Grammy-nominated artist 6LACK as an opening act for his From East Atlanta with Love tour. They also released their collaborative EP Fireside in 2018, which features Wiz Khalifa, Jessie Reyez, Jeremih, Vic Mensa, Ty Dolla Sign, and Gallant. This project was influenced by 90s R&B, soul music, trap music, and a recent genre of hip hop known as emo rap, in which the instrumental is guitar-driven.

=== 2020–present: The Amanda Tape ===
They signed to Avant Garden Records and in June 2020, the duo returned for the release of their new single "Count Me In" from their forthcoming album, The Amanda Tape, marking their first official release of 2020. They and Tinashe linked up in July for the throwback R&B jam "Play Fight" as the second single from The Amanda Tape.

== Influences ==
The duo is influenced by artists like Taking Back Sunday, New Edition, Babyface and Kurt Cobain.

Their 2018 EP Fireside, which features Wiz Khalifa, Jessie Reyez, Jeremih, Vic Mensa, Ty Dolla Sign, and Gallant has been influenced by 90s R&B, soul music, trap music, and a recent genre of hip hop known as emo rap, in which the instrumental is guitar-driven.

== Discography ==
=== Studio albums ===
List of studio albums, with selected details
Title	Details
Nü Religion: Hyena	Released: February 24, 2017; Label: Mind of a Genius, Warner Bros.; Format: LP, digital download
The Amanda Tape	Released: October 23, 2020; Label: Avant Garden, Island; Format: LP, digital download
Nü Moon	Released: April 7, 2023; Label: Avant Garden, Island; Format: LP, digital download
Love.Jones	Released: February 14, 2025; Label: Drink Sum Wtr; Format: LP, digital download

=== Extended plays ===
List of extended plays, with selected details
Title	Details
Nü Religion	Released: October 13, 2015; Label: Mind of a Genius, Warner Bros.; Format: Digital download
Fireside	Released: November 9, 2018; Label: Mind of a Genius; Format: Digital download

=== Singles ===
==== As lead artist ====
List of singles, with selected chart positions, showing year released and album name
Title	Year	Peak chart positions				Certifications	Album
Title	Year	AUS	FRA	UK	NZ Hot	Certifications	Album
"Working for It" (with Zhu and Skrillex)	2015	30	122	71	—	ARIA: Gold	Genesis Series / Generationwhy
"Say When"	2016	—	—	—	—		Nü Religion: Hyena
"Deep End"	2016	—	—	—	—		Nü Religion: Hyena
"What You Want"	2016	—	—	—	—		Nü Religion: Hyena
"U-Rite"	2017	—	—	—	—		Nü Religion: Hyena
"Thrive"	2018	—	—	—	—		Non-album singles
"Ain't the Same"	2018	—	—	—	—		Non-album singles
"Pops"	2018	—	—	—	—		Non-album singles
"What I Know Now" (featuring Wiz Khalifa)	2018	—	—	—	—		Fireside
"Broken" (featuring Jessie Reyez)	2018	—	—	—	—		Fireside
"Til I Die" (with Dillon Francis)	2019	—	—	—	—		Non-album singles
"Stop Playin'"	2019	—	—	—	—		Non-album singles
"Red Light Green Light"	2019	—	—	—	—		Non-album singles
"Count Me In" (with Kiana Ledé)	2020	—	—	—	—		The Amanda Tape
"Play Fight" (with Tinashe)	2020	—	—	—	22		The Amanda Tape
"All Mine"	2020	—	—	—	—		The Amanda Tape
"STCU" (with Juicy J)	2020	—	—	—	—		The Amanda Tape
"Losing Focus" (with Wale)	2020	—	—	—	—		The Amanda Tape
"Blü Moon"	2022	—	—	—	—		Nü Moon
"Comfortable" (featuring Fana Hues)	2022	—	—	—	—		Nü Moon
"Lonely" (featuring Bino Rideaux)	2022	—	—	—	—		Nü Moon
"Set Me Free"	2022	—	—	—	—		Nü Moon
"In the Mood" (featuring Yung Bleu)	2023	—	—	—	—		Nü Moon
"Riptide"	2023	—	—	—			Nü Moon
"Diamonds and Pearls"	2024	—	—	—	—		Love.Jones
"Straight Up"	2024	—	—	—	—		Love.Jones
"Choosin'"	2025	—	—	—	—		Love.Jones
"—" denotes a recording that did not chart or was not released in that territory.

==== As featured artist ====
Title	Year	Album
"Not Enough" (Lido featuring They)	2017	Non-album singles
"Problems (Rework)" (Moss Kena with They and Rapsody)	2018	Non-album singles
"Must've Been" (Remix) (Chromeo featuring DRAM and They)	2018	Non-album singles
"Hopscotch" (Remix) (Tinashe with They)	2020	Non-album singles
"What You Need" (Jae Stephens featuring They)	2021	And Friends
"Lock It Up" (Emotional Oranges featuring They)	2021	The Juicebox

=== Guest appearances ===
List of non-single guest appearances, with other performing artists, showing year released and album name
Title	Year	Album
"Boys" (Remix) (Charli XCX featuring They)	2017	Non-album single
"G2G TTYL" (Blackbear featuring They)	2017	Cybersex
"1000 Women" (Wiz Khalifa featuring They)	2022	Multiverse
"Goyard Bags" (Wiz Khalifa featuring They)	2022	Multiverse
"Surrender" (Rory featuring Emotional Oranges and They)	2023	I Thought It'd Be Different
