= Zhu (musician) =

American electronic musician (born 1989)

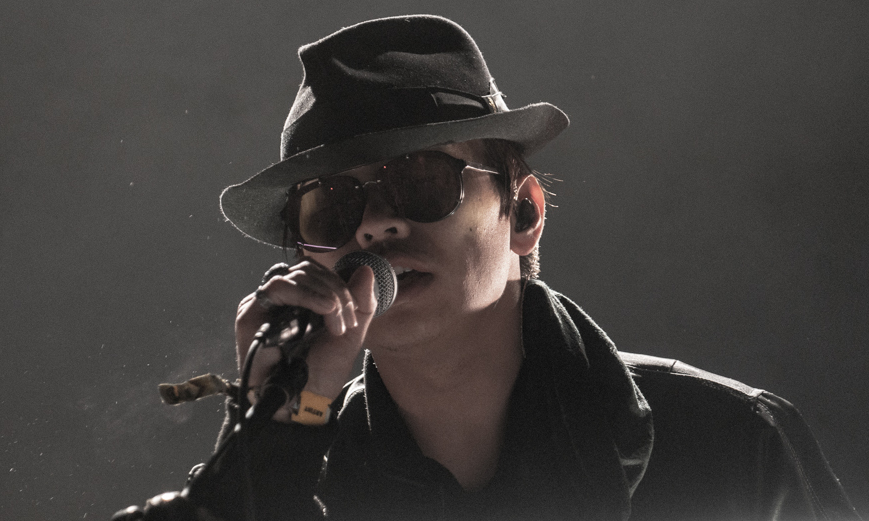
- Zhu performing in 2018

Background information
- Born: Steven Zhu; April 28, 1989 (age 37); San Francisco, California, U.S.
- Genres: Electronic; house; deep house
- Occupations: DJ; musician; record producer; singer; songwriter
- Instruments: Synthesizer; piano; horns; vocals
- Years active: 2013–present
- Labels: Astralwerks; Columbia; Mind of a Genius; Zhumusic, LLC
- Website: www.zhumusic.com

Steven Zhu, known mononymously as Zhu (/zuː/; stylized in all caps; born April 28, 1989), is an American DJ and singer who has been active since the beginning of 2014, signed to Mind of a Genius Records. Until mid-2014, Zhu remained anonymous, asking to be judged by his music alone. His debut album, Generationwhy, was released on July 29, 2016 and first premiered at Coachella during his closing set in the Sahara Tent. Zhu's Coachella performance was praised, with a writer for the New York Observer suggesting that he could be "the next Daft Punk". Since then, He has performed at major festivals around the world including Lollapolooza, Outside Lands, Governors Ball, Electric Daisy Carnival, Hard Summer, Austin City Limits, Sziget Festival, Ultra Music Festival, and many more.

== Early life ==
Zhu is of Chinese heritage and grew up in the San Francisco Bay Area where he attended St. Ignatius College Preparatory. He played in jazz bands and orchestral practices at school, and later studied music at the University of Southern California. A member of the Tau Kappa Epsilon fraternity, he graduated from the USC Thornton School of Music in 2011.

== Career ==
Zhu's first track, "Moves Like Ms Jackson", a mashup of several songs by Outkast, was released anonymously in February 2014 and was positively received by blogs and reviewers covering electronic music. Other tracks appeared on the music streaming site SoundCloud throughout February and March, followed by an EP titled The Nightday in April 2014, which earned a number 1 play of the week on Triple J.

The first single from The Nightday, titled "Faded", drew support from Pete Tong, who named it an "Essential New Tune" on his radio show on BBC Radio 1. "Faded" was released in March 2014, and quickly climbed the global charts, peaking at number 3 in Australia and the UK, and number 12 on the US Dance/Electronic chart. "Faded" was certified platinum in Australia in 2014 and was nominated for the Grammy Award for Best Dance Recording at the 57th Annual Grammy Awards. Another track, "Cocaine Model", was received positive reviews for his vocals and production.

In a November 2014 interview, Zhu's manager Jake Udell described the current music climate as "very black and white" and acknowledged that Zhu's race played a role in the decision to release and market his music anonymously, saying: "Some of us don't even know the limitations of our own prejudice. Rather than put those limitations to the test, we've created an engaging way for fans to focus on the music rather than who's behind it." Zhu stated in a February 2015 interview that "the project [Zhu] is all about art, and we try to make it about the songs and the response."

On May 15, 2015, Zhu appeared on Pete Tong's "After Hours" show and performed a 40-minute DJ mix, mostly consisting of unreleased remixes, and also announced the Nightday Collection clothing line. On November 6, 2015, Zhu released a collaborative EP titled Genesis Series. It featured appearances from Skrillex, AlunaGeorge, A-Trak, and Bone Thugs N Harmony, among others. The EP received critical acclaim for its diverse sound and diverse range of talent. "Working for It", the lead collaboration with Skrillex and They., reached the top 40 and was certified platinum in Australia. It also charted on the US Dance/Electronic chart.

In 2016, the single "In the Morning" was released. After his Neon City Tour, he announced that his debut album, Generationwhy, would be released on July 29, 2016, and that "In the Morning" was the first single from the album.

On June 13, 2016, Zhu released the title track, "Generationwhy", as the second single from the album.

Zhu's success carried over into 2017, where he was a featured performer in Ultra Music Festival 2017 in Miami on the live stage on March 24, 2017. His performance was positively received. Also in March, he released the single "Nightcrawler", which was followed by a second single "Intoxicate". Additionally, Zhu provided remixes of "Andromeda" by Gorillaz, "Bad and Boujee" by Migos, and "Feel It Still" by Portugal. The Man. That same year, he released his third EP, titled Stardustexhalemarrakechdreams, on August 18. The EP's lead single, titled "Dreams", is a collaboration with electronic music trio Nero. The EP's single "Chasing Marrakech" was featured by Apple in an ad for the iPhone XS and XS Max on September 14, 2018.

On April 26, 2018, Zhu released the first installment of his second studio album, Ringos Desert, as an extended play. The full album was made available five months later on September 7, comprising 14 tracks featuring Tame Impala, Majid Jordan, and Tokimonsta. An accompanying North American tour was announced in support of the album.

In 2019, Zhu released the song "Came for the Low", the music video for which featured 2020 United States presidential candidate Andrew Yang. The song was also featured in the third episode of the Marvel Cinematic Universe television series, The Falcon and the Winter Soldier, which was released onto Disney+ on April 2, 2021.

On May 14, 2020, he released the single "Only" in collaboration with Tinashe as the first single from his third studio album Dreamland 2021. Zhu Performed six sold out nights at Red Rocks Amphitheater in support of the album.

The shows featured his live backing band of guitarist Mitch Bell, saxophonist Aaron Leibowitz, and drummer Vince Fossett, with Zhu performing vocals and keyboards.

In July 2022, Zhu released his first mixtape, titled Musical Chairs Mixtape (Vol.1). The mixtape consists of seven songs, including a collaboration with the Grammy-nominated artist Elderbrook. Zhu supported a few dates for Swedish House Mafia on their 2022 American Tour.

In June 2023, Zhu embarked on his first headlining tour in five years. The news arrived alongside the announcement of his collaboration with the video game Mortal Kombat 1, for which Zhu produced an original track titled "Fatal".

In 2023, Zhu embarked on his third North American Tour, covering over 25 cities, including three sold out nights in Los Angeles at the Hollywood Palladium and three sold out nights in New York at the Brooklyn Mirage.

In March 2024, Zhu released his fourth album Grace featuring Sabrina Claudio, Banks, and others, which was recorded in Grace Cathedral with an accompanying film.

In 2026, Zhu released his fifth studio album, Black Midas, on April 24. The album marked a return to his dancefloor-oriented roots, drawing influence from deep house and melodic techno while emphasizing minimalism, atmosphere, and club-focused production. The project was shaped by Zhu’s renewed focus on extended DJ sets and intimate club performances, particularly through his "Blacklizt" concept. Several tracks were developed through live testing and multiple iterations based on audience response. The album was also influenced by personal events, including Zhu’s displacement during the 2025 Palisades wildfire in Southern California, which damaged his home and studio and informed the record’s themes of reconstruction and transformation. Black Midas featured collaborations with emerging and underground artists, including Joyia and GCBestBelieve, and was accompanied by a short film shot in Istanbul exploring themes of identity and artistic evolution.

== Discography ==
=== Studio albums ===
| Title | Album details | Peak chart positions | | | |
| Title | Album details | US | US Dance | AUS | CAN |
|---|---|---|---|---|---|
| Generationwhy | Released: July 29, 2016; Label: Mind of a Genius, Columbia; Format: CD, vinyl, digital download | 109 | 1 | 35 | 88 |
| Ringos Desert | Released: September 7, 2018; Label: Mind of a Genius; Format: Digital download, streaming | — | 15 | — | — |
| Dreamland 2021 | Released: April 30, 2021; Label: Astralwerks; Format: CD, digital download, vinyl, streaming | — | 11 | — | — |
| Grace | Released: March 15, 2024; Label: Astralwerks, Zhumusic; Format: CD, digital download, vinyl, streaming | — | — | — | — |
| Black Midas | Released: April 24, 2026; Label: BROKE, Blacklizt Sound Syndicate; Format: digital download, streaming | — | — | — | — |
"—" denotes an album that did not chart or was not released.

=== Extended plays ===
| Title | Details | Peak chart positions | | |
| Title | Details | US Dance | US Heat. | AUS |
|---|---|---|---|---|
| The Nightday | Released: April 20, 2014; Label: Mind of a Genius, Columbia; Formats: Digital download, CD, vinyl | 11 | 5 | 6 |
| Genesis Series | Released: November 6, 2015; Label: Mind of a Genius, Columbia; Formats: Digital download | 11 | — | — |
| Stardustexhalemarrakechdreams | Released: August 18, 2017; Label: Mind of a Genius; Formats: Digital download | — | 10 | — |
| Ringos Desert Pt. 1 | Released: April 26, 2018; Label: Mind of a Genius; Formats: Digital download | 19 | 23 | — |
| Musical Chairs Mixtape (Vol. 1) | Released: July 29, 2022; Label: Astralwerks; Formats: Digital download, streaming | — | — | — |
| Days Before Grace | Released: September 8, 2023; Label: Astralwerks; Formats: Digital download, streaming | — | — | — |
"—" denotes an extended play that did not chart or was not released.

=== Singles ===
==== As lead artist ====
| Year | Title | Peak chart positions | | | | | | | Certifications | Album |
| Year | Title | US Dance | AUS | BEL (FL) | DEN | IRE | NL | UK | Certifications | Album |
|---|---|---|---|---|---|---|---|---|---|---|
| 2014 | "Faded" | 12 | 3 | 7 | 2 | 39 | 69 | 3 | BPI: Platinum | The Nightday |
| 2015 | "Automatic" (with AlunaGeorge) | 19 | 97 | 59 | — | — | — | — | | Genesis Series |
| 2015 | "Working for It" (with Skrillex and THEY.) | 11 | 30 | — | — | — | — | 71 | | Genesis Series |
| 2016 | "Generationwhy" | 26 | — | — | — | — | — | — | | Generationwhy |
| 2016 | "Hometown Girl" | 40 | — | — | — | — | — | — | | Generationwhy |
| 2017 | "Nightcrawler" | — | — | — | — | — | — | — | | Non-album singles |
| 2017 | "Intoxicate" | — | — | — | — | — | — | — | | Non-album singles |
| 2017 | "Dreams" (with Nero) | 36 | — | — | — | — | — | — | | Stardustexhalemarrakechdreams |
| 2018 | "Blame" (with Ekali) | — | — | — | — | — | — | — | | Non-album single |
| 2018 | "My Life" (with Tame Impala) | 20 | — | — | — | — | — | — | | Ringos Desert |
| 2018 | "Coming Home" (featuring Majid Jordan) | — | — | — | — | — | — | — | | Ringos Desert |
| 2019 | "Mi Rumba" (with Sofi Tukker) | — | — | — | — | — | — | — | | Non-album singles |
| 2019 | "Man's First Inhibition" (with Nghtmre) | — | — | — | — | — | — | — | | Non-album singles |
| 2019 | "Zoning" (with the Bloody Beetroots) | — | — | — | — | — | — | — | | Non-album singles |
| 2019 | "Came for the Low" (with PartywithRay) | 22 | — | — | — | — | — | — | | Non-album singles |
| 2020 | "Only" (with Tinashe) | 25 | — | — | — | — | — | — | | Dreamland 2021 |
| 2020 | "Desire" (with Bob Moses) | 40 | — | — | — | — | — | — | | Desire |
| 2020 | "Follow" (with Kito and Jeremih) | 20 | — | — | — | — | — | — | | Non-album singles |
| 2020 | "Risky Business" | 37 | — | — | — | — | — | — | | Non-album singles |
| 2020 | "I Admit It" (featuring 24kGoldn) | 23 | — | — | — | — | — | — | | Non-album singles |
| 2021 | "Sky Is Crying" (featuring Yuna) | 39 | — | — | — | — | — | — | | Dreamland 2021 |
| 2021 | "Yours" (with Arctic Lake) | 16 | — | — | — | — | — | — | | Dreamland 2021 |
| 2021 | "Monster" (featuring John the Blind) | — | — | — | — | — | — | — | | Non-album single |
| 2021 | "Z-Train" | — | — | — | — | — | — | — | | Dreamland (Deluxe) |
| 2021 | "Lil Mama" (with Partywithray) | — | — | — | — | — | — | — | | #Partystarters |
| 2021 | "I'm Into It" (with Paul Oakenfold and Velvet Cash) | — | — | — | — | — | — | — | | Shine On |
| 2023 | "Revelations" (with Devault and BabyJake) | — | — | — | — | — | — | — | | Days Before Grace |
| 2023 | "Changes" | — | — | — | — | — | — | — | | Days Before Grace |
| 2024 | "Settle for Less" (with Sabrina Claudio) | 40 | — | — | — | — | — | — | | Grace |
"—" denotes a recording that did not chart or was not released.

==== As featured artist ====
List of singles released as featured artist
| Title | Year | Album |
|---|---|---|
| "Radar" (Cassie Cardelle featuring Zhu) | 2013 | Non-album single |
| "My Blood" (AlunaGeorge featuring Zhu) | 2016 | I Remember |
| "No More" (DJ Snake featuring Zhu) | 2019 | Carte Blanche |
| "All On Me" (Tchami featuring Zhu) | 2020 | Year Zero |

== Awards and nominations ==
=== Grammy Awards ===
| Year | Award | Nominee / work | Result | Ref. |
|---|---|---|---|---|
| 2015 | Best Dance Recording | "Faded" | Nominated | |
