= The Heart Part 6 =

2024 diss track by Drake

Song by Drake
- Released: May 5, 2024
- Recorded: May 2024
- Genre: Hip hop
- Length: 5:25
- Label: OVO
- Songwriters: Aubrey Graham; Matthew Samuels; Randy Evretts
- Producer: Boi-1da

Audio
- "The Heart Part 6" on YouTube

"The Heart Part 6" is a diss track by the Canadian rapper Drake released amidst his highly publicized feud with the American rapper Kendrick Lamar. It was released through Drake's OVO Sound record label on May 5, 2024, as a response to Lamar's "Meet the Grahams" and "Not Like Us".

"The Heart Part 6" was produced by Boi-1da and samples "Prove It" by Aretha Franklin. The title references Lamar's "The Heart" song series; at the time, the latest installment was 2022's "The Heart Part 5". In "The Heart Part 6", Drake denies Lamar's accusations of pedophilia and sexual misconduct, which he claims were based on Lamar's own trauma stemming from abuse. He reiterates his allegations from "Family Matters" that Lamar committed domestic abuse and that his manager Dave Free biologically fathered his son.

"The Heart Part 6" received negative reviews from critics, who considered it a poor response to "Not Like Us" and criticized Drake's lyricism and claims about Lamar as nonsensical and contradictory. In June 2024, Drake deleted an Instagram post promoting it, a move that music journalists interpreted as a white flag admission.

== Background ==
Drake has been "long plagued" by rumors of inappropriate behavior with minors. During his feud with Kendrick Lamar in 2024, Lamar resurfaced these allegations on the diss tracks "Meet the Grahams" and "Not Like Us”, which repeatedly accuse Drake of pedophilia and other misdeeds. Lamar also previously said that he had spies in Drake's label, OVO Sound, on his diss track "6:16 in LA.” The title of said track is also a reference of Drake's "timestamp song series."

== Title and artwork ==
The title of "The Heart Part 6" is a reference to Lamar's "The Heart" song series, which has lasted for over a decade as of 2026, starting in April 2010.

The cover art for the single is a screenshot of a comment by Kendrick Lamar's manager Dave Free under an Instagram post by Lamar's fiancée Whitney Alford. This connects to Drake's allegations on the song that Alford had an affair with Free.

== Content ==
The song samples "Prove It" by Aretha Franklin, specifically the line: "Now let me see you prove it / Just let me see you prove it". Throughout the song, Drake denies the allegations of pedophilia and sexual misconduct levelled against him by Lamar on previous songs, saying "Only fuckin' with Whitneys, not Millie Bobby Browns, I'd never look twice at no teenager." However, Drake has previously been under fire for kissing an underage girl during a concert in 2010, in which he asks how old she is, which she responds 17, he then comments on her body saying "I can't go to jail yet man! Why do you look like that?"

He also alleges that Lamar fixates on the topic because of his own supposed molestation as a child, labeling this "trauma from [Lamar's] own confessions". Drake traces this to Lamar's song "Mother I Sober" off of his 2022 album Mr. Morale & The Big Steppers, referring to the song as "that one record where you say you got molested". However, the referenced song is actually about generational trauma and Lamar's mother not believing him when he truthfully told her he had not been molested.

Drake also denies the allegations that he has a hidden daughter, claiming to have "fed" Lamar false information through double agents. He also goes on the attack against Lamar, attacking his relationship with his fiancée Whitney Alford. Drake claims that the relationship between Lamar and Alford has grown distant, accuses Lamar of committing physical domestic abuse against Alford, and suggests that Alford was impregnated by Lamar's manager Dave Free. He cites social media posts such as the one featured in the single artwork that he says support his claims.

Towards the end of "The Heart Part 6", Drake expresses his desire to withdraw from the feud in light of Lamar's supposed childhood trauma, saying "I don't wanna diss you anymore, this really got me second-guessing". He sarcastically wishes Lamar well in recovering from his alleged traumatic experiences. The song concludes with a spoken word outro in which Drake says it was enjoyable to "get the pen working" during the feud, which he calls "good exercise".

== Reception ==
"The Heart Part 6" was negatively received by critics. Candace McDuffie of The Root called the song a "cringy response" in which Drake's lyrics come off as a confession to Lamar's pedophilia accusations, and found his disses towards Lamar contradictory and nonsensical. Fellow rapper Rick Ross also slammed the song, saying of its lyrical content, "You know ain't nobody playing a song about pedophilia and defending pedophilia in the club". Ross singled out one line in particular, "If I was fucking young girls, I promise I'd have been arrested / I'm way too famous for this shit you just suggested" as especially poorly executed. Referencing rumors of Drake using ghostwriters and mocking Drake's biracial identity, he remarked, "Whoever wrote that for you should have put more thought into that… White boy, it's your writers. Whatever message you translated to them, that wasn't the way they was supposed to do that". In June 2024, Drake deleted an Instagram post promoting the song from his feed, a move that was interpreted in the media as a white flag admission.

Drake's OVO clothing retailer on London's Carnaby Street was vandalized on May 7, 2024, by an unknown graffiti artist, who plastered the phrase "They not like us" in silver lettering on its window. The London Metropolitan Police Service have not announced plans to investigate the store tagging and no arrests have been made. In the following days, two separate individuals were apprehended by the Toronto Police while attempting to break into Drake's Bridle Path home; the same residence shown on the cover art for Kendrick Lamar's "Not Like Us".
