= 7 Minute Drill =

Song by J. Cole

from the album Might Delete Later
- Released: April 5, 2024
- Recorded: 2024
- Genre: Hip-hop; trap
- Length: 3:32
- Label: Dreamville; Interscope
- Songwriters: Jermaine Cole; Tyler Williams; Denzel Williams; Hug Alessandro; Elias Sticken
- Producers: T-Minus; Conductor Williams; Al Hug; Elyas

"7 Minute Drill" was a diss track written and recorded by the American rapper J. Cole for his fourth mixtape, Might Delete Later (2024). It was his response to fellow American rapper Kendrick Lamar's diss verse on his single "Like That" (with American rapper Future and producer Metro Boomin). Produced by T-Minus, Conductor Williams, Al Hug and Elyas, the track was titled after and taken from one of Cole's seven-minute songwriting drills with the former producer.

Two days after the song was released, Cole retracted his diss and issued a public apology to Lamar. He sought to stay out of the Drake–Kendrick Lamar feud that was rapidly emerging more than a decade after it began. Five days later, Cole pulled the song from music streaming services.

"7 Minute Drill" debuted at number six on the Billboard Hot 100, but immediately following its removal from streaming platforms it fell off the chart. Critics were polarized by "7 Minute Drill", as they felt that it was a restrained and subpar response to Lamar's verse. Cole bowing out further divided critics; some were disappointed and believed that it left a stain on his reputation, while others commended him for prioritizing his mental health over competition. After the subsequent releases of "Meet the Grahams" and "Not Like Us", Lamar's last two diss tracks aimed at Drake, he received further commendation from critics for bowing out gracefully due to the harsh nature of the released tracks.

== Background and composition ==
J. Cole was featured on Drake's single "First Person Shooter", released on October 6, 2023, from the latter's eighth studio album, For All the Dogs. During his verse, Cole supported the idea that he, Drake, and Kendrick Lamar make up the "Big Three" of modern rap music. Six months later, Lamar responded to "First Person Shooter" through a surprise appearance on Future and Metro Boomin's single "Like That", from their collaborative album We Don't Trust You (2024), where he dismissed Cole's "Big Three" remark and claimed that he alone rules the rap scene. Although the majority of his diss verse was aimed at Drake, it also featured a few "warning jabs" aimed at Cole.

T-Minus, who produced "7 Minute Drill" alongside Conductor Williams, told Complex that Cole enjoys doing songwriting drills, consisting of him "writ[ing] a joint for seven minutes and see[ing] how far he can get". The method, according to his manager Ibrahim Hamad, is his way of "breaking out of overthinking". After "Like That" was released, Cole and T-Minus met at a recording studio to work on a writing drill. The latter artist kicked off the challenge by producing a beat via FL Studio within the seven-minute timeframe. Before Cole headed to a separate room to complete his portion of the drill, he asked T-Minus to give him a word to start with. He suggested "light" after noticing the word on his workstation. When his seven minutes were up, Cole left the room and told T-Minus, "just give me another seven minutes. I think I've got something going", ultimately resulting in "7 Minute Drill". Rolling Stone thought that the title was a reference to military exercises where officials discuss how to respond to an enemy threat.

== Lyrics ==
"7 Minute Drill" is Cole's "lyrical exercise" in response to Lamar's verse on "Like That". He begins by comparing Lamar's career trajectory to The Simpsons (1989–present); despite being the longest-running American animated series in history, critics and audiences have noticed a "waning quality" with its recent seasons. Cole elaborates on the comparison by evaluating Lamar's discography:

Your first shit [2012's Good Kid, M.A.A.D City] was classic, your last shit [2022's Mr. Morale & the Big Steppers] was tragic / Your second shit [2015's To Pimp a Butterfly] put niggas to sleep, but they gassed it / Your third shit [2017's Damn] was massive and that was your prime / I was trailin' right behind and I just now hit mine

Even though Lamar's debut studio album is Section.80 (2011), publications interpreted that the dig began with Good Kid, M.A.A.D City as it is his first album under a major record label. Cole continues the verse by throwing backhanded compliments and "light" jabs at his "brother" instead of hard insults, alluding his conflicted feelings to Nino Brown killing Gerald "Gee Money" Wells in the crime film New Jack City (1991). Complex's Jordan Rose, in his breakdown of "7 Minute Drill", suggests that he "doesn’t want to fully commit to dissing [Lamar] because they’ve been cordial up until this point".

The second half of the song takes aim at Lamar's small stature ("Your arms might be too short to box with the God") and sparse release schedule ("He averagin' one hard verse like every thirty months or somethin' [...] Four albums in 12 years, nigga, I can divide"). The latter lines are direct parallels to Jay-Z's 2001 song "Takeover", a diss track aimed at Nas and Prodigy of Mobb Deep. Cole closes the song by saying, "This is merely a warning shot to back niggas down", which Rose took as him "indulging in this lyrical warfare simply because he loves the sport of rap competition, rather than because he has any real malice in his heart for his opponent."

== Critical reception ==
"7 Minute Drill" polarized music critics, most of whom considered the song to be a weak response to "Like That". They also found it ironic that Cole claimed Lamar's work put listeners to sleep, considering his own discography was also criticized and turned into Internet memes for its alleged "sleepy" nature.

Andre Gee of Rolling Stone wrote that "if '7 Minute Drill' is in fact a reference to military deliberation, maybe the command decision should've been to stand down and not say anything at all." He acknowledged Cole taking a sensible and measured approach to competition, but argued that rap beefs are a "toxic, nonsensical arena" and its fans want artists to "take it all the way there, not be overly conscientious and almost deferential on the battlefield". Writing for Billboard, Angel Diaz felt that the song alluding to New Jack City was accurate as Cole sounded restrained. He believed he fired a "shot in the air" instead of a "headshot like most expected", ultimately deeming his retort was not enough.

Pitchfork's Alphonse Pierre found "7 Minute Drill" to be an "even more boring" addition to an "already boring" feud, with heavy criticisms towards Cole's "worn" delivery, camp counselor-esque disses and cheap production. He concludes that the song "feels less like a diss track and more like the sad, conflicted texts you send after a breakup, when you still have a little hope that, one day, eventually, you will be back together like none of this ever happened." In a more positive review, Clash's Robin Murray felt the production was "slightly out-of-step" with Might Delete Later, but "it taps into some of the project’s over-arching themes—self-worth, separating talent from hype—and feels more ingrained, really, than [Lamar]’s own bars on the hit ‘n’ miss Metro Boomin and Future tape."

== Aftermath ==
=== Apology ===
On April 7, 2024, two days after "7 Minute Drill" was released, Cole headlined his annual Dreamville Festival in his native North Carolina. He addressed the crowd towards the end of his performance in a six-minute speech, where he stressed the importance of the forthcoming song "Love Yourz" and reflected on Might Delete Later. Cole was "so proud" of the mixtape, as it served as a lead-up to his upcoming studio album The Fall Off, but there was one part that he felt was "the lamest shit I did in my fucking life". He admitted he was "conflicted" about "7 Minute Drill" for two reasons: the respect he has for Lamar and Drake, and the general public wanting bloodshed. Neither motive "sat right" with Cole's spirit and "disrupted his peace".

Cole further confessed that he tried looking for an angle to justify downplaying Lamar's catalog and his "greatness". He asked the audience if they thought Lamar is "one of the greatest motherfuckers to ever touch a fucking microphone" and "love him like he does", resulting in cheers from the crowd. Cole then formally apologized to Lamar for "moving incorrectly" and prayed that he "didn't feel no way" and that "God will line him back up on his purpose and on his path". He gave Lamar permission to diss him back if he was offended by the song and hoped that the audience forgave him for the "misstep".

In May 2024, it was reported that Schoolboy Q, a member of Black Hippy and close collaborator with Lamar, was at the Dreamville Festival and had a conversation with Cole, possibly giving him a heads up about the animosity between Drake and Lamar.

=== Removal ===
After apologizing to Lamar, Cole vowed to remove "7 Minute Drill" from music streaming services. Five days later, he upheld his commitment and pulled the song from streaming services such as Spotify, Apple Music, and Tidal. Technically, this was done by disabling the track from playback or being hidden; Deezer once disabled the track from playing back but now substitutes it within the parent album's entries (both regular and censored versions) with an unofficial remix. Luminate was able to track its opening week commercial performance despite the removal, allowing the song to debut at number six on the Billboard Hot 100 for the chart dated April 20, 2024; it is Cole's thirteenth top-10 hit. "7 Minute Drill" fell off the chart entirely the following week as a result of it being removed from streaming. It broke the record for the steepest drop off the Hot 100 one week after debuting, surpassing Soko's viral single "We Might Be Dead by Tomorrow" which fell off the chart from its number nine debut.

=== Commentary ===
Cole's apology sparked divided conversations amongst journalists and other rappers centered around hip hop's competitive spirit, Black masculinity, and men's mental health. Sowmya Krishnamurthy was disappointed with the apology and described it as a "let down" for the genre in an opinion piece for Business Insider.

With the escalating nature of the feud between Lamar and Drake, following the release of "Family Matters" and "Meet the Grahams", many media commentators noted that Cole was wise to bow out of the feud.

== Personnel ==
Musicians

- Jermaine Cole – lead artist, vocals, songwriter, composer
- Tyler Williams – production, composer
- Denzel "Conductor" Williams – production, composer
- Hug "Al Hug" Alessandro – production
- Elias "Elyas" Sticken – production

Technical

- Joe LaPorta – mastering
- Mez – mixing
- Kuldeep Chudasama – recording

== Charts ==
Chart performance for "7 Minute Drill"
Chart (2024)	Peak position
Australia (ARIA)	42
Australia Hip Hop/R&B (ARIA)	6
Canada Hot 100 (Billboard)	17
Global 200 (Billboard)	14
Greece International (IFPI)	35
Ireland (IRMA)	44
New Zealand (Recorded Music NZ)	26
South Africa (TOSAC)	3
UK Singles (Official Charts)	38
UK Hip Hop/R&B (Official Charts)	9
US Billboard Hot 100	6
US Hot R&B/Hip-Hop Songs (Billboard)	2
