= Watch the Party Die =

2024 song by Kendrick Lamar

"Untitled"

Song by Kendrick Lamar
- Released: September 11, 2024
- Recorded: 2024
- Length: 5:07
- Songwriter: Kendrick Lamar Duckworth
- Producers: Jack Antonoff; Sounwave; Irvin "Pasqué" Mejia; Anca Trio Plus One

On September 11, 2024, the American rapper Kendrick Lamar released an untitled song exclusively to his Instagram account. Following its surprise release, media outlets referred to the untitled song as "Watch the Party Die" after its chorus.

The song was released 3 days after the announcement that Lamar would be headlining the Super Bowl LIX halftime show. Following Lamar's feud with Drake, "Watch the Party Die" concerns Lamar's frustrations with the music industry; specific critiques were aimed towards hip hop culture and media.

== Background ==
American rapper Kendrick Lamar announced that he would be headlining the Super Bowl LIX halftime show on September 8, 2024. Despite the news being well received by critics, it polarized the rap industry as some believed Lil Wayne should have been the headliner due to the event being held in his hometown of New Orleans.

Lamar released an untitled song with no prior announcement to his Instagram account on September 11 at approximately 8 p.m. ET; the same time the 2024 MTV Video Music Awards (VMAs) commenced. The song's cover art is taken from an eBay listing for a pair of black Nike Air Force 1s, which were purchased shortly after the song's release.

== Composition ==
"Watch the Party Die" was the first song to be released by Lamar following the number one single "Not Like Us" and his highly publicized feud with Canadian rapper Drake. Though it references Drake and the feud, critics noted the song was not another diss track. Instead, the lyrics critique materialism, influencers and celebrity culture; the song's release during the VMAs was perceived as being a direct reaction to it. Lamar expresses his frustrations with the music industry as a whole, particularly focusing on the hip hop industry.

The track, like previous standalone Lamar single "The Heart Part 5", pays tribute to rapper Nipsey Hussle following his death in 2019. It also references Christian rappers Dee-1 and Lecrae. Both artists responded positively — initially through posts on X, and later through response tracks. The song is primarily Lamar rapping over a mid-tempo instrumental, which consists of piano, violin, and a gentle vocal melody.
