= Champagne Moments =

2024 diss track by Rick Ross

Single by Rick Ross
- Released: April 13, 2024
- Recorded: April 2024
- Genre: Hip hop
- Length: 3:25
- Label: Maybach; Gamma
- Songwriter: William Leonard Roberts II
- Producers: Mini Boom & Trop

Rick Ross singles chronology
"Lyrical Eazy" (2023)	"Champagne Moments" (2024)

Alternative cover
- updated cover art

Music video
- "Champagne Moments" on YouTube

"Champagne Moments" is a diss track by American rapper Rick Ross aimed at Canadian rapper Drake. It is a response to "Push Ups", hours after the song was leaked. Champagne Moments was released on April 13, 2024 and was released on to streaming platforms 2 days later. It samples the 1975 song "Je Ne Suis Que De L'Amour" by Paul Mauriat, a clip of Drake performing at a concert saying Rick Ross is his "favourite rapper to rap with on any song", and rapper Cuban Link's Spanish rap song "Nos Tienen Miedo 2", which is a posse cut featuring several underground rappers of Latin descent.

== Music video ==
The video takes place in an airplane hangar with Ross sitting on a stool while smoking marijuana, behind him is a Chevy Bel-Air and next to him is bottles of alcohol, specifically Luc Belaire Rare Rosé and Bumbu Rum, which Ross endorses and below it is a poster promoting the 3rd Annual Rick Ross Car & Bike Show.

== Cover art ==
The original cover art depicted a Caucasian person who resembles Drake. The origins of the cover art went way back to 2014 when a Twitter user showed the original photo while saying "please take a moment to enjoy: white guy who looks like drake." On June 9, 2024 the cover art was changed to an AI-generated caricature of a blonde haired Drake with glasses wearing a suit.

== Aftermath ==
Drake would later respond with his diss track "Family Matters" on May 3, 2024 and The Game would later take shots at Rick Ross with his diss track "Freeway's Revenge" on May 10, 2024.

== See also ==
- Drake–Kendrick Lamar feud
- Push Ups (song)
- Family Matters (Drake song)
