= Drake–Kendrick Lamar feud =

Ongoing hip-hop feud since 2013

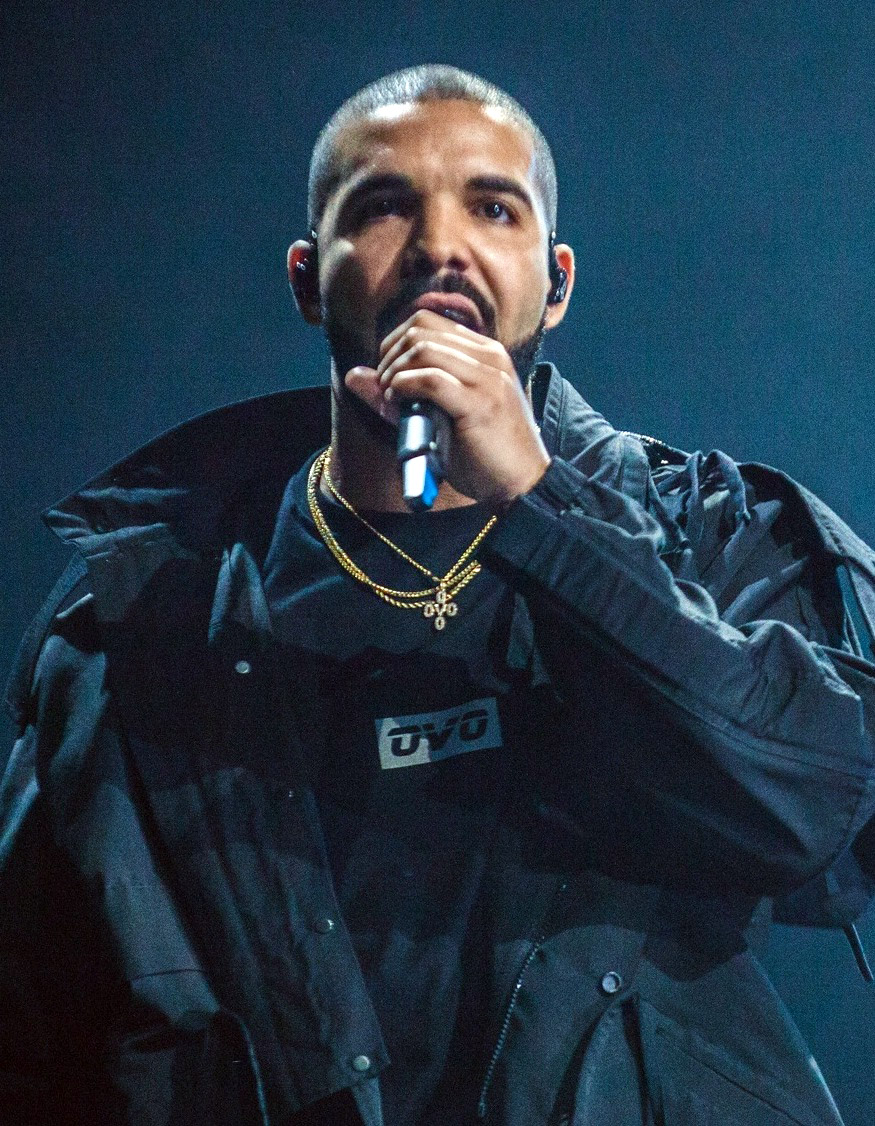
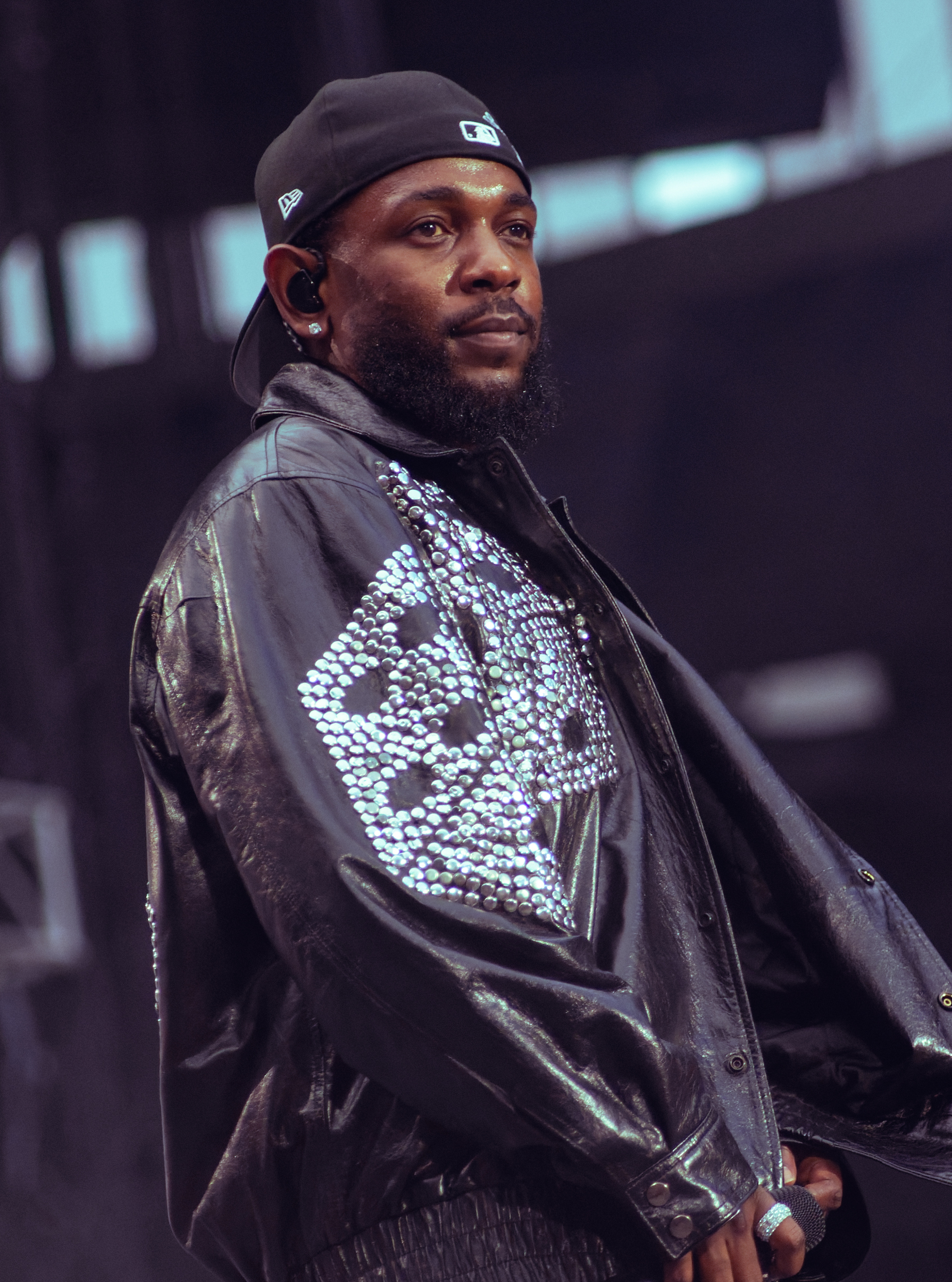
- Drake in 2016 Kendrick Lamar in 2025
- Date: September 23, 2013 (Note: The two rappers have disputes leading back to 2013, but the current feud started in 2023.) – present (13 years, 1 month, 2 weeks and 5 days); 2024 escalation: March 22 – July 4, 2024 (Note: Publications referring to the "Not Like Us" music video as a victory lap for Lamar include Pitchfork, Variety, Vulture, GQ, People, and The Hollywood Reporter.) (104 days)
- Medium: Diss tracks
- Status: Ongoing; 2024 escalation: Lamar victory; (Note: According to Pitchfork, Variety, Vulture, GQ, People, Vibe, The Hollywood Reporter, and New Yorker.) see verdict

Parties
Drake; J. Cole (until April 7, 2024)	Kendrick Lamar; Metro Boomin; Future (until May 15, 2026)

Works
"Push Ups"; "Taylor Made Freestyle"; "Family Matters"; "The Heart Part 6"	"Like That"; "Euphoria"; "6:16 in LA"; "Meet the Grahams"; "Not Like Us"

The Canadian rapper Drake and the American rapper Kendrick Lamar have been involved in a highly publicized rivalry since 2013, when Drake responded to Lamar's verse on the Big Sean song "Control". In 2024, their feud escalated to a series of diss and answer tracks following the release of "Like That" by Lamar, Future and Metro Boomin, in which Lamar insults Drake. The feud has been the subject of extensive media coverage, and music journalists consider it one of the largest in hip-hop history.

Drake and Lamar have been among hip-hop's most prominent figures since the 2010s. Their relationship began on favorable terms, but turned acrimonious after Lamar named Drake among rappers he sought to compete with on "Control". Over the next decade, the two sent sneak disses across various songs. After the American rapper J. Cole named himself, Lamar, and Drake the "big three" of modern hip-hop on Drake's song "First Person Shooter" in October 2023, Lamar insulted them on "Like That" in March 2024. In April, Cole responded with "7 Minute Drill", but quickly apologized and removed it from streaming services. Drake responded with the diss tracks "Push Ups" and "Taylor Made Freestyle", prompting Lamar to respond with "Euphoria". The feud grew to involve other hip-hop artists known for their animosity towards Drake, including ASAP Rocky, Rick Ross, the Weeknd, and Kanye West.

On May 3, the feud escalated with Drake's "Family Matters", in which he accuses Lamar of domestic abuse and claims that Lamar's creative partner Dave Free is the biological father of his son. Twenty minutes later, Lamar released "Meet the Grahams", in which he accuses Drake of sexual predation, running a sex trafficking ring, and—building on claims from the American rapper Pusha T's diss track "The Story of Adidon" (2018)—having fathered a secret child. The next day, Lamar released "Not Like Us", in which he accuses Drake of pedophilia and exploiting Atlanta's hip-hop culture. On May 5, Drake released "The Heart Part 6", in which he denies Lamar's allegations and reiterates his; Lamar did not respond. Lamar and Drake reflected on the feud in releases including Lamar's "Watch the Party Die" and GNX (2024) and Drake's "Gimme a Hug" (2025) and Iceman (2026).

Commentators have praised the feud for its spectacle and for maintaining hip-hop's cultural relevance, though some criticized Drake and Lamar for how they made and responded to allegations. Lamar was widely viewed as the victor following the release of "Not Like Us"; in February 2025, he won five Grammy Awards for "Not Like Us", and performed it and "Euphoria" during the Super Bowl LIX halftime show. In January, Drake filed a lawsuit against Universal Music Group, the label to which he and Lamar are signed, in a New York federal court, alleging that "Not Like Us" defamed him. It was dismissed in October.

== Background ==
Rivalries between rappers, including the Roxanne Wars, the East Coast–West Coast feud, the Jay-Z–Nas feud, and the 50 Cent–Ja Rule feud, have been a major aspect of hip-hop culture since the genre's inception. Some feuds have involved the participants exchanging diss and answer tracks, while others have involved exchanging insults in interviews and over social media. Some have escalated to violence; the East Coast–West Coast feud culminated in the murders of Tupac Shakur in 1996 and of the Notorious B.I.G. in 1997. In 2025, Janeé Bolden of Rolling Stone observed that feuds have "always walked a fine line between competition and chaos".

=== Drake and Lamar ===
Since the 2010s, the Canadian rapper Drake and the American rapper Kendrick Lamar have been regarded as two of hip-hop's most prominent figures. Their relationship began on favorable terms, with the collaboration "Buried Alive Interlude", a two-minute track performed by Lamar on Drake's 2011 studio album Take Care. Lamar raps about how meeting Drake felt like an introduction into the tempting, but potentially harmful world of celebrity, luxury, and fame. Lamar expresses complex feelings about fame—both desiring and fearing what it might bring into his life, especially after witnessing Drake's life of luxury—and shares his impatience when finding out that he was the same age as Drake. This fraught relationship with fame became a recurring theme in Lamar's music and often stood in contrast with Drake's celebration of luxury. GQ described "Buried Alive Interlude" as foreshadowing themes that would lead to Drake and Lamar's feud.

Lamar complimented Drake after their initial meeting and collaboration, describing him as "a real good dude [with] a real genuine soul". He said that Drake had been the first to hear his debut album, Section.80 (2011). Their relationship continued to develop amicably. "Buried Alive Interlude" received positive reviews, and Lamar (alongside ASAP Rocky) opened for Drake's Club Paradise Tour in early 2012. Around that time, Lamar signed to a major label, Interscope Records. In October 2012, Lamar and Drake appeared on ASAP Rocky's single "Fuckin' Problems", and Lamar released his first major-label album, Good Kid, M.A.A.D City. Drake made a guest appearance on the track "Poetic Justice", which became a successful single, though it would be his last collaboration with Lamar.

=== Other feuds involving Drake ===
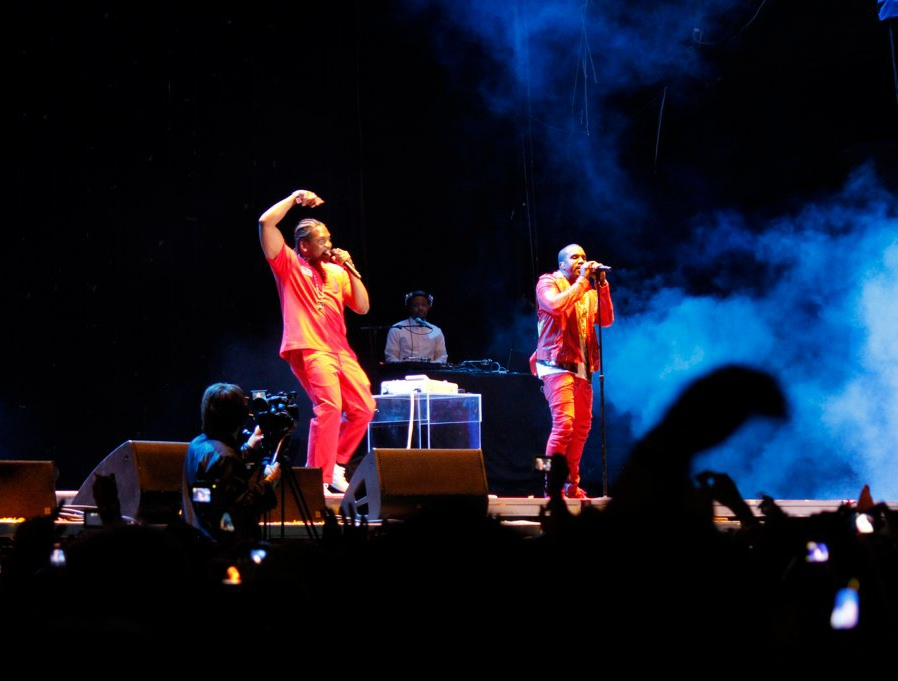
Pusha T (left) and Kanye West (right) performing in 2011. Drake's rivalry with them led to Pusha T's "The Story of Adidon" in 2018, which foreshadowed themes in Lamar's feud with Drake in 2024.

In June 2015, the American rapper Meek Mill accused Drake of not writing his raps as he had always claimed, but instead having them ghostwritten by his creative partner Quentin Miller. Doreen St. Félix wrote for The New Yorker in 2018 that Drake's success "hinged on outfoxing artists who are stubbornly attached to rap's dated notions of [cultural] authenticity", and that his "complicated virtue out of riding genres and trends [made] him oddly impervious to attempts to puncture his credibility". Drake responded to Meek Mill with what St. Félix described as "a juvenile but charismatic two-song barrage", the diss tracks "Charged Up" and "Back to Back". The hip-hop community largely regarded Drake as the victor over Meek Mill.

As a member of the YMCMB entourage, Drake became involved in a rivalry with the American rapper Kanye West's GOOD Music crew, which included artists such as Big Sean, Kid Cudi, and Pusha T. In May 2018, Pusha T released the West-produced album Daytona. On the track "Infrared", Pusha T likens Drake using Miller as a ghostwriter to Donald Trump winning the 2016 presidential election with Russian assistance. St. Félix wrote that Drake's responses ("Duppy Freestyle" and "I'm Upset") kept him in good standing with audiences concerned about authenticity, one reason being that on "Duppy Freestyle", he rebutted the ghostwriting claims by noting that he helped write West's lyrics on "30 Hours" (2016).

Pusha T responded with "The Story of Adidon", which St. Félix wrote severely undermined Drake's credibility; Pitchfork's Sheldon Pearce described it as character assassination. Pusha T raps that Drake, who is biracial, is insecure about his race, and used a previously obscure photo of Drake smiling while wearing blackface, evoking a minstrel show performer, as the cover. He revealed that Drake was hiding a son, Adonis, from the public, and accused him of being a deadbeat parent. Drake released a statement explaining that the photo was intended as a satire on Black stereotyping and typecasting; later in 2018, he confirmed his fatherhood and said he would publicly raise Adonis. He never released a response track and, in 2019, conceded that he lost to Pusha T. While Drake continued to find success in hip-hop, Char Adams of NBC News wrote that Pusha T put "[his] cultural identity on trial". Pusha T's attacks mirrored those Lamar would make in 2024.

=== Past backlash against Drake for alleged misconduct ===
In September 2018, tabloids reported that Drake, then aged 31, went on a dinner date with 18-year-old model Bella Harris; the pair knew each other since the latter was 16 years old. Harris and Drake both denied that they went on this date and that they were ever in a relationship.

Later that year, actress Millie Bobby Brown, then aged 14, revealed in an interview that she had a concurrent online friendship with Drake. This led to accusations from social media users that Drake was grooming Brown. Brown addressed the controversy and defended their friendship in an Instagram post: "Why u gotta make a lovely friendship ur headline? U guys are weird... for real. I'm lucky to have people in the business extend their time to help me further my career and offer their wisdom and guidance." Drake belittled critics of his friendship with Brown on his 2023 song "Another Late Night".

In January 2019, a 2010 video of Drake interacting with a fan during a performance in Denver resurfaced on social media. During the performance, Drake brought the fan from the crowd onstage, slow-danced with her, kissed her, and put his arms on her breasts. He paused, telling the crowd, then her: "Y'all gonna have me get carried away again. I get in trouble for shit like this! How old are you?" She answered "17", to which Drake replied: "I can't go to jail yet, man! Why do you look like that? You're thick. Look at all this."

== 2013–2014: Early disagreements ==
On August 14, 2013, Big Sean released the track "Control", featuring Lamar and Jay Electronica. It was intended for Big Sean's album Hall of Fame, but was excluded due to sample clearance problems. In his verse, Lamar calls out many popular rappers of his generation, including Drake, and challenges them. Lamar, declaring his greatness, raps: "I got love for you all, but I'm tryna murder you niggas / Tryna make sure your core fans never heard of you niggas". The verse quickly went viral on social media and was the subject of widespread discussion within the hip-hop community. Lamar said that he intended for the verse to encourage competition in hip-hop: "A lot of cats that I named, they're actually good friends of mine... But when you're in that booth, you have to be able to annihilate whoever out there and that keeps the level of hip-hop alive, as far as the culture".

In an interview with Billboard on August 30, Drake dismissed Lamar's verse: "It just sounded like an ambitious thought to me. That's all it was. I know good and well that [Lamar]'s not murdering me, at all, in any platform". In September, Drake joined Elliott Wilson's live interview series #CRWN. When asked about "Control", Drake replied that Lamar's in-person attitude contradicted the sentiments of his verse: "I saw him five days later at the VMAs and it was all love... If it's really 'fuck everybody' then it needs to be 'fuck everybody'. It can't just be halfway". In the same interview, Drake described the impact of the Control verse as, "It was real cool for a couple weeks. If I asked you, for example, how does that verse start?". On September 24, Drake released his third studio album, Nothing Was the Same. Multiple outlets interpreted the first verse on its fifth single, "The Language" as a response to the "Control" verse, with Drake insinuating that Lamar's music was "not that inspiring" despite its popularity and acclaim. Birdman, head of Drake's then-label Cash Money Records, said "The Language" was not about Lamar.

During a freestyle performance at the 2013 BET Hip Hop Awards in October, Lamar rapped: "Nothing's been the same since they dropped 'Control' and tucked a sensitive rapper back in his pajama clothes". In December, Drake appeared on a remix of Future's "Shit", rapping "funny how they dangling the bait but I'm one killing niggas on the hook"; media outlets interpreted this as a diss targeting Lamar. Anthony "Top Dawg" Tiffith and Punch, key figures at Lamar's label Top Dawg Entertainment, disregarded Drake's disses on Twitter. That month, Drake addressed Lamar's BET Hip Hop Awards performance and "The Language" in a cover story for Vibe, mocking the idea of them being "buddy-buddy" and stating he already "stood [his] ground" in response to "Control". Nevertheless, Drake maintained that "The Language" was not a Lamar diss, praised Lamar as a "genius in his own right", and insisted there was "no real issue". In June 2014, Drake posted a video on Instagram of himself rapping to "Cut You Off (To Grow Closer)" from Lamar's 2010 mixtape Overly Dedicated.

In October 2014, Jay Rock released "Pay for It" featuring Lamar. Lamar's verse references "The Language" and includes lyrics that media outlets interpreted as disses: "See my opponent then, cease your existence / Endin' our friendship, baby, I'd rather die alone". Like Drake, Lamar denied rumors of a feud. In an interview with Dazed on November 3, Lamar said: "I got no beef with Drake". On November 4, Lamar appeared on WWPR-FM's The Breakfast Club, where he said: "It wasn't no issue from the jump. I think people talk about beef ... it's just a whole 'nother dynamic. I can't see myself going bar for bar with Drake. We're two different types of artists."

== 2015–2023: Sneak disses ==
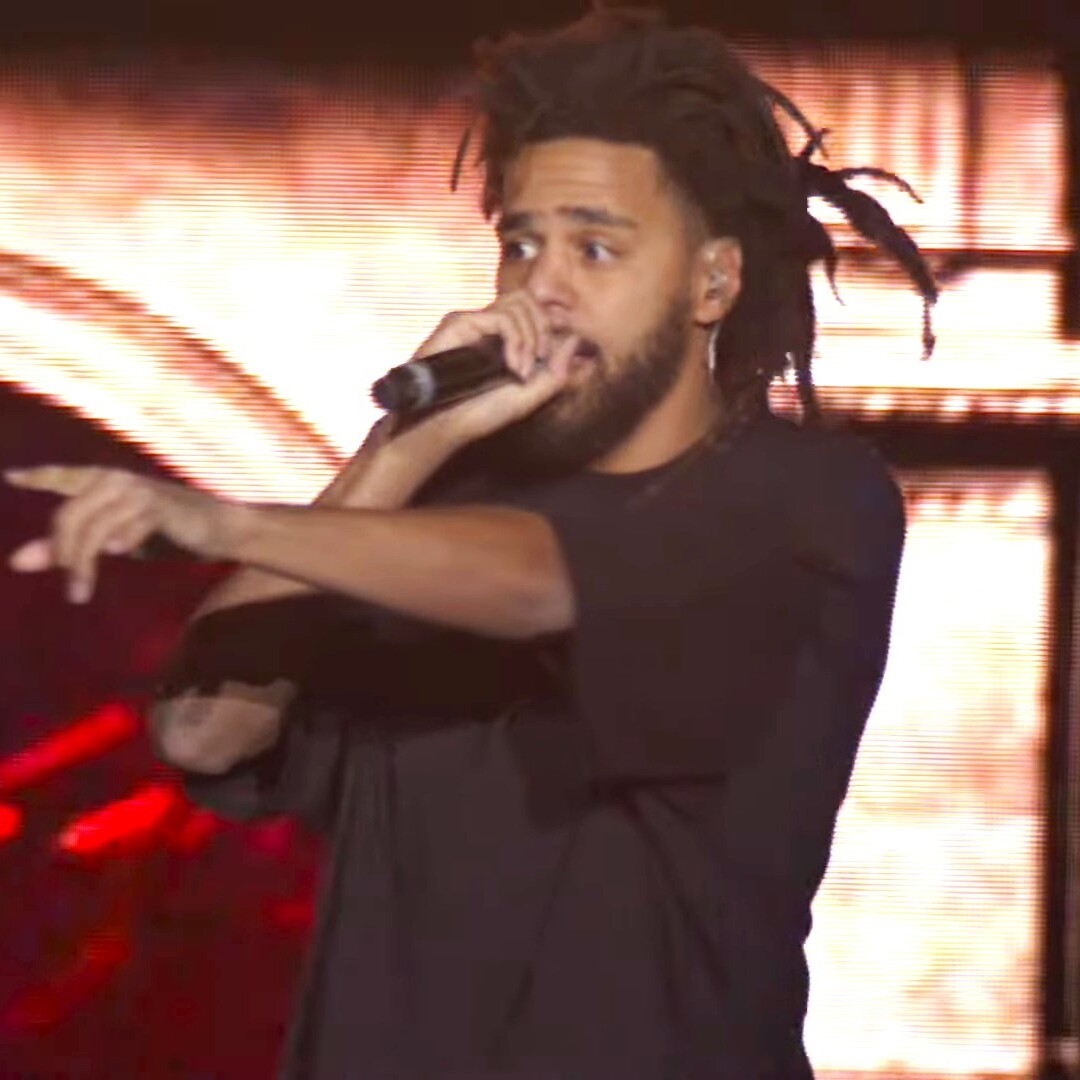
After a decade of sneak disses, J. Cole's (pictured in 2023) guest verse on Drake's song "First Person Shooter" (2023) prompted Lamar to diss him and Drake on "Like That" (2024).

Although Drake and Lamar publicly denied a feud, they continued to send sneak disses (intentionally subtle diss lyrics). Marc Griffin, writing for Vibe, described the period between 2014 and 2023 as "the Cold War between the two men". In February 2015, Drake released the mixtape If You're Reading This It's Too Late. Billboard's Brandon Caldwell identified lyrics in "Used To" as Drake indicating he still took offense to the "Control" verse. In March, Lamar released the album To Pimp a Butterfly. Meek Mill's feud with Drake prompted media outlets to interpret its song "King Kunta", in which Lamar criticizes rappers who use ghostwriters, as a Drake diss. In August, Lamar made guest appearances on Dr. Dre's album Compton and references an unidentified enemy in his verses; media outlets interpreted this as referring to Drake.

In January 2016, US President Barack Obama participated in a series of interviews conducted by YouTube influencers. Adande Thorne asked Obama if he thought Drake or Lamar would win in a rap battle. Obama responded: "Got to go with Kendrick. I think Drake is an outstanding entertainer. But Kendrick—his lyrics, his last album [To Pimp a Butterfly] was outstanding. Best album, I think, last year." Later that month, Drake released "Summer Sixteen", rapping: "Tell Obama that my verses are just like the whips that he in / They bulletproof". Vibe's Iyana Robertson said the ensuing conversation "reignited a debate that has been going on since the conception of [Drake and Lamar's] respective careers".

In June, the ESPN sportscaster Marcellus Wiley said there was an unaired SportsNation interview of either Drake or Lamar insulting the other in a way that would have "ignited [the feud] to proportions we have not seen since Ja Rule [and] 50 [Cent], maybe even Ice Cube [and] N.W.A". In an August interview with VladTV, Wiley stated that the interview was pulled because the inciting rapper's team intervened. In 2024, Wiley elaborated that the incident took place in 2014, with Drake as the inciting party. Wiley recalled that Drake said he was better than Lamar, which he perceived as jealousy. He said that Drake pressured ESPN into pulling the interview by threatening to withdraw as the host of the 2014 ESPY Awards. In March 2017, Lamar released "The Heart Part 4", in which he declares himself "the greatest rapper alive" and attacks an unnamed rival. Media outlets interpreted it as a diss track targeting Big Sean or Drake. (Note: Lamar referenced "The Heart Part 4" in his 2024 Drake diss track "Euphoria", seemingly confirming it was directed at Drake.)

In September 2021, the rapper and podcaster Joe Budden said that Lamar's verse on Baby Keem's song "Family Ties"—released in August and initially interpreted as a diss directed at West—was directed at Drake. In May 2022, Lamar released his fifth studio album Mr. Morale & the Big Steppers. The song "Father Time" (featuring Sampha) includes a verse referencing West and Drake's brief peace during their feud: "When Kanye got back with Drake, I was slightly confused / Guess I'm not mature as I think, got some healin' to do". Some outlets interpreted this as a diss targeting Drake and West, though they also interpreted it as Lamar expressing surprise at the reconciliation.

On October 6, 2023, Drake released his album For All the Dogs. Its single "First Person Shooter" features the American rapper J. Cole, a frequent collaborator of both Drake and Lamar. In his verse, Cole raps that he, Drake, and Lamar are the "big three" of modern hip-hop. Cole recalled that Drake wanted Lamar to appear on "First Person Shooter", but he declined. According to DJ Akademiks, Lamar was annoyed by the request and began writing diss lyrics.

== 2024: Diss and answer tracks ==
=== March–April ===
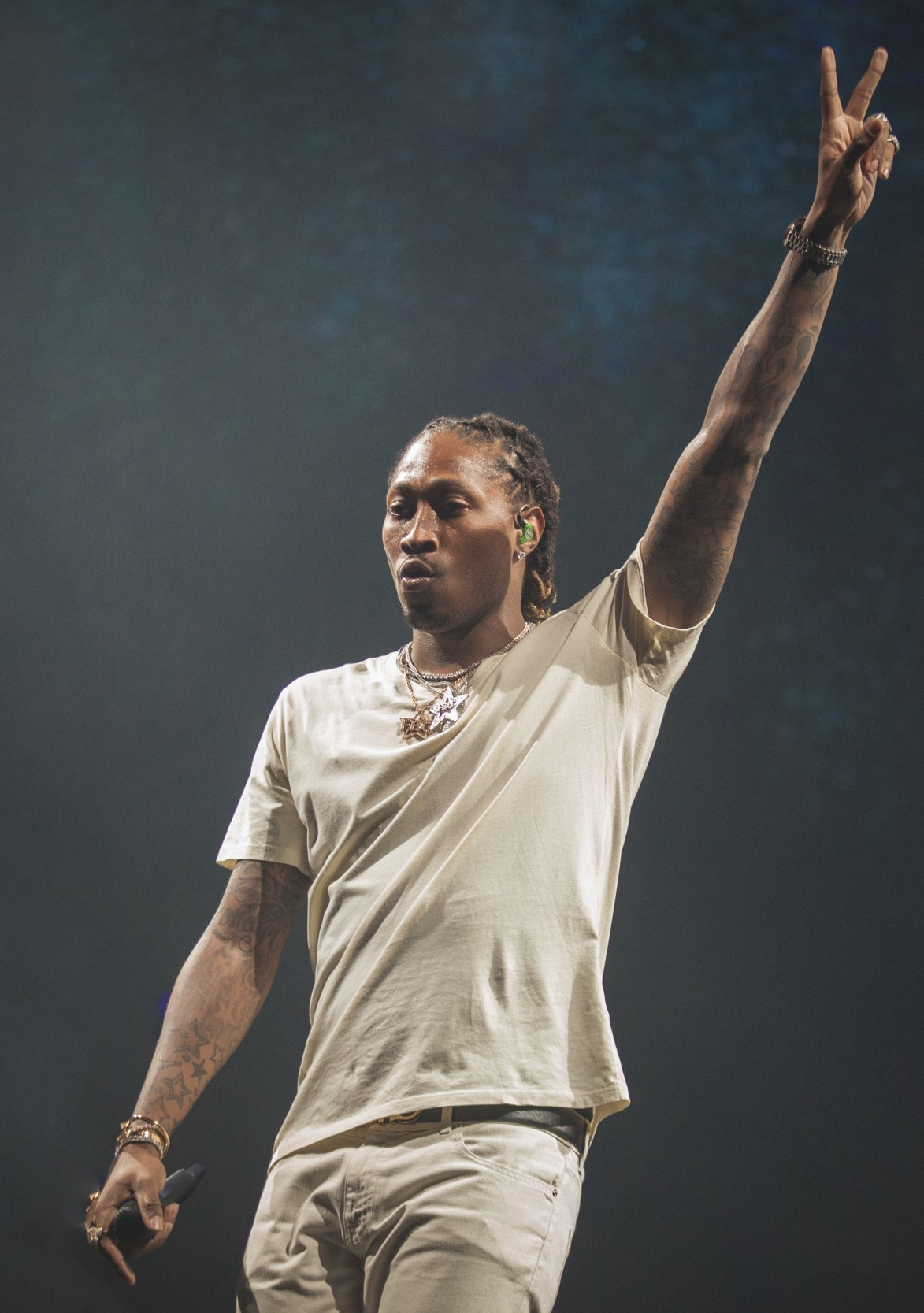
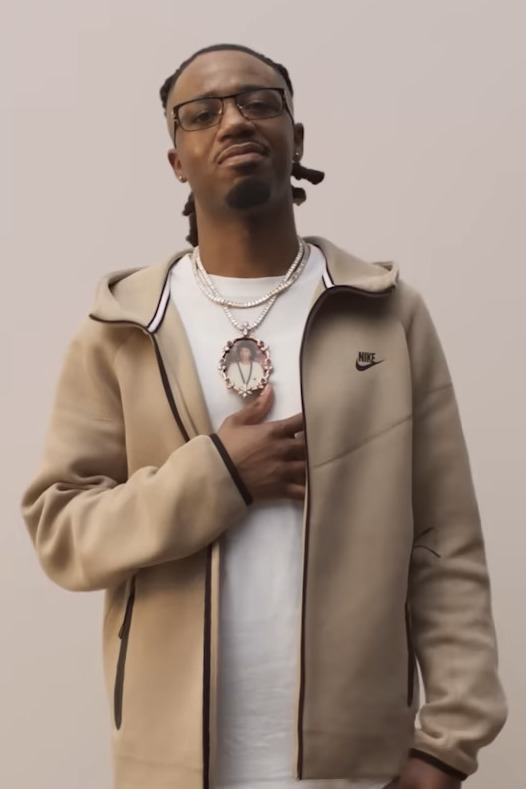
The rapper Future (left) and record producer Metro Boomin (right), formerly frequent collaborators of Drake, played a major role in the feud's 2024 escalation on Lamar's side.

On March 22, 2024, Lamar made a surprise guest appearance on Future and Metro Boomin's song "Like That", from their album We Don't Trust You. In what the BBC described as an "expletive-laden" verse, Lamar mocks Drake and Cole's work as lacking substance, and in response to the "big three" notion, he raps: "motherfuck the big three, nigga, it's just big me". We Don't Trust You was released after Future and Metro Boomin, who previously collaborated with Drake frequently, were reported to have fallen out with him. XXL observed that with the exception of Playboi Carti, all of We Don't Trust You's guest artists were known for their animosity towards Drake, and many of the lyrics and song titles appeared to be insulting him. Drake, who was on his It's All a Blur Tour at the time, did not directly acknowledge "Like That", simply stating: "I got my head up high... and I know no matter what there's not another nigga on this Earth that could ever fuck with me".

On April 5, through his mixtape Might Delete Later, Cole released the response song "7 Minute Drill"; he lightly teases Lamar, suggesting his albums have declined in quality. "7 Minute Drill" received mixed reviews, and two days later, at his Dreamville Festival, Cole apologized for releasing it and removed it from streaming services. The apology bewildered fans and commentators, with Slate calling it "artistic cowardice". In 2026, Cole said that, with "7 Minute Drill", he wanted to "say just enough to where it look[ed] like I said something" without damaging his relationship with Lamar; after releasing it, he felt he had caused division, which was not his intention. According to Billboard, Cole's withdrawal "cleared the way" for a rap battle between Lamar and Drake. On April 12, Metro Boomin and Future released a second collaborative album, We Still Don't Trust You, in which Future and the guest performers ASAP Rocky and the Weeknd direct more insults towards Drake; on April 21, they followed it with a remix of "Like That" featuring ¥$ (West and Ty Dolla Sign) in which West attacks Drake and Cole.

On April 13, "Push Ups", Drake's response to "Like That", leaked online. Drake raps that multiple artists are better than Lamar, including 21 Savage, Travis Scott, and SZA. He mocks Lamar's short stature of 5 ft 5 in (1.65 m), and criticizes Lamar for collaborating with Taylor Swift and other pop artists. Drake also insults Future, Metro Boomin, the Weeknd, ASAP Rocky, and Rick Ross. Ross responded that day with the diss track "Champagne Moments". On April 19, Drake officially released "Push Ups", alongside the Instagram exclusive "Taylor Made Freestyle", which features AI-generated vocals imitating two of Lamar's fellow West Coast rappers, Snoop Dogg and Tupac Shakur, to goad him into responding. Shakur's estate condemned "Taylor Made Freestyle" and threatened legal action against Drake for violating Shakur's personality rights to diss Lamar, a friend of the estate trustees; on April 26, Drake took it down. On April 30, Lamar released the diss track "Euphoria". The title has been interpreted as a reference to the TV drama series Euphoria (2019–2026), on which Drake is an executive producer. Lamar expresses his hatred of Drake, mocking his use of AI on "Taylor Made Freestyle", his parenting abilities, his rapping skills, and reported cosmetic procedures on his abs.

=== May ===
On May 3, Lamar posted an Instagram Reel containing the diss track "6:16 in LA", similar to how Drake released "Taylor Made Freestyle". The title parodies Drake's "[timestamp] in [city]" song series, including "9AM in Dallas" (2010), "5AM in Toronto" (2019), and "8AM in Charlotte" (2023); journalists have speculated that "6:16" is a reference to the date of Father's Day 2024 or a reference to the Devil. "6:16 in LA" was produced by Jack Antonoff, known for his work with Swift; this was interpreted as a response to Drake's comments regarding Swift on "Push Ups" and "Taylor Made Freestyle". Lamar raps that members of Drake's camp are leaking information to him, and threatens to expose Drake's darkest secrets if he does not withdraw from the feud. Later that day, Drake released "Family Matters". Journalists characterized it as a major escalation; Drake alleges that Lamar is a domestic abuser, that he is unfaithful to his fiancée Whitney Alford, and that one of their children was fathered by his creative partner Dave Free. He also attacks Future, Metro Boomin, Ross, ASAP Rocky, the Weeknd, and West. To promote "Family Matters", Drake released a parody remix of "Buried Alive Interlude", in which he mocks Lamar's rapping abilities and suggests he is basing his claims on social media rumors, via Instagram.

20 minutes after the release of "Family Matters", Lamar released "Meet the Grahams", produced by the Alchemist. It is written in the form of a letter, with each verse addressed to members of Drake's family. Lamar alleges that Drake is sexually attracted to minors, is hiding another child (a daughter) from the public, and is running a sex trafficking ring out of his mansion in Toronto. He suggests the employees and affiliates of OVO Sound, Drake's record label, are sex offenders harbored by Drake and his security guard. Charles Holmes of The Ringer wrote that with "Family Matters" and "Meet the Grahams", "the Doomsday Machine [was] activated", and the feud was no longer inconsequential. Lamar's allegation that Drake had a secret daughter added to the previous controversy of his hiding of his son Adonis, which was exposed by Pusha T's "The Story of Adidon", during his feud with Drake in 2018. Drake denied this claim in an Instagram post.

Less than a day later, on May 4, Lamar released "Not Like Us", produced by DJ Mustard. He explicitly accuses Drake and his acquaintances of pedophilia. The cover art is a satellite image of Drake's mansion covered with pins, as if appearing on an online map of sex offenders. Lamar says Drake disrespected the Bay Area, where Shakur had lived, with "Taylor Made Freestyle", and predicts he will be killed if he performs there. He accuses Drake of co-opting Atlanta's hip-hop culture despite having no roots in the city, and labels him a "colonizer" in reference to the historical slave trade ran by European colonists in the American south. Lamar hints that he has many more diss tracks prepared. "Not Like Us" was an immediate commercial success and broke numerous streaming records, most of which were previously held by Drake. It debuted atop the US Billboard Hot 100, the first rap song to do so with a shortened tracking week of five days.

On May 5, Drake released "The Heart Part 6". The title references Lamar's "The Heart" song series; at the time, the most recent installment was "The Heart Part 5". "The Heart Part 6" samples Aretha Franklin's "Prove It" (1967), as Drake denies Lamar's allegations of pedophilia. In doing so, Drake references the allegations that he had been grooming Millie Bobby Brown: "[I'm] only fuckin' with Whitneys, not Millie Bobby Browns, I'd never look twice at no teenager". Drake claims Lamar's allegations were based on TikTok conspiracy theories, Lamar's own trauma stemming from abuse, that his team fed Lamar false information about having a secret daughter, and that Lamar had not seen his children in six months. He reiterates his allegations that Lamar abused Alford. Writing on social media, Drake predicted Lamar would respond shortly: "And we know you're dropping 6 mins after so instead of posting my address you have a lot to address". "The Heart Part 6" received negative reviews and amassed an estimated one million dislikes on YouTube. Lamar did not respond, and in June, Drake deleted an Instagram post promoting it, a move that observers interpreted as a white flag admission.

In response to Drake telling him to "shut [his] ho ass up and make some drums" on "Push Ups", on May 5, Metro Boomin released "BBL Drizzy", an instrumental that samples an AI-generated R&B parody song referencing a rumor that Drake received a Brazilian butt lift (BBL). Metro Boomin announced he would give a free beat and US$10,000 to whoever recorded the best Drake diss track over the instrumental. "BBL Drizzy" went viral on social media, receiving more than 3.3 million streams on SoundCloud within a week and topping the platform's "New and Hot" chart. In addition to freestyle raps, fans created house, merengue, and Bollywood remixes, as well as saxophone, guitar, and harp covers. On May 24, Drake rapped over the "BBL Drizzy" instrumental for his guest appearance on Sexyy Red's song "U My Everything", which Variety described as him trolling Metro Boomin.

=== June–July ===
On Juneteenth, Lamar headlined a one-off concert at the Kia Forum in Inglewood, California, the Pop Out: Ken & Friends, named after a lyric from "Not Like Us". Lamar opened his set with "Euphoria", which contained updated lyrics aimed at Drake's possession of Shakur's crown ring. Later, he performed "6:16 in LA" (with Ab-Soul), and then his verse on "Like That". Lamar and Dr. Dre then performed Dre's songs "Still D.R.E." (1999) and "California Love" (1995), the latter of which features Shakur. Dre spoke the introductory line of "Not Like Us" ("Pssst, I see dead people"), before Lamar performed it five consecutive times while dancing on stage with colleagues and members of local gangs such as Crips and Bloods, some of whom were publicly associated with Drake.

Lamar released a music video for "Not Like Us" on July 4, American Independence Day. Directed by Free and Lamar, the video features cameos from Tommy the Clown and the National Basketball Association (NBA) player DeMar DeRozan (a Compton native and former player on Drake's hometown Toronto Raptors), and is set in Lamar's hometown of Compton, California. The video received over 13 million views on YouTube within a day. Numerous publications called the video a victory lap for Lamar; Vibe described it as Lamar's "knockout punch" against Drake. Journalists wrote the video appeared to refute many of the allegations Drake levied at Lamar, as it depicts Lamar's family happily dancing together, and the credits emphasize Free and Lamar's collaboration.

== 2024–present: Subsequent developments ==
=== 2024 ===
In September 2024, Lamar was announced as the headlining act for the February 2025 Super Bowl LIX halftime show at the Caesars Superdome in New Orleans. In the announcement video, Lamar said, "You know it's only one opportunity to win a championship. No round twos," an apparent reference to Drake posting a few weeks earlier that "we will win Game 2". Following this, Lamar released the Instagram-only "Watch the Party Die". He does not mention Drake by name, but expresses a desire to use the feud to shift hip-hop away from glorifying luxury and the celebrity lifestyle and towards music with deeper meaning. On November 22, Lamar released his sixth studio album GNX. GNX does not include any of Lamar's diss tracks, nor does it mention Drake by name, but in many of its songs, particularly the opening track "Wacced Out Murals", Lamar reflects on the feud and indirectly insults Drake. GNX includes "Heart Pt. 6", which Billboard interpreted as Lamar reclaiming the "Heart" title while not acknowledging Drake's song by subtly changing the title.

On November 25, Drake appeared on a livestream with the Canadian streamer xQc, describing himself as "fully intact, mind, body, and soul." He said that "you need facts to take me out, fairy tales won't do it," and insulted the Weeknd and the Lamar collaborator Steve Lacy. Lamar and Lacy reacted to the stream with amusement. On the same day, Drake filed a petition against Universal Music Group (UMG)—the label to which he and Lamar are signed—and Spotify alleging they violated the RICO Act by using illegal tactics to boost streams for "Not Like Us". UMG denied the allegations and said that "no amount of contrived and absurd legal arguments in this pre-action submission can mask the fact that fans choose the music they want to hear". On November 26, Drake filed another petition against UMG, alleging defamation and a "pay-to-play" scheme between UMG and iHeartRadio. On December 20, Spotify denied allegations of "any arrangement" with UMG. Drake's legal representation responded that Spotify and UMG "should be perfectly fine complying with this basic discovery request" if they have "nothing to hide".

=== 2025 ===
On January 3, 2025, the producer and Drake collaborator Conductor Williams posted "Fighting Irish Freestyle", in which Drake addresses the feud. Commentators interpreted lyrics as insulting the NBA player LeBron James, whom Drake was formerly friends with, for attending the Pop Out concert. They interpreted other lyrics as targeting UMG and DeRozan. On January 15, Drake filed a lawsuit against UMG in New York federal court for defamation; Lamar was not named as a defendant. He alleged that the release of "Not Like Us" had led to break-in attempts at his home and required him to travel with increased security and move his son outside of the Toronto area. He accused UMG of "cho[osing] corporate greed over the safety and well-being of its artists," which UMG denied. On March 17, UMG filed a motion to dismiss the lawsuit.

"Not Like Us" won all five of its nominations at the 67th Annual Grammy Awards (Record of the Year, Song of the Year, Best Rap Performance, Best Rap Song, and Best Music Video) on February 2. It became the second rap song to win in the Record of the Year and Song of the Year categories, generally considered the Grammys' most prestigious awards for performance and songwriting in an individual song, respectively. Lamar did not mention Drake in his victory speeches, instead dedicating them to the city of Los Angeles (which had recently been impacted by the January 2025 wildfires), but his outfit—a denim top with denim pants, a "Canadian tuxedo"—was seen as a jab at the Canadian-born Drake.

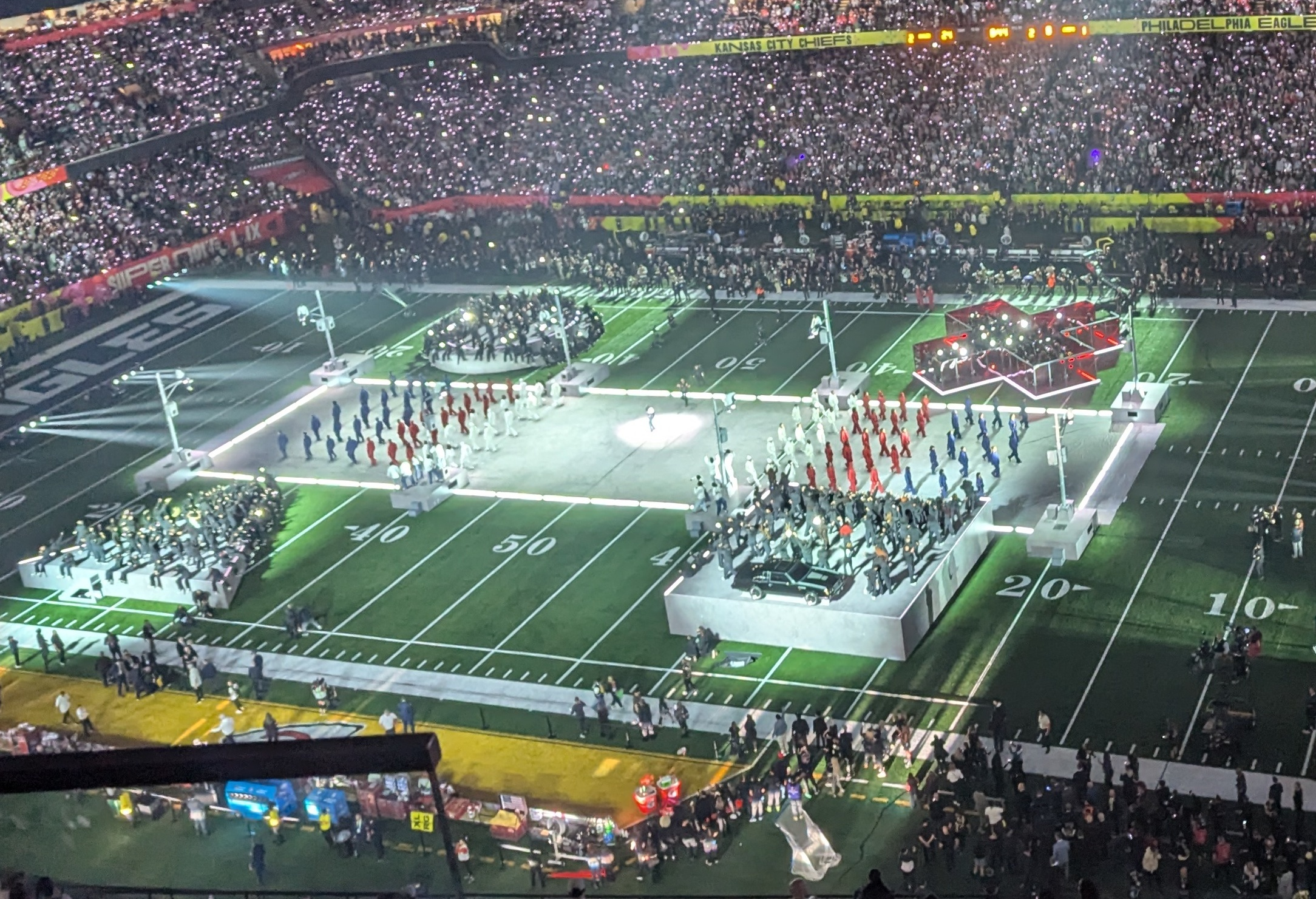
Lamar performed "Euphoria" and "Not Like Us" at the Super Bowl LIX halftime show in 2025.

On February 9, Lamar performed "Euphoria" and "Not Like Us" during the Super Bowl LIX halftime show. In an interlude during his set, Lamar teased "Not Like Us" and alluded to Drake's litigation: "I want to perform their favorite song, but you know they love to sue". In another interlude after performing "All the Stars", he said "they tried to rig the game but you can't fake influence" before performing "Not Like Us". Lamar looked directly into the camera and smiled when rapping "say Drake, I hear you like 'em young". The lyric including the word "pedophile" was censored, though the lyric "tryna strike a chord and it's probably A minor" was not. The American tennis player Serena Williams made a cameo as a dancer; this was interpreted as a jab at Drake, whom she was rumored to have dated several years earlier. Lisa Respers France of CNN called "Not Like Us" the highlight of Lamar's set, and Maria Sherman of the Associated Press called Lamar performing it on the highest profile stage in US sports a few days after sweeping the Grammy Awards "another step in [his] continued victory lap".

Less than a week after Lamar's Super Bowl performance, on February 14, Drake released a collaborative album with PartyNextDoor, Some Sexy Songs 4 U. Drake said he would avoid addressing the feud, but the track "Gimme a Hug" contains a verse that was widely interpreted as reflecting on it. Drake touts his resilience, says he wants to "get the party lit" in reference to "Watch the Party Die", and describes Lamar's music as too cerebral for partying, as it would have "girls... twerking with a dictionary". Around the same time, while on tour in Australia, Drake wore a shirt with bullet holes to symbolize his resilience. In April, Drake amended his lawsuit to include the Super Bowl performance, arguing that the censoring of "pedophile" demonstrated that "Not Like Us" was defamatory. In June, Drake criticized the Canadian politician Jagmeet Singh for attending Lamar's Grand National Tour, prompting Singh to apologize. In July, Drake released the single "What Did I Miss?", in which he criticizes DeRozan, James, and other former friends for attending the Pop Out concert.

On October 9, Judge Jeannette Vargas dismissed Drake's lawsuit against UMG. She held that Drake's case was "logically incoherent", that Lamar's lyrics were "nonactionable opinion" that a reasonable listener would understand were not fact-checked, and that New York law did not permit defamation lawsuits for statements of opinion. Drake appealed on October 29.

=== 2026 ===
In February 2026, Cole released his seventh album, The Fall-Off. He said it was nearly finished before the release of Might Delete Later, with Lamar set to appear on two tracks, but the feud led to him removing Lamar's contributions and reworking it as a double album. The Fall-Off does not concern the feud, but GQ interpreted the track "What If"—which depicts an alternate timeline in which the Notorious B.I.G. and Shakur made amends after the release of Shakur's diss track "Hit 'Em Up"—as explaining Cole's thinking in apologizing to Lamar.

Drake released Iceman, his first solo album following the feud, in May. The feud is a major theme, with Drake reflecting on it and insulting Lamar. On "Make Them Pay", for instance, Drake dismisses Cole's "big three" notion, criticizes Cole for backing out, and repeats his allegation that UMG illegally boosted Lamar's streams. Other songs include lyrics targeting A$AP Rocky, LeBron James, Mustard, Pusha T, and Rick Ross, among others. In "Ran to Atlanta", whose title references a line from "Not Like Us", Drake defends his work with Atlanta rappers. Future makes a guest appearance despite having sided with Lamar in 2024; Drake raps that they have reconciled.

== Analysis ==
MSNBC described the feud as a debate regarding hip-hop's future, with Lamar and Drake, as Rolling Stone wrote, representing "facsimiles of two different hip-hop worldviews". Drake, one of many "rappers turned pop stars" akin to 50 Cent, LL Cool J, and Nelly, was seen as representative of commerciality, his music catchy, having broad appeal, and released regularly. While this has brought him success, it led to accusations that he was inauthentic to hip-hop culture. In contrast, Lamar was seen as focused on profundity and ambition, his music challenging and released less frequently, similar to Nas, Shakur, and West. His music has attracted greater acclaim, but does not perform as well commercially. Journalists drew parallels to the Nas–Jay-Z feud, which similarly concerned authenticity and commerciality.

Drake and Lamar compared the feud to the reported rivalry between Michael Jackson and Prince, which The Ringer summarized as "numbers vs. 'real' art". Drake argued high streaming numbers and stardom were vital, while Lamar viewed himself as defending traditional hip-hop values. Billboard described Lamar, in defending hip-hop's integrity, as continuing Pusha T's approach of attacking Drake's character, racial identity, and relationships. While Lamar considered Drake inauthentic, Drake criticized Lamar's gaps between releases and said his music was not as profound as it is presented. The insults in the diss tracks were initially trivial, but became increasingly severe and personal as the feud continued. Pitchfork likened the early diss tracks to professional wrestling before "Family Matters" and "Meet the Grahams" progressed into dark, unsettling subject matter. Multiple commentators, including Todd Boyd, compared the feud to the East Coast–West Coast rivalry in this regard, and observers said Cole was wise to withdraw despite the initial mockery he received.

Drake and Lamar used women and family members as fodder for insults, and attacked the other's masculinity. The University of Southampton's Steven Gamble observed that they accused each other of misogyny and harming women, but "weaponized [the allegations] as aspects of improper male behaviour rather than [treating them as] actual problems that need addressing". Journalists found hypocrisy in both of their messaging. Drake accused Lamar of domestic violence despite having expressed support for Chris Brown and Tory Lanez, who were both arrested for violence against women. Lamar accused Drake of sexual predation despite having previously collaborated with Kodak Black, who was indicted for sexual assault; in 2025, he faced additional criticism for collaborating with Playboi Carti, who was accused by his former partner Iggy Azalea of being a deadbeat parent, despite having mocked Drake's parenting. The Ringer described Drake and Lamar's allegations as "disingenuous at best—and outright craven at the worst", and bringing their rivalry to hip-hop feuds' traditional endpoint of "men using women, wives, baby mothers, parents, and children in increasingly gross and depraved ways to satisfy their rabid egos".

Social media played a larger role compared to previous hip-hop feuds. Whereas listeners had to wait for music releases via radio or CD in the past, social media allowed Drake and Lamar to release their diss tracks instantly. This enabled fans to quickly interact and made the feud more accessible to those outside of hip-hop culture. Stan culture was a prevalent factor, with the music critic Pablo Hawkins observing that fans were not judging the music fairly, but rather by how passionate their fandom for the artist was. Vice noted that Drake and Lamar's fans "vehemently oppose playing the other's music, regardless of the quality". Metro Boomin contrasted this with the Jay-Z–Nas feud, in which many listeners were fans of both.

=== Hip-hop community ===
Journalists have described the feud as a hip-hop "civil war", owing to the involvement of multiple artists and the centrality of disagreements about the direction of hip-hop. Within the hip-hop community, Drake received support from Birdman, Azealia Banks, Boi-1da, 50 Cent, the Game, Juelz Santana, and Young Thug. The Ringer observed that many blog era artists sided with Lamar; he received support from Metro Boomin, Pusha T, Malice, the Weeknd, ASAP Rocky, Ross, and Jay Rock. West took contradictory positions, shifting between support for Lamar, support for Drake, and belittlement of both. 21 Savage, though a frequent collaborator of Drake, expressed neutrality; in 2025, he said he considered the feud unwinnable and had advised Drake against engaging.

Other hip-hop figures criticized the feud. Boosie Badazz felt it undermined Drake and Lamar's careers and respective contributions to the genre. Kurupt, Ice Cube, and Questlove expressed similar sentiments; Kurupt, recalling Shakur and the Notorious B.I.G.'s murders, warned Drake and Lamar the severity of their allegations could put them in danger. André 3000 expressed sadness over the feud. Macklemore criticized the feud for overshadowing coverage of the Gaza war, rapping in his pro-Palestinian song "Hind's Hall" (2024) "I want a ceasefire, fuck a response from Drake". Jay-Z, who came to regret his feud with Nas, questioned whether hip-hop had evolved beyond the need for feuds due to social media and the development of stan culture, feeling the diss tracks' content and the ensuing discussions had gone too far. He and Cole expressed dismay at the feud's effects on hip-hop discourse, particularly fans using it to disparage Drake.

=== Verdict ===
Lamar was widely regarded as the feud's victor. His quick release of "Meet the Grahams" blunted the impact of the "Family Matters" allegations and appeared to catch Drake off-guard. Billboard and the journalist Peter Berry said that Lamar adopted Drake's own strategies to outmaneuver him, exploiting meme culture and releasing a catchy, club-friendly song ("Not Like Us") similar to how Drake outwitted Meek Mill. The Ringer wrote that in 2015, Drake had succeeded in leveraging the then-novel meme culture against Meek Mill, but was at a disadvantage in 2024 due to Lamar's less accessible nature on the internet.

The Ringer wrote that Drake's diss tracks lacked focus, as he took time away from Lamar to attack smaller rappers like A$AP Rocky and Ross, as well as non-rappers like Metro Boomin and the Weeknd. Billboard concurred, noting that while both released four major diss tracks each, only two of Drake's focus solely on Lamar, while all of Lamar's focus solely on Drake. The Ringer said that Drake mistakenly believed "Family Matters" would quickly end the feud and that Drake lying during his feuds with Meek Mill and Pusha T made his allegations about Lamar difficult to believe. Drake's claim that Lamar based his allegations on his own trauma stemmed from a misinterpretation of "Mother I Sober" (2022), which The Ringer considered indicative that Drake did not understand Lamar. In contrast, they considered Lamar's allegations straightforward and more in line with Drake's known characteristics.

By early May 2024, Pitchfork, The Ringer, and Rolling Stone had deemed Lamar as winning, and Laurence Ralph wrote in The New York Times that the winners were Lamar and old-school hip hop. However, Pitchfork and The Ringer considered Lamar's victory "pyrrhic" and hollow due to his and Drake's careless treatment of severe allegations. Questlove condemned Drake and Lamar for engaging in "wrestling match level mudslinging" and argued that neither could be considered to have emerged victorious. With the release of the "Not Like Us" music video, numerous critics and publications recognized Lamar as the victor. In its motion to dismiss Drake's lawsuit, UMG asserted that he "lost a rap battle that he provoked and in which he willingly participated."

== Cultural impact ==
Regarded as one of the largest feuds in hip-hop history, Drake and Lamar's 2024 diss and answer track exchange became a cultural phenomenon and the subject of extensive media coverage and debate. Erasmus University Rotterdam's Guilherme Giolo, Daniel Trottier, and Simone Driessen described it as "a sprawling cultural event" that exceeded music and "became a proxy for cultural affiliations, political positions, and aesthetic sensibilities". Discourse intersected with commentary on topics such as the politics and cancel culture; Giolo, Trottier, and Simone wrote that siding with Drake or Lamar was seen as "symbolic of one's stance on larger issues".

=== Effect on hip-hop ===
The Ringer characterized the feud as "the last great rap beef", due to hip-hop becoming increasingly niche and West's work with Ty Dolla Sign leaving Drake and Lamar the only rappers "capable of hoarding [substantial] cultural real estate". The feud enhanced Lamar's public image while damaging Drake's. The Ringer called Lamar's Super Bowl halftime performance announcement the capstone of a year that had seen him "ascend to the highest levels" of popular culture, and seen Drake "sink to the lowest levels" of his career. Journalists described Drake's loss as an unprecedented humiliation; Berry called it "probably the biggest loss any rapper has ever taken in a big rap conflict" due to the widely publicized nature of the feud. Sowmya Krishnamurthy said the feud ended the popular perception of Drake as the leading hip-hop figure, and The New Yorker asked, "Has there ever been as clear a loser as Drake?" His legal actions against UMG drew mockery, creating the perception that he was a sore loser. Journalists observed that Drake had struggled to recover from the loss by 2026, and viewed Iceman as critical for his reputation. Nonetheless, his music remained popular. Gamble argued the feud was beneficial to both Drake and Lamar, as it led to increased streams and publicity.

By 2026, the feud continued to dominate hip-hop discourse, which Rolling Stone attributed to the perception that it remained unsettled despite Lamar's victory. Its effects on hip-hop have been debated; Cole, Jay-Z, and Questlove felt it had a detrimental effect, with Questlove declaring it represented hip-hop's death. Pitchfork labeled the feud "the most miserable spectacle in rap history", calling it a "disinformation campaign... that, at its core, is nothing but ugly" and "doesn't even sound like rap beef anymore, but the death knell of an entire era". Conversely, The Independent likened the feud to a literary debate, with Drake and Lamar's poetic talents elevating their conflict from celebrity gossip to art. They wrote that the feud "has caused both men to dig deep and produce some of their best work in years". Yemi Abiade of BBC News said the feud "entertained the entire world, enhancing the legacies of two generational rap artists" and asserted that "rap music wins, yet again".

=== In politics ===
The feud occurred during the 2024 United States presidential election campaign cycle, and Giolo, Trottier, and Simone found that commentary often associated Drake and Lamar with politicians and ideologies. Drake's "perceived egotism, misogyny, or overexposure" often drew comparisons to the Republican nominee Donald Trump, while Lamar was likened to an activist or opposition figure. The campaign team of the presumptive Democratic nominee, President Joe Biden, used "Euphoria" in a video that featured edited lyrics criticizing Trump's behavior. After Biden withdrew from the election, the Democratic nominee, Vice President Kamala Harris, incorporated "Not Like Us" into her own presidential campaign. During the 2024 Democratic National Convention, "Not Like Us" was one of the songs that represented California at the ceremonial roll call.

=== In popular culture ===
Uma Thurman jokingly offered her Kill Bill costume to Drake, and the WWE producer Shawn Michaels, whose Sweet Chin Music finishing move was mentioned in "Not Like Us", invited Drake and Lamar to settle their feud on WWE NXT. During his face-off against John Cena on SmackDown before the 2025 Night of Champions, CM Punk said "you're gonna lose to Kendrick, 'cause bitch, you are my Drake!" After defeating Canada in the 2024 Copa América semifinals, the Argentine national football team posted images with "Not Like Us" emblazoned above a photo of the team, a jab at Drake for betting $300,000 on the Canadian team. Following the win over Lamar's hometown Los Angeles Dodgers over Drake's hometown Toronto Blue Jays in the 2025 World Series, the Dodgers referenced the beef with a post captioned "THEY STILL NOT LIKE US." The coincidental nature of the Dodgers defeating the Blue Jays following Lamar's perceived victory over Drake was subject of significant social media jest. At the 97th Academy Awards, host Conan O'Brien referenced Lamar's Super Bowl halftime show, joking that because it was the halfway point of the show, it was time "for Kendrick Lamar to come out and call Drake a pedophile."

Saturday Night Live parodied the feud with a May 2024 Weekend Update segment in which Dua Lipa, Mikey Day, Heidi Gardner, and Devon Walker portrayed incompetent talk show hosts attempting to explain it. The professional basketball players Stephen Curry and James, who Lamar mentioned in "Meet the Grahams", discussed the frequent usage of "Not Like Us" after a Team USA basketball match. Curry said "it's not the only song in America" while James said he loves the song, while agreeing that "we gotta get something else." Curry later said in an interview with GQ that he was still a "big Drake guy".

== See also ==
- 2024 in hip hop music
- List of diss tracks
- 50 Cent–Ja Rule feud
