= Family Matters (Drake song) =

2024 diss track by Drake

Single by Drake
- Released: May 3, 2024
- Recorded: 2024
- Genre: Hip-hop; drill; downtempo
- Length: 7:36
- Label: OVO; Republic
- Songwriter: Aubrey Graham
- Producers: Boi-1da; Tay Keith; Dramakid; Mark Ronson; Kevin Mitchell; Fierce

Drake singles chronology
"Push Ups" (2024)	"Family Matters" (2024)	"Wah Gwan Delilah" (2024)

Music video
- "Family Matters" on YouTube

"Family Matters" is a diss track by the Canadian rapper Drake released amidst his highly publicized feud with the American rapper Kendrick Lamar. It was released on May 3, 2024, through OVO Sound and Republic Records, alongside a music video, as a response to Lamar's "Euphoria" and "6:16 in LA".

Produced by Boi-1da, Tay Keith, Dramakid, Mark Ronson, Kevin Mitchell and Fierce, "Family Matters" is a hip-hop track divided into three sections, with drill and downtempo portions. Its lyrical content marked an intensification of Drake and Lamar's feud; Drake alleges that Lamar is a domestic abuser, that he is unfaithful to his fiancée Whitney Alford, and that one of their children was fathered by Lamar's creative partner Dave Free. In addition to Lamar, Drake attacks Future, Rick Ross, ASAP Rocky, Kanye West, Metro Boomin, Pharrell Williams, and the Weeknd.

"Family Matters" received positive reviews, with praise for its lyricism and production, as well as the Easter eggs in the music video. It debuted at number seven on the US Billboard Hot 100. Lamar responded to "Family Matters" within an hour, with "Meet the Grahams".

== Background ==
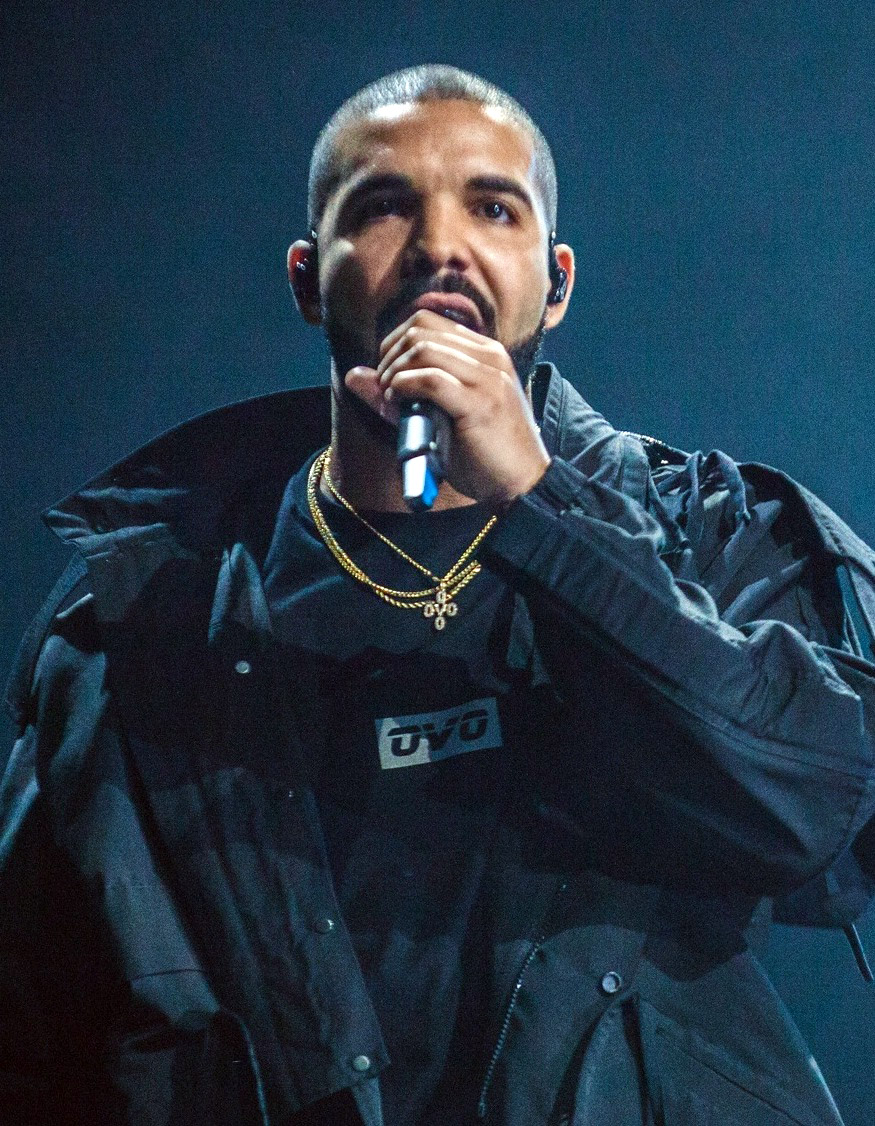
Drake in 2016

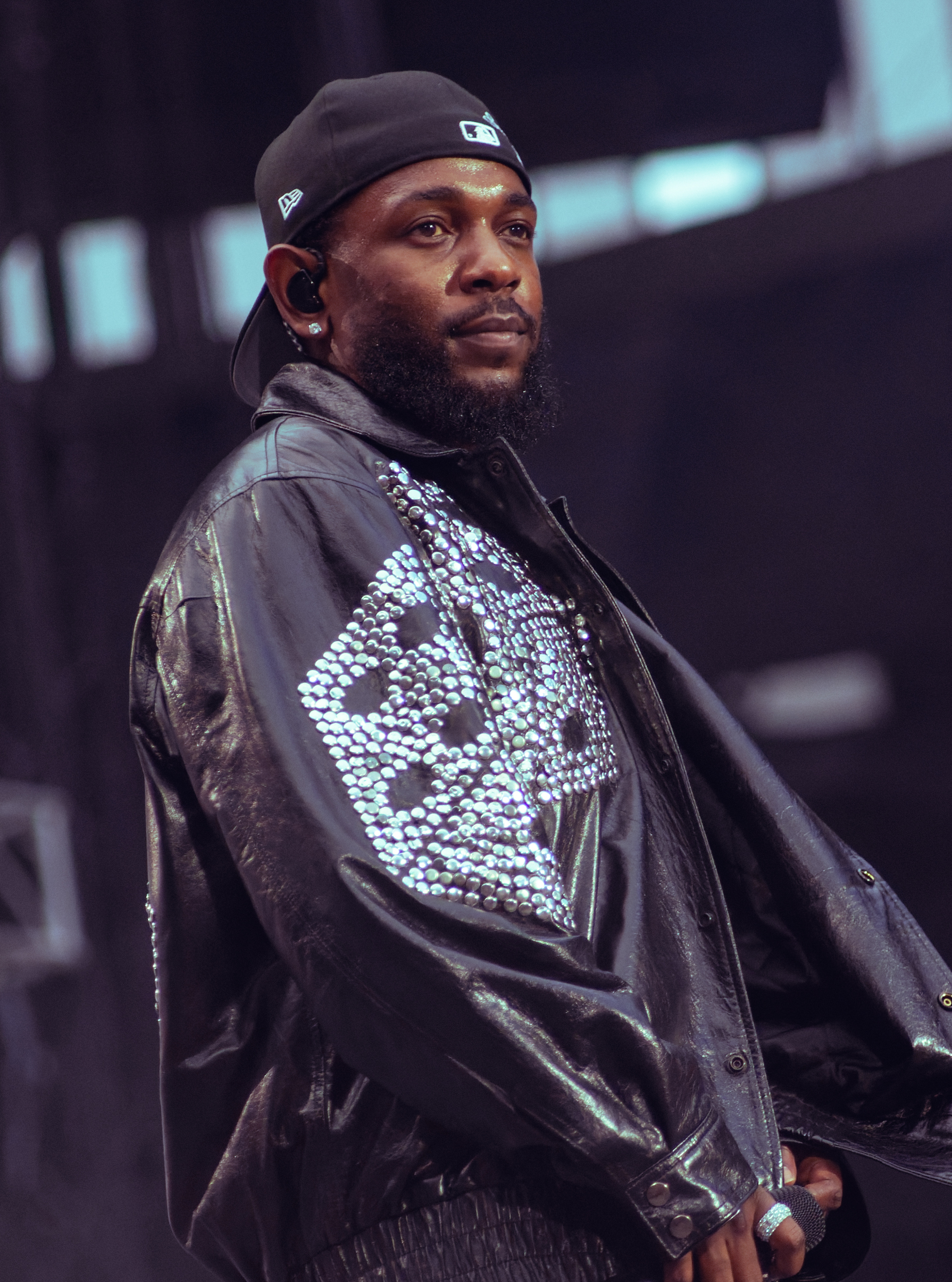
Lamar in 2025

The Canadian rapper Drake and the American rapper Kendrick Lamar have been involved in a rap feud since the early 2010s. After years of sneak disses (intentionally subtle diss lyrics), the feud escalated following the release of Drake and the American rapper J. Cole's "First Person Shooter" (2023), in which Cole called himself, Drake, and Lamar the "big three" of modern hip-hop. This prompted Lamar to diss Drake and Cole on "Like That", released on March 22, 2024, through Future and Metro Boomin's collaborative album We Don't Trust You. The feud quickly grew to involve blog era hip-hop artists such as ASAP Rocky, Kanye West, Rick Ross, and the Weeknd. Future and Metro Boomin's We Still Don't Trust You, released on April 12, featured additional Drake disses.

Cole responded to "Like That" with the diss track "7 Minute Drill" on April 5, but two days later, apologized and removed it from streaming services. On April 13, Drake responded with "Push Ups", in which he criticizes Lamar's collaborations with pop artists, mocks his short stature, and asserts that multiple artists have Lamar "wiped down". On April 19, Drake released "Taylor Made Freestyle", which features artificial intelligence-generated vocals of Tupac Shakur and Snoop Dogg—who, like Lamar, are West Coast hip-hop figures—to goad Lamar into responding. He removed "Taylor Made Freestyle" on April 26, after the Shakur estate threatened to sue him for violating Shakur's personality rights. On April 30, Lamar responded with "Euphoria", in which he expresses his hatred for Drake, mocks his parenting skills and insecurities about his race, and criticizes his alleged use of ghostwriters.

== Recording and release ==
On May 3, 2024, Lamar released "6:16 in LA", in which he claims that members of Drake's team are leaking information to him, and threatens to expose Drake's darkest secrets if he does not withdraw from the feud. Drake responded with a parody remix of "Buried Alive Interlude", a song from his album Take Care (2011) that featured a verse from Lamar, to announce "Family Matters". In the parody, Drake mocks Lamar's rapping abilities and claims he is basing his claims on social media rumors. "Family Matters" was released that day, alongside a music video.

In a leaked version of "Push Ups", Drake claims that Lamar has been withholding a diss track for four years and dares him to release it or "shut [his] mouth"; the "Push Ups" outro also uses the same beat as the opening of "Family Matters". This led music journalists to conclude that Drake had the "Family Matters" concept and allegations prepared in advance and sought to goad Lamar into giving him an opportunity to use them.

== Composition ==
"Family Matters", produced by Boi-1da, Tay Keith, Dramakid, Mark Ronson, Kevin Mitchell, and Fierce, is a hip-hop track with a runtime of seven minutes and 36 seconds. Complex described "Family Matters" as a "drive-by soundtrack", and GQ said it was "essentially three songs in one", as it features a beat switch between each verse. HotNewHipHop said the beat switches mimic Lamar's musical style and described the sound as "heavyweight", reflecting the serious lyrical content with deep basslines and an urgent rhythm. The first verse uses the same beat as the outro of "Push Ups", while the second uses a drill beat and the third uses a downtempo one. The first verse includes an interpolation of Sexyy Red's chorus on "Rich Baby Daddy" (2023), and during the third verse, Drake rap-sings with vocals processed through Auto-Tune.

=== Lyrics ===
"Family Matters" is primarily a response to "Euphoria", but also addresses Ross's "Champagne Moments" and Future and Metro Boomin's "Show of Hands" (with ASAP Rocky), "All to Myself" (with the Weeknd), and "Like That Remix" (with West). Lyrically, it marked an intensification of Drake and Lamar's feud; Drake makes "salacious but unsubstantiated" allegations concerning Lamar's personal life, pushing the feud, as The Ringer wrote, "into nuclear territory". Complex compared "Family Matters" to Drake pressing a red button.

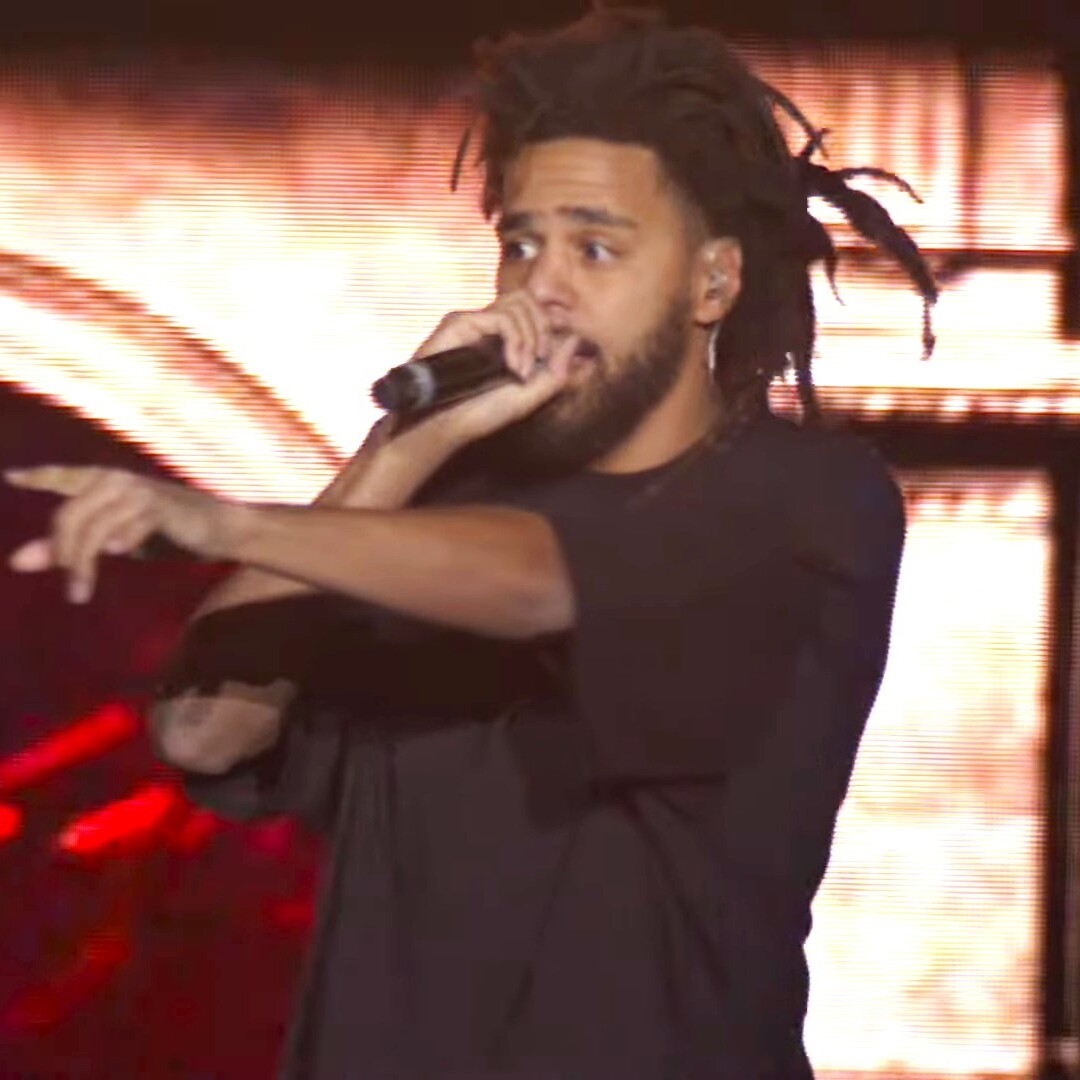
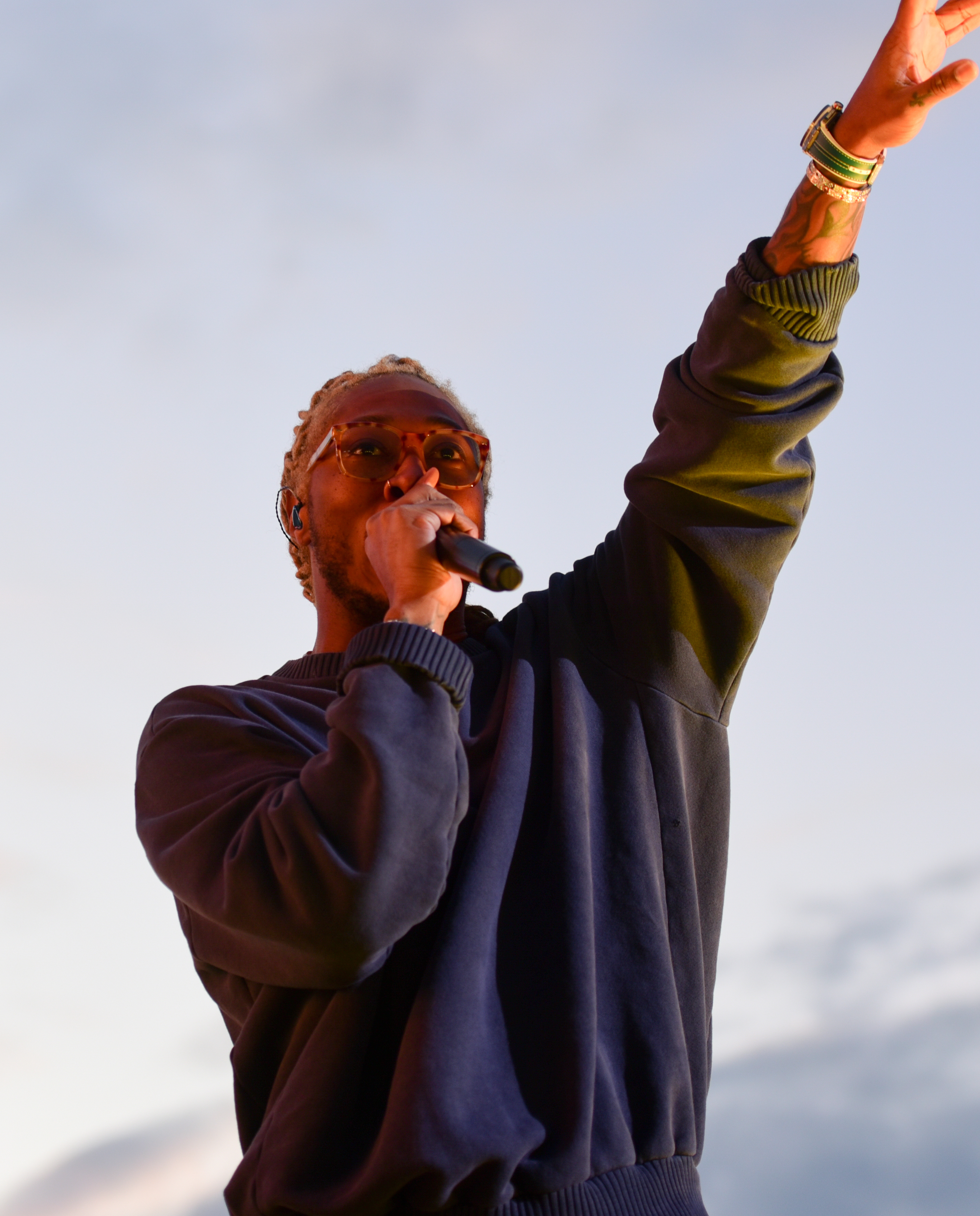
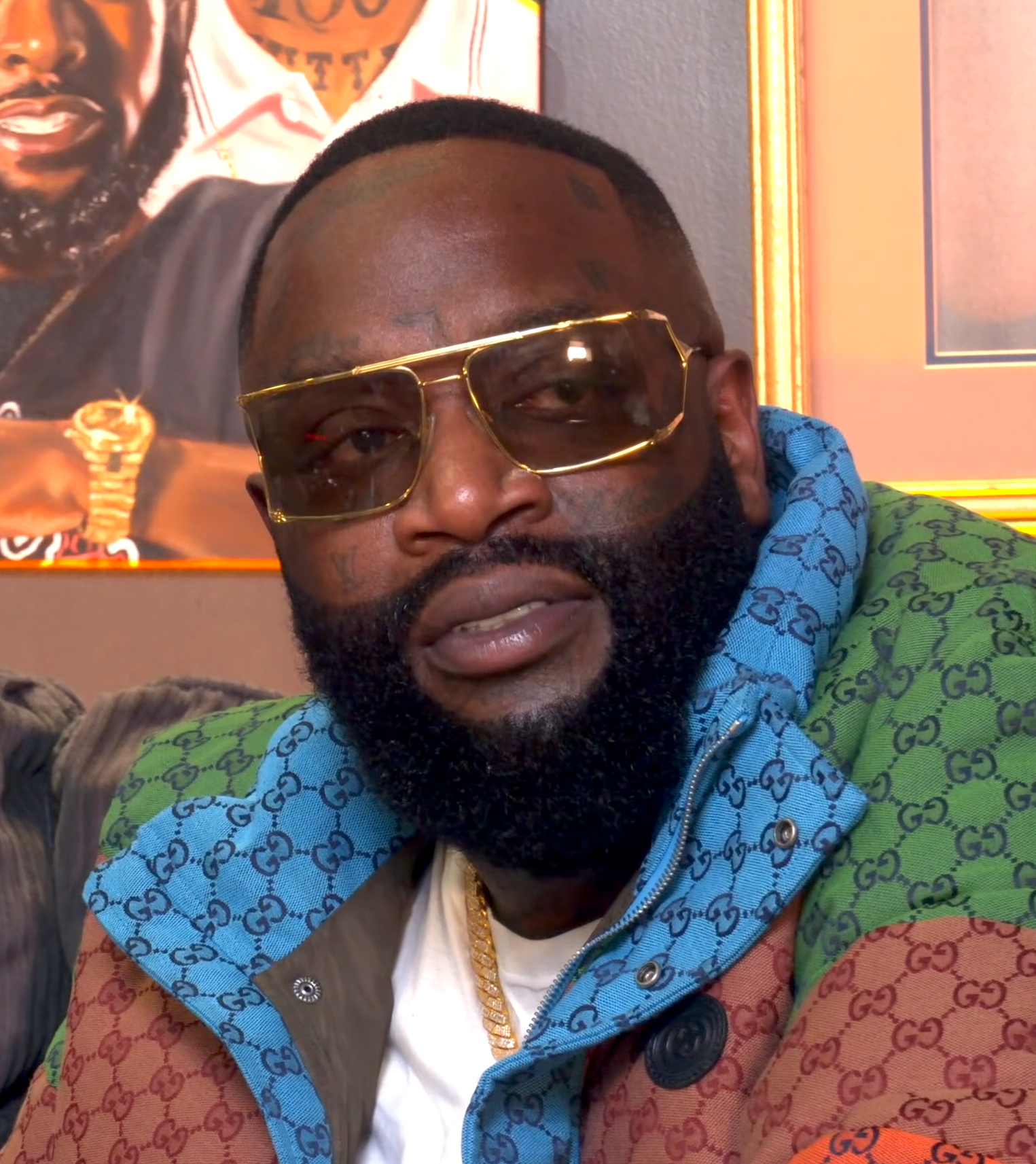
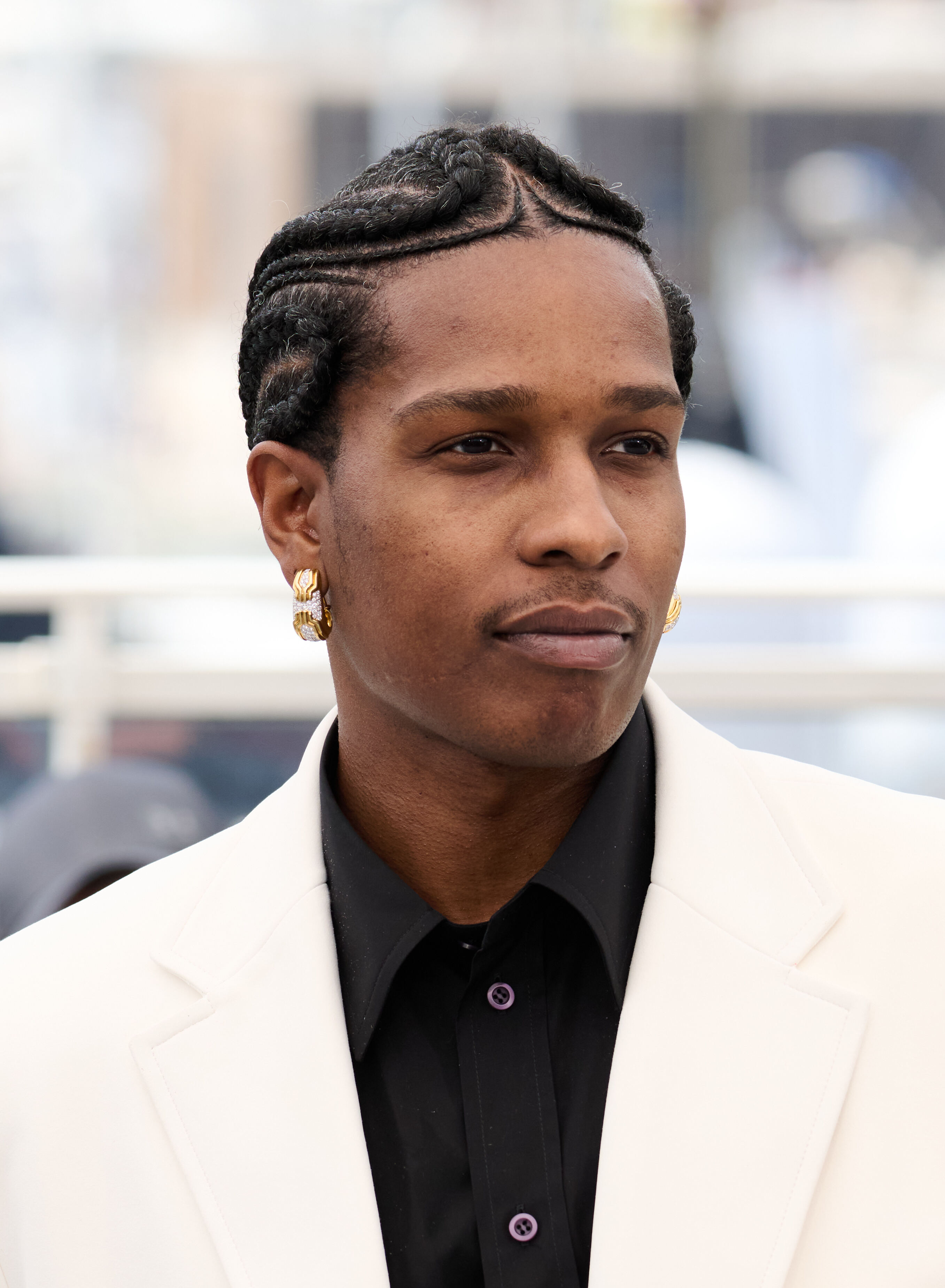
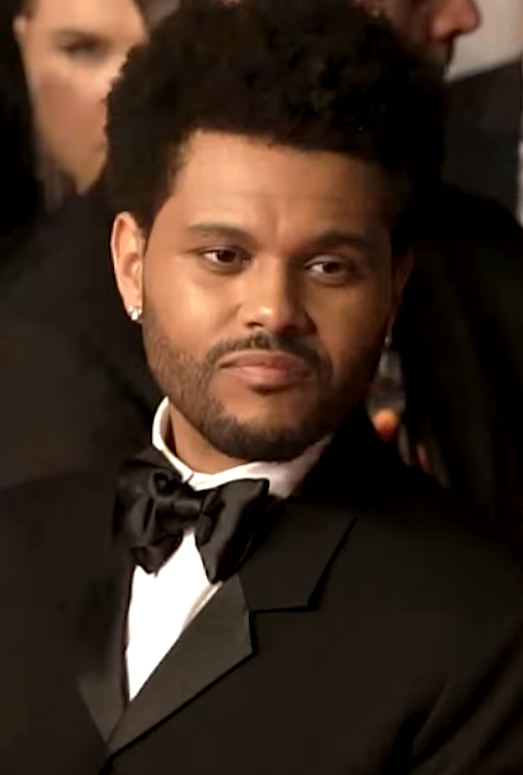
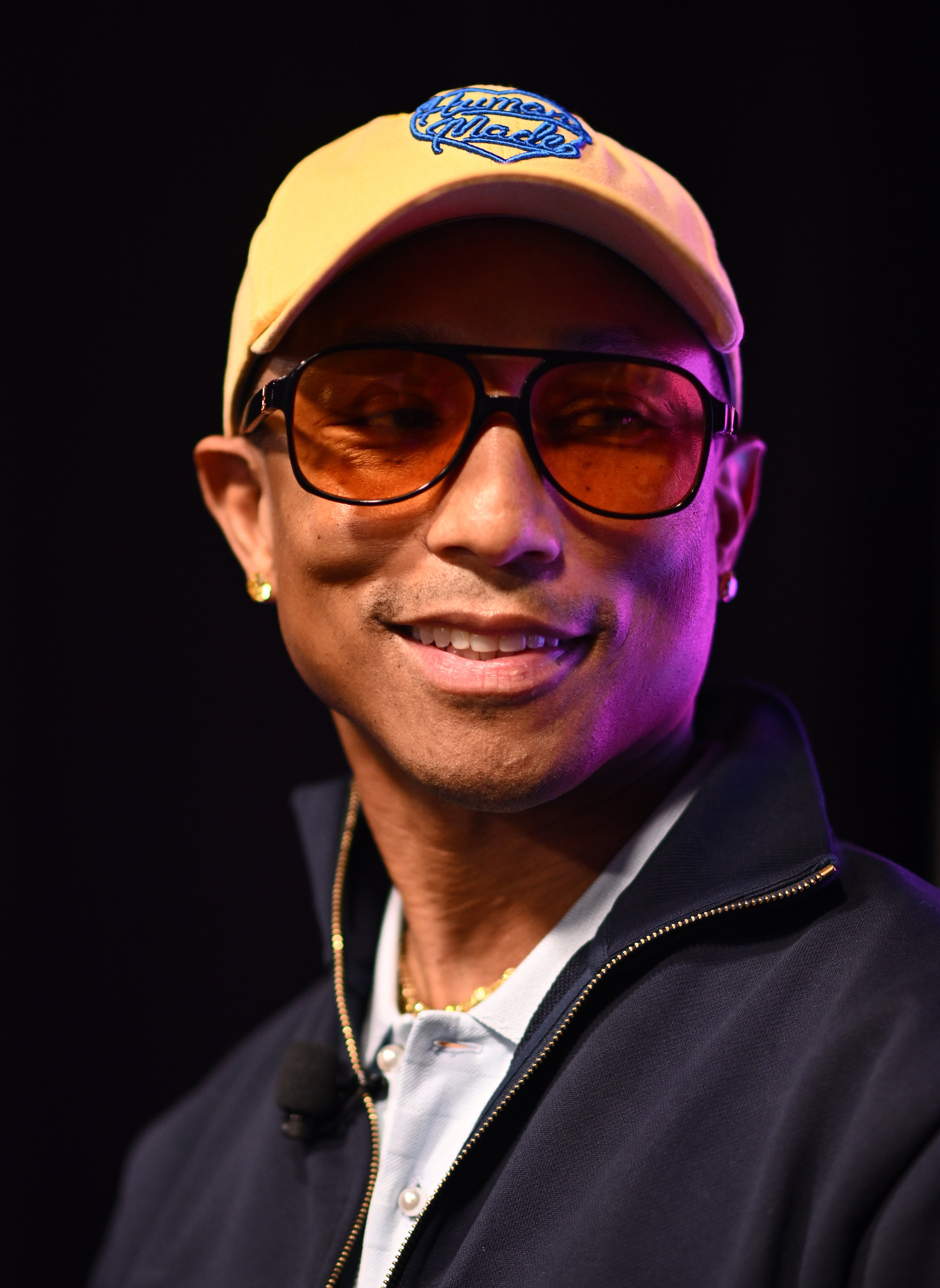
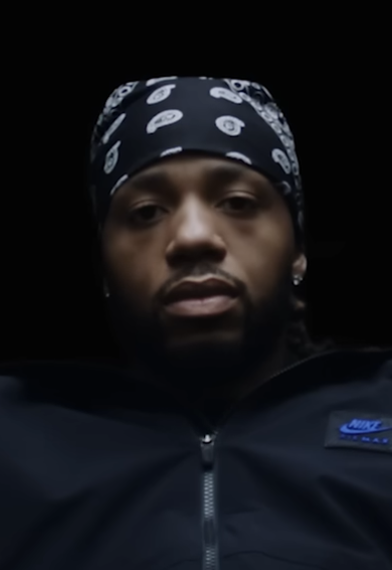
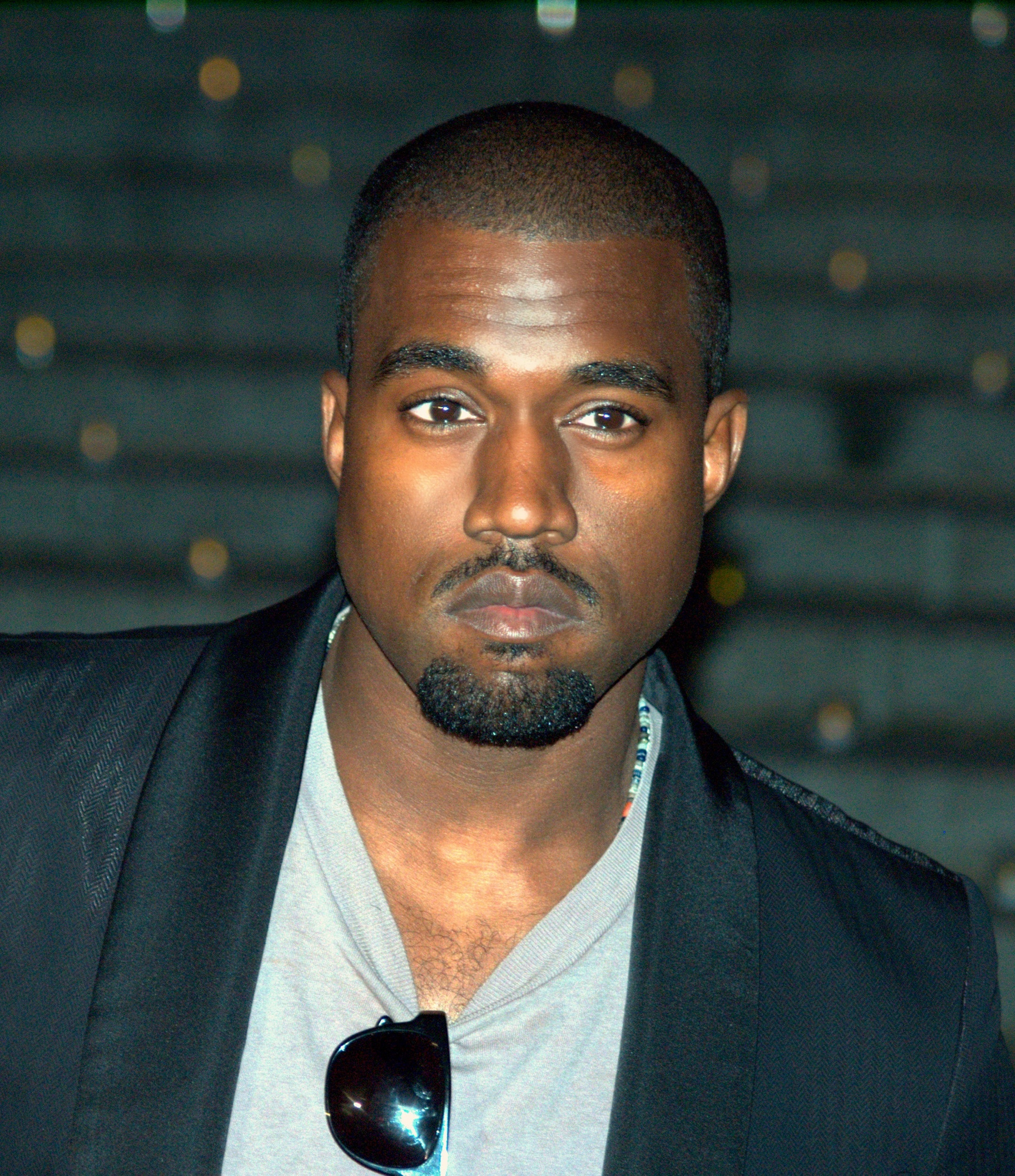
Besides Lamar, Drake insults (clockwise from top left): the rappers J. Cole, Future, Rick Ross, ASAP Rocky, and Kanye West; the producers Metro Boomin and Pharrell Williams; and the singer the Weeknd.

"Family Matters" opens with a voice clip from Drake's mother, Sandi, who advises him not to open with the word nigga—a reference to "Euphoria", in which Lamar raps that he dislikes Drake using it. Drake responds with nigga and says that because Lamar mentioned his son in "Euphoria", he is escalating. After praising other West Coast-based artists such as YG, Drake accuses Lamar of hypocrisy for mocking his biracial identity, as Lamar's fiancée, Whitney Alford, is mixed-race. He alleges that Lamar and Alford's relationship is strained, that Lamar has affairs with white women, and that Lamar is a deadbeat parent and domestic abuser. He dismisses Lamar's conscious lyricism as performative activism, and says he has heard rumors that one of Lamar and Alford's children was fathered by Lamar's business partner, Dave Free. He briefly insults Cole and Metro Boomin.

In the second verse, Drake attacks musicians who participated in the feud on Lamar's side. He accuses Ross of using the weight-loss drug Ozempic and mocks his past in law enforcement; criticizes ASAP Rocky for seemingly using his fashion career and relationship with Rihanna, rather than his music, for attention; and mocks the Weeknd for his drug use and dissing him in a falsetto voice. Drake expresses reluctance to attack Future and accuses Metro Boomin of manipulating him. He does not directly address West, with whom he also has a longstanding feud, but references his ex-wife Kim Kardashian's Skims shapewear brand while criticizing Future and Metro Boomin to gibe at him. Additionally, Drake suggests that Lamar, who has prominently criticized ghostwriting in rap, has used his cousin Baby Keem as a ghostwriter.

The third verse is focused solely on Lamar. Drake criticizes Lamar's music as overrated. In response to Lamar criticizing him for insulting Pharrell Williams, Drake challenges Lamar to recover Williams' jewelry, which Drake acquired for US$3 million. He denies Lamar's claims to have sent a cease and desist to prevent "Like That"'s release and alleges that Lamar contacted Shakur's estate to get "Taylor Made Freestyle" removed. In the previous diss tracks, Drake and Lamar compared themselves to Michael Jackson and Prince. Continuing this, Drake says Lamar is more akin to Jackson: "Michael was prayin' his features would change so people believe that he's actually white / Top would make you do features for change, get on pop records and rap for the whites". He mentions Jackson's less prominent brother Jermaine, who shares his forename with Cole, to suggest that Lamar "wanted [Cole] to stay out of the light". Drake closes "Family Matters" by reiterating the domestic abuse allegations, claiming that Lamar hired a crisis management team to conceal his abuse of Alford.

== Music video ==
The music video is laden with disses to Lamar: Drake was viewed as paying homage to 50 Cent by featuring a vintage G-Unit spinner chain and wears FUBU, with critics noting it as serving as a direct response to Lamar's mention of the brand in "Euphoria". The video also features a third generation Plymouth Grand Voyager, a rebadged version of the Chrysler Town & Country (as both vans are of the same generation & are variants of the Chrysler NS Minivan Platform) featured on the cover of the deluxe edition of Good Kid, M.A.A.D City (2012), being crushed in a junkyard.

References to Lamar's relationship to Whitney Alford, with cakes inscribed with "Happy Divorce" and "Happy Co-parenting", also feature, although Lamar and Alford are only engaged and not married as of yet, alongside a ringed chain: according to Jordan Rose at Complex, fans speculated the ringed chain was similar to the one Lamar gave Alford in 2015, while the presence of a Michael Jackson action figure representing Jackson's song "Black or White" referencing Drake's claims that Lamar cheated on Alford with white women. Drake also flaunts jewelry and memorabilia previously owned or designed by Pharrell Williams, which Drake bought from an auction, and a ring previously owned by Tupac Shakur, also bought by Drake at an auction, the video also shows Drake visiting New Ho King.

== Responses ==
Kendrick Lamar responded with "Meet the Grahams" on the same day that Drake dropped "Family Matters". ASAP Rocky responded with the song "Ruby Rosary" featuring J. Cole, released on September 6, 2024.

== Personnel ==
Credits are adapted from Tidal.

- Drake – lead vocals, lyricist, composer
- Boi-1da – producer
- Fierce – producer
- Kevin Mitchell – producer
- Mark Ronson – producer
- Tay Keith – producer
- Noel Cadastre – mix engineer

== Charts ==
=== Weekly charts ===
Weekly chart performance for "Family Matters"
Chart (2024)	Peak position
Australia (ARIA)	26
Australia Hip Hop/R&B (ARIA)	6
Canada Hot 100 (Billboard)	6
Germany (GfK)	92
Global 200 (Billboard)	11
Greece International (IFPI)	11
Iceland (Tónlistinn)	28
Ireland (IRMA)	21
Israel (Mako Hitlist)	87
Lithuania (AGATA)	49
Middle East and North Africa (IFPI)	8
Netherlands (Single Top 100)	64
New Zealand (Recorded Music NZ)	16
Portugal (AFP)	29
Saudi Arabia (IFPI)	17
South Africa Streaming (TOSAC)	3
Sweden (Sverigetopplistan)	59
Switzerland (Schweizer Hitparade)	32
United Arab Emirates (IFPI)	8
UK Singles (Official Charts)	17
UK Hip Hop/R&B (Official Charts)	3
US Billboard Hot 100	7
US Hot R&B/Hip-Hop Songs (Billboard)	5

=== Year-end charts ===
Year-end chart performance for "Family Matters"
Chart (2024)	Position
US Hot R&B/Hip-Hop Songs (Billboard)	57

== Certifications ==
Certifications for "Family Matters"
Region	Certification	Certified units/sales
Brazil (Pro-Música Brasil)	Gold	20,000^{‡}
^{‡} Sales+streaming figures based on certification alone.
