= Taylor Made Freestyle =

Song by Drake
- Written: April 14, 2024
- Released: April 19, 2024
- Recorded: April 16, 2024
- Genre: Hip hop
- Length: 3:51
- Label: Self-released
- Songwriters: Aubrey Graham; Matthew Samuels; Jeremy McArthur; Ashley Bannister
- Producers: Boi-1da; Arthur McArthur; Blank

"Taylor Made Freestyle" is a diss track by the Canadian rapper Drake in response to Kendrick Lamar, released on April 19, 2024. It followed "Push Ups", another diss directed towards Lamar.

The song features AI-generated vocals of the American rappers Tupac Shakur and Snoop Dogg, and its title references the singer-songwriter Taylor Swift, who is mentioned twice in the lyrics. The use of Shakur's likeness in the song prompted a response from his estate that urged Drake to take down the song for personality rights reasons. Following the response from Shakur's estate, Drake took down the song from all platforms.

== Background ==
In 2024, Kendrick Lamar, Future, and Metro Boomin collaborated on the song "Like That" from Future and Metro Boomin's joint album We Don't Trust You. On the song, Lamar responds to a claim made by J. Cole in his song with Drake, "First Person Shooter", that Cole, Lamar, and Drake are the "Big Three" of contemporary hip hop. Lamar rapped on "Like That" rejecting the idea, saying he trumps them both. Lamar further dissed Drake by calling his best songs a "light pack" and comparing their rivalry to that of Michael Jackson and Prince, saying "Prince outlived Mike Jack." In response, Drake released "Push Ups" on April 19, two versions of which prematurely leaked online a few days prior. After perceiving a lack of response from Lamar, Drake posted a freestyle on his Instagram titled "Taylor Made Freestyle".

According to Arthur McArthur, the song's instrumental was originally created in 2009. It had been submitted to Dr. Dre for his album Detox, along with a chorus from Toronto artist Shi Wisdom; McArthur claimed that Dr. Dre had shown interest in using it for a record featuring Keyshia Cole. He also suggested that Drake had asked to use the instrumental as he "wanted an old-school, West Coast-sounding beat".

== Lyrics ==
"Taylor Made Freestyle" incorporates AI-generated vocals in the style of Tupac Shakur, which appear on the first verse, and of Snoop Dogg, which appear on the second. Drake had previously gone viral a year earlier after AI-generated Drake vocals were used in an unlicensed version of Ice Spice's "Munch (Feelin' U)", prompting criticism from Drake. The verse in the voice of Shakur urges Lamar to diss Drake in the name of West Coast hip hop, and lists ways he can do so: "Call him a bitch for me, talk about him liking young girls as a gift for me." Lamar would later level allegations of pedophilia towards Drake on "Not Like Us". "Snoop Dogg"'s verse, meanwhile, admonishes Lamar for not releasing another diss track sooner and looking like he is setting himself up for failure, saying "World is watching this chess game, but oh you out of moves." The final verse has Drake rapping without AI. On it, he claims the reason why Lamar has not responded to him yet was because he did not want to be overshadowed by the release of Taylor Swift's eleventh studio album, The Tortured Poets Department; he also compares his silence to the "everybody on mute" challenge from Beyoncé's Renaissance World Tour.

== Response ==
The song prompted a threat of legal action from Shakur's estate. Billboard reported that Howard King, the plaintiff, sent Drake a cease-and-desist letter saying that using Shakur's likeness was a violation of Shakur's personality rights and Drake would be sued if "Taylor Made Freestyle" remained on his social media. The estate said that they would have never cleared the AI-generated vocals and said it was an affront to Shakur's legacy; they added that it being used to diss Lamar, who respected Shakur and the estate, compounded the disrespect.

Lamar responded to the diss track with the song "Euphoria" and "6:16 in LA", the feud continued with Drake's "Family Matters" and Lamar's "Meet the Grahams" and "Not Like Us", all three of which were released less than 24 hours from each other. Lamar also referenced the song on his song "Wacced Out Murals", taken from his sixth studio album GNX by stating that he was disappointed in Snoop Dogg for promoting the song on social media, with Snoop Dogg later confirming that he only promoted the song due to being high on cannabis edibles.
