= Diss track =

Song produced to verbally attack another person

A diss track, diss record or diss song (an abbreviation of disrespect or disparage) is a track that verbally attacks someone, usually another artist. Diss tracks are often the result of an existing, escalating hip-hop feud between the two parties; for example, the artists involved may be former members of a group, or artists on rival labels. Such feuds are often called "beefs".

The diss track as a medium of its own was popularized within the hip-hop genre, fueled by the hip-hop rivalry phenomenon (especially the East Coast–West Coast hip-hop rivalry of the mid-1990s). More recently, entertainers from outside the traditional music landscape have adopted the genre.

In the course of constructing their argument, artists often include a wealth of references to past events and transgressions in their diss tracks, which listeners can dive into. Artists who are the subject of a diss track often make one of their own in response to the first. It is this back-and-forth associated with a feud that makes this type of song particularly viral. The term "sneak diss" refers to lyrics in which an artist describes or refers to an individual in a negative or derogatory manner without explicitly naming the target.

== History ==
=== Origin and early examples ===
Though the term "diss track" originated in hip-hop, there are many examples throughout music history of earlier songs written as attacks on specific individuals. Some have also been retroactively described as diss tracks in their own right.

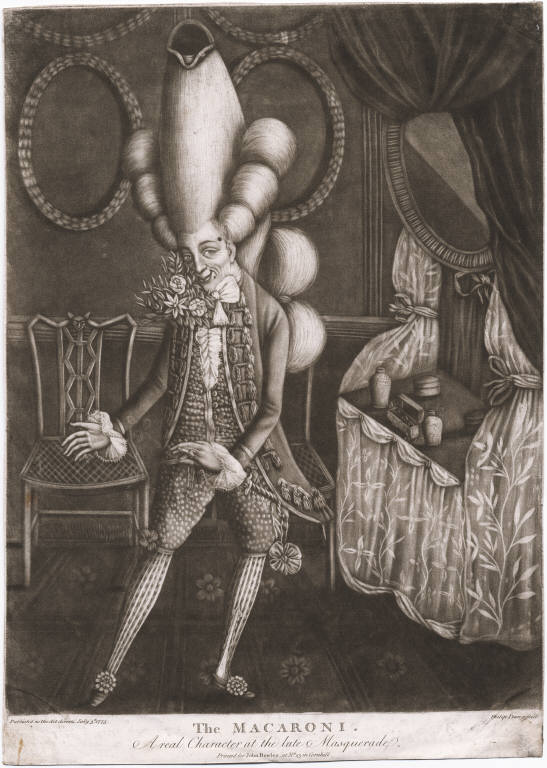
In "Yankee Doodle", a foolish British American Patriot falsely believes he qualifies as a "macaroni" elite (a typical macaroni is pictured).

The 18th-century British American song "Yankee Doodle" has been labeled a "diss song" and "diss track" by The New York Times and Cracked magazine. The song was written by Loyalist colonists against Patriot colonists, opposing sides in the American Revolutionary War. Loyalists (siding with the British monarchy) often sang "Yankee Doodle" directly at Patriots (siding with the American revolutionaries) who were characterized in the song as a foolish and gay man named "Yankee Doodle". Notably in the song, Yankee Doodle puts only a "feather in his cap" and believes he thus qualifies as a "macaroni", a type of fashionable and sophisticated male European elite back then. The song was later reclaimed as an unofficial national anthem of the United States.

Another early example is the 1963 comedy album I Am the Greatest by boxer Muhammad Ali (then named Cassius Clay), released six months prior to Ali winning the first world heavyweight championship fight against Sonny Liston. The album helped establish Ali's reputation as an eloquently poetic "trash talker", dissing Liston and any future contenders several times, as demonstrated on the album's fifth track "Round 5: Will The Real Sonny Liston Please Fall Down". At the album's release, Ali's remarks were treated as mere promotional bragging, until Ali won against Liston in their fight on February 25, 1964. I Am the Greatest is widely considered a precursor of hip-hop music.

Reggae musician Lee "Scratch" Perry was known for writing tracks that insulted his former musical collaborators. One prominent example was the 1967 song "Run for Cover", directed at producer Coxsone Dodd. Another example was "People Funny Boy", a 1968 track which attacked Jamaican reggae producer Joe Gibbs; Gibbs would respond later in the year on the track "People Grudgeful". Perry's 1973 track "Cow Thief Skank" was a diss against fellow record producer Niney the Observer, who was feuding with Perry at the time.

John Lennon of the Beatles wrote "Sexy Sadie", a song released on the band's 1968 album The Beatles, as a diss track aimed at Maharishi Mahesh Yogi, a guru who he felt had been a let-down to them. The original lyrics specifically targeted him, but at the request of George Harrison the lyrics became more vague. Lennon continued writing diss tracks after the break-up of the Beatles; his most forceful such song was "How Do You Sleep?", from his 1971 solo album Imagine. Lennon had the impression that the song "Too Many People" from Paul McCartney's Ram (1971) was a dig at him, something McCartney later admitted, and that other songs on the album, such as "3 Legs", contained similar attacks. As a result, Lennon wrote "How Do You Sleep?" to indirectly mock McCartney's musicianship. While McCartney is never mentioned in the song, the many references make clear he is the target, particularly in the lyrics "The only thing you done was yesterday/And since you've gone you're just another day", the first lyric being a reference to The Beatles' 1965 song "Yesterday" and the second line referring to McCartney's 1971 song "Another Day".

The 1974 song "Sweet Home Alabama" by Lynyrd Skynyrd deliberately insults Neil Young for his criticism of Alabama in the song "Southern Man". Young admitted later "I didn't like my words when I wrote them. They are accusatory and condescending." The 1980 song "Play It All Night Long" by Warren Zevon would in turn mock "Sweet Home Alabama" by depicting it as a favorite song of a dysfunctional, sickly, poverty stricken, and incestuous southern family who would "turn those speakers up full blast/play that dead band's song."

The Sex Pistols are another group who recorded several diss tracks, including "New York", aimed at The New York Dolls, and "E.M.I.", aimed at their former record label EMI.

=== Coalescing of the genre: early hip-hop rivalries ===
In the 1980s, diss tracks began to feature prominently in the hip-hop genre. The first known hip-hop feud (or "beef") was the Roxanne Wars. The Roxanne Wars began in 1984 when Roxanne Shanté and Marley Marl released the song "Roxanne's Revenge", a diss track aimed at the trio U.T.F.O. "Roxanne's Revenge" was a quick success, leading U.T.F.O. to compose a response: they joined forces with Elease Jack and Adelaida Martinez, who adopted the stage name "The Real Roxanne," to release a song under that name in 1985. Roxanne Shanté replied soon afterward, and the feud rapidly expanded from there, with numerous other rappers writing songs that expanded upon the Roxanne mythos.

Another prominent hip-hop feud from the 1980s was The Bridge Wars, a dispute over the birthplace of hip-hop. Marley Marl and MC Shan released the track "The Bridge" in 1985, in which they were perceived as claiming that the genre originated in Queensbridge. KRS-One and Boogie Down Productions responded with "South Bronx" in 1986, and the feud continued to escalate, culminating with Boogie Down Productions' "The Bridge Is Over" in 1987.

There also existed smaller-scale rivalries during this period: Craig Werner describes "interminable ego duels between LL Cool J and Kool Moe Dee" during the later 1980s.

=== East Coast–West Coast hip-hop rivalry ===
The East Coast–West Coast hip-hop rivalry brought about increased popularity for hip-hop diss tracks. This feud began with East Coast rapper Tim Dog's 1991 song "Fuck Compton", which expressed his anger at record companies' preference of West Coast artists over the East Coast. "Fuck Compton" provoked many responses, including Dr. Dre's single "Fuck Wit Dre Day (And Everybody's Celebratin')" and Tweedy Bird Loc's "South Bronx Can't Touch Compton" the following year. In addition to attacking Tim Dog, "Fuck Wit Dre Day" insults Eazy-E, who was one of Dre's fellow N.W.A members prior to the group's dissolution. Eazy-E responded to the diss with "Real Muthaphuckkin G's" in 1993. Other notable diss tracks resulting from the N.W.A breakup include Ice Cube's 1991 single "No Vaseline".

Rappers from other regions also became involved in the East Coast–West Coast feud at times; for instance, Chicago rapper Common exchanged diss tracks with Ice Cube after Common was perceived as having insulted the West Coast on his song "I Used to Love H.E.R."

The East Coast–West Coast rivalry came to be exemplified by the feud between Tupac Shakur and the Notorious B.I.G., which began after Biggie's song "Who Shot Ya?" was interpreted by Shakur as a mockery of his 1994 robbery. Though both the Notorious B.I.G. and Puff Daddy denied involvement and asserted that "Who Shot Ya?" had been recorded before the robbery, Shakur nevertheless retorted on several tracks, most famously "Hit 'Em Up" in 1996.

Another major feud from this era was the feud between Jay-Z and Nas in the late 1990s and early 2000s. Jay-Z dissed Nas (as well as Prodigy of Mobb Deep) on the 2001 track "Takeover", and Nas retorted later that year with "Ether". Ether in particular has come to be seen as a "classic" diss track, and caused "ether" to emerge as a slang term meaning to ruthlessly defeat someone in a rap battle.

=== Contemporary hip-hop rivalries ===
In the 2010s, rivalries among hip-hop musicians have birthed numerous notable diss tracks.

After years of a reported feud and subtle references, rapper Pusha T called out Lil Wayne, as well as Wayne's Cash Money and Young Money record labels, in a 2012 song titled "Exodus 23:1". Lil Wayne responded with a diss track of his own, "Ghoulish". Drake, who at the time was signed to Young Money, subsequently entered the feud with "Tuscan Leather", a song on his 2013 album Nothing Was the Same. Pusha T and Drake then recorded several further diss tracks against each other. In 2016, Pusha T released the freestyle "H.G.T.V." and Drake responded with "Two Birds, One Stone". Pusha T then continued the feud with "Infrared", the closing track of his 2018 album DAYTONA. This song sparked the response "Duppy Freestyle" from Drake, to which Pusha T responded with "The Story of Adidon". The cover of "The Story of Adidon" depicted a young Drake in blackface and featured lyrics revealing that Drake had a son. Due to Drake's high level of commercial success and popularity, the feud and the diss tracks that followed received significant coverage from hip-hop media and beyond.

In 2015, Drake also engaged in a feud against rapper Meek Mill, who alleged that Drake used ghostwriters for his music. Drake's second diss track in response to the allegations was "Back to Back", which went on to become a critical and commercial success.

In 2017, Rapper Remy Ma released a diss track aimed at Nicki Minaj named "Shether", a reference to Nas' "Ether", using the same beat.

In 2018, rapper Eminem, who had a long history of being embroiled in feuds, released "Killshot" in response to Machine Gun Kelly's diss "Rap Devil". Collectively, the official uploads to YouTube alone have raised more than 800 million views as of 2023.

Drake and Kendrick Lamar became embroiled in a feud in early 2024. J. Cole had claimed on 2023's "First Person Shooter" that he, Drake, and Lamar were the "big three" rappers of their generation; Lamar rebutted that claim on the song "Like That", released in March 2024, on which he argued that his skills were superior to either Drake's or Cole's. Drake responded with the tracks "Push Ups" and "Taylor Made Freestyle" in April. Drake used AI-generated vocals to imitate Tupac Shakur's voice on the latter track; he was subsequently threatened with a lawsuit by Shakur's estate, leading him to remove "Taylor Made Freestyle" from streaming later in April. Lamar responded to Drake on April 30 with the track "Euphoria", where he expresses hatred for Drake and levels a range of criticisms, and followed up with "6:16 in LA" on May 3. The feud further escalated on the night of May 3–4, when both rappers released tracks in quick succession: Drake's "Family Matters" accuses Lamar of physical abuse, and Lamar's "Meet the Grahams" – released just 20 minutes later – accuses Drake of having a second unacknowledged child and of sheltering sex offenders. Lamar continued on May 4 by releasing "Not Like Us", which accuses Drake of pedophilia; Drake denied the claim on "The Heart Part 6" the following day, a track where he also alleges that his allies had provided Lamar with false information.

Other rappers have participated in the Drake–Kendrick Lamar feud as well. J. Cole responded to "Like That" with the song "7 Minute Drill", though he later removed it from streaming. Singer the Weeknd, A$AP Rocky, and Rick Ross would all attack Drake on their respective songs "All to Myself", "Show of Hands", and "Champagne Moments" in April. Kanye West also released a remix of "Like That", featuring his own verse dissing both Drake and J. Cole. Metro Boomin, a producer, released "BBL Drizzy", an instrumental diss track.

In January 2024, Megan Thee Stallion released the song "Hiss", which dissed multiple unknown people in the music industry. One lyric in the song; "aye, these hoes ain't mad at Megan, these hoes mad at Megan's Law", was suspected to refer to fellow rapper Nicki Minaj. Megan's Law is a federal law requiring law enforcement authorities to make information available to the public regarding registered sex offenders. Minaj has been criticized for her relationship with registered sex offender, Kenneth Petty, who was convicted of attempted rape in 1995. Minaj responded with the song "Big Foot", which was heavily panned by audiences and critics alike.

=== Online personalities ===
In the late 2010s, personalities from outside the music industry – especially YouTubers – began releasing diss tracks. Diss tracks performed especially well on YouTube, often drawing tens or hundreds of millions of views, spawning internet memes, and earning millions of dollars in AdSense revenue for their creators. Notable YouTubers who have released diss tracks include Logan Paul, Jake Paul, RiceGum, KSI, PewDiePie, and IDubbbzTV. In 2018, YouTuber Jake Paul was certified platinum for his track "It's Everyday Bro", and YouTubers RiceGum and Alissa Violet were certified platinum for "It's Every Night Sis", the diss track they made in response.

In January 2016, rapper B.o.B. and astrophysicist Neil DeGrasse Tyson engaged in a public argument on Twitter after B.o.B. claimed that the Earth was flat. The argument culminated with B.o.B. releasing a diss track against Tyson, titled "Flatline"; Tyson subsequently enlisted his nephew, Stephen Tyson, to write and record a rebuttal titled "Flat to Fact".

==== Brands ====
In 2022, rapper Pusha T and restaurant chain Arby's collaborated to promote Arby's new Spicy Fish Sandwich by releasing a diss track aimed at McDonald's Filet-O-Fish. Pusha and Arby's followed the track with a second one, later in the year, which criticized the McRib.

== See also ==
- Flyting
- Answer song
- Battle rap
- The Dozens
- O du eselhafter Peierl
- Invective
