= 6:16 in LA =

- The cover art depicts Drake's gloves and is a portion of a photo later revealed in its entirety on "Meet the Grahams"

Single by Kendrick Lamar
- Released: May 3, 2024
- Recorded: May 2024
- Genre: Hip-hop
- Length: 3:45
- Songwriters: Kendrick Duckworth; Albert Green
- Producers: Sounwave; Jack Antonoff

Kendrick Lamar singles chronology
"Euphoria" (2024)	"6:16 in LA" (2024)	"Meet the Grahams" (2024)

"6:16 in LA" is a diss track written and recorded by American rapper Kendrick Lamar. As part of the Kendrick-Drake feud, it is the second response track to Canadian rapper Drake's single "Push Ups" and his independently released song "Taylor Made Freestyle". Like "Taylor Made Freestyle", the song was made exclusively available on Instagram, on May 3, 2024.

The song was produced by Sounwave and Jack Antonoff. The song samples Al Green's 1972 song "What a Wonderful Thing Love Is", which features guitarist Mabon "Teenie" Hodges, Drake's uncle.

== Background ==
On April 30, 2024, Lamar unexpectedly released the first diss track "Euphoria" on his YouTube channel and later on streaming services. In similar fashion to the release of Drake's song "Taylor Made Freestyle", which was only available to listen to on his social media channels, Lamar posted the full song through an Instagram post on May 3. He had previously teased a second diss track on "Euphoria" by referencing Drake's Meek Mill diss track "Back to Back" (2015).

The song title "6:16 in LA" plays on the time-and-location-themed tracks that Drake has included on many of his projects, such as "9AM in Dallas" (2010), "5AM in Toronto" (2013), "6PM in New York" (2015), "4PM in Calabasas" (2016), "7AM on Bridle Path" (2021), and "8AM in Charlotte" (2023).

A Maybach driving glove is used as the cover art of this song, a cropped portion of the image used for the cover of Lamar's next single and diss track, "Meet the Grahams". Many publications noted producer Jack Antonoff's involvement, believing it to be in retaliation to Drake's "Taylor Made Freestyle" as Antonoff has been a consistent producer for the titular Taylor Swift.

== Composition ==
On "6:16 in LA", the rapper also takes aim at Drake's record label OVO Sound for the first time, insinuating that OVO members secretly work for Lamar as moles, as well as accusing some of them of speaking ill about Drake behind his back. Lamar references pro-Drake media personality DJ Akademiks, referring to him as "compromised". He also namechecks the viral 2020 hit song "Toosie Slide" and notes how the rapper would be unable to "Toosie Slide his way" up out of this track because it is, according to Lamar, "just going to resurface". In other instances, Lamar pokes fun at Drake's penchant for viral memes and mocks his distinct online activity.
