= Meet the Grahams =

2024 single by Kendrick Lamar

- Original cover from the YouTube video; the cover art on streaming services is a plain black square

Single by Kendrick Lamar
- Released: May 3, 2024
- Recorded: 2024
- Genre: Hardcore hip-hop; horrorcore
- Length: 6:32
- Label: Interscope
- Songwriter: Kendrick Lamar
- Producer: The Alchemist

Kendrick Lamar singles chronology
"6:16 in LA" (2024)	"Meet the Grahams" (2024)	"Not Like Us" (2024)

Streaming cover art

Audio video
- "Meet the Grahams" on YouTube

"Meet the Grahams" (stylized in lowercase) is a diss track by American rapper Kendrick Lamar. It was released on May 3, 2024, through Interscope Records, during his ongoing feud with Canadian rapper Drake. It is Lamar's response to the release of Drake's "Family Matters", a diss track mainly aimed at Lamar.

"Meet the Grahams" is written in the form of a letter, with each verse addressed to members of Drake's family, including his son Adonis, his parents Sandra and Dennis Graham, his alleged daughter, and Drake himself. In the song, Lamar accuses Drake of lying about his family and his OVO Sound labelmates, of being a non-present father, signing sex offenders to his OVO Sound record label, and being a sexual predator himself. He also alleges that Drake is running a sex trafficking ring out of his Toronto mansion, saying it will soon be raided by law enforcement.

== Background ==
Drake, born Aubrey Drake Graham, has an immediate family including his parents, Sandra and Dennis Graham, and Adonis, Drake's son with model Sophie Brussaux. Adonis was initially kept from the public eye but was confirmed by Drake after rapper Pusha T revealed his existence on the 2018 diss track "The Story of Adidon". The feud between Drake and Lamar, although long ongoing since the early 2010s, rose to new heights in mid-2024, with Lamar attacking Drake's persona and skill with his verse on the song "Like That". Drake followed up to Lamar's verse and other diss tracks by other artists such as Rick Ross, Future, and The Weeknd with his own diss track, "Push Ups". In response, Lamar released "Euphoria”. The same week, he released another diss track, "6:16 in LA", claiming to have moles in Drake's label OVO Sound. Drake responded the same day with the track "Family Matters" in which he accused Lamar of domestic violence against longtime partner Whitney Alford. 52 minutes later, Lamar released "Meet the Grahams".

== Composition ==
Produced by the Alchemist, "Meet the Grahams", unlike Lamar's previous responses, takes on an unsettling, haunting atmosphere, with an eerie piano-driven beat, sampled from Timothy Carpenter & Triunity's "I Want To Make It", accompanying critical lyrics accusing Drake of a number of wrongdoings including parental negligence, sexual exploitation, sexual grooming, sex trafficking, and another incident of child abandonment.

"Meet the Grahams"
A 30-second sample of "Meet the Grahams", where Lamar condemns Drake's parents for how they raised them, as well as revealing multiple accusations of Drake.

The track's lyrics take the form of a letter with multiple verses addressed at members of Drake's family. The first verse is addressed to Drake's son Adonis, the second is addressed to Dennis and Sandra "Sandi" Graham, both of Drake's parents, the third is addressed to Drake's alleged daughter, and the last verse is addressed to Drake himself. In the song, Lamar alleges that Drake has a secret child, a daughter, accuses Drake of fathering further children aside from his alleged daughter, states that Drake has sex offenders on his record label OVO Sound, and calls him a sexual predator. Lamar also mentions that Drake is allegedly running a sex trafficking ring out of his Toronto mansion and states that his mansion known as "The Embassy" will be raided by law enforcement because of this, directly alluding to rapper Sean "Diddy" Combs' estate being raided amid his sexual abuse allegations. Lamar also compares Drake's actions to those of former film producer and convicted sex offender Harvey Weinstein. Lamar, in the final section of the track addressing Drake, addresses the confusion that came out of the track releasing within an hour of Drake's "Family Matters" with the lines "Dear Aubrey / I know you're probably thinkin' I wanted to crash your party / But truthfully, I don't have a hatin' bone in my body / There's supposed to be a good exhibition within the game / But you fucked up the moment you called out my family's name".

== Cover art ==
The cover art used in the original YouTube release shows an uncropped version of the photo that accompanied Lamar's previous song, "6:16 in LA". In addition to the glove, it shows a shirt, jewelry receipts, a visit card and three prescription medicines with the name "Aubrey Graham" (Drake's real name) on them, later revealed to be one for Ozempic, one for Adderall, and one for Zolpidem. According to DJ Akademiks, these items were stolen from a suitcase belonging to Drake's father, Dennis Graham. A week later, an unknown X/Twitter user posted a video playing the song on a Panasonic Toughbook and showing the original photo items hanging at a balcony, requiring Drake and Akademiks to retract their theft accusation.

The song was released to streaming platforms the next day with the artwork being replaced with a black square, possibly due to Spotify and Apple Music rules about using someone's private belongings without permission from the owner.

== Credits and personnel ==
- Kendrick Lamar – vocals, songwriting
- The Alchemist – production
- Nicolas De Porcel – mastering
- Johnathan Turner – mixing
- Ray Charles Brown Jr. – engineering

== Charts ==
=== Weekly charts ===
Weekly chart performance for "Meet the Grahams"
Chart (2024)	Peak position
Australia (ARIA)	42
Australia Hip Hop/R&B (ARIA)	10
Canada Hot 100 (Billboard)	16
Global 200 (Billboard)	17
Ireland (IRMA)	26
Lithuania (AGATA)	26
MENA (IFPI)	17
New Zealand (Recorded Music NZ)	22
Portugal (AFP)	54
South Africa (Billboard)	19
Sweden (Sverigetopplistan)	93
Switzerland (Schweizer Hitparade)	68
UK Singles (Official Charts)	28
UK Hip Hop/R&B (Official Charts)	5
US Billboard Hot 100	12
US Hot R&B/Hip-Hop Songs (Billboard)	6

=== Year-end charts ===
2024 year-end chart performance for "Meet the Grahams"
Chart (2024)	Position
US Hot R&B/Hip-Hop Songs (Billboard)	83

== Certifications ==
Certifications for "Meet the Grahams"
Region	Certification	Certified units/sales
Australia (ARIA)	Gold	35,000^{‡}
Brazil (Pro-Música Brasil)	Gold	20,000^{‡}
^{‡} Sales+streaming figures based on certification alone.

== See also ==
- List of notable diss tracks
