= Honorable C.N.O.T.E. production discography =

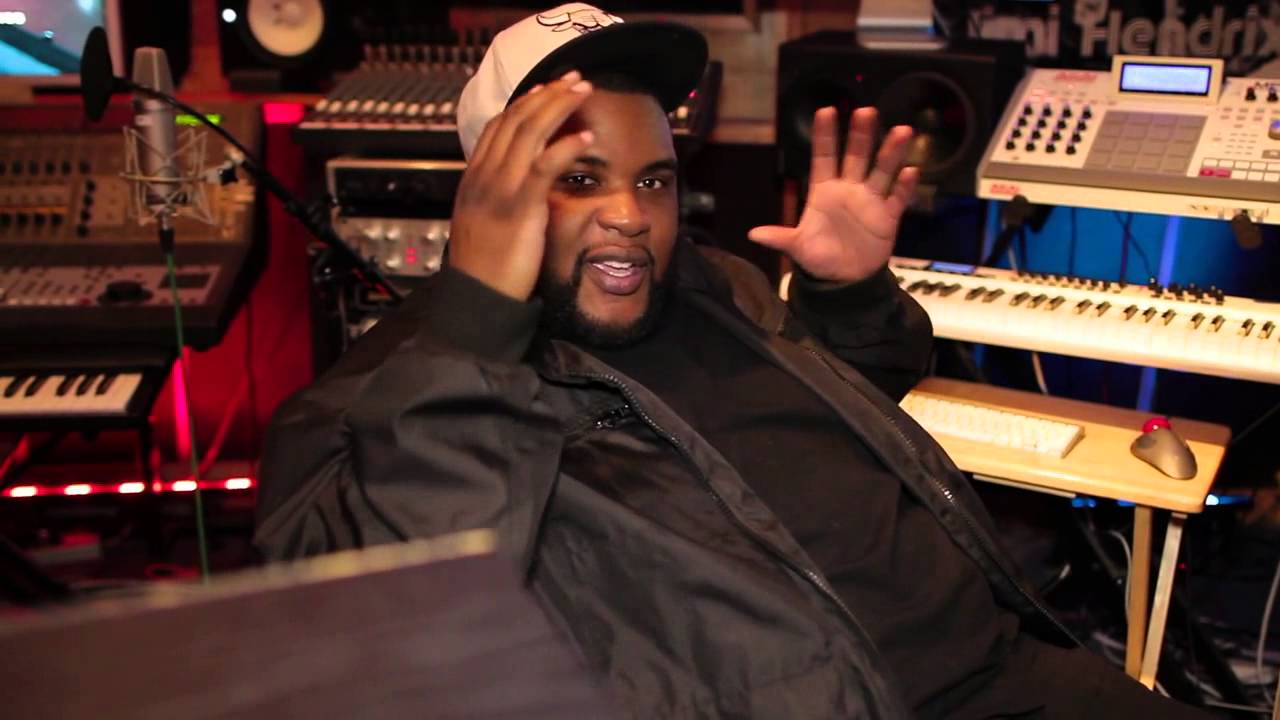
Honorable C.N.O.T.E. in 2013

The following is a discography of production by American record producer Honorable C.N.O.T.E.. He has over 7,000 total album placements.

== Charted songs ==
Title	Year	Peak chart positions			Album
Title	Year	US	US R&B/HH	CAN	Album
"I Don't Know" (Meek Mill featuring Paloma Ford)	2014	— (Note: "I Don't Know" did not enter the Billboard Hot 100, but peaked at number 16 on the Bubbling Under Hot 100 chart.)	35		—N/a
"New Level" (ASAP Ferg featuring Future)	2015	90	30	—	Always Strive and Prosper
"Way Back" (Travis Scott)	2016	— (Note: "Way Back" did not enter the Billboard Hot 100, but peaked at number 19 on the Bubbling Under Hot 100 Singles chart.)	50	—	Birds in the Trap Sing McKnight
"20 Min" (Lil Uzi Vert)	2017	— (Note: "20 Min" did not enter the Billboard Hot 100, but peaked at number 17 on the Bubbling Under Hot 100 Singles chart.)	—	—	Luv Is Rage 2
"Dark Knight Dummo" (Trippie Redd featuring Travis Scott)	2017	72	29	93	Life's a Trip
"Supastars" (Migos)	2018	53	27	51	Culture II
"White Sand" (Migos featuring Travis Scott, Ty Dolla Sign, and Big Sean)	2018	64	31	58	Culture II
"Solitaire" (Gucci Mane featuring Migos and Lil Yachty)	2018	— (Note: "Solitaire" did not enter the Billboard Hot 100, but peaked at number 8 on the Bubbling Under Hot 100 Singles chart.)	—	—	Evil Genius

== 2007 ==
=== Birdman – 5 * Stunna ===
- 18. "So Tired" (featuring Lil Wayne)

=== Flo Rida – Mail on Sunday ===
- 01. "American Superstar" (featuring Lil Wayne)
- 12. "Don't Know How to Act" (featuring Yung Joc)

=== 2 Pistols – Death Before Dishonor ===
- 02. "Death Before Dishonor"
- 04. "Been Throwin' Money"

== 2009 ==
=== Mack 10 – Soft White ===
- 11. "Dedication (To the Pen)"

=== Eminem – Relapse 2 ===
- 00. "Hit Me with Your Best Shot" (featuring D12)

== 2010 ==
=== B.o.B – B.o.B Presents: The Adventures of Bobby Ray ===
- 14. "I See Ya" (American iTunes deluxe edition bonus track / Target edition bonus track)

=== Bizarre – Friday Night at St. Andrews ===
- 05. "Pussy" (featuring Fiona Simone and KB)
- 10. "Believer" (featuring Tech N9ne and Nate Walka)
- 16. "Warning" (featuring Bonecrusher and Anamul House)

== 2011 ==
=== Z-Ro – Meth ===
- 01. "Real or Fake"

== 2012 ==
=== Coke Boys – Coke Boys 3 ===
- 15. "Dirty Money" (French Montana featuring L.E.P. Bogus Boyz)

=== Future – Pluto ===
- 12. "Long Live the Pimp" (featuring Trae tha Truth)

=== Waka Flocka Flame – Triple F Life: Friends, Fans & Family ===
- 08. "Candy Paint & Gold Teeth" (featuring Bun B and Ludacris; produced with Redwine)
- 19. "Barry Bonds" (featuring ASAP and P Smurf)

=== Gucci Mane – Trap God ===
- 19. "I Fuck with That" (produced with Mike Will Made It and Southside)

== 2013 ==
=== Gucci Mane – Trap God 2 ===
- 07. "Bob Marley"
- 23. "Supposed 2" (produced with Zaytoven)

=== Gucci Mane – World War 3:Lean ===
- 00. "Servin Lean" (Peewee Longway)
- 00. "Extacy Pill" (Young Thug)

=== Gucci Mane – Trap House III ===
- 03. "Use Me" (featuring 2 Chainz)
- 05. "Hell Yes"
- 06. "I Heard" (featuring Rich Homie Quan; produced with Lex Luger)
- 15. "Chasen Paper" (featuring Rich Homie Quan and Young Thug)
- 16. "Off the Leash" (featuring PeeWee Longway and Young Thug)

=== 2 Chainz – B.O.A.T.S. II: Me Time ===
- 07. "Netflix" (featuring Fergie; produced with Diplo and DJA)
- 10. "Beautiful Pain" (featuring Lloyd and Mase)

=== Yo Gotti – I Am ===
- 09. "Die a Real Nigga"

=== Lil Bibby – Free Crack ===
- 03. "Change"

=== E-40 – The Block Brochure: Welcome to the Soil 6 ===
- 05. "Pablo" (featuring Gucci Mane and Trinidad James)

=== Lil B – 05 Fuck Em ===
- 02. "Welcome to 05"

=== Gucci Mane – The State vs. Radric Davis II: The Caged Bird Sings ===
- 06. "Double"
- 09. "Too Many"
- 17. "Threw with That Shit"

== 2014 ==
=== Meek Mill – "I Don't Know" ===
- 01. "I Don't Know" (featuring Paloma Ford; produced with CyFyre)

=== G Herbo – Welcome to Fazoland ===
- 16. "All I Got" (featuring Lil Bibby)

=== Gucci Mane – Trap House 4 ===
- 06. "Drugs Like You"
- 19. "Outro"

=== Migos – No Label 2 ===
- 15. "Freak No More"

=== Kevin Gates – By Any Means ===
- 09. "Bet I'm on It" (featuring 2 Chainz)

=== Gucci Mane – Trap God 3 ===
- 07. "Swole Pocket Shawty"
- 10. "Start Pimpin'" (featuring Chief Keef)
- 11. "Finger Waves"

=== Gucci Mane – The Oddfather ===
- 03. "Kick Door" (featuring OJ da Juiceman; produced with C4)

=== Lil Bibby – Free Crack 2 ===
- 15. "Tomorrow"

=== Gucci Mane – East Atlanta Santa ===
- 12. "Riding Dirty" (produced with Metro Boomin and Doughboy Beatz)

== 2015 ==
=== Gucci Mane – 1017 Mafia: Incarcerated ===
- 08. "Story" (featuring Young Dolph)

=== Rae Sremmurd – SremmLife ===
- 11. "Safe Sex Pay Checks"

=== Ne-Yo – Non-Fiction ===
- 20. "Worth It" (produced with Jesse "Corporal" Wilson and Chucky Thompson)

=== G-Unit – The Beast Is G Unit ===
- 02. "I'm Grown"

=== Gucci Mane – Trap House 5 ===
- 13. "Constantly" (featuring Chief Keef)

=== ASAP Rocky – At. Long. Last. ASAP ===
- 15. "M'$" (featuring Lil Wayne; produced with Mike Dean)

=== Migos – Yung Rich Nation ===
- 01. "Memoirs"
- 02. "Dab Daddy"
- 04. "Spray the Champagne" (produced with Murda Beatz)
- 05. "Street Nigga Sacrifice"
- 06. "Highway 85"
- 13. "Trap Funk"

=== K Camp – Only Way Is Up ===
- 03. "Yellow Brick Road" (produced with Big Fruit)
- 11. "Rolling" (featuring Snoop Dogg)

=== Pusha T – King Push – Darkest Before Dawn: The Prelude ===
- 04. "Crutches, Crosses, Caskets" (produced with Puff Daddy, Mario Winans, Sean C & LV, and Yung Dev)

== 2016 ==
=== Yo Gotti – The Art of Hustle ===
- 13. "Hunnid" (featuring Pusha T)
- 14. "Luv Deez Hoes" (featuring 2 Chainz)

=== 2 Chainz – ColleGrove ===
- 02. "Smell Like Money" (featuring Lil Wayne)

=== ASAP Ferg – Always Strive and Prosper ===
- 07. "New Level" (featuring Future)

=== Belly – Another Day in Paradise ===
- 04. "Exotic" (featuring Waka Flocka Flame)

=== DJ Drama – Quality Street Music 2 ===
- 07. "Onyx" (featuring Ty Dolla Sign, Trey Songz, and August Alsina)
- 09. "Back and Forth" (featuring Skeme and Yakki Divioshi)

=== Travis Scott – Birds in the Trap Sing McKnight ===
- 02. "Way Back" (produced with Hit-Boy, Cashmere Cat, Rogét Chahayed, and Mike Dean)

=== Gucci Mane – Woptober ===
- 04. "Money Machine" (featuring Rick Ross)

=== Migos ===
- "Dat Way" (featuring Rich the Kid)

=== Rae Sremmurd – Adult Swim Singles Program 2016 ===
- 20. "Ball Out the Lot" (featuring Bobo Swae and Swae Lee)

=== ASAP Ferg – "New Level" ===
- 01. "New Level (Remix)" (featuring Future, ASAP Rocky, and Lil Uzi Vert)

=== Meek Mill – DC4 ===
- 11 "Way Up" (featuring Tracy T)

=== Gucci Mane ===
- 01. "Floor Seats" (featuring Quavo)

=== Lil Uzi Vert and Gucci Mane – 1017 vs. The World ===
- 01. "Changed My Phone"
- 02. "Today!!"

== 2017 ==
=== Kodak Black – Painting Pictures ===
- 16. "Feeling Like" (featuring Jeezy) (produced with Derelle Rideout)

=== Zaytoven ===
- 00. "East Atlanta Day" (featuring Gucci Mane and 21 Savage) (produced with Zaytoven)

=== Philthy Rich ===
- 00. "Water Leak" (featuring Lil Uzi Vert, Offset and Sauce Walka)

=== Meek Mill – Wins & Losses ===
- 12 "Glow Up"

=== Trippie Redd – Life's a Trip ===
- "Dark Knight Dummo" (featuring Travis Scott)

=== Quality Control – Control the Streets, Volume 1 ===
- 13. "The Load" (featuring Gucci Mane, Lil Baby & Marlo)
- 18. "Holiday" (featuring Lil Yachty & Quavo) (produced with Supah Mario)

== 2018 ==
=== Migos – Culture II ===
- 02. "Supastars" (produced with Buddah Bless, DJ Durel and Quavo)

=== Gucci Mane, Migos, Lil Yachty ===
- 00. "Solitaire"

=== Christina Aguilera – Liberation ===
- 12. "Accelerate" (featuring Ty Dolla Sign and 2 Chainz)

=== Rob Vicious and Shoreline Mafia - Shoreline Mafia Presents Rob Vicious: Traplantic ===
- 01. "C Notes" (featuring Fenix Flexin and OhGeesy)

=== Scarlxrd ===
- 00 "MAD MAN."

=== Trippie Redd ===
- "Ghost Busters" (featuring Quavo, XXXTentacion, Ski Mask the Slump God)

=== Jack Harlow – Loose ===
- 04. "Slide for Me"

== 2019 ==
=== Jack Harlow – Confetti ===
- 04. "Sunday Night"

== 2020 ==
=== 21 Savage and Metro Boomin – Savage Mode II ===
- 03. "Glock in My Lap" (produced with Metro Boomin and Southside)

== 2022 ==
=== Metro Boomin and Future – Heroes & Villains ===
- 03. "Too Many Nights" (featuring Don Toliver)

== 2023 ==
=== Lecrae – Church Clothes 4: Dry Clean Only ===
- 14. "They Ain't Know"

=== Metro Boomin – Spider-Man: Across the Spider-Verse ===
- 12. "Givin' Up (Not the One)" (featuring 21 Savage, Don Toliver and 2 Chainz)

== 2024 ==
=== Kid Cudi – Insano ===
- 03. "Keep Bouncin'"

=== Metro Boomin and Future – We Still Don't Trust You ===
- 24. "Show of Hands" (featuring Kuremino; featuring Flaco G)

=== Megan Thee Stallion – Megan ===
- 14. "Down Stairs DJ"

=== Vegas Jones – PRIMETIME ===
- 5. "MVP" featuring Kuremino, Flaco G
