= The Gentlemen's Club =

2026 studio album by YG

Studio album by YG
- Released: June 19, 2026
- Genre: West Coast hip-hop
- Length: 54:34
- Labels: 4Hunnid; 10K Projects
- Producers: Bandz; Damn James; Dowave; Drew80HD; DTP; Is That Trey; Jay Versace; Kofo; Kwak Z; Low the Great; Max; Moo Latte; Olmo; Pusha Kam; Rayo; Roads; Smoke; Terrific; Ty Dolla Sign; Young TN

YG chronology
Just Re'd Up 3 (2024)	The Gentlemen's Club (2026)

Singles from The Gentlemen's Club
- 1. "Hollywood" Released: May 22, 2025; 2. "Gang Bizness" Released: May 29, 2026; 3. "Insecure" Released: June 12, 2026

The Gentlemen's Club is the seventh studio album by the American rapper YG. It was released on June 19, 2026, through 4Hunnid Records under exclusive license to 10K Projects. The album contains 15 tracks and features guest appearances from Pusha T, Isaiah Falls, Odeal, Sasha Keable, Tyler, the Creator, Shoreline Mafia, PayGotti, Ogi, JID, Ab-Soul, and Buddy.

YG announced the album in May 2026, alongside a new label partnership with 10K Projects. In interviews and criticism around the album, writers characterized it as a self-examining project built around image, self-worth, and narrative rap. Reviews highlighted the album's self-examination and concept, while several writers discussed "Tiffany" as a difficult or controversial story song about trans-panic violence.

== Background and release ==
On May 27, 2026, YG announced The Gentlemen's Club for release on June 19 and entered a label partnership with 10K Projects for the album. The album was released as a 15-track project on June 19, 2026, with a total running time of 54 minutes and 34 seconds.

Speaking to GQ after a live performance of the album at the Roxy Theatre in West Hollywood, YG said that he had not previously performed one of his albums from front to back. GQ's Frazier Tharpe wrote that the album had been in development for two years, which YG described as the longest he had worked on a project. The album includes "Hollywood", a collaboration with Shoreline Mafia released as a single on May 22, 2025; "Gang Bizness", with PayGotti, released as a single on May 29, 2026; and "Insecure", with JID and Ab-Soul, released as a single on June 12, 2026.

YG is scheduled to embark on the North American "The Gentlemen's Club Tour" in support of the album, beginning in Boston on September 10, 2026 and concluding in Honolulu on November 7, 2026. Mozzy, Kalan.FrFr, Chef Boy, and Natalie Nunn will open for the tour.

== Music and themes ==
Tharpe characterized The Gentlemen's Club as an album about YG's public image, self-worth, and insecurities, with songs that also preserve his club-oriented rap style. Mosi Reeves of Rolling Stone wrote that the album treats the title less as a strip-club reference than as an imagined space where men speak about uncomfortable subjects, and described it as a return to narrative writing within YG's aggressive persona. In Beats per Minute, Chase McMullen wrote that the album uses the idea of the club as a concept, including linked songs with a fictional hitman premise in which YG's target is a version of himself.

Several reviews singled out "Tiffany", a story song about a man who becomes violent after learning that the woman he brought home is transgender. Reeves compared the song's attempt at empathy to Kendrick Lamar's "Auntie Diaries", while McMullen described it as ambitious but unsuccessful in its handling of transphobia. Writing for Them, Quispe López reported that trans creators criticized the song for repeating narratives associated with the trans-panic myth, while noting that the song is a fictional story rather than an autobiographical account.

== Critical reception ==
Professional ratings
Review scores
Source	Rating
Beats per Minute	70%
Rolling Stone	3.5/5 stars

Tharpe wrote in GQ that The Gentlemen's Club was YG's strongest album since My Krazy Life (2014), emphasizing its self-critical framing and his performance of the album in a black-tie setting. Reeves, reviewing the album for Rolling Stone, said it showed a renewed focus on narrative and highlighted "We Know the Truth" and "Hollywood" as examples of YG's strengths, while also describing parts of the album as odd and difficult.

McMullen gave the album a score of 70% in Beats per Minute. He wrote that YG sounded focused and serious across the album, but considered some of its conceptual swings uneven, particularly "Tiffany". López's Them article focused on "Tiffany" and reported criticism from transgender people including Kat Blaque, who argued that the song repeated stereotypes used to justify violence against trans women.

== Track listing ==
The Gentlemen's Club track listing
No.	Title	Writer(s)	Producer(s)	Length
1.	"Intro"	Keenon Jackson; Isaiah Falls; Denis Raab; Brian Massaka; Aaron Cheung; Niko Oroc; William Mandell	DTP; Moo Latte; Aaron Paris^{[a]}; Oroc^{[a]}; Zev^{[a]}	1:59
2.	"OMG" (featuring Pusha T)	Jackson; Terrence Thornton; VonTrey Taylor; DeAngelo Smith	Is That Trey; Low the Great	2:26
3.	"Kudos"	Jackson; Keith Sweet II; Rafael Bautista; Isaiah Libeau; Cheung; Oroc; Mandell; Marshall Mathers; Andre Young; Melvin Bradford	Smoke; Aaron Paris^{[a]}; Oroc^{[a]}; Zev^{[a]}	2:23
4.	"Hitman"	Jackson; Sweet; Bautista; Raab; Massaka	DTP; Moo Latte	4:27
5.	"Simon Says" (featuring Isaiah Falls, Odeal, and Sasha Keable)	Jackson; Falls; Hillary Udanoh; Sasha Keable; Benson Bazilme; Gabriel Blizman; Matthew Cristobol; Philip Kavuma; Olmo Zucca; Rayan Goufar; Cheung; Oroc; Mandell; Dowave	Rayo; Olmo; Dowave; Falls^{[a]}; Aaron Paris^{[a]}; Oroc^{[a]}; Zev^{[a]}	4:20
6.	"On the Low" (featuring Tyler, the Creator)	Jackson; Tyler Okonma; Tyrone Griffin Jr.	Ty Dolla Sign	3:03
7.	"We Know the Truth"	Jackson; Raab	DTP	3:37
8.	"Hollywood" (featuring Shoreline Mafia)	Jackson; Alejandro Carranza; Fenix Rypinski; Griffin; James Royo; Kevin McCord; Norman Lewis	Ty Dolla Sign; Damn James	3:00
9.	"Gang Bizness" (featuring PayGotti)	Jackson; Benjamin Thompson; Chris Terry; Deandre Wheelwright; Randy Holmes	Bandz; Terrific; Pusha Kam; Roads	2:47
10.	"Ready to Die (Hitman Response)"	Jackson; Raab	DTP	3:52
11.	"Writing My Wrongs" (featuring Ogi)	Jackson; Ogi Ifediora; Sweet; Bautista; Libeau; Cheung; Oroc; Mandell	Smoke; Aaron Paris^{[a]}; Oroc^{[a]}; Zev^{[a]}	3:38
12.	"Dinner Dates & Heart Breaks"	Jackson; Raab; Andrew Dineen; Kevin Ekofo; Thanush Perinpanesan	DTP; Drew80HD; Kofo; Young TN	4:02
13.	"Tiffany"	Jackson; Griffin; Royo; Seongho Kwak	Ty Dolla Sign; Damn James; Kwak Z	6:52
14.	"Insecure" (featuring JID and Ab-Soul)	Jackson; Destin Route; Herbert Stevens; Raab	DTP	4:16
15.	"Mid Life Crisis" (featuring Buddy)	Jackson; Simmie Sims; Sweet; Jahlil Gunter; Max Théodore	Jay Versace; Max	3:46
Total length:				54:34

=== Note ===
- ^{^[a]} signifies an additional producer

== Personnel ==
Credits are adapted from Tidal.

- YG – vocals
- Niko Oroc – programming (tracks 1, 3, 5, 11); guitar, keyboards, synthesizer (3, 5, 11)
- William "Zev" Mandell – programming (1, 3, 5, 11); guitar, keyboards, synthesizer (3, 5, 11)
- Is That Trey – programming (1)
- Low the Great – programming (1)
- Pusha T – vocals (2)
- DTP – programming (4, 7, 10, 12, 14)
- Moo Latte – programming (4)
- Isaiah Falls – vocals (5)
- Odeal – vocals (5)
- Sasha Keable – vocals (5)
- Ty Dolla Sign – programming (6, 8, 13)
- Tyler, the Creator – vocals (6)
- Damn James – programming (8)
- Shoreline Mafia – vocals (8)
- PayGotti – vocals (9)
- Bandz – programming (9)
- Pusha Kam – programming (9)
- Roads – programming (9)
- Terrific – programming (9)
- Ogi – vocals (11)
- Drew80HD – programming (12)
- Kofo – programming (12)
- Young TN – programming (12)
- Kwak Z – programming (13)
- James Royo – programming (13)
- JID – vocals (14)
- Ab-Soul – vocals (14)
- Jay Versace – programming (15)
- Max – programming (15)
- Buddy – vocals (15)
