= OTXmas =

Mixtape by Shoreline Mafia
- Released: December 7, 2018
- Genre: Hip-hop
- Length: 21:27
- Label: Atlantic
- Producers: AceTheFace; Bruce24k; New Lane Ant; Ron-Ron The Producer; Slade Da Monsta

Shoreline Mafia chronology
Shoreline Mafia Presents Rob Vicious: Traplantic (2018)	OTXmas (2018)	Party Pack Vol. 2 (2019)

Singles from OTXmas
- 1. "Homicide" Released: October 5, 2018; 2. "Ride Around" Released: October 14, 2018

OTXmas is a holiday-themed mixtape by American Los Angeles-based hip-hop quartet Shoreline Mafia. It was released on December 7, 2018, via Atlantic Records, and received positive reviews from critics.

== Background ==
The mixtape was supported by two singles and three music videos. The first music video, for the single "Ride Around", was released on November 16, 2018. The music video features Master Kato, the only Shoreline Mafia rapper to appear on "Ride Around". The second music video, for the single "Homicide", was released on December 5, 2018. BandGang Lonnie Bands makes a guest appearance on the song, in addition to appearing in the music video.

The third music video, for the song "Moving Work", was released on December 14, 2018. "Moving Work" features Fenix Flexin, OhGeesy, and Rob Vicious on the song and in the music video. The fourth music video, for the song "Molly Water", was released on January 28, 2019. The fifth and final music video, for the song "Pressure", was released on February 19, 2019.

== Track listing ==
No.	Title	Writer(s)	Producer(s)	Length
1.	"Bathing Ape"	Angelo Johnson; Alejandro Carranza; Fenix Rypinski; Laron Robinson; Robert Magee II	AceTheFace; Ron-Ron The Producer	3:02
2.	"Occupied"	Magee II; Marcus Slade; Rypinski	Slade Da Monsta	2:27
3.	"Moving Work"	Anthony Delagarza; Carranza; Louis Elveus; Magee II; Rypinski	New Lane Ant	2:43
4.	"Pressure"	Bruce Johnson; Carranza; Rypinski	Bruce24k	2:44
5.	"Ride Around"	Malik Carson; Robinson	Ron-Ron The Producer	2:35
6.	"Homicide" (featuring BandGang Lonnie Bands)	Carranza; Delante Landrum; Robinson	Ron-Ron The Producer	2:25
7.	"Pistol Love"	Angelo Johnson; Magee II; Robinson; Rypinski	AceTheFace; Ron-Ron The Producer	2:32
8.	"Molly Water"	Carranza; Robinson; Rypinski	Ron-Ron The Producer	2:56
Total length:				21:27

== Appearances ==
The following table lists the number of appearances on the mixtape by each member of Shoreline Mafia:

Artist	Notes
OhGeesy	performs on 5 tracks
Fenix Flexin	performs on 5 tracks
Rob Vicious	performs on 3 tracks
Master Kato	performs on 1 track
