= Breakthrough (mixtape) =

Mixtape by Rob Vicious
- Released: May 1, 2020
- Recorded: 2019
- Genre: Hip-hop
- Length: 31:35
- Label: Atlantic
- Producers: BeatsAintFree JG; Bruce24k; Clay Priskorn; DJ Paul; Funke; Hurtboy AG; K Wils; LeanYSL; ManOhManFoster; Yung Henny

Rob Vicious chronology
Shoreline Mafia Presents Rob Vicious: Traplantic (2018)	Breakthrough (2020)	2 Vicious (2021)

Singles from Breakthrough
- 1. "Rackae, Pt. 2" Released: August 1, 2019; 2. "L3V3L" Released: May 1, 2020

Breakthrough is the debut solo mixtape by American Los Angeles-based rapper Rob Vicious. The mixtape was released three weeks after Shoreline Mafia's disbandment was publicly announced, becoming Rob's first full-length mixtape as a solo artist. Breakthrough was released on May 1, 2020, via Atlantic Records. It features two guest appearances from fellow Shoreline Mafia rapper Fenix Flexin, and California-based rapper NFant.

== Background ==
Three weeks before the mixtape's release, the disbandment of hip-hop quartet Shoreline Mafia was announced by Fenix Flexin, signalling the start of Rob's solo career. It was later revealed that Shoreline Mafia had split up behind the scenes in late 2018. Rob's final album with Shoreline Mafia, Mafia Bidness, was released in July 2020, and the deluxe edition was released in November 2020.

Rob described how the group's issues and disbandment affected the mixtape and his personal philosophy:

I learned you’ve got to do shit for yourself. I was tired of fucking holding things back. I decided to let that shit go. When I finally did, I took a more mature approach to my life and my music.

Rob explained the inspiration for the mixtape's title and lyrical content in an interview:

On some honest shit, I was talking to my mom and explaining what I was going through. She kept saying, ‘It’s alright. It’s a breakthrough’. I replayed that through my head for like three weeks. It explains everything perfectly. When you listen to this, it sounds like breaking through some shit, fighting demons, and combating pain from every angle—personal things, family, and friends. I honestly didn’t know what the fuck to do. I had to fight it, stick to the music, and talk about it. In a sense, it brought me some type of comfort.

According to Rob Vicious, the mixtape was intended to shed light on negative experiences, saying that "I wanted to make you feel exactly like I was feeling. I was going through misery in my life, so I had to sing, because it felt better."

== Recording and production ==
In an interview, Rob explains that Breakthrough is "the product of a year’s worth of tireless recording".

A press release from Atlantic Records describes the meticulous recording process:

Throughout 2019, he went on a creative tear. Holed up in a Venice Beach, CA recording studio, he put down nearly one-hundred records, building a base for his debut album, Breakthrough. He cut deeper than ever before, translating struggle into melody and singing with undeniable intensity at the same time.

Rob describes his introspective rapping style and flow on the mixtape, and how it differs from his usual style:

The delivery has got more emotion and pain in it. The sound is really open. I wanted to see how far I could take it, and I took that shit pretty far.

The mixtape's lyrical content and overall style were a major shift from Rob's usual work. Rob's aggressive and braggadocious style evolved, with his solo music being significantly more mellow and introspective:

Breakthrough fuses every side of Rob’s signature style. The bars hit as hard as they always have, but he also embraces a heightened melodic delivery. As a whole, the project lives up to its title, mirroring his artistic and personal evolution. By taking the reins, he delivers the same catharsis and comfort for listeners everywhere on Breakthrough and more music to come.

== Music ==
The most popular track on the mixtape is "Get A Bag", featuring a verse from fellow Shoreline Mafia rapper Fenix Flexin. The beat for "Get A Bag" was created by Bruce24k, a veteran West Coast producer who has worked extensively with Rob Vicious and Shoreline Mafia. In a positive review, Lupe Llernas of Home Grown Radio remarked that Rob was "balancing outlandish flexes on tracks like the club-ready “Get A Bag”.

One of the more introspective and vulnerable tracks on the album, "Mental Warfare" was produced by a team of four beatmakers, including Al B Smoov, Clay Priskorn, Hurtboy AG, and ManOhManFoster. Llernas noted that "with deep introspection—he marvels at how far he’s come on “Mental Warfare”.

On the fast-paced track "Forreal", Rob "self-medicates to escape his darkest thoughts" according to a favorable review in The Hype Magazine. "Forreal" was produced by Los Angeles-based producers Funke, Hurtboy AG, and ManOhManFoster.

The final songs on the mixtape are relatively slow-paced and mellow, with Llernas remarking that Rob 'searches for a way forward on the closing trio “Wat U Thinking,” “Angeles vs. Demons,” and "Overdose."'

=== Singles and music videos ===
The mixtape was supported by two singles and three music videos. The lead single, "Rackae Pt. 2", was released as a SoundCloud-exclusive track on August 1, 2019, before being released on streaming services with the rest of the mixtape. It serves as a sequel to the 2018 song "LA Flocker/Rackae", which was released on Rob's previous mixtape, the Shoreline Mafia-backed Traplantic.

The second single, "L3V3L", was produced by Three 6 Mafia rapper DJ Paul. It was released as the intro track on May 1, 2020, the same day Breakthrough was released. An accompanying music video was released alongside the mixtape. According to a positive review for Audible Treats magazine, the music video depicts Rob as he "shakes his dreads in a neon-lit room, stacking his blue hundreds and threatening to go ape on anyone who dares challenge him." In the same review, "L3V3L" was described as "slicing through a doom-y, bass-boosted instrumental with triplet flows and piercing auto-tune, Rob Vicious asserts his rap supremacy, daring his rivals to get on his unreachable level." In an interview with HipHopDX, Rob explained his recording process for the song:

It took me a year to come up with something to that beat. He [DJ Paul] made that for me, and it was in my email for a year. I was in a Lyft, and I played the beat, and the first thing that came to me was the opening bar. I went to the studio and laid it, and here we are now.

The second music video, for the song "Wat It Do", was released on May 13, 2020. In a positive review for Earmilk magazine, Brianna Lawson describes "Wat It Do" as "a subsonic bass-packed cut from Vicious's Breakthrough mixtape." She remarks that the song is "pure chaos", and that the production is "reminiscent of Three Six Mafia's horrorcore, high-pitched production." Lawson described the music video as "bringing his words to life, the video includes Vicious in an eerie, red room, mobbing with the guys. Between high-speed animations and trippy added effects, "Wat It Do" becomes an out of control function. Don't read too much into the video, instead, get lost in this menacing mob anthem."

The third music video, for the song "Terminal V (Terminal 5)", was released on June 17, 2020, and it was directed by John Truman. Nancy Lu of Fault magazine reacted positively to "Terminal V", claiming that "the song radiates with raw energy and finds Rob experimenting with auto-tune and falsetto to mimic the frenzied state-of-mind of an abrupt comedown." She describes the music video, saying that "Rob stands guard over the wreckage of a plane crash, wielding a double-barrel shotgun as he works through his demons."

Explaining his decision to work with California-based filmmaker John Truman on the "Terminal V" music video, Rob said:

I chose John Truman as the director for “Terminal V” because he’s one of the few directors I trust with my vision. The process of shooting it was easy, natural, and comfortable, though I was stepping into a whole new realm as far as look and sound.

== Critical reception ==
Breakthrough was met with generally favorable reviews. In a short review for Home Grown Radio, journalist Lupe Llernas reacted positively to the mixtape, describing it as "deeply personal and immersive". She described Rob himself as "a connoisseur of West coast trap jams" and "an invaluable piece of rap collective Shoreline Mafia".

A positive review in The Hype Magazine describes the transition of Rob's music style on the mixtape:

He made his name with party-positive bangers like the platinum-selling “Bands,” but Rob Vicious‘s introspective new material radiates a bleary-eyed intensity.

In a positive review for Earmilk magazine, Brianna Lawson was quoted as saying:

Breakthrough is a 13-track project packed with his hardest and most personal cuts. Choosing from over 100 demos to fit into the new tape, it's hard to ignore Vicious's passion for the game. Including features from his Shoreline Mafia partner, Fenix Flexin and L.A rapper, Nfant, Vicious teases catchy cuts, and rough melodies.

== Track listing ==
No.	Title	Writer(s)	Producer(s)	Length
1.	"L3V3L"	Robert Magee II	DJ Paul	2:29
2.	"Invasion"	Magee II	LeanYSL	2:10
3.	"Get A Bag" (featuring Fenix Flexin)	Fenix Rypinski; Magee II	Bruce24k	2:57
4.	"Wat It Do"	Magee II	Hurtboy AG	1:59
5.	"Terminal V (Terminal 5)"	Magee II	Clay Priskorn; Hurtboy AG; ManOhManFoster	2:46
6.	"Mental Warfare"	Aaron Gilfenbain; Alec Tolkin; Clay Priskorn; Hurtboy AG; Magee II; Zachary Foster	Al B Smoov; Clay Priskorn; Hurtboy AG; ManOhManFoster	2:10
7.	"On One"	Magee II	Hurtboy AG	2:27
8.	"Period" (featuring Nfant)	Magee II	–	1:26
9.	"Rackae, Pt. 2"	Magee II	BeatsAintFree JG; Hurtboy AG; Yung Henny	4:07
10.	"Forreal"	Magee II	Funke; Hurtboy AG; ManOhManFoster	1:52
11.	"Wat U Thinkin"	Magee II	Hurtboy AG	2:14
12.	"Angels vs. Demons"	Magee II	Hurtboy AG; K Wils	2:31
13.	"Overdose"	Gilfenbain; Hurtboy AG; Jonathan Gabor; Magee II; Priskorn; Tolkin	Al B Smoov; BeatsAintFree JG; Clay Priskorn; Hurtboy AG	2:19
Total length:				31:35
