= ShorelineDoThatShit =

Mixtape by Shoreline Mafia
- Released: October 30, 2017 (independent release); May 4, 2018 (official release)
- Genre: Hip-hop
- Length: 49:02
- Label: Atlantic
- Producer: ACETHEFACE; Beat Boy; JoogSZN; Ron-Ron The Producer

Shoreline Mafia chronology
ShorelineDoThatShit (2017)	Shoreline Mafia Presents Rob Vicious: Traplantic (2018)

Singles from ShorelineDoThatShit
- 1. "Musty" Released: December 21, 2016; 2. "Bottle Service" Released: December 24, 2016; 3. "Nun Major" Released: October 30, 2017

ShorelineDoThatShit is the debut mixtape by American Los Angeles-based hip-hop quartet Shoreline Mafia. It was independently released on October 30, 2017. It was re-released on May 4, 2018, via Atlantic Records. Production was handled by Ron-Ron The Producer, ACETHEFACE, Beat Boy, and JoogSZN. It features guest appearances from the Stinc Team on two tracks.

== Release and promotion ==
The album was promoted by three singles: "Musty", "Bottle Service", and "Nun Major". The official music video for "Musty" was released on May 7, 2018, with the song being released almost a year and a half earlier on December 21, 2016. An earlier music video for "Musty" was released in 2017.

The album was re-released by Atlantic Records on May 4, 2018, with four additional tracks.

== Track listing ==
No.	Title	Writer(s)	Producer(s)	Length
1.	"Intro"	Alejandro Carranza; Fenix Rypinski	Ron-Ron The Producer	1:27
2.	"Serve A Boat"	Carranza; Rypinski; Malik Carson	ACETHEFACE; Ron-Ron The Producer	3:26
3.	"Whuss The Deal"	Carranza; Rypinski; LaRon Robinson	Ron-Ron The Producer	3:15
4.	"Power Rangers"	Robert Magee II; Carson	Beat Boy; Ron-Ron The Producer	2:55
5.	"Spaceship" (featuring Stinc Team)	Carranza; Rypinski; Magee II; Robinson; Jameon Dexter Davis; Devante Caldwell; Calvin Webb; Terrence Hackett	Beat Boy; JoogSZN; Ron-Ron The Producer	3:58
6.	"Pack Em"	Carranza; Rypinski	Ron-Ron The Producer	3:25
7.	"Dope House"	Carranza	ACETHEFACE	2:52
8.	"Straight Drop"	Carranza; Rypinski; Carson	Ron-Ron The Producer	3:25
9.	"Dirty"	Carranza; Rypinski; Magee II	Ron-Ron The Producer	3:40
10.	"Section"	Carranza; Rypinski; Magee II	Ron-Ron The Producer	2:43
11.	"Nun Major"	Carranza	Beat Boy; Ron-Ron The Producer	2:31
12.	"Poppin It" (featuring Stinc Team)	Carranza; Rypinski; Magee II; Davis; Caldwell	Beat Boy; Ron-Ron The Producer	4:40
Total length:				38:24

Re-release additional tracks
No.	Title	Writer(s)	Producer(s)	Length
13.	"Musty"	Carranza; Rypinski; Robinson	Ron-Ron The Producer	2:41
14.	"Bottle Service"	Carranza; Rypinski; Robinson	Ron-Ron The Producer	2:36
15.	"Bullshit"	Magee II	Beat Boy; Ron-Ron The Producer	2:56
16.	"Break A Bitch Bacc"	Carranza; Rypinski; Magee II	Beat Boy	2:24
Total length:				10:37

== Appearances ==
Artist	Notes
OhGeesy	performs on 14 tracks
Fenix Flexin	performs on 12 tracks
Rob Vicious	performs on 7 tracks
Master Kato	performs on 3 tracks

== Certifications ==
Region	Certification	Certified units/sales
United States (RIAA)	Gold	500,000^{‡}
^{‡} Sales+streaming figures based on certification alone.
