= Hollywood (YG and Shoreline Mafia song) =

2025 single by YG and Shoreline Mafia

Single by YG and Shoreline Mafia

from the album The Gentlemen's Club
- Released: May 23, 2025
- Genre: West Coast hip-hop; G-funk
- Length: 3:00
- Label: 4Hunnid
- Songwriters: Keenon Jackson; Alejandro Carranza; Fenix Rypinski; Tyrone Griffin Jr.; James Royo; Norman Lewis; Kevin McCord
- Producers: Ty Dolla Sign; Damn James

YG singles chronology
"2004" (2025)	"Hollywood" (2025)	"Gang Gang Gangland" (2025)

Shoreline Mafia singles chronology
"Back in Bidness" (2025)	"Hollywood" (2025)	"Rockin" (2025)

Music video
- "Hollywood" on YouTube

"Hollywood" is a song by American rapper YG and American hip hop group Shoreline Mafia. It was released on May 23, 2025 as the second single from the former's seventh studio album, The Gentleman's Club. The song was produced by Ty Dolla Sign and Damn James.

== Composition ==
The song uses a G-funk beat and pays homage to Los Angeles. It mentions baby oil and Diddy parties in the beginning. Later on, YG raps "All the pretty hoes gon' play this / Joey Badass gon' hate this", referencing the rapper's feuds with West Coast hip-hop artists.

== Critical reception ==
Hollywood was met with critical acclaim. Alexander Cole of HotNewHipHop gave a positive review, writing "As for the song itself, this is a West Coast banger through and through. From the production to the performances, everyone is firing on all cylinders here." Shawn Grant of The Source commented "Shoreline Mafia brings raw edge, while Ty Dolla $ign's production blends bounce and polish".

== Music video ==
The music video was released alongside the single. Shot in black-and-white, it opens with YG and Shoreline Mafia arriving in a black limousine in matching all-black suits. YG carries takeout from Marathon Burger, as a tribute to rapper Nipsey Hussle. The clip contains scenes of pouring champagne, lingerie-clad dancers and the rappers' similarly dressed entourage in a Soul Train line. It also features a cameo from Ty Dolla Sign, who makes the beat on a drum pad.

== Charts ==
Chart performance for "Hollywood"
Chart (2025)	Peak position
US Bubbling Under Hot 100 (Billboard)	3
US Hot R&B/Hip-Hop Songs (Billboard)	18
US Rhythmic Airplay (Billboard)	17
