= Rockin =

2025 single by Shoreline Mafia

Single by Shoreline Mafia
- Released: June 27, 2025
- Genre: West Coast hip-hop
- Length: 2:09
- Label: 300; Atlantic
- Songwriters: Alejandro Carranza; Fenix Rypinski; Marceles Carter; Norman Lewis
- Producers: Monster Norm; Bandz; Jay Nari; John Montes; John Papi; Kam Jackson

Shoreline Mafia singles chronology
"Hollywood" (2025)	"Rockin" (2025)	"Out My Mind" (2025)

Music video
- "Rockin" on YouTube

"Rockin" is a single by American hip hop group Shoreline Mafia. It contains a sample of "Funky Little Beat" by Connie and was produced by Monster Norm, Bandz, Jay Nari, John Montes, John Papi and Kam Jackson.

== Composition ==
The song prominently samples "Funky Little Beat" and uses a bouncy, string-laden instrumental. In the lyrics, Shoreline Mafia raps about the women in their sex life, their influence in the streets and success.

== Critical reception ==
Rockin was critically acclaimed for its fast paced, 80’s party vibe energy. Zachary Horvath of HotNewHipHop gave a positive review, writing "To no surprise, it's an infectious banger, and the beat has a lot to do with it." In regard to the sample, he commented that it "keeps the vibes high" and the instrumental "complements it perfectly."

== Music video ==
The music video was released alongside the single. It opens with a quote from "To Live & Die in L.A." by 2Pac: "It wouldn't be L.A. without Mexicans, Black love, and Brown pride in the sets again."

== Charts ==
Chart performance for "Rockin"
Chart (2025)	Peak position
US Bubbling Under Hot 100 (Billboard)	19
US Hot R&B/Hip-Hop Songs (Billboard)	25
US Rhythmic (Billboard)	16
