= Mafia Bidness =

Studio album by Shoreline Mafia
- Released: July 31, 2020
- Genre: Hip-hop
- Length: 1:03:53
- Label: Atlantic
- Producer: AyeBromar; 1Smackz; ACETHEFACE; Arjayonthebeat3x; Bruce24k; Cypress Moreno; DJ Flipp; Helluva; J. Gramm; JoogSzn; LowTheGreat; Ron-Ron The Producer; Young Kilo

Shoreline Mafia chronology
Party Pack Vol. 2 (2019)	Mafia Bidness (2020)	Back In Bidness (2025)

Singles from Mafia Bidness
- 1. "Gangstas & Sippas" Released: April 20, 2020; 2. "Ride Out" Released: May 29, 2020; 3. "Change Ya Life" Released: July 2, 2020; 4. "Perc Popper" Released: July 17, 2020; 5. "How We Do It" Released: July 24, 2020

Professional ratings
Review scores
Source	Rating
AllMusic	3.5/5 stars
Pitchfork	6.5/10

Mafia Bidness is the debut studio album by American Los Angeles-based hip-hop quartet Shoreline Mafia. It was released on July 31, 2020 via Atlantic Records. Production was handled by twelve record producers, including Ayebromar, Ron-Ron The Producer, Bruce24k, ACETHEFACE and Helluva. It features guest appearances from 03 Greedo, 1takejay, AFN Peso, Drakeo the Ruler, Duke Deuce, Future, GT, Kodak Black, Lil Yachty, Mike Sherm, Nfant, Q Da Fool, Wiz Khalifa, YG and Z Money.

== Release and promotion ==
In early April 2020, Shoreline Mafia founding member Fenix Flexin announced that he would be leaving the group after the release of Mafia Bidness.

The album was promoted by five singles: "Gangstas & Sippas", "Ride Out", "Change Ya Life", "Perc Popper" and "How We Do It". The music video for the album's fifth single was directed by John Rawl and released on July 29, 2020, with the song being released five days earlier on July 24.

The deluxe edition of the album was released on November 30, 2020. The deluxe edition includes eight new tracks, including the solo Rob Vicious song "Crash Dummy", which was produced by Rob himself.

== Track listing ==
No.	Title	Writer(s)	Producer(s)	Length
1.	"Intro"	Shoreline Mafia; Bruce Johnson	Bruce24k	1:48
2.	"Run It Back" (featuring 03 Greedo)	Alejandro Carranza; Fenix Rypinski; Robert Magee II; Malik Carson; Jason Jackson; LaRon Robinson; B. Johnson; Angelo Johnson; Terrence Hackett; Byron Thomas; Dwayne Carter; Terius Gray	Ron-Ron The Producer; Bruce24k; ACETHEFACE; JoogSzn	3:28
3.	"All the Time"	Carranza; Martin McCurtis	Helluva	2:08
4.	"Fuck It Up" (featuring Mike Sherm)	Rypinski; Michael Sherman; Robinson; B. Johnson	Ron-Ron The Producer; Bruce24k	2:28
5.	"Change Ya Life"	Carranza; Rypinski; McCurtis	Helluva	2:41
6.	"Big Tymer" (featuring Z Money and AFN Peso)	Carranza; Rypinski; Dominik Smith; Zernardo Tate	Ron-Ron The Producer	2:48
7.	"Poe the Drop" (featuring Future)	Carranza; Rypinski; Nayvadius Demun Wilburn; Robinson; A. Johnson	Ron-Ron The Producer; ACETHEFACE	4:16
8.	"Do the Most" (featuring Duke Deuce)	Carranza; Rypinski; Patavious Isom; Robinson	Ronron	3:18
9.	"Perc Popper"	Carranza; Rypinski; Omas Abbas	DJ Flipp	2:01
10.	"Hold On / Musty Freestyle" (featuring Drakeo the Ruler)	Carranza; Rypinski; Darrell Caldwell; Robinson; A. Johnson	Ron-Ron The Producer; ACETHEFACE	4:21
11.	"How We Do It" (featuring Wiz Khalifa)	Rypinski; Cameron Thomaz; Deangelo Smith; Montell De'Sean Jordan; Oji Pierce	LowTheGreat	2:31
12.	"Aww Shit"	Carranza; Magee II; Carson; Robinson; B. Johnson	Ron-Ron The Producer; Bruce24k	3:34
13.	"Bitches" (featuring 1TakeJay)	Carranza; Derrick Crudup Jr.; Eddy Moreno; Jachin Jenkins	Cypress Moreno; Young Kilo	2:54
14.	"Gangstas & Sippas" (featuring Q Da Fool and YG)	Carranza; Rypinski; George Hundall; Keenon Jackson; Robinson; A. Johnson; Anthony Taylor; Todd Anthony Shaw	Ron-Ron The Producer; ACETHEFACE	3:22
15.	"Hoe Shit"	Rypinski; B. Johnson	Bruce24k	2:48
16.	"On the Low" (featuring Kodak Black)	Carranza; Magee II; Bill K. Kapri; Julian Gramma; B. Johnson	Bruce24k; J. Gramm	2:55
17.	"Brand New"	Carranza; B. Johnson	Bruce24k	2:45
18.	"Fully Loaded" (featuring GT and Nfant)	Carranza; Rypinski; Magee II; Gary Thomas; Jonathan Stafford; A. Johnson	ACETHEFACE	2:46
19.	"Ride Out" (featuring Lil Yachty)	Carranza; Rypinski; Magee II; Miles McCollum; Robinson	Ron-Ron The Producer	3:54
20.	"Fucc Cuh" (featuring 03 Greedo)	Carranza; J. Jackson; Christopher Stewart; Juan T. Jones; Roberts D. Dickson; Terius Nash	1Smackz; Arjayonthebeat3x	4:13
21.	"Bands"	Carranza; Rypinski; Magee II; Carson; A. Johnson	ACETHEFACE	2:54
Total length:				1:03:53

Deluxe edition
No.	Title	Writer(s)	Producer(s)	Length
1.	"Lurkin"	Alejandro Carranza; Fenix Rypinski; LaRon Robinson	Ronron
2.	"Rubba Band Wrist"	Carranza; Rypinski; Chandler Ingram; Ives Lemos	DJ Flippp; Ghostrage
3.	"Backdoor"	Malik Carson; Max Lukens; Michael Montoya	Morgothbeat; Myrone
4.	"Disgusting"	Carranza; Rypinski; Robinson; David Biral; Denzel Baptiste	Ronron; Take a Daytrip
5.	"Never Be You"	Carranza; Rypinski; Robert Magee II; Devonte Kasey-Terry	KashOnTheBeat
6.	"Too Rich" (featuring Z Money)	Carranza; Rypinski; Zernardo Tate; Robinson	Ronron
7.	"Crash Dummy"	Magee II	Rob Vicious
8.	"Gas"	Carranza; Rypinski; Magee II; Carson	Cypress Moreno

== Appearances ==
=== Original release ===
Artist	Notes
OhGeesy	performs on 17 tracks
Fenix Flexin	performs on 12 tracks
Rob Vicious	performs on 8 tracks
Master Kato	performs on 3 tracks

=== Deluxe Edition ===
Artist	Notes
OhGeesy	performs on 6 tracks
Fenix Flexin	performs on 6 tracks
Rob Vicious	performs on 3 tracks
Master Kato	performs on 2 tracks

== Charts ==
Chart performance for Mafia Bidness
Chart (2020)	Peak position
Canadian Albums (Billboard)	56
US Billboard 200	27

== Certifications ==
Region	Certification	Certified units/sales
United States (RIAA)	Gold	500,000^{‡}
^{‡} Sales+streaming figures based on certification alone.
