= The Pop Out: Ken & Friends =

2024 concert by Kendrick Lamar

- One-off concert by Kendrick Lamar
- Arrangers: PGLang; Free Lunch
- Location: Inglewood, California, U.S.
- Venue: Kia Forum
- Date: June 19, 2024
- No. of shows: 1
- Supporting acts: DJ Hed; Mustard
- Producer: AEG Presents

Kendrick Lamar concert chronology
- The Big Steppers Tour (2022–2024); The Pop Out: Ken & Friends (2024); Super Bowl LIX halftime show (2025)

The Pop Out: Ken & Friends was a one-off concert by American rapper Kendrick Lamar. It was held at the Kia Forum in Inglewood, California, on June 19, 2024. The Juneteenth and Black Music Month celebration marked Lamar's first major performance following his highly publicized feud with Canadian rapper Drake.

Lamar unexpectedly announced the Pop Out two weeks prior to the event. Its set list consisted of about 60 songs predominantly conceived by musicians based in the Greater Los Angeles area. Spanning over three hours, over 25 West Coast artists were featured during the event, including opening acts DJ Hed and Mustard, Ty Dolla Sign, Dom Kennedy, Steve Lacy, Tyler, the Creator, Roddy Ricch, YG, Schoolboy Q, Jay Rock, Ab-Soul, and Dr. Dre. Lamar performed four of his five Drake-aimed diss tracks, "Like That", "Euphoria", "6:16 in LA" and "Not Like Us", for the first time during his headlining set; the latter track was performed five consecutive times.

After witnessing an exceedingly high demand in tickets, Amazon Music live-streamed the Pop Out through Prime Video and Twitch. A total of 16,000 fans were in attendance for the event. The impromptu concert received widespread acclaim from critics, who hailed it as a cultural landmark for West Coast hip-hop and Lamar's legacy. It currently holds the record for the most minutes watched of any video production distributed by Amazon Music.

== Background ==
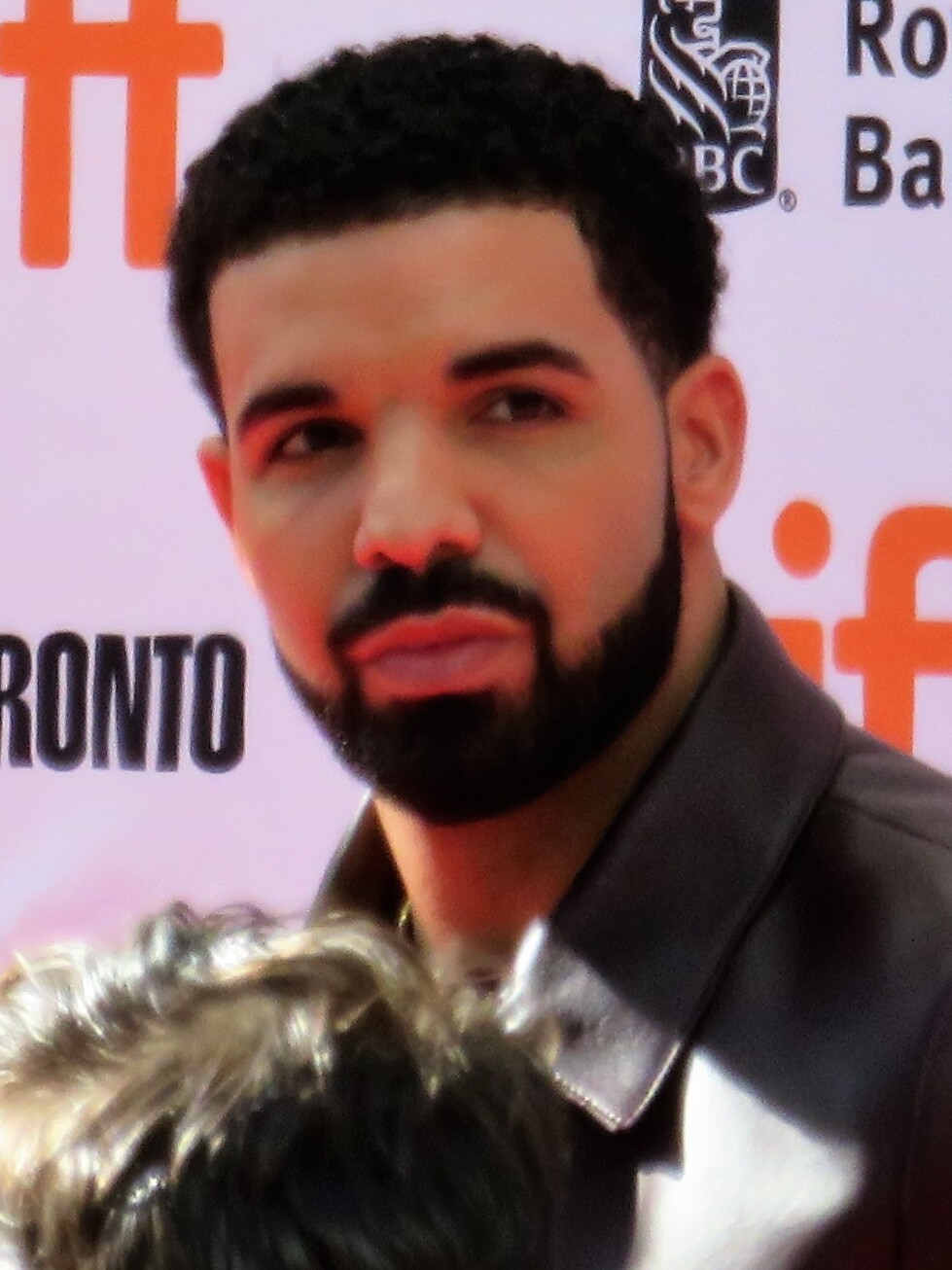
Kendrick Lamar and Drake's feud escalated in April and May 2024, with the former releasing the number-one hit "Not Like Us".

On March 22, 2024, American rapper Kendrick Lamar reignited his decade-long feud with Canadian rapper Drake. Lamar unexpectedly appeared on Future and Metro Boomin's single "Like That" to diss Drake and J. Cole for their 2023 single "First Person Shooter". A critical and commercial success, "Like That" topped the U.S. Billboard Hot 100 chart for three consecutive weeks.

Throughout April and May, Lamar and Drake exchanged various diss tracks aimed at the opposing party and other artists who were involved in their conflict, such as Future, Metro, ASAP Rocky, Rick Ross, and The Weeknd. Drake's arsenal included "Push Ups", "Taylor Made Freestyle" (which has since been removed), and "Family Matters", while Lamar's featured "Euphoria", "6:16 in LA", and "Meet the Grahams". As time passed, the allegations both rappers utilized against their opponent grew more severe. After Lamar released "Not Like Us", which marked his second Hot 100 chart-topper of 2024, Drake reportedly conceded with "The Heart Part 6". Rap analysts reached a unanimous verdict in Lamar's favor.

The Pop Out: Ken & Friends was surprise announced by Lamar on June 5, 2024, as his first major performance following the feud. Described by publications as a "victory lap" celebration, the concert is titled after a lyric from "Not Like Us"—"Sometimes you gotta pop out and show niggas"—and coincides with Juneteenth. Its sponsors include Cash App, Gin & Juice, and Visa. The promotional poster for the event, which premiered alongside the announcement, is a motor vehicle sporting an airbrushed mural depicting roses, a pair of dice, and praying hands; its license plate lists the show details.

At the time the Pop Out was formally announced, no special guests were named. It elicited a range of speculation amongst media outlets as to who would join Lamar during his performance. On the eve of the concert, DJ Hed revealed on social media that he and Mustard would be the opening acts and shared the program itinerary. Each opener was slated to follow the headlining act's lead and be accompanied a group of special guests.

== Ticket sales ==
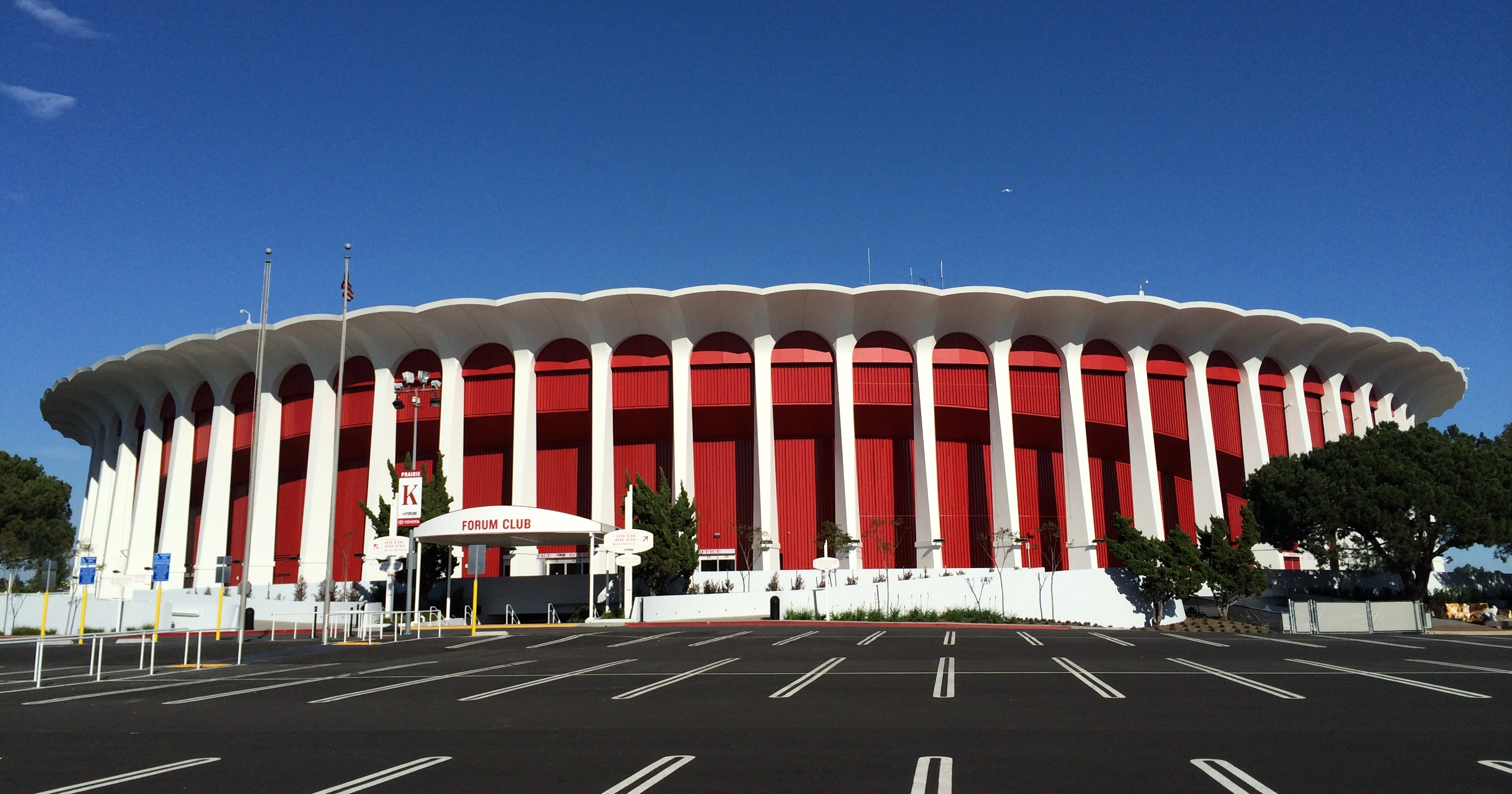
The Pop Out: Ken & Friends was held at the Kia Forum in Inglewood, California.

Ticket sales for the Pop Out were primarily handled by Ticketmaster, although some sales occurred on other ticketing agencies. Cash App cardholders enjoyed presale access on June 6, due to Lamar's partnership with the payment service. Met with a "staggering high" demand, tickets sold out instantly after they went on sale to the general public the following day. Some social media users who waited in the queue area shared that they were in line behind over 100,000 prospective buyers. An estimated 16,000 total fans were in attendance for the concert.

Confirmed prices were reportedly affordable; however, scalpers and bots purchased tickets in bulk and listed them on resale platforms, resulting in exacerbated fees. On Ticketmaster, resale options ranged between $350 to $1,500 for a single seat. Observers such as Complex's Jordan Rose grew skeptical about how the concert's intentions would be accurately translated on-air. He assumed that the majority of attendees would be White Americans, instead of Black Americans or other persons of color, but found that at least two-thirds of the actual audience were Black or Brown.

== Broadcasting ==
Hours after the general sale commenced, Amazon Music announced that the Pop Out will be live-streamed on Prime Video and the music streaming platform's Twitch channel from 4 p.m. to 8 p.m. PT. The livestream was part of the streaming service's "Forever the Influence" initiative, which celebrates the contributions of Black artists, producers, and songwriters who have "shaped cultural landscapes" throughout Black Music Month. Power 106, the premier hip hop and rhythmic contemporary radio station in Greater Los Angeles, temporarily rebranded as "Kendrick 106" and exclusively played Lamar's discography from 6 a.m. to midnight on Juneteenth to commemorate the concert.

== Production ==
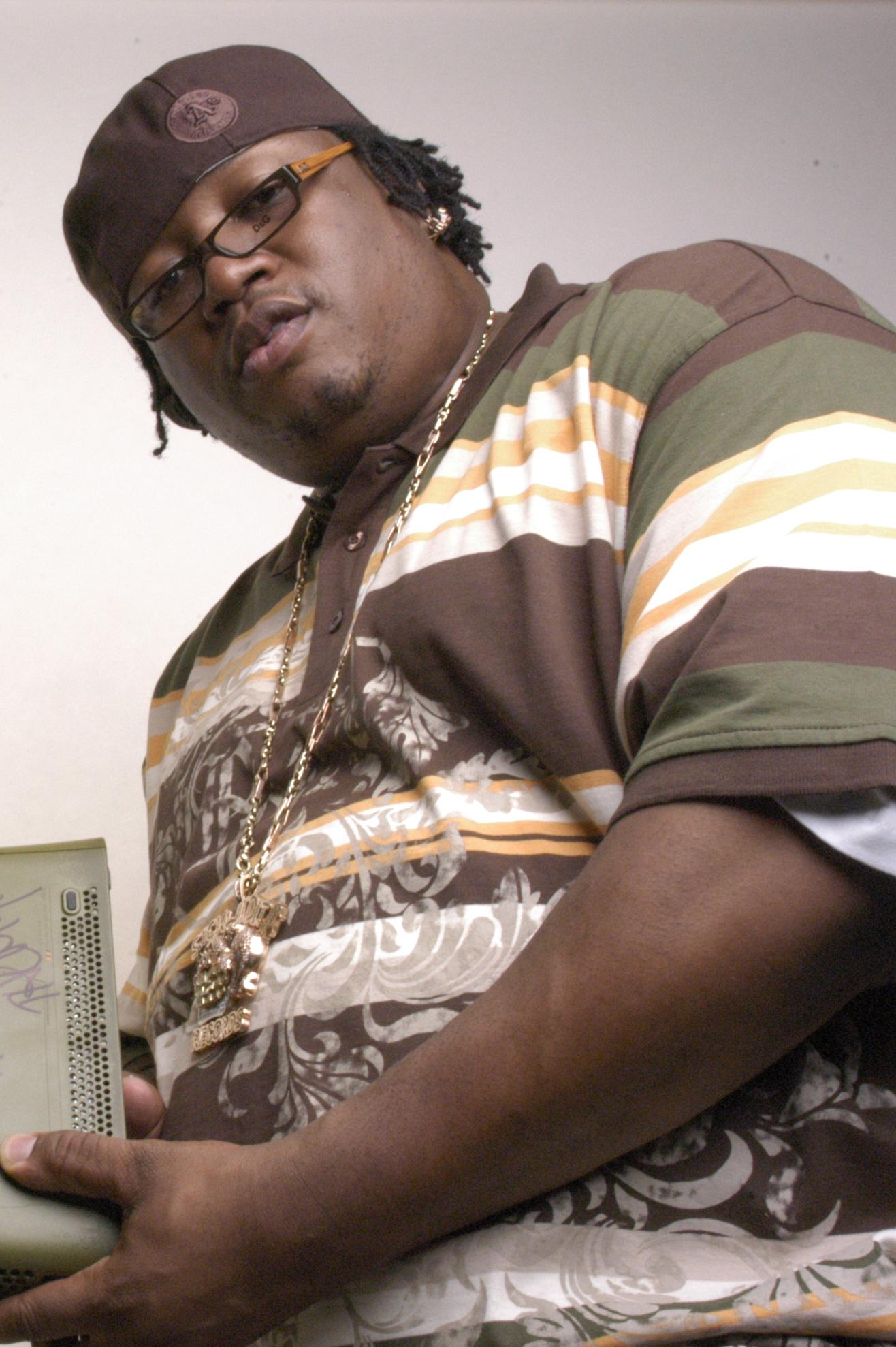
E-40, who narrated the Pop Out, recorded his parts soon after arriving in Washington, D.C.

The Pop Out was presented by PGLang—Lamar's creative company—and Free Lunch. Anschutz Entertainment Group (AEG) promoted the event under their AEG Presents banner. Lamar previously worked with Tim Hinshaw, the founder and chief executive officer of Free Lunch, on the concert film Kendrick Lamar Live: The Big Steppers Tour (2022) during Hinshaw's tenure as Amazon Music's head executive of hip hop and R&B.

Amazon Music's broadcast was directed by Damien Gravois and Mike Carson. Lamar, Dave Free and Hank Neuberger executive produced the program through PGLang and Springboard Productions. Carson, Free and Lamar additionally served as the creative directors. E-40 narrated the event. After touching down in Washington, D.C. from Aspen, Colorado, he quickly rushed to his hotel to "answer the call" and contribute some "authentic game" to what he already knew would be a "monumental night" for the West Coast.

=== Development ===
As Lamar and Drake's feud began dwindling down, DJ Hed proposed a plan to hold a concert at Inglewood's SoFi Stadium that could also serve as a music video for "Not Like Us". He did not know that Lamar was already developing the Pop Out when he shared his strategy with him. Although DJ Hed believed that he could have performed a successful show at SoFi, Lamar chose to hold the event at the Kia Forum due to the arena having his preferred environment.

PGLang and Free Lunch developed a list of artists they believed deserved to be spotlighted at the Pop Out. Lamar then contacted each act to ask if they would like to perform. Some artists, such as 03 Greedo and Vince Staples, declined due to scheduling conflicts. The Game was also absent, which elicited social media rumors on his whereabouts and relationships with Lamar and Drake. Roddy Ricch originally had plans to attend Paris Fashion Week, but canceled last minute to join the Pop Out. There were a few rehearsals held a week prior to the concert; however, DJ Hed told Los Angeles that he would not call them "rehearsals". He was given a game plan and a task to curate his set in a way that "makes sense from a DJ perspective and make it flow like it's supposed to." This made some rehearsals tough because the sets were curated on-the-spot with a limited timeframe. All of the participating artists were affiliated with opposing gangs and sections, but were able to get along with each other throughout the entire production.

Lamar wanted the impromptu event to feel like "some real hood shit," according to Jordan Rose. He witnessed several intimate and "energizing" moments backstage, such as Tommy the Clown practicing his routine side-by-side with YG and Dom Kennedy, or artists and their crew enjoying each other's company outside of the arena instead of staying siloed in their trailers. "I've never seen something like this in my lifetime, especially in the music space," Kennedy told him. "It just shows the power of being an artist." Although the event occurred on the heels of the feud, none of the artists said anything negative about Drake. "This was a pro us," DJ Hed explained to XXL. "It wasn't anti-anybody." Before the show started, he reminded Lamar that the event "ain't about nobody else. It's not about me, this is your moment," and encouraged him to "own" and enjoy it. Lamar simply replied with, "Say less."

=== Notable attendees ===
A litany of celebrities attended the Pop Out, including Top Dawg Entertainment founder and CEO Anthony "Top Dawg" Tiffith, Rick Ross, The Weeknd, LeBron James, Russell Westbrook, DeMar DeRozan, James Harden, Coby White, LaKeith Stanfield, Ayo Edebiri, Lauren London, SZA, Hit-Boy and his father Big Hit, Rapsody, Rosalía, Chloe Bailey, Chika, North West and Mark Phillips of RDCWorld. Instead of installing elevated risers on the general admission floor, special guests and artists who were not performing either sat in the arena seats or stood with each other on the floor.

Media outlets took special interest in DeRozan's appearance, given his friendship with Drake. Lamar's longtime partner, Whitney Alford, also attended the Pop Out with their two children and other family members. She was seen smiling, dancing, and rapping along to her partner's music; Vibe's Marc Griffin noted that her presence squashed various amounts of misinformation generated by Drake's fans and DJ Akademiks.

=== Fashion ===
Lamar worked with his frequent stylist Taylor McNeill to pay homage to his biggest influence, Tupac Shakur, through his wardrobe. On stage, he wore a crop red hoodie with a white t-shirt underneath, wide-leg jeans, a red custom-made 59Fifty with his company's name placed around the Los Angeles Dodgers' letters, and a pair of Nike Shox R4. Three necklaces hung around his neck, including a cross chain designed by Ben Baller that is worth about $600,000. Spectators were quick to notice that Lamar donned an ensemble similar to the one Shakur wore during the 1994 Source Awards.

Merchandise for the Pop Out were made available for purchase before the show commenced. One of the designs featured a plate of fried rice with the phrase "Not Like Us" below it, a reference to the "Euphoria" line that mentioned the Toronto-based Chinese restaurant New Ho King. Many attendees opted to create their own merchandise for the show instead. Reedley, California native Nicole Flemate used an application software to paste Drake's face onto a box of Ozempic that Lamar accused him of using in "Meet the Grahams" for weight loss.

== Concert synopsis ==
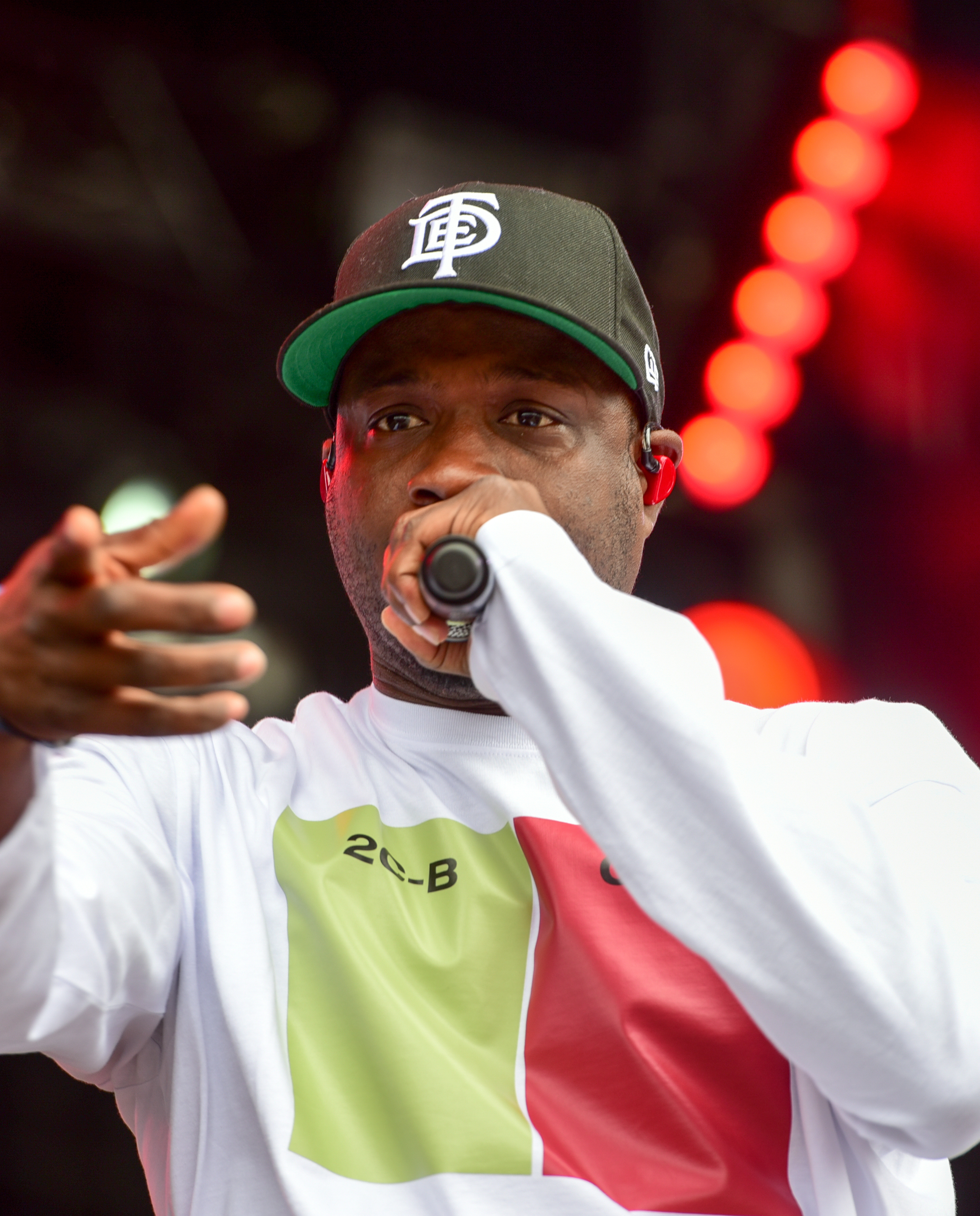
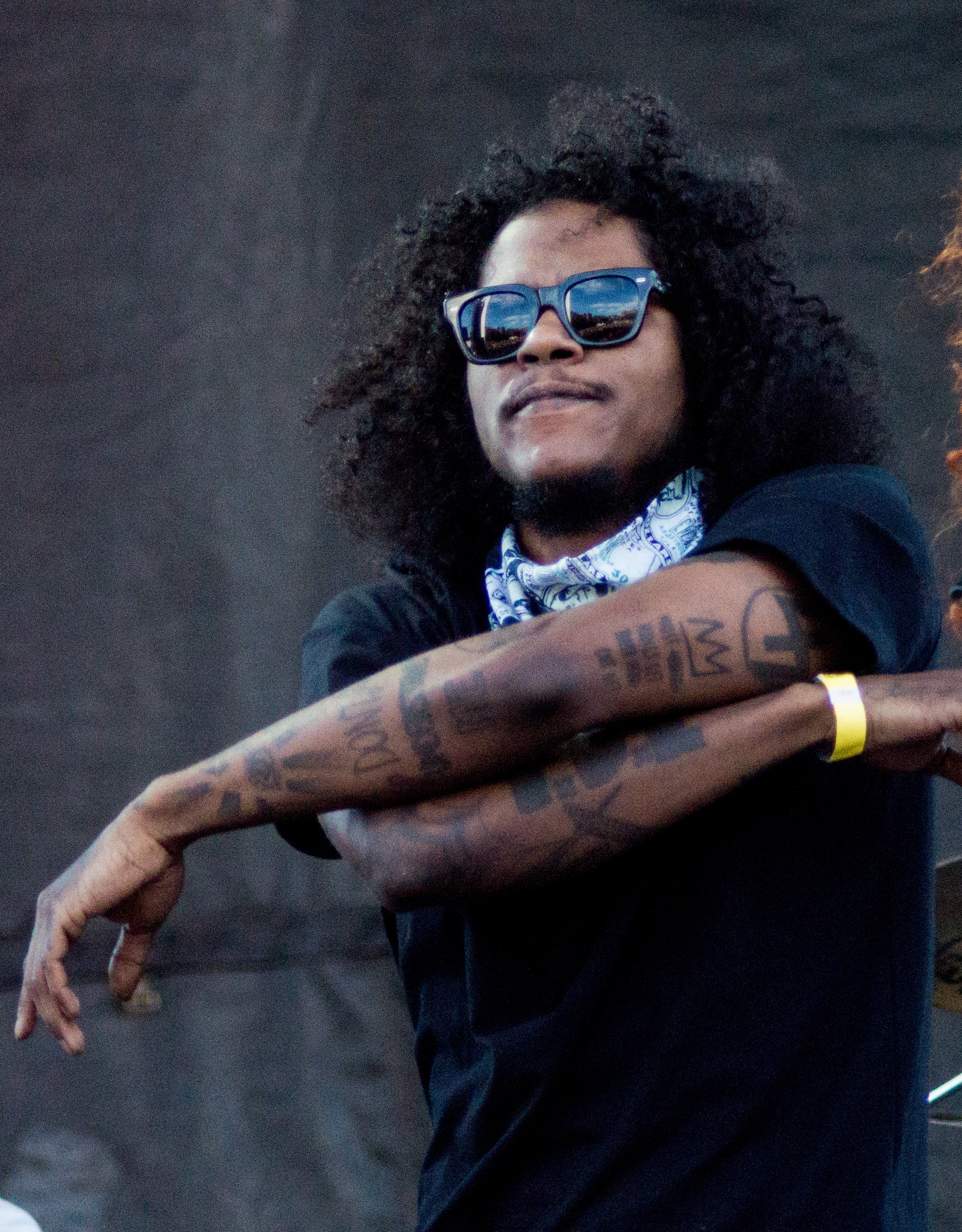
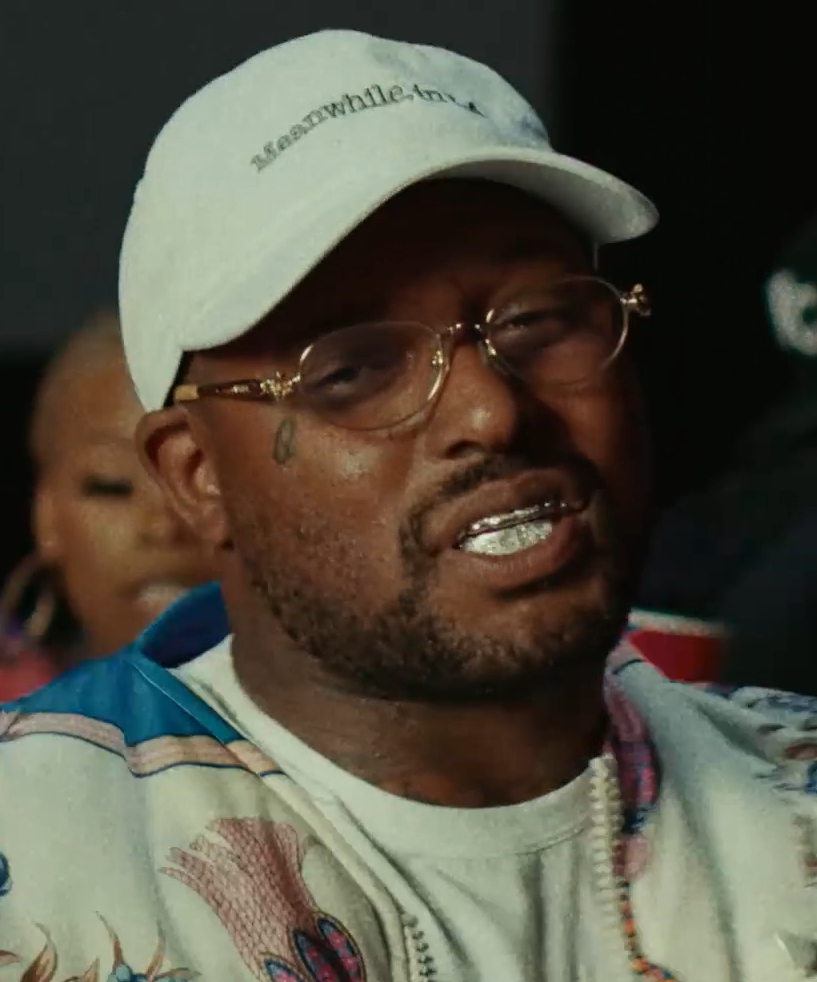
Among the wide array of special performers, Lamar held a Black Hippy reunion with Jay Rock, Ab-Soul and Schoolboy Q.

The Pop Out was over three hours long. It consisted of three acts, each subtitled "& Friends", that built upon one another as the show progressed. DJ Hed's opening act commenced the show. For over 45 minutes, he brought out over a dozen up-and-coming talent from Los Angeles one at a time to paint a "rough outline" of the city's current hip hop scene. Throughout his act, DJ Hed criticized the "straw men" who dismissed the West Coast's signature sonics. Remble, Westside Boogie, Ray Vaughn, Jay Worthy and Meet the Whoops, RJMrLA, OhGeesy, and Fenix Flexin were among the artists who performed during the first act. After JasonMartin closed out DJ Hed's set with "Like Whaaat", Tommy the Clown and the Hip Hop Clowns performed a dance number.

The second act focused on Mustard and his eclectic contributions to West Coast hip hop. As he played notable tracks like "Back That Azz Up", "Rack City", and "I'm Different", he welcomed close collaborators on the stage and shared some nostalgic tidbits. He noted that Ty Dolla Sign taught him how to produce records before they performed one of the first beats he ever made, "Paranoid". Before YG appeared for a mini-set, he reminisced about creating My Krazy Life (2014) together while living across from the Forum. Steve Lacy and Tyler, the Creator surprised the crowd with hits such as "Bad Habit" and "Earfquake". Nipsey Hussle was also honored during Mustard's set. As "Perfect Ten" echoed around the arena, the Jumbotron displayed a custom license plate of Hussle with his signature tagline, "The Marathon Continues". Mustard encouraged the audience to make noise that was "so loud" that Hussle could hear them before playing "Last Time That I Checc'd". Roddy Ricch joined in by performing "Racks in the Middle" before leaping into "Die Young", "The Box", and "Ballin'".

Lamar's victory lap encompassed the third and final act. He began his portion with the first live performance of "Euphoria", which contained updated lyrics aimed at Drake's possession of Shakur's crown ring. Sheldon Pearce of NPR Music noticed that as Lamar paraded the audience through a "tour past a corpse" using his greatest hits and career achievements, much of his lyricism now read as "prescient" disses towards Drake. Many critics noticed that Lamar did not perform any songs from his most recent album, Mr. Morale & the Big Steppers (2022). Pearce respected the omission as he felt the album's energy would not have fit the Pop Out's message: sharing one's platform instead of avoiding one's onus. Jay Rock joined Lamar to perform "Money Trees" while Ab-Soul accompanied him for the debut performance of "6:16 in LA". Schoolboy Q completed the Black Hippy reunion when he appeared to perform "Collard Greens". Lamar performed his verse on "Like That" for the first time before Dr. Dre made a surprise appearance to perform "Still D.R.E." and "California Love".

=== "Not Like Us" performances ===
To conclude the Pop Out, Lamar performed "Not Like Us" five times back-to-back with different elements infused in each iteration. He asked Dr. Dre after they finished performing "California Love" if he had anything he wanted to tell the crowd before he exited the stage. Dre said "yes" and asked for a moment of silence from the crowd before whispering the opening lines from "Not Like Us": "Psst, I see dead people." The debut performance of the song stopped once Lamar reached the line, "Why you trollin' like a bitch? Ain't you tired? / Tryna strike a chord and it's probably A minor".

Lamar let the crowd hold on to the last note before asking them, "Y'all ain't gonna let anyone disrespect the West Coast, huh? Oh, y'all ain't gonna let nobody mock and imitate our legends, huh?" He played "Not Like Us" a second time, but let the audience rap the song to him until the aforementioned line. The entire song was played for the third pyrotechnics-enhanced performance, which featured appearances by dancers Charm La'Donna—who is also Lamar's longtime choreographer—and Storm DeBarge. Mustard led a majority of the featured artists to return to the stage for the fourth installment. They were also joined by the basketball players Russell Westbrook and DeMar DeRozan, as well as members of several Los Angeles street gangs.

==== Group photograph ====
Before "Not Like Us" was played once more, Lamar organized a group photograph with all of the artists onstage. None of the special guests knew that he planned to take the picture. Lamar grew emotional as he gathered all of the participants, admitting that he and other Los Angeles residents have been struggling to cope with the deaths of Hussle and Kobe Bryant. "Let the world see this!" he exclaimed. "You ain't seen this many sections on one stage keeping it together and having peace." He asked everyone to take up the entire stage so everything would be shown. As Armen Keleshian captured the scene, Lamar proudly declared the Pop Out as "unity at its finest." "We done lost a lot of homies to this music shit, lot of homies to this street shit," he explained. "And for all of us to be on this stage together. Unity from each side of motherfucking L.A. Crips, Bloods, Pirus, this shit is special, man."

"Everybody on this stage got fallen soldiers," Lamar continued. "But we right here, right now, celebrating all of them, all talented individuals. This shit ain't got nothing to do with no motherfucking song at this point. Ain't got nothing to do with no back-and-forth records. It got everything to do with this moment right here. That's what this shit is about: bringing all of us together." Pearce compared Keleshian's photograph to Art Kane's A Great Day in Harlem (1958) and its 2005 Atlanta recreation assembled by T.I. "Not Like Us" was then performed for the fifth time. Its instrumental played in the background as everyone exited the stage.

== Reception ==
=== Critical response ===
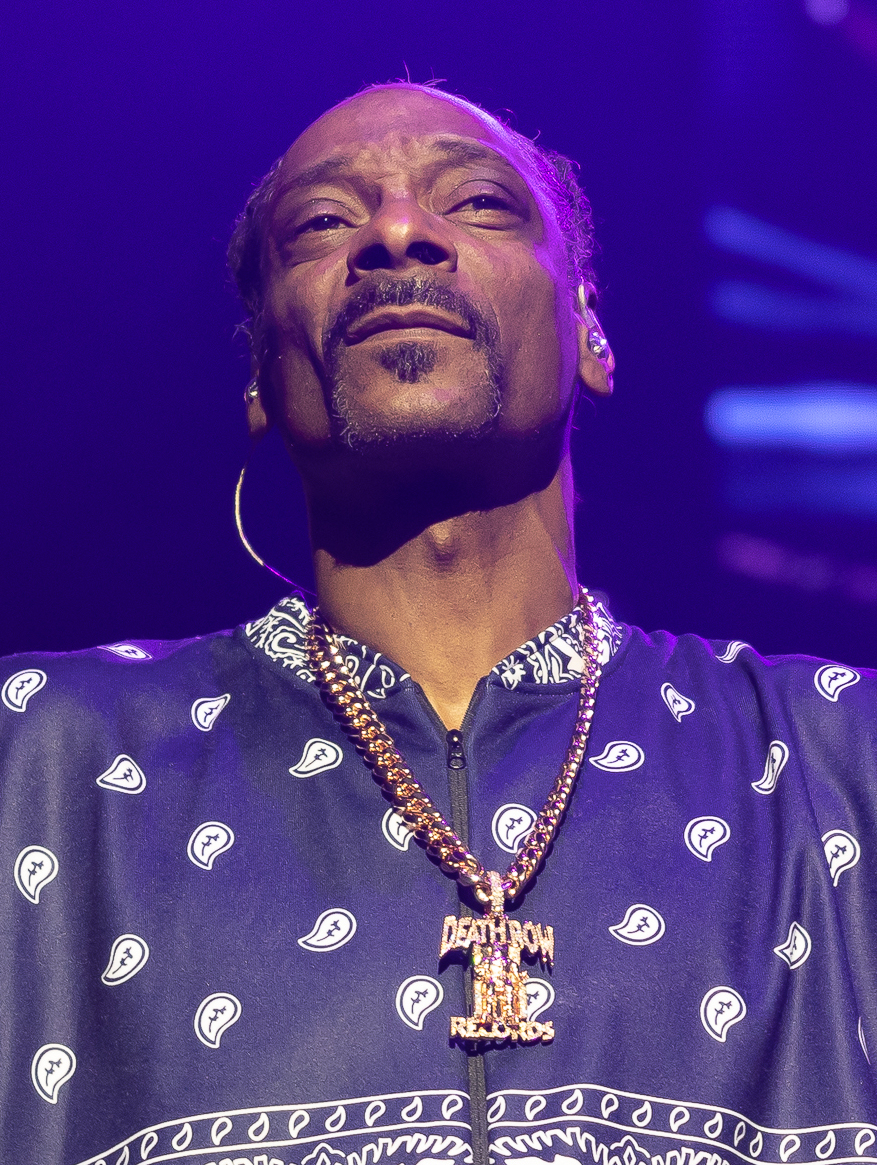
The one-off concert received praise from Snoop Dogg, crowning Lamar the "King of the West".

The Pop Out concert, especially the ending, was a moment for [Lamar] and the entire West Coast to remind us that they are bigger than their tragedies. They're resilient in their peace. Unyielding in their happiness. They're unwavering in their love of the culture and unabashed in their willingness to dance when joy is at their feet. These are the things they popped out and showed us.

— David Dennis Jr., Kendrick Lamar’s 'The Pop Out' concert turned hate into love, Andscape

The Pop Out: Ken & Friends was met with widespread acclaim from contemporary critics, who praised the production quality, inclusion of underground talent, versatile performances, Lamar's showmanship, and cultural significance to the West Coast. Aaron Williams for Uproxx stated that the event was a "testament" to Los Angeles' legacy of contrarianism, contradiction, and rejection of "external" definitions. Pitchfork's Paul A. Thompson dubbed the "unforgettable haters' ball" as one of the most electric concerts in hip hop history. Ryan Pearson of the Associated Press hailed the livestream as a "cathartic celebration," while Andscape's David Dennis Jr. called it the best hip hop concert he has ever enjoyed through a television screen.

Several journalists, including Billboard's Angel Diaz, believed that the Pop Out cemented Lamar's legacy as one of the greatest rappers of all time and the new "King of Rap". Snoop Dogg crowned him the "King of the West" and praised his ability to unite the hip hop community. Frazier Tharpe of GQ felt that the "love letter" to Los Angeles placed Lamar within the "wider tapestry" of its rap mythology. Mya Abraham, in a review for Vibe, commended him for turning Juneteenth into a "cultural reunion" and reminding viewers why Los Angeles hip hop is "essential" to music, culture, and beyond. Variety's Shaheem Reid claimed the event could serve as the opening of a "major resurgence" of West Coast hip hop under Lamar's leadership. Ice-T applauded Lamar's attempt at a "potential gang truce", which he considered to be a "cure for cancer" for those who grew up around Los Angeles' gang culture.

Dr. Dre's appearance, however, generated controversy due to his extensive history of violence against women. Dennis called his inclusion the Pop Out's "only blemish" and another example of "alleged abusers being platformed in moments that are supposed to promote ideas of Black unity, again putting all of us, especially Black women, in a place of having to overlook harm to get to the enjoyment." Kaitlyn McNab expressed similar sentiments in an op-ed for Teen Vogue. She found that Dr. Dre's presence left a "painfully ironic" stain on an otherwise "triumphant" concert.

=== Ratings and impact ===
The Pop Out: Ken & Friends broke the record for the most minutes watched of any Amazon Music video production across Prime Video and Twitch. Lamar, Black Hippy, Mustard and other surprise performers enjoyed a significant increase in on-demand streams in the US. Led by PGLang and Free Lunch, all of the participating artists collectively donated $200,000 to 20 charities and community initiatives based in Los Angeles.

Keleshian's group photograph was instantly hailed as a memorable image. Amazon Music plastered his photo on a celebratory billboard outside of the Kia Forum with the caption "Us." and subtitled with the concert details. Another version of the signage, subtitled "Thank You KDot", emerged on Compton's Rosecrans Avenue and Avalon Boulevard.

== Set list ==
Set list adapted from The Hollywood Reporter and Diario AS.

Act I – DJ Hed & Friends

1. "Touchable" (with Remble)
2. "Problems" (with Ray Vaughn)
3. "GoldMembers" (with Cuzzos)
4. "Light It Up" (with Rucci and AzChike)
5. "Meet the Whoops" (with Jay Worthy and Meet the Whoops)
6. "03 Flow" (with Wallie the Sensei)
7. "Silent Ride" (with Westside Boogie)
8. "Underrated" (with Zoe Osama)
9. "Right Wit It" (with Kalan.FrFr and G Perico)
10. "Bozo" (with Bino Rideaux)
11. "Walkin' In" (with BlueBucksClan)
12. "Get Rich" (with RJMrLA)
13. "Geekaleek" (with Shoreline Mafia)
14. "Like Whaaat" (with JasonMartin)

Act II – Mustard & Friends

15. "Pure Water"
16. "Be Faithful"
17. "Back That Azz Up"
18. "Soak City (Do It)" (with 310babii)
19. "Rack City"
20. "I'm Different"
21. "Show Me"
22. "I Don't Fuck With You"
23. "Overrated" (with Blxst)
24. "Chosen" (with Blxst and Ty Dolla Sign)
25. "Paranoid" (with Ty Dolla Sign)
26. "My Type of Party" (with Dom Kennedy)
27. "When I Come Around" (with Dom Kennedy)
28. "Static" (with Steve Lacy)
29. "Bad Habit" (with Steve Lacy)
30. "WusYaName" (with Tyler, the Creator)
31. "Earfquake" (with Tyler, the Creator)
32. "Perfect Ten" (tribute to Nipsey Hussle)
33. "Last Time That I Checc'd"
34. "Racks in the Middle" (with Roddy Ricch)
35. "Die Young" (with Roddy Ricch)
36. "The Box" (with Roddy Ricch)
37. "Ballin'" (with Roddy Ricch)
38. "BPT" (with YG)
39. "My Nigga" (with YG)
40. "You Broke" (with YG)
41. "Toot It and Boot It" (with YG)
42. "Who Do You Love?" (with YG)
43. "Big Bank" (with YG)

Act III – Ken & Friends

44. "Euphoria"
45. "DNA"
46. "Element"
47. "Alright"
48. "Swimming Pools (Drank)"
49. "Money Trees" (with Jay Rock)
50. "Win" (with Jay Rock)
51. "King's Dead" (with Jay Rock)
52. "6:16 in LA" (with Ab-Soul)
53. "Collard Greens" (with Schoolboy Q, Jay Rock and Ab-Soul)
54. "That Part" (Black Hippy remix; with Schoolboy Q, Jay Rock and Ab-Soul)
55. "King Kunta" (with Schoolboy Q, Jay Rock and Ab-Soul)
56. "M.A.A.D City"
57. "Humble"
58. "Like That"
59. "Still D.R.E." (with Dr. Dre)
60. "California Love" (with Dr. Dre)
61. "Not Like Us" (performed five times back-to-back-to-back-to-back-to-back)

=== Notes ===
- After the first act concluded, Tommy the Clown performed a dance number with the Hip Hop Clowns.
- The instrumental version of "Not Like Us" was played as the concert's exit song.
