= Shoreline Mafia Presents Rob Vicious: Traplantic =

Mixtape by Shoreline Mafia and Rob Vicious
- Released: July 13, 2018
- Genre: Hip-hop
- Length: 28:51
- Label: Atlantic
- Producers: AceTheFace; Calibaset; Chasethemoney; Beat Boy; Go Grizzly; Honorable C.N.O.T.E.; Jay$plash; Kid Wond3r; New Lane Ant; Ron-Ron The Producer; Sledgren

Shoreline Mafia chronology
| ShorelineDoThatShit (2017) | Shoreline Mafia Presents Rob Vicious: Traplantic (2018) | OTXmas (2018) |

Rob Vicious chronology
| Shoreline Mafia Presents Rob Vicious: Traplantic (2018) | Breakthrough (2020) |

Singles from Shoreline Mafia Presents Rob Vicious: Traplantic
- 1. "Bands" Released: September 14, 2018

Shoreline Mafia Presents Rob Vicious: Traplantic, often referred to simply as Traplantic, is the debut mixtape by American Los Angeles-based rapper Rob Vicious, as part of the rap group Shoreline Mafia. It was released on July 13, 2018, via Atlantic Records. Production was handled by AceTheFace, Calibaset, Chasethemoney, Go Grizzly, Honorable C.N.O.T.E., Jay$plash, Kid Wond3r, New Lane Ant, Ron-Ron The Producer, and Sledgren. It features a guest appearance from Da$H. Shoreline Mafia's biggest song, "Bands", is the final song on the mixtape, featuring appearances from all four Shoreline Mafia members.

== Background ==
The mixtape was supported by three music videos and a short documentary film. The first music video, for the song "Traplantic", was released on July 12, 2018. The second music video, for the song "Dear God", was released on August 17, 2018. The third music video, for the hit song "Bands", was released on September 26, 2018. The "Bands" music video features all four members of Shoreline Mafia partying at a pool and a mansion, while they dance, smoke, drink, and use a flamethrower. The music video also features cameo appearances from 1TakeJay, AZ Chike, and BandGang Lonnie Bands.

== Commercial performance ==
The mixtape's lead single, "Bands", was certified two-times platinum by the Recording Industry Association of America (RIAA) on June 30, 2022, with two million album-equivalent units in the United States. "Bands" is Shoreline Mafia's most popular song, with over 355 million streams on Spotify, as of September 2026.

== Track listing ==
| No. | Title | Writer(s) | Producer(s) | Length |
|---|---|---|---|---|
| 1. | "C Notes" (featuring Fenix Flexin and OhGeesy) | Alejandro Carranza; Carlton Davis Mays Jr.; Fenix Rypinski; Robert Magee II | Honorable C.N.O.T.E. | 2:25 |
| 2. | "Traplantic" | Magee II | New Lane Ant | 2:11 |
| 3. | "Change" (featuring Da$H) | Anthony Beecham | Kid Wond3r | 2:03 |
| 4. | "Drip" | Magee II | Go Grizzly | 1:57 |
| 5. | "Dear God" | Magee II | Ron-Ron The Producer | 2:37 |
| 6. | "How I Rock" | Magee II | Calibaset; Sledgren | 3:12 |
| 7. | "LA Flocker/Rackae" | Magee II | AceTheFace | 3:39 |
| 8. | "Dirty" (featuring Fenix Flexin) | Carranza; Laron Robinson; Rypinski; Magee II | Chasethemoney | 2:23 |
| 9. | "Get It" (featuring Master Kato) | Jarron Baker | Jay$plash | 2:44 |
| 10. | "Ain't Me" | Magee II | Calibaset; Sledgren | 2:43 |
| 11. | "Bands" (featuring OhGeesy, Fenix Flexin, and Master Kato) | Angelo Johnson; Carranza; Carson; Rypinski; Magee II | AceTheFace | 2:54 |
| Total length: | | | | 28:51 |

== Appearances ==
The following table lists the number of appearances on the mixtape by each member of Shoreline Mafia:

| Artist | Notes |
|---|---|
| Rob Vicious | performs on 11 tracks |
| Fenix Flexin | performs on 3 tracks |
| OhGeesy | performs on 2 tracks |
| Master Kato | performs on 2 tracks |
