= Remble =

American rapper (born 2000)

- Born: Eunique Cooper Remble; July 3, 2000 (age 25); San Pedro, Los Angeles, California, U.S.
- Genres: Hip hop
- Occupations: Rapper; songwriter
- Years active: 2018–present
- Label: Warner

Eunique Cooper Remble, known mononymously as Remble (born July 3, 2000), is an American rapper. Noted for his sharp humor and precise flow, he was described in the Los Angeles Times as "laceratingly funny" with a "distinctive and technically impressive vocal style." His debut mixtape, It's Remble, was released in July 2021.

== Early life ==
Remble was born in 2000 in the city of San Pedro. Aside from San Pedro, he also grew up in Long Beach, Lakewood and Bellflower. His father, convicted of drug trafficking, and began serving a life sentence when Remble was five. As a kid he listened to artists including Big Tymers and Lil Wayne—the music he heard at home—and later started listening to Ab-Soul, Dom Kennedy, Kendrick Lamar, J. Cole, and Drakeo the Ruler, as well as the artists affiliated with Drakeo's Stinc Team.

== Career ==
Remble started to make music with a friend who brought studio equipment to his house; they put the first song they recorded together on SoundCloud. In 2018, when he was 18, Remble released the first song he recorded in a studio, "Fortnite." As a buzz began to build, Remble continued to drop singles, including "Bang That" featuring Blueface.

In 2020, after a period of inactivity, Remble posted a video of his "Ruth's Chris Freestyle" to Instagram. He tagged Drakeo, who quickly responded with a comment and a DM about a collaboration. "Ruth's Chris Freestyle", credited to Remble X Drakeo the Ruler, was subsequently released. Jon Caramanica wrote in the New York Times that Remble's performance was "crisp and declamatory and, most disarmingly, deeply calm." Remble, who soon became a member of Stinc Team, came to consider Drakeo a mentor.

In February 2021, Remble released the track "Gordon Ramsay Freestyle." Its video went viral, receiving millions of YouTube views and inspiring internet-wide memes.

Remble signed with Warner Records in early 2021 and released his debut, It's Remble, in July. Composed of 13 songs, it featured guest appearances by Mozzy, Drakeo, and BlueBluxClan, among others. It's Remble received positive reviews from critics, including Caramonica, who described the record as "vivid" and "wonderful" in the New York Times, stating that Remble "declaims like he’s giving a physics lecture, all punching-bag emphasis and tricky internal rhymes". A review in HipHopDX noted Remble's "crisp bars and brazen originality" and David Aaron wrote "Remble clearly spits hard rhymes with hilarious punchlines, enunciating every word along the way" in HNHH. In the Los Angeles Times, August Brown referred to Remble as "LA's next big hip-hop star", and reported that with his "major-label deal, tens of millions of streams, and placement on Spotify’s 'Artists to Watch' list" he was at "the forefront of SoCal rap in 2022."

On December 18, 2021, Drakeo was stabbed during a backstage altercation at the Once Upon a Time in LA festival. He died the following morning. Remble learned of his death via a text message.

On June 19, 2024, Remble performed his song "Touchable" at Kendrick Lamar's concert The Pop Out: Ken & Friends at the Kia Forum in Inglewood, California, opening the first set by DJ Hed, titled the Act I – DJ Hed & Friends.

== Discography ==
Studio albums

- JUCO (2025)

Mixtapes

- It's Remble (2021)
