= Heat Stick =

2024 single by Shoreline Mafia

Single by Shoreline Mafia

from the album Paid n Full
- Released: May 10, 2024
- Genre: West Coast hip hop
- Length: 2:17
- Label: Atlantic
- Songwriters: Alejandro Carranza; Fenix Rypinski
- Producers: Bruce24k; Diego Ave

Shoreline Mafia singles chronology
"Perc Popper" (2020)	"Heat Stick" (2024)	"Work" (2024)

Music video
- "Heat Stick" on YouTube

"Heat Stick" is a song by American hip hop group Shoreline Mafia, released on May 10, 2024, as the lead single from OhGeesy's fourth solo studio album, Paid n Full (2025). It is the group's first release since 2020 and as a duo, as well as their debut on the Billboard Hot 100, peaking at number 97.

== Background ==
According to Luminate, the song amassed 6.5 million official streams in the United States in the tracking week of May 17–23, 2024.

== Composition ==
Described as a "dark and moody banger", the song finds Fenix Flexin and OhGeesy detailing how they spend a night partying and pursuing sexual pleasure.

== Charts ==
Chart performance for "Heat Stick"
Chart (2024)	Peak position
New Zealand Hot Singles (RMNZ)	22
US Billboard Hot 100	97
US Hot R&B/Hip-Hop Songs (Billboard)	27
