= It's Remble =

Mixtape by Remble
- Released: July 16, 2021
- Genre: Hip hop
- Length: 31:18
- Label: Warner
- Producer: Jaasu; 10Fiftyy; Laudiano; Verse2 Beats; Viper Beats; Phozer; ROBBIE; DJ Tray; 1JROfficial; Kenny Beats; Ambezza; Veyis; Bak; Red.E; Marko Lenz

It's Remble is the debut mixtape by American rapper Remble. It was released on July 16, 2021, through the recently signed Warner Records. The mixtape features multiple guest appearances including from Mozzy and Drakeo the Ruler. The mixtape peaked at number 2 on the Heatseekers charts.

== Release and promotion ==
It's Remble was released on July 16, 2021, through Warner Records, which Remble had recently signed with. Out of the thirteen songs in the mixtape, six were new releases, while the rest of the songs were previously released at random from as early as January 2020. He took inspiration from Dom Kennedy and Busta Rhymes for his earlier releases such as "Gordon R Freestyle," which, along with "Touchable," both received major performance on TikTok.

== Track listing ==
No.	Title	Producer(s)	Length
1.	"Touchable"	Jaasu; 10Fiftyy	2:02
2.	"Ted Talk"	Laudiano	2:05
3.	"No Competition"	Verse2 Beats	1:55
4.	"I Mean It" (featuring Mozzy)	Laudiano	2:47
5.	"Ruth's Chris Freestyle" (featuring Drakeo the Ruler)	Viper Beats	3:17
6.	"Ask Madden"	Phozer	2:30
7.	"Never Tell Freestyle"	ROBBIE	2:00
8.	"Watch How You Talk 2 Me"	DJ Tray	1:41
9.	"Audible" (featuring B.A.)	1JROfficial	2:33
10.	"Gordon R Freestyle"	Laudiano	2:05
11.	"Book Bag" (featuring BlueBucksClan)	Kenny Beats; Ambezza; Veyis	3:22
12.	"Firesticc" (featuring B.A.)	Kenny Beats; Ambezza; Bak	2:30
13.	"It's Been Real" (featuring Billy West)	Red.E; Marko Lenz	2:31
Total length:			31:18

== Reception ==
Some of the tracks in It's Remble received attention from critics due to Remble's "lecture"-like rapping. One of the most popular tracks from the mixtape is "Touchable," of which both The New York Times and the Los Angeles Times highlighted the lyrics “Came a long way from pre-K and eating Lunchables/I just took your life and as you know it’s unrefundable.”
