= Shoreline Mafia =

American rap group

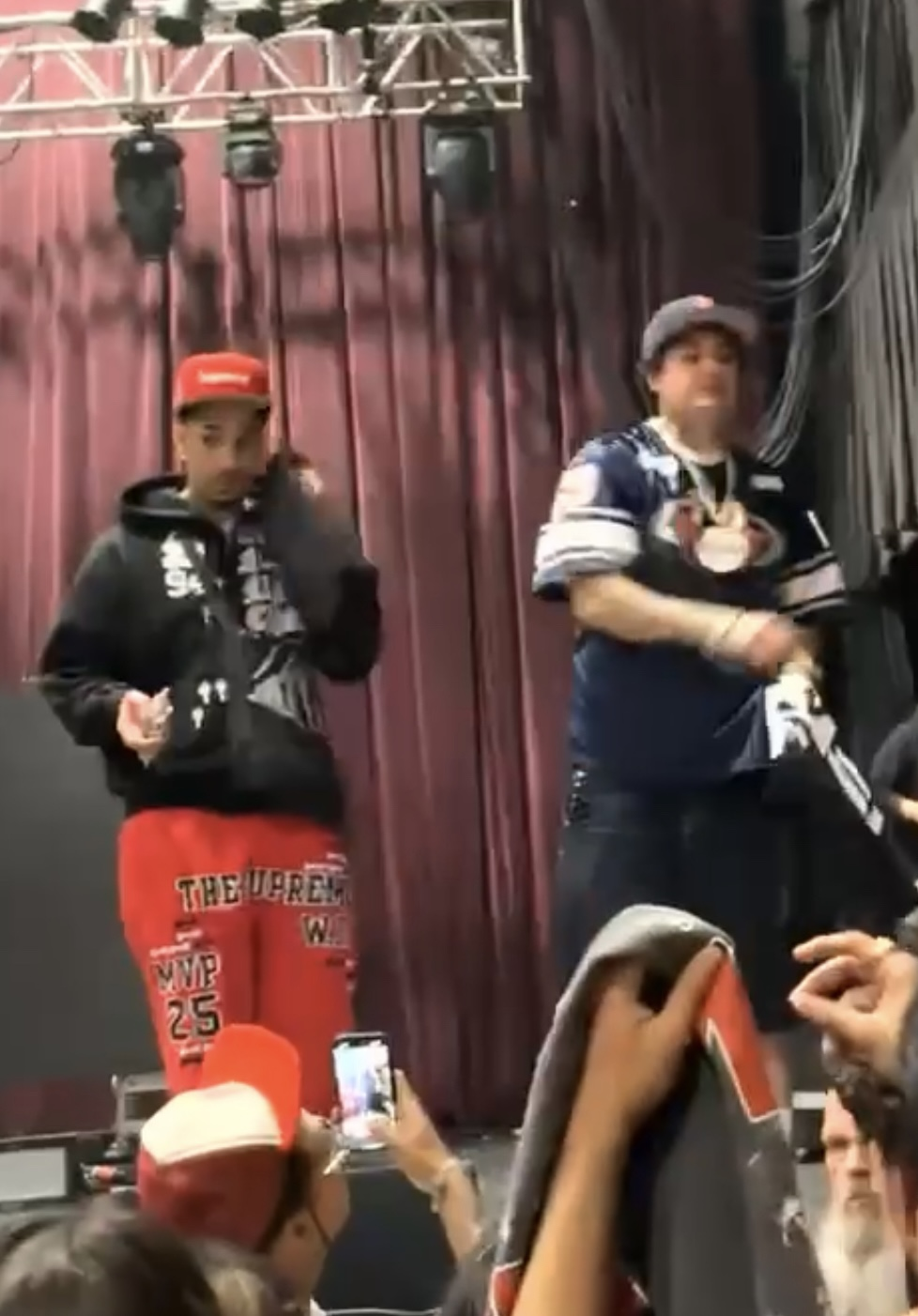
- Fenix Flexin and OhGeesy of Shoreline Mafia after a concert in 2025

Background information
- Origin: Los Angeles, California, U.S.
- Genres: West Coast hip-hop
- Years active: 2016–2020; 2023–present
- Label: Atlantic
- Members: OhGeesy; Fenix Flexin
- Past members: Rob Vicious; Master Kato
- Website: hellawave.com

Shoreline Mafia is an American hip-hop group based in Los Angeles, that was originally active from 2016 until 2020. Their debut mixtape, ShorelineDoThatShit (2017) garnered local success, leading to a commercial re-issue by Atlantic Records in May 2018. In August of that year, they released the extended play (EP) Party Pack, and its sequel, Party Pack Vol. 2 in September 2019. Their debut studio album, Mafia Bidness (2020) peaked at number 27 on the Billboard 200. In April of that year, one of the group's founding members, Fenix Flexin announced his departure, leading its remaining members to briefly disband.

In May 2024, members OhGeesy and Fenix Flexin reunited and released the song "Heat Stick" under the Shoreline Mafia name, marking their first entry on the Billboard Hot 100 and confirming the group's return as a duo.

== History ==
For most of their career, Shoreline Mafia was originally composed of four members: vocalists OhGeesy (Alejandro Carranza), Rob Vicious (Robert Magee), Fenix Flexin (Fenix Rypinski) and Master Kato (Malik Carson). OhGeesy and Fenix met in 2012 while doing graffiti in Los Angeles. The pair began making music soon after, and, sometime later, Rob Vicious and Master Kato joined them. Although they produced music for several years, they did not become a rap group until 2016. They chose the name Shoreline Mafia at some point after their formation.

In November 2017, they independently released their first full-length mixtape, ShoreLineDoThatShit. The album featured songs such as "Nun Major," "Musty," and "Bottle Service". Most of the songs on the album were produced by Ron-Ron including "Musty" and "Bottle Service", the beats for which the group was not initially authorized to use. Despite this, the two parties eventually formed a partnership that continues to exist. In December of that year, the group performed at the Rolling Loud Festival in San Bernardino, California. In the spring of 2018, the group headlined their "Only The Xclusives" (OTX) tour.

In May 2018, Atlantic Records announced that it had signed Shoreline Mafia. At that time, the label also re-released ShoreLineDoThatShit and debuted a new music video for the song "Musty". Later that month, the group embarked on the "Still OTX" tour, which included stops at the Rolling Loud Festival in Miami and, later, at the Billboard Hot 100 Music Festival in New York. In June 2018, Shoreline Mafia was featured on songs on the Ron-Ron and Friends compilation mixtape alongside 03 Greedo, Drakeo the Ruler, and others.

The following month, Rob Vicious released a solo mixtape titled Traplantic. The songs on the album also featured members of Shoreline Mafia, including "Bands" which had verses from everyone. In August 2018, the group released a 4-track EP called Party Pack via Atlantic Records. In the fall of 2018, the group went on their "Only The Xclusives" tour throughout the United States. The group also performed at the Los Angeles iteration of the Rolling Loud Festival in December 2018. In early April 2020, Fenix Flexin announced that he would be leaving Shoreline Mafia after the release of their new album, Mafia Bidness. The album followed on July 31, 2020.

Currently, members OhGeesy and Fenix Flexin reunited under the Shoreline Mafia group name as confirmed by both OhGeesy and Fenix Flexin in an our generation YouTube video, where they performed together at the Hollywood Palladium on October 6, 2023, and potentially hinted at releasing new music together soon. On May 10, 2024, OhGeesy announced the group’s return with a show in late September 2024 to celebrate the 5th anniversary of Party Pack Vol. 2, and they released the single "Heat Stick" under Shoreline Mafia on all platforms, confirming the return of the group as a duo.

On June 19, 2024, they performed the song "Geekaleek", for Kendrick Lamar's concert The Pop Out: Ken & Friends at the Kia Forum in Inglewood, California, during the first set by DJ Hed, titled the Act I – DJ Hed & Friends.

== Members ==
Current members

- OhGeesy – lead vocals, backing vocals (2016–2020, 2023–present)
- Fenix Flexin – lead vocals, backing vocals (2016–2020, 2023–present)

Former members

- Rob Vicious – lead vocals, backing vocals, production (2016–2020)
- Master Kato – lead vocals, backing vocals (2016–2020)

== Discography ==
=== Studio albums ===
List of albums with selected album details
Title	Album details	Peak chart positions		Certifications
Title	Album details	US	CAN	Certifications
Mafia Bidness	Released: July 30, 2020 (US); Label: Atlantic; Format: Digital download, streaming	27	56	RIAA: Gold
Back in Bidness	Released: April 4, 2025 (US); Label: Atlantic; Format: CD, digital download, streaming	182	—	

=== Mixtapes ===
List of mixtapes with selected album details
Title	Mixtape details	Certifications
ShorelineDoThatShit	Released: November 2017 (US); Label: Independent (re-released by Atlantic on May 4, 2018); Format: Digital download, LP, streaming	RIAA: Gold; MC: Gold
Shoreline Mafia Presents Rob Vicious: Traplantic (with Rob Vicious)	Released: July 13, 2018 (US); Label: Atlantic; Formats: Digital download, streaming	
OTXmas	Released: December 7, 2018 (US); Label: Atlantic; Formats: Digital download, streaming	

=== EPs ===
List of EPs with selected album details
Title	EP details	Peak chart positions	
Title	EP details	US	CAN
Trapped It Out	Released: December 4, 2016; Label: Independent; Formats: Digital download	—	—
Party Pack	Released: August 31, 2018 (US); Label: Atlantic; Formats: Digital download, streaming	—	—
Party Pack, Vol. 2	Released: September 4, 2019; Label: Atlantic; Formats: Digital download, streaming	61	87
Bidness Is Boomin	Released: May 1, 2026; Label: Atlantic; Formats: Digital download, streaming	—	—

=== Singles ===
List of singles showing year released and album name
Title	Year	Peak chart positions			Certifications	Album
Title	Year	US	US R&B/HH	NZ Hot	Certifications	Album
"Musty"	2017	—	—	—	RIAA: Platinum; MC: Platinum	ShorelineDoThatShit
"Bottle Service"	2017	—	—	—	RIAA: Gold; MC: Gold	ShorelineDoThatShit
"Nun Major"	2017	—	—	—	RIAA: Platinum; MC: Platinum	ShorelineDoThatShit
"Whuss The Deal"	2017	—	—	—	MC: Gold	ShorelineDoThatShit
"Bands" (with Rob Vicious)	2018	—	—	—	RIAA: 2× Platinum; MC: 2× Platinum	Traplantic
"Foreign"	2018	—	—	—		Party Pack
"Wings"	2019	—	—	—	MC: Gold	Party Pack Vol. 2
"Pressure"	2019	—	—	—		OTXmas
"Breakdown"	2019	—	—	—		Non-album singles
"Vicious"	2019	—	—	—		Non-album singles
"Gangstas & Sippas" (featuring Q Da Fool and YG)	2020	—	—	—	RIAA: Gold	Mafia Bidness
"Change Ya Life"	2020	—	—	—	RIAA: Gold	Mafia Bidness
"Perc Popper"	2020	—	—	—	RIAA: Gold	Mafia Bidness
"Heat Stick"	2024	97	27	22		Paid n Full
"Work"	2024	—	—	—		Paid n Full
"Back in Bidness"	2025	—	—	—		Back in Bidness
"Hollywood" (with YG)	2025	— (Note: "Hollywood" did not enter the Billboard Hot 100, but peaked at number three on the Bubbling Under Hot 100 chart.)	18	12	RIAA: Gold	The Gentlemen's Club
"Rockin"	2025	— (Note: "Rockin" did not enter the Billboard Hot 100, but peaked at number 19 on the Bubbling Under Hot 100 chart.)	25	—		Bidness is Boomin
