= Rob Vicious =

American rapper (born 1997)

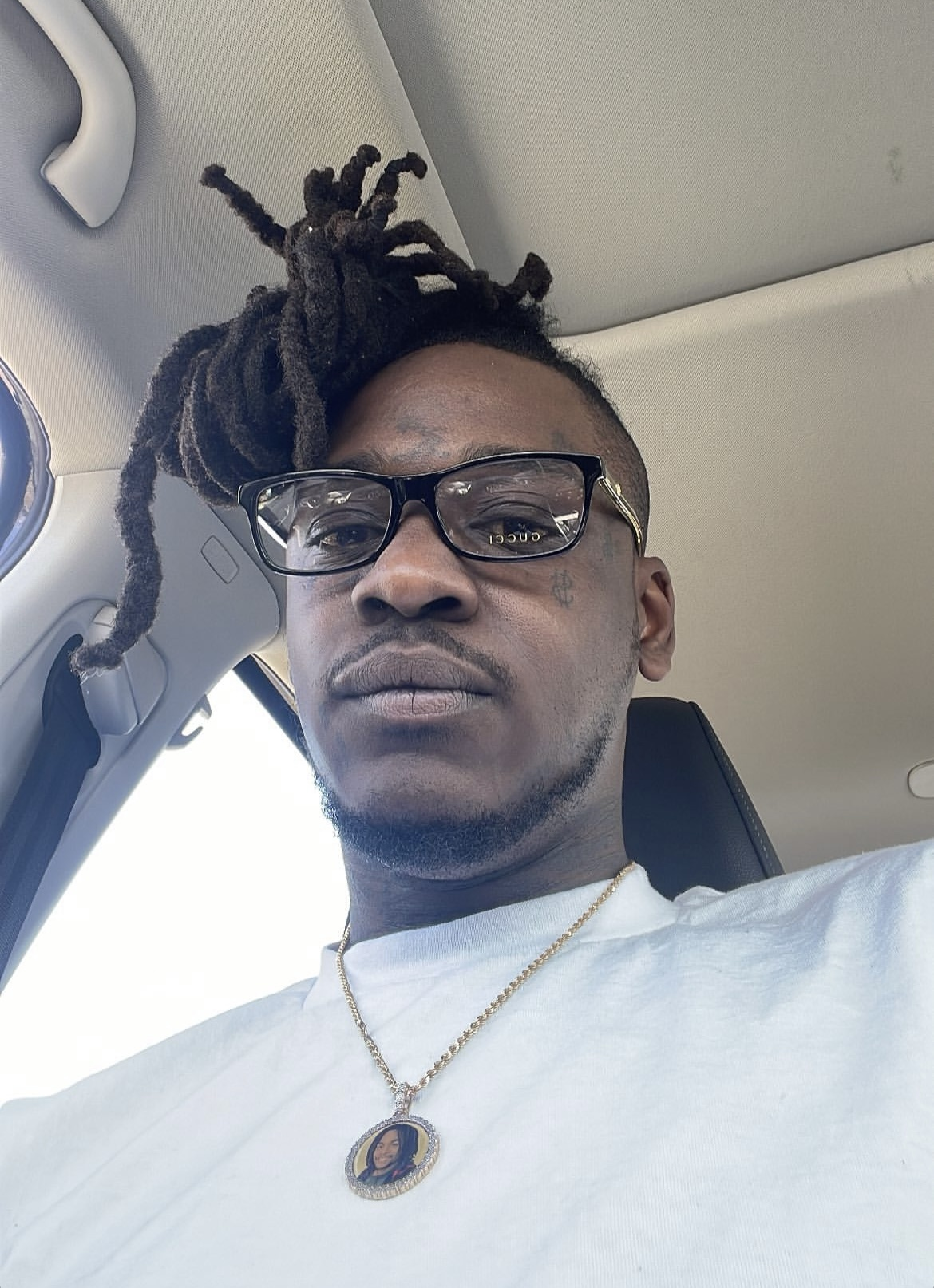
- Rob Vicious in 2022

Background information
- Born: Robert Charles Magee II; September 26, 1997 (age 29)
- Origin: Los Angeles, California, U.S
- Genres: Hip hop; trap
- Occupations: Rapper; songwriter; record producer
- Years active: 2015–present
- Label: Atlantic (2018-2021), Create Music Group (2021-present)
- Formerly of: Shoreline Mafia

Robert Charles Magee II (born September 26, 1997), known professionally as Rob Vicious, is an American rapper and record producer from Los Angeles. He is a former member of the hip hop group Shoreline Mafia. Rob left Shoreline Mafia after the group disbanded following the release of the deluxe edition of Mafia Bidness (2020), the group's debut studio album. Since the group's disbandment, Rob has released multiple mixtapes and EPs as a solo artist. Rob produces much of his own music, including the Shoreline Mafia song "Crash Dummy".

== Career ==
On several different occasions, Rob has cited Tupac Shakur and his music as a significant influence.

=== Shoreline Mafia (2016–2020) ===
In December 2016, Shoreline Mafia released a four-track EP titled Trapped It Out, with appearances from only Rob Vicious and Fenix Flexin. The EP included Rob's debut as a producer on the track "Perk Joint".

In July 2018, Rob released a mixtape with Shoreline Mafia titled Traplantic. The album includes the hit single "Bands", which features all four members of Shoreline Mafia. "Bands" was certified double platinum by the Recording Industry Association of America (RIAA). New Jersey-based rapper DA$H was featured on the mixtape, appearing on the track "Change". A short documentary about Rob and his upbringing titled the Traplantic Documentary was released by Shoreline Mafia in July 2018, shortly after the Traplantic mixtape was released.

Rob performed with Shoreline Mafia at the Billboard Hot 100 festival in Wantagh, New York in August 2018, alongside Rich The Kid, Bhad Bhabie, Machine Gun Kelly, and several other rappers.

In October 2018, Shoreline Mafia announced a West Coast tour called the "Mafia Twins" tour. Rob Vicious and Master Kato headlined the tour, which occurred in November 2018. The tour included eight shows in the United States and one show in Canada, in Vancouver.

In March 2019, Rob appeared on the promotional single "Kick The Cup" alongside bandmate Fenix Flexin.

Rob and Shoreline Mafia bandmate OhGeesy were featured on 03 Greedo and Mustard's collaboration album, Still Summer In The Projects (2019). The pair appeared on the track "Trap House", which was released as the album's lead single in March 2019. "Trap House" was certified platinum by the Recording Industry Association of America (RIAA). Rob appeared in the song's music video alongside OhGeesy, Mustard, and a cardboard cutout of 03 Greedo, who was unable to appear due to being incarcerated.

=== Solo career ===
Rob's signature catchphrase, "Bitch I'm Rob Vicious", is repeated throughout much of his music. Rob's Instagram account is named after the catchphrase. Another catchphrase, "Aye Rob, I think the Feds is listenin", is frequently used as Rob's producer tag.

In July 2018, Rob made a guest appearance on the ManMan Savage song "All Day", which was later included as the final track on ManMan Savage's Christmas-themed album EAxmas (2018)."All Day" was produced by Ron-Ron The Producer.

In November 2018, Rob made a guest appearance on Kenny Beats and ALLBLACK's football-themed collaboration EP, 2 Minute Drills. Rob was featured on the song "Weigh Ins" and appeared in the song's music video.

In December 2018, Rob made a guest appearance on "Run It Up", a track by Boston-based rapper Jwu. Rob was featured alongside Chicago-based rapper Z Money, with production from Mike Crook and Dupri.

Rob released his debut solo mixtape Breakthrough in May 2020. The mixtape includes features from Fenix Flexin and NFant. The mixtape includes production from DJ Paul, Bruce24k, Hurtboy AG, Al B Smoov, Clay Priskorn, Funke, ManOhManFoster, K Wils, LeanYSL, and Yung Henny.

In May 2021, Rob was featured on former bandmate Fenix Flexin's debut mixtape, Fenix Flexin Vol. 1. Rob appears on the track "Feds", produced by DJ Flippp.

During the summer of 2021, Rob made a guest appearance on Swiggle Mandela's album, Movie Money (2021). Rob was featured on "Planet of the Bapes", the final track on the album.

Between 2022 and 2024, Rob released a five-part mixtape series titled the Fearless series. Rob produced most songs on the five mixtapes himself. The first mixtape, Fearless, was released in January 2022, followed by Fearless Vol. 2 in April 2022, and Fearless Vol. 3 in July 2022. The next mixtape, Fearless 4, was released in January 2024, and it includes an 03 Greedo guest appearance on the song "Cursed Since Birth". The last mixtape in the series, Fearless 5, was released in November 2024.

Rob has frequently collaborated with artists and producers such as 03 Greedo, 1TakeJay, AzChike, ALLBLACK, BandGang Lonnie Bands, Bruce24k, DJ Paul, DA$H, Earl Swavey, Kenny Beats, Ketchy The Great, Nfant, and Ron-Ron The Producer.

== Personal life ==
Rob moved often during his childhood, growing up in Memphis, Tennessee, Huntsville, Alabama, and Arkansas, in addition to his hometown, West Adams, Los Angeles. When he was 10 years old, Rob taught himself how to produce using FL Studio and began making music.

== Discography ==
Mixtapes

List of mixtapes, with selected details
Title	Details
Shoreline Mafia Presents Rob Vicious: Traplantic (with Shoreline Mafia)	Released: July 13, 2018; Label: Atlantic; Format: Digital download, streaming
Breakthrough	Released: May 1, 2020; Label: Atlantic; Format: Digital download, streaming
2 Vicious (with Lil Duece)	Released: June 18, 2021; Label: Create Music Group, Mackk & Company; Format: Digital download, streaming
Fearless	Released: January 25, 2022; Label: Create Music Group; Format: Digital download, streaming
Fearless Vol. 2	Released: April 28, 2022; Label: Self-released; Format: Digital download, streaming
Fearless Vol. 3	Released: July 8, 2022; Label: Self-released; Format: Digital download, streaming
Vicious Or Nothin	Released: November 12, 2023; Label: Self-released; Format: Digital download, streaming
Fearless 4	Released: January 17, 2024; Label: Self-released; Format: Digital download, streaming
Fearless 5	Released: November 28, 2024; Label: Self-released; Format: Digital download, streaming

Extended plays

List of extended plays, with selected details
Title	Details
I Think The Feds Listenin', Lace it Up (with LiGe)	Released: May 5, 2021; Label: Create Music Group; Format: Digital download, streaming
Adventure's Wit Da Squad (with YunTrivv)	Released: April 20, 2023; Label: YTP; Format: Digital download, streaming
Kuma Vicious (with King Kuma)	Released: June 6, 2025; Label: Create Music Group; Format: Digital download, streaming
