= Fenix Flexin =

American rapper (born 1995)

- Born: Fenixomar Rypinski; October 11, 1995 (age 30); Los Angeles, California, U.S
- Origin: Los Angeles, California, U.S
- Genres: West Coast hip-hop; trap
- Occupations: Rapper; songwriter
- Years active: 2012–present
- Labels: Atlantic; Empire
- Member of: Shoreline Mafia

Fenixomar "Fenix" Rypinski (born October 11, 1995), known professionally as Fenix Flexin, is an American rapper from Los Angeles. He is a founding member of the hip hop group Shoreline Mafia. In April 2020, Fenix announced that he would be leaving Shoreline Mafia later that year, after the release of their first studio album, Mafia Bidness. After the group's disbandment, Fenix released multiple mixtapes and an album as a solo artist. Fenix resumed performing as part of Shoreline Mafia in October 2023, rejoining the group as a member in May 2024.

== Career ==
=== Shoreline Mafia (2012–2020) ===
Fenix started rapping alongside members of Shoreline Mafia in 2012. He met member OhGeesy while graffitiing in Los Angeles. In 2016, Shoreline Mafia became a fully-formed rap band.

Shoreline Mafia independently released their first mixtape, ShorelineDoThatShit, in November 2017. Fenix appears on nine out of twelve tracks.

In May 2018, ShorelineDoThatShit was officially released on streaming platforms. The release includes four additional tracks. Fenix appears on the bonus track "Break a Bitch Bacc".

In August 2018, Shoreline Mafia released a 4-track EP titled Party Pack. Fenix appears on three tracks, including "Boot It Up".

In December 2018, Shoreline Mafia released OTXMAS, a Christmas-themed mixtape. Fenix appears on five out of eight tracks, including "Pressure".

In September 2019, Shoreline Mafia released an EP titled Party Pack, Vol. 2, a sequel to the August 2018 Party Pack. Fenix appears on nine out of twelve tracks, including a solo appearance on the lead single "Fell In Love".

Shoreline Mafia's debut studio album Mafia Bidness was released in July 2020. Fenix appears on 14 out of 21 songs, including the lead single "Gangstas & Sippas". In November 2020, the deluxe edition of Mafia Bidness was released, with Fenix appearing on six out of eight songs.

=== Shoreline Mafia (2023–present) ===
In October 2023, Fenix and OhGeesy reunited for a concert at the Hollywood Palladium in Los Angeles.

In May 2024, Shoreline Mafia reunited as a duo and released "Heat Stick", a single for their highly anticipated next album. This was their first release since November 2020. "Heat Stick" charted at 98 on the Billboard Hot 100.

On June 19, 2024, Fenix performed as part of The Pop Out: Ken & Friends (hosted by Kendrick Lamar) at the Kia Forum in Inglewood, California. Fenix performed the song "Geekaleek" with OhGeesy during the first set by DJ Hed, titled the Act I – DJ Hed & Friends.

In June 2024, Shoreline Mafia released "Work", a new single featuring vocals from Fenix.

=== Solo career ===
Fenix released his debut solo mixtape Fenix Flexin Vol. 1 in July 2021. The mixtape includes features from Drakeo the Ruler, Rob Vicious, Bravo The Bagchaser, D-Block Europe, Peso Peso and SaySoTheMac.

In July 2022, Fenix released another mixtape, Fenix Flexin Vol. 2. There were no featured artists on the mixtape.

In December 2023, Fenix released another mixtape titled Fenix Flexin Vol. 3, including features from 03 Greedo, Cypress Moreno and Rocco.

In June 2026, Fenix released the single "Rubberz"; a synth-pop and dance-pop song inspired by 1980s music which was a considerable departure from Fenix's earlier rap career. The difference in musical style led many to accuse the song of being AI-generated, which he denied. On August 3, 2026, it was confirmed that "Rubberz" was generated using the generative AI platform Treblo by the platform’s founder, Ryan Tremblay. It is the first AI-generated song to chart on the Billboard Hot 100.

== Personal life ==
Fenix is the father of two children.

In 2021, Fenix launched Burnt Company LA, a clothing and skateboarding shop.

=== Legal issues ===
In August 2024, Fenix was arrested for possession of Alprazolam without a prescription.

== Discography ==
=== Studio albums ===
List of studio albums, with selected details and chart positions
Title	Details
Back Flexin	Released: May 24, 2024; Label: Empire; Format: Digital download, streaming
A Faded State	Released: TBA; Label: Empire; Format: Digital download, streaming

=== Mixtapes ===
List of mixtapes, with selected details and chart positions
Title	Details
LA Pistons Vol. 1 (with G.T.)	Released: June 22, 2019; Label: Self-released; Format: Digital download
Bravoflexin (with Bravo The Bagchaser)	Released: January 20, 2020; Label: Self-released; Format: Digital download
Fenix Flexin Vol. 1	Released: July 1, 2021; Label: Atlantic; Format: Digital download, streaming
Fenix Flexin Vol. 2	Released: July 28, 2022; Label: Atlantic; Format: Digital download
Fenix Flexin Vol. 3	Released: December 14, 2023; Label: Hitmaker distribution; Format: Digital download, streaming
Bang Broz (with Mike Sherm)	Released: April 10, 2026; Label: Mike Sherm/Flexxd Up Ent; Format: Digital download, streaming

=== Extended plays ===
List of extended plays, with selected details and chart positions
Title	Details
Trapped It Out (with Rob Vicious)	Released: December 4, 2016; Label: Self-released; Format: Digital download
Tour Files (with Cypress Moreno)	Released: December 23, 2022; Label: Self-released; Format: Digital download, streaming

=== Singles ===
List of singles, showing year released and album name
Title	Year	Peak chart positions		Album
Title	Year	US	UK	Album
"10 Toes"	2021	—	—	Fenix Flexin Vol. 1
"For Me"	2021	—	—	Fenix Flexin Vol. 1
"NDS"	2021	—	—	Fenix Flexin Vol. 1
"Fire Drill" (with Louda Lou)	2021	—	—	Non-album single
"Fenix Flexin, Vol. 2 Intro"	2021	—	—	Fenix Flexin Vol. 2
"Slxvm Freestyle" (with Young Contra)	2022	—	—	Non-album single
"Dead Homies"	2022	—	—	Fenix Flexin Vol. 2
"One Call" (with Dj Flippp)	2022	—	—	Non-album single
"Like Dat" (with Cypress Moreno)	2022	—	—	Tour Files
"Apologies"	2023	—	—	Non-album singles
"Knew That" (with FBEAT)	2023	—	—	Non-album singles
"Bad Habit" (with Cypress Moreno and Zoe Osama)	2023	—	—	Non-album singles
"Kick Rocks" (with Mike Jay)	2023	—	—	Non-album singles
"Built Like That" (with Dj Flippp and Rob Vicious)	2023	—	—	Non-album singles
"Zack & Cody" (with Dj Flippp)	2023	—	—	Non-album singles
"Locked In" (with Dj Flippp)	2023	—	—	Non-album singles
"Lifestyle" (with Cypress Moreno)	2023	—	—	Non-album singles
"Money Dance" (with Dj Flippp)	2023	—	—	Non-album singles
"Dyin Bout It" (with Dj Flippp and Rob Vicious)	2023	—	—	Non-album singles
"Take Out" (with Dj Flippp, Master Kato & Warhol.SS)	2023	—	—	Non-album singles
"Blicky Blicky Tricky Tricky" (with Dj Flippp)	2024	—	—	Non-album singles
"Street Flexin" (featuring Street Active)	2024	—	—	Non-album singles
"Blade Runner"	2024	—	—	Back Flexin
"Daboii Flexin" (with Daboii)	2024	—	—	Back Flexin
"We Them" (with Cypress Moreno and J.I Bandz)	2024	—	—	Non-album singles
"Rubberz" (with Purps on the Beat)	2026	58	90	Non-album singles
