= 03 Greedo =

American rapper (born 1987)

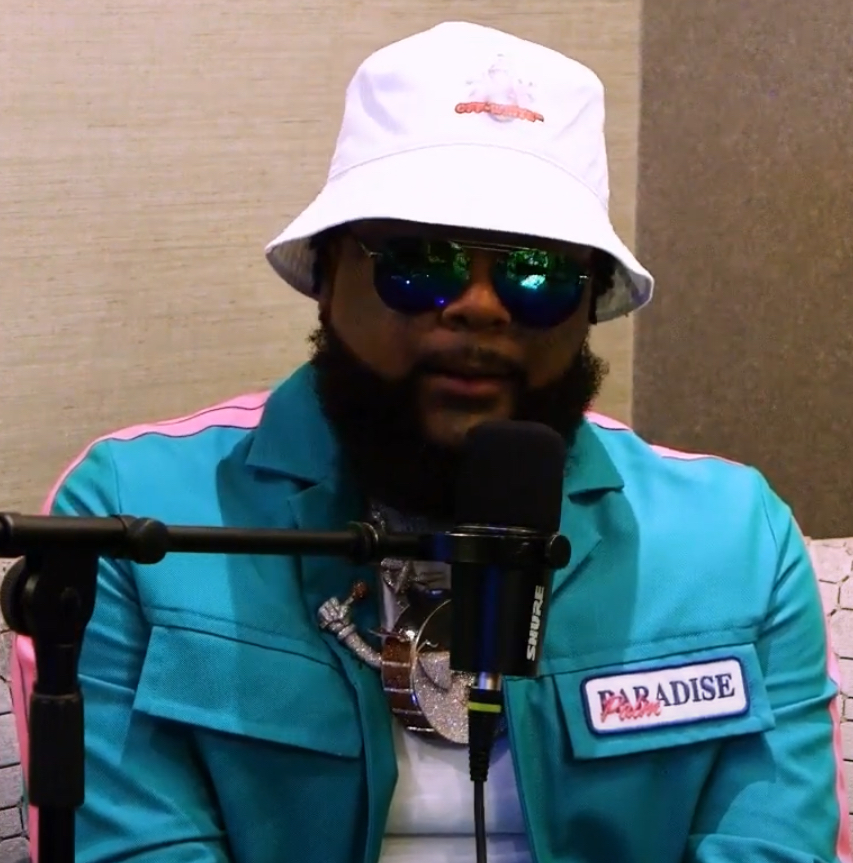
- 03 Greedo in 2023

Background information
- Also known as: Greedy Giddy
- Born: Jason Jamal Jackson; July 26, 1987 (age 39); Los Angeles, California, U.S.
- Genres: West Coast hip hop; trap; hip hop
- Occupations: Rapper; singer; songwriter; producer
- Instrument: Vocals
- Years active: 2010–present
- Labels: Golden Grenade Empire; Alamo

Jason Jamal Jackson (born July 26, 1987), known by his stage name 03 Greedo, is an American rapper, singer, songwriter, and record producer. He began to gain recognition for his Purple Summer mixtape series that started in 2016. He saw further attention with the release of his mixtape, The Wolf of Grape Street (2018). His debut studio album, God Level, was released on June 26, 2018.

In April 2018, Jackson was sentenced to 20 years in prison on drug trafficking and possession of a firearm charges. He began his prison sentence in late June 2018. On January 8, 2023, it was announced that 03 Greedo would be released from prison after a successful parole hearing in June 2022. He was released on January 12.

Since his release from prison, Jackson has continued his work as a recording artist - beginning with his fifth studio album Halfway There which was released 7 days after his parole.

== Early life ==
Jason Jamal Jackson was born in West Los Angeles, California, on July 26, 1987, to Michael and Lisa Jackson. In late 1988, when Jackson was only a year old, his father was killed in a motorcycle accident. This was shortly after his parents had purchased their home in Gardena, California, where Jackson was raised along with his brother and sister. He was the youngest of the three. Prior to his father's death, he and his family lived in Los Angeles, near the Chester Washington Golf Course. As a toddler, he had a series of ear infections, which resulted in a tympanostomy tube. In 2000, after a nomadic childhood - which included stops in St. Louis, Rural Kansas, Compton, and Sacramento - Jackson moved to the Jordan Downs Housing Projects in the Watts neighborhood of Los Angeles. After a period of delinquency, Jackson was expelled from school, prompting his mother to kick him out of the house. After this, he oscillated between periods of homelessness and time spent staying with various friends or the family of his girlfriend. At age 17, Jackson was expecting a baby with his high school girlfriend. He worked various retail jobs and sold his own beats in anticipation of supporting his child – a daughter who was born after they turned 18 – and her mother. Soon after, he began to sell drugs to support his family. When he was 19, he pled no contest to a pair of misdemeanor gun possession charges and served 10 months of a one-year sentence.

== Career ==
Jackson initially used the alias Greedy Giddy, under which he self-produced six mixtapes, including the Bipolar series, Everybody Weak, and Money, Powder, Regrets. His early career was heavily influenced by southern rap such as Lil Boosie, Jeezy, and Gucci Mane, as well as Phil Collins. This early work is fragmented with a handful of recordings on DatPiff, YouTube, and Tumblr.

As Greedy Giddy, Jackson released numerous tracks to SoundCloud between 2014 and 2016. In 2016, Jackson changed his name to 03 Greedo and self-produced two mixtapes, Purple Summer and Purple Summer 2: Sun Don't Shine. He also started his own label, Golden Grenade Empire, in 2016. In 2017, Jackson produced three mixtapes: Purple Summer 03: Purple Hearted Soldier, First Night Out, and Money Changes Everything.

In 2017, Jackson signed with Todd Moscowitz's Alamo Records for over a million-dollar contract. His first release on the label was The Wolf of Grape Street which dropped in March 2018.

Later in March, Greedo courted controversy by making disparaging remarks about deceased rapper Tupac Shakur in an interview with Billboard Magazine; stating, in part, "Tupac sucks [...] He's delusional. He's a great actor. Part of his music shit was acting." When asked about the comments and the ensuing controversy in a later interview with Genius, Jackson stated that while the comments were taken out of context and he does enjoy some of Shakur's music, he did not feel a need to apologize as he feels Shakur's music is "not authentic" in contrast to his own.

Before turning himself into authorities, Jackson promised to make a vault of 30 albums; he then said he had finished over 3,000 songs before beginning his 20-year sentence. The day before he turned himself in, Jackson released his debut album God Level.

On July 5, 2019, Jackson and Blink-182 drummer Travis Barker released a joint EP, Meet the Drummers.

In September 2019, Jackson and Kenny Beats released a new album titled Netflix & Deal.

03 Greedo's eighth album, Load It Up Vol. 01, was released on August 14, 2020. It was preceded by the single "Drip Keep Going", featuring Key Glock.

On February 4, 2022, Jackson released a new single titled "Pourin" featuring Mike Free and BlueBucksClan on Alamo Records via Sony Music Entertainment. Almost a year later, on January 9, 2023, Jackson released the Mike Free–produced mixtape Free 03, which included the single.

After being released from prison in early 2023, he started recording lots of new songs, and on March 17, 2023, he released "Bacc Like I Never Left", the first of two singles from his fifth studio album Halfway There, which was released 7 days later.

== Personal life ==
One of Jackson's most distinctive features is the term "Living Legend" tattooed on his face.

In 2016, Jackson was arrested in Texas on drug trafficking and possession of a firearm charges. According to a police report, Potter County Sheriff deputies forced open his car's trunk after claiming to smell cannabis and found "four pounds of methamphetamine and two stolen pistols." Jackson originally faced a sentence of 300 years for the charges. However, he eventually took a plea deal and was sentenced to 20 years in prison, though he could be released in five years with good behavior. He began his sentence in the summer of 2018 and was imprisoned at the Middleton Unit. In 2022, he was moved to the William R. Boyd Unit. He was initially set to become eligible for parole in July 2020, but this was denied in 2020 and 2021. Jackson was granted parole release in June 2022 upon completion of a prerelease program. On January 12, 2023, Jackson was released.

In 2019, while in prison, Jackson earned his GED diploma.

== Discography ==
=== Studio albums ===
Title	Album details
God Level	Released: June 27, 2018; Label: Alamo Records, Sony Music Entertainment; Format: Digital download, streaming
Still Summer In The Projects	Released: April 19, 2019; Label: Alamo Records, Sony Music Entertainment; Format: Digital download, streaming
Netflix & Deal (with Kenny Beats)	Released: November 22, 2019; Label: Alamo Records, Sony Music Entertainment; Format: Digital download, streaming
Load It Up Vol 01 (with Ron-RonTheProducer)	Released: August 14, 2020; Label: Alamo Records, Sony Music Entertainment; Format: Digital download, streaming
Halfway There	Released: March 24, 2023; Label: Alamo Records, Sony Music Entertainment; Format: Digital download, streaming
Hella Greedy (with Helluva)	Released: October 17, 2024; Label: Alamo Records, Sony Music Entertainment; Format: Digital download, streaming

=== Mixtapes ===
- Bi-polar Disc One (2010)
- Bi-polar Disc Two (2010)
- Bi-polar 3 (2011)
- Bi-polar 4 (2011)
- Money, Powder, Regrets (2012)
- Everybody Weak (2012)
- Purple Summer (2016)
- Purple Summer 2: Sun Don't Shine (2016)
- Purple Summer 03: Purple Hearted Soldier (2017)
- First Night Out (2017)
- Money Changes Everything (2017)
- The Wolf of Grape Street (2018)
- Free 03 (with Mike Free) (2023)
- Project Tpain (with Dnyc3) (2023)
- Y'all Ni99az Owe Me Money (with Ricky Racks) (2024)
- Crip I'm Sexy (2024)
- Album Inna Day (2024)
- All I Ever Wanted Was A Bankroll (with Tyler Hooks) (2024)
- 2025 The Streetz Is Over Wiit (2025)

=== Extended plays ===
- Porter 2 Grape (with Nef the Pharaoh) (2018)
- Meet the Drummers (with Travis Barker) (2019)
- 03 Inna Key (2021)
- Feed The Wolves (2023)
- Fucc Everybody (2024)
- Ear To Ear (2024)
- Another Night Out (2025)
