= OhGeesy =

American rapper (born 1993)

- Born: Alejandro Lloyd Carranza; November 27, 1993 (age 32)
- Origin: Los Angeles, California, U.S
- Genres: West Coast hip-hop; trap
- Occupations: Rapper; songwriter
- Years active: 2012–present
- Labels: 300; Atlantic (formerly)
- Member of: Shoreline Mafia

Alejandro Lloyd Carranza (born November 27, 1993), known professionally as OhGeesy, is an American rapper from Los Angeles. He is noted as a founding member of the hip hop group Shoreline Mafia. In 2021, with the band's apparent disbandment, OhGeesy shifted towards a solo career with the release of his debut solo album Geezyworld which peaked at number 102 on the Billboard 200.

In 19 June 2024, he performed the song "Geekaleek" along with Fenix Flexin, for Kendrick Lamar's concert The Pop Out: Ken & Friends at the Kia Forum in Inglewood, California, during the first set by DJ Hed, titled the Act I – DJ Hed & Friends. He released a song called "Candy Paint" in January 2026, featuring PayGotti.

== Career ==
=== Shoreline Mafia ===
OhGeesy started rapping alongside members of Shoreline Mafia in 2012. He met member Fenix Flexin while doing graffiti in Los Angeles. In 2016, Shoreline Mafia became a fully-formed rap group, with Rob Vicious and Master Kato joining the lineup.

=== Solo career ===
In February 2021, OhGeesy appeared on American rapper Drakeo the Ruler's single "For Real" and its subsequent music video alongside American rapper Ketchy the Great. In May 2021, he released his single "Get Fly" with American rapper DaBaby alongside a music video directed by Austin Simkins. In July 2021, he released the music video for his track "Big Bad Wolf", a collaboration with American rapper YG. In August 2021, he released his debut solo album Geezyworld with appearances from A Boogie wit da Hoodie, DaBaby, YG, Central Cee, BlueBucksClan, and Moe Faygoo.

== Personal life ==
As he previously said in numerous interviews, Ohgeesy is Mexican as both of his parents are of Mexican origin. Carranza became a father in March 2019.

In October 2021, during an interview with HipHopDX, Carranza spoke about his struggle with drug addiction and how it almost caused him to retire from music.

Carranza supported Donald Trump's 2024 presidential campaign.

== Discography ==
=== Studio albums ===
List of studio albums, with selected details and chart positions
Title	Studio album details	Peak chart positions
Title	Studio album details	US
Geezyworld	Released: August 27, 2021; Label: Atlantic; Format: CD, digital download, streaming	102
Geezyworld 2	Released: May 5, 2023; Label: Atlantic; Format: CD, digital download, streaming	—
Trophies (with Berner)	Released: December 8, 2023; Label: Bern One Entertainment, Empire; Format: Digital download, streaming	—
Paid N Full	Released: February 13, 2025; Label: 300; Format: Digital download, streaming	—

=== Singles ===
List of singles showing year released, chart positions and album name
Title	Year	Peak chart positions			Certifications	Album
Title	Year	US	US R&B/HH	US Rap	Certifications	Album
"Get Fly" (with DaBaby)	2021	—	—	—	RIAA: Gold	GEEZYWORLD
"GEEKALEEK" (with Cash Kidd)	2023	—	—	—	RIAA: Platinum	GEEZYWORLD 2
"Heat Stick" (with Fenix Flexin of Shoreline Mafia)	2024	97	27	22	RIAA: Gold	Paid N Full
"—" denotes a title that did not chart, or was not released in that territory.
