= Orange Calderon =

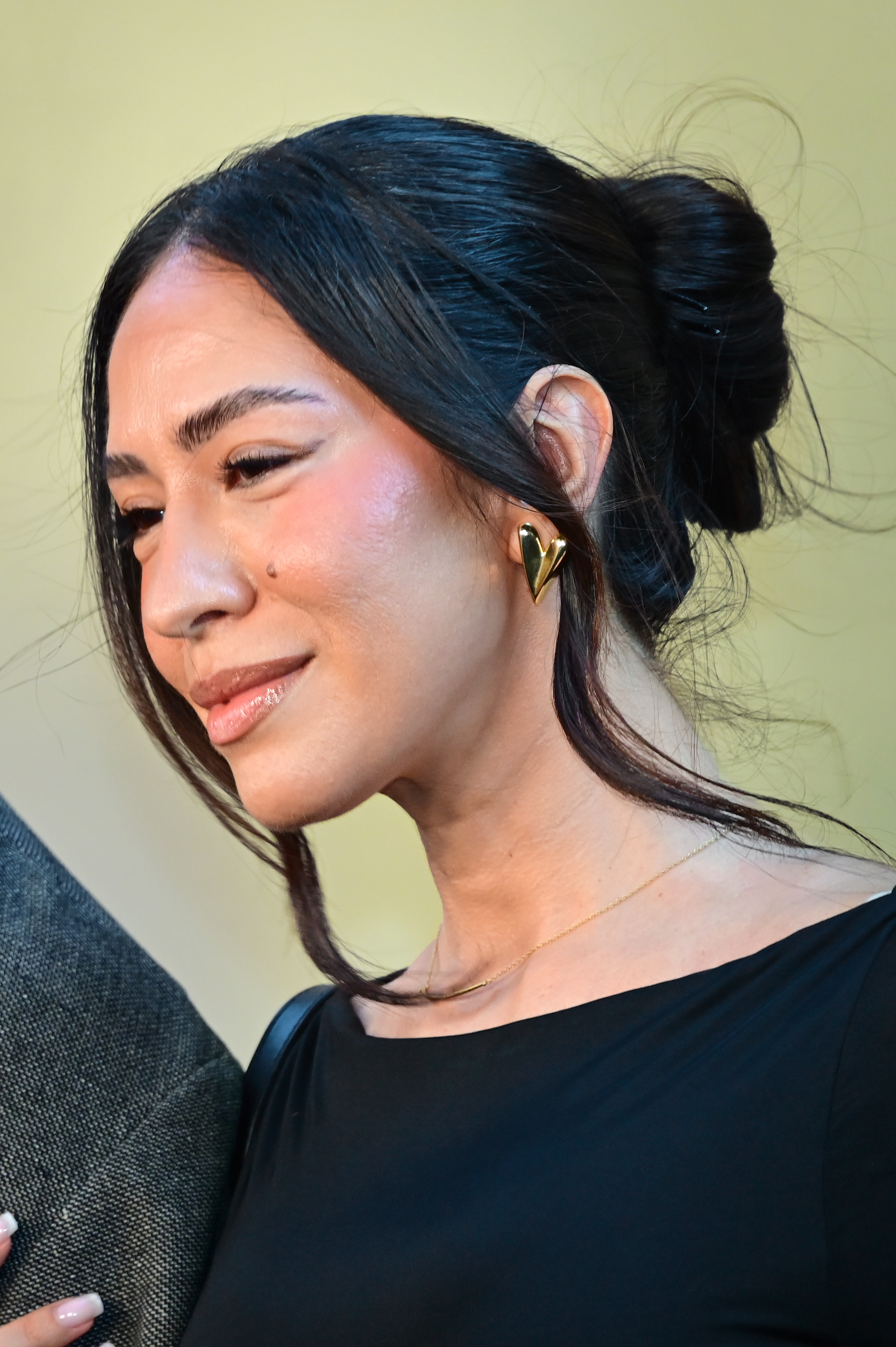
- Calderon in 2026

Background information
- Also known as: Calderón, DJ OJ, Orange
- Born
- Genres: Hip-hop, Dance, Trap, R&B
- Occupations: Disc jockey, Actress, Entrepreneur
- Instruments: Serato, Turntables
- Years active: 2014–present
- Website: http://orangecalderon.com

Orange Calderón is an American artist, actress, record producer, and disc jockey (DJ). She also goes by the monikers DJ Orange Calderón, DJ OJ or Orange. She is currently living in Los Angeles, California. She took home the 1st place prize of the annual "Flavor Battle" DJ competition. This made her the first female winner of a national DJ competition in America. in December 2016. McDonald's and Complex Media sponsors the Flavor Battle competition.

== Early life ==
Orange Calderon was born and raised in Houston, Texas. She is of Filipino-Basque and Mexican descent. Around age 13, she began experimenting with record production. Calderon studied for a short period at New York's Parsons School of Design.

Shortly after, she moved to Los Angeles. She attended The Fashion Institute of Design and Merchandising. She studied Apparel Industry Management during her tenure there. She graduated in June 2011. She began working with several companies as an Account Manager and Branding/Marketing Consultant.

== Career ==
In June 2014 Orange began DJing notable parties in Los Angeles & tour DJing for Chuck Inglish. In October 2014, she opened for Outkast's private performance at the Best Buy Theatre. That performance was during Ad Week in New York City. In September 2014, she release a chopped remix of Travis Scott's "Drugs You Should Try It". That release has since garnered over 5.6 Million plays.

By March 2015, she was playing international venues in Cardiff, Wales, Paris, and The LOW Festival in Nantes, France. She's headlined gigs in staple markets including Toronto, Los Angeles, Manhattan, Nashville, Cambridge, Boston, Miami, Houston, Austin, San Diego & Orange County.

In January 2016, she opened for Skrillex at the Ace Hotel Theatre in Los Angeles. In March 2016, she headlined a string of gigs in Africa beginning The Noir Party in Dar es Salaam, Tanzania. On December 17, 2016, she competed at McDonald's and Complex Media's annual "Flavor Battle" DJ competition. At the live finale in Atlanta, Georgia, celebrity judges, (Kid Capri, Kenny Burns, & DJ Infamous) named Orange champion. She claimed a prize of $10,000 and the National Title. Since Flavor Battle's start in 2009, Orange was the first woman to claim the title. Making her the first woman to win a National DJ Competition, in America.

She is the Host and DJ of her personal radio show ‘THE JUICE’ on YesJulz's 1AM Radio via DASH Radio. Guests have included Keith Powers, Justine Skye, Vince Staples, Anne-Marie, Jojo, Gnash, Maggie Lindemann, and Quincy Brown. She appeared as the Host DJ in several Season 1 episodes of VH1’s relaunch of the MTV2 original "Hip Hop Squares". DeRay Davis hosted the show. The show had an A-list Hip-Hop cast; guests included T.I., DJ Drama, Lil Duval, Wale, Yung Joc, Ray J, Monica (singer) etc. In 2015 and 2016, she curated music for SwimWeek Runway Shows in both Los Angeles and Miami.

In February 2017, she was among the DeLeón 100-a curated list of music industry trailblazers identified by Sean Combs. This list was a partnership between Billboard and DeLeón Tequila. She joined Digital Marketing Agency - Kitten Galore as a brand ambassador and social influencer in that same month.

In March 2017, she dropped a mix and was interviewed by Serato.

== Press ==
1. NiceKicks: My 5 - June 26, 2017
2. Vogue - June 1, 2017
3. LA Guest List - June 1, 2017
4. Serato - March 21, 2017
5. Miss Bish - January 8, 2017
6. Gypset Magazine - December 21, 2017
