= Dia Simms =

American business executive

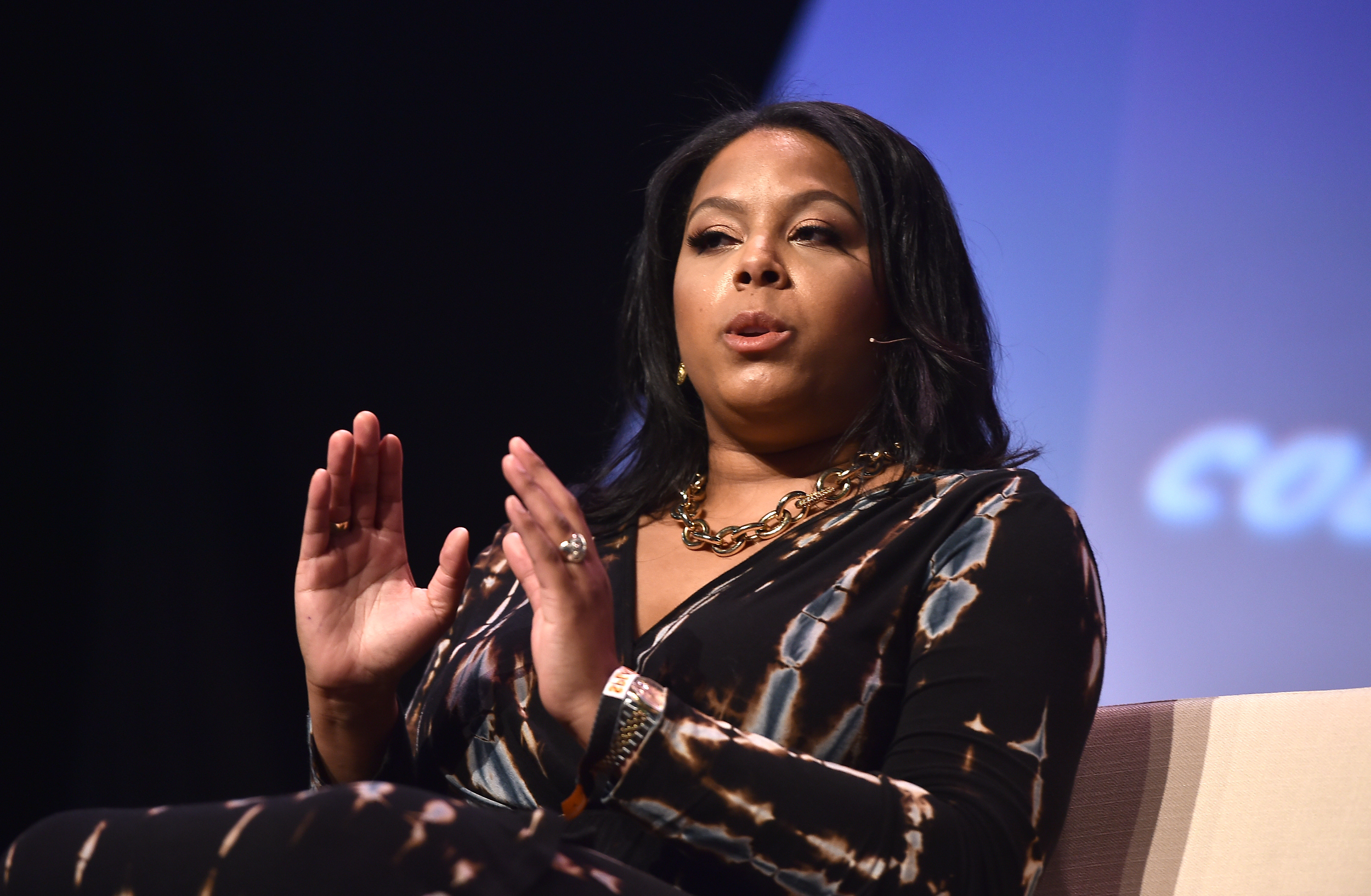
- Simms, May 2018
- Born: D'Angela Banks; Monterey, California, U.S.
- Education: Morgan State University (B.S., 1997); Florida Institute of Technology (M.S.); Defense Acquisition University
- Occupation: President of Combs Enterprises
- Children: 1
- Website: diasimms.com

D'Angela "Dia" Simms is an American business executive. In 2020, Simms became the co-founder of Pronghorn. She was previously the president of Combs Enterprises, a position she had held since May 15, 2017. Simms was appointed to this position by Combs Enterprises founder and CEO, Sean Combs, and was the first person to assume the role of president at the company.

As a native of Queens, New York, and now residing in Baltimore, Maryland, she is a graduate of Morgan State University, Maryland and the Florida Institute of Technology.

== Early life and education ==
Simms was born D'Angela Banks in Monterey, California. Her family moved to Queens, New York, when she was at an early age. While living there, she attended St. Francis Preparatory School. When Simms was nine years old, her mother was diagnosed with multiple sclerosis (MS). Her mother's resilience in the face of adversity would serve as a role model as she grew older.

In 1999, Simms attained a Bachelor's degree in Psychology (B.S.) from Morgan State University in Baltimore, Maryland. She attained her Master's degree in Management from Florida Institute of Technology and is Level II-certified by the Defense Acquisition University.

== Career ==
Simms began her career as a contract specialist at the U.S. Department of Defense. Following this, Simms moved into advertising and co-founded Madison Marketing Inc. She later worked in sales for GlaxoSmithKline and at Clear Channel, where two of her accounts were Bad Boy Records and Sean John. Simms started working for Combs as an assistant in 2005. She has also served as chief of staff, General Manager of The Blue Flame Agency, executive vice president and president of Combs Wine & Spirits. She was promoted to this role in February, 2015. As president of Combs Wines & Spirits, Simms was involved in the acquisition of DeLeón Tequila and its brand relaunch, as well as the brand growth of Cîroc vodka. She was promoted to president of Combs Enterprises on May 15, 2017, and is the first person in that role. She oversaw the company's various businesses, including Bad Boy Entertainment, Sean John, Combs Wine & Spirits (CÎROC Ultra Premium Vodka and DeLeón Tequila), AQUAhydrate, the Blue Flame advertising and marketing agency, Bad Boy Touring, Janice Combs Publishing, Revolt Films and Revolt TV, as well as ENYCE, and the Combs Foundation. Combs Wine & Spirits had been created in 2013 and folded into Combs Enterprises when Simms was promoted to president as she oversaw both ventures.

Simms notes that throughout her entire career, she has been in male-dominated industries. She has explained, "As a woman, it is important to feel like you can embrace your femininity — be ladylike and powerful simultaneously."

Simms left Combs Enterprises in September 2019 to enter into the cannabis industry and start her own business ventures. In October 2019, Simms spoke with Marie Claire on her venture into the cannabis industry with BRN Group.

Simms is also a board member for TILT Holdings and in 2020, she invested in the women-led Saint Liberty Whiskey.

== Honors ==
Simms was recognized by The Network Journal in their "40 Under Forty Class of 2010”. In 2011, she was an honoree at the United Way of New York City's "Power of Women Luncheon". Also in 2011, Simms was named a "Leader of the New School" by Essence Magazine. In 2014, Simms won the Bronze Stevie "Maverick of the Year Award" at the International Business Awards.

Simms is a member of Network for Teaching Entrepreneurship and serves on the board of the Boys and Girls Club of Harlem, the Women's Employment Opportunity Project, Grace Reformed Church, and Daddy's House Social Programs.

== Personal life ==
Simms married her husband, Keith, in 2007. They have one daughter. She lives with her family in Howard County, Maryland, and currently commutes weekly from her home to New York City to fulfill her work commitments.
