= Wanna Know =

Wanna Know may refer to:

- "Wanna Know", a song from the album Second Round's on Me by Obie Trice
- "Wanna Know", a song by UK rapper Dave remixed by Drake in 2016
- "Wanna Know" (Meek Mill song)
