= Back to Back (song) =

Single by Drake
- Released: July 29, 2015
- Recorded: 2015
- Genre: Trap
- Length: 2:50
- Label: Cash Money; Young Money; Republic
- Songwriters: Aubrey Graham; Jahmar Carter; Noah Shebib; Navraj Goraya
- Producers: Daxz; 40; Drake; Nav

Drake singles chronology
"Charged Up" (2015)	"Back to Back" (2015)	"Hotline Bling" (2015)

"Back to Back" is a diss track by Canadian rapper Drake directed at American rapper Meek Mill during their 2015 feud. Released on July 29, 2015, it was the second diss track released by Drake in the feud, following "Charged Up". The song was described as a "bouncier freestyle" than the latter track.

The song saw critical and commercial success, peaking at number 21 on the US Billboard Hot 100 and being nominated for Best Rap Performance at the 58th Grammy Awards. Drake performed both "Charged Up" and "Back to Back" live at OVO Fest 2015.

== Cover art ==
The album's cover art is a still of game 6 of the 1993 World Series, when former professional baseball player Joe Carter of the Toronto Blue Jays famously hit a walk-off home run to win the series against the Philadelphia Phillies. The Blue Jays repeated as World Series champions, becoming the first MLB franchise founded after 1903, and 7th overall, to win back-to-back titles.

== Background ==
=== Meek Mill–Drake beef ===
On July 22, 2015, Meek Mill publicly criticized Drake on Twitter after being upset with the latter's lack of involvement with the promotion of his sophomore album Dreams Worth More Than Money, claiming that Drake had used ghostwriters to write his verse on "R.I.C.O.", and then releasing the reference track to the song. Following this, Drake released two diss songs within a week, "Charged Up" and "Back to Back", both aimed at Meek Mill.

The song's title references the Toronto Blue Jays', Drake's hometown team, winning back-to-back World Series championships in 1992 and 1993. They won their second consecutive championship by defeating the Philadelphia Phillies, Meek Mill's hometown team, in the 1993 World Series. Joe Carter, who hit the walk-off home run that ended the series, is depicted on the single's cover.

=== Release ===
The song was released on July 29, 2015, the same day that the Blue Jays and Phillies played against each other. It also is a reference to the Back-to-Back release of diss tracks. Meek Mill later responded with another diss song about Drake, titled "Wanna Know". Meek Mill later removed his diss to Drake on SoundCloud.

== Commercial performance ==
"Back to Back" debuted and peaked at number 27 on the Billboard Canadian Hot 100. The song also debuted and peaked at number 21 on the Billboard Hot 100, with its chart entrance fueled by 122,000 first-week digital download sales and 4.5 million streams. As of September 2015, "Back to Back" has sold 253,000 copies in the United States. The song is 2× platinum per the Recording Industry Association of America (RIAA).

== Cultural significance and aftermath ==
A different version of the song with humorous lyrics was used in the Saturday Night Live skit "Drake's Beef", in the May 14, 2016 show (Season 41, Episode 20), which Drake performed on and hosted.

After the two rappers repaired their relationship, they went on to release the collaboration "Going Bad" in 2018. Meek Mill shouted out "Back to Back" in the verse, with the line "Me and Drizzy back-to-back, it's gettin' scary" followed by an ad-lib of "Back-to-Back!". Meek Mill also freestyled over the "Back to Back" beat during a December 2018 appearance on Funkmaster Flex’s Hot 97 radio show.

=== Legacy ===
In a 2024 list of the 50 best diss tracks in hip-hop history, Complex put "Back to Back" at #8, saying it "builds to raucous moments that serve as death blows to Meek Mill and also creates club-ready bellow-along-with-your-boys moments—it’s genius". The song was also referenced by American rapper Kendrick Lamar during the Drake-Kendrick Lamar feud on his single "Euphoria".

Following the 2025 World Series where the Los Angeles Dodgers defeated the Toronto Blue Jays, ESPN posted a photo recreating the cover with the Dodgers on field celebrations, referencing both the feud between Drake and Lamar as well as the fact the Dodgers had won the previous year.

== Personnel ==
All are credited as songwriters. Adapted from TIDAL and comments to Genius.

- Daxz – producer
- Drake – co-producer, vocals
- 40 – co-producer
- Nav – producer, chords

== Charts ==
=== Weekly charts ===
Chart (2015)	Peak position
Canada (Canadian Hot 100)	27
France (SNEP)	152
UK Singles (Official Charts)	77
US Billboard Hot 100	21
US Hot R&B/Hip-Hop Songs (Billboard)	8
US Hot Rap Songs (Billboard)	1

=== Year-end charts ===
Chart (2015)	Position
US Billboard Hot 100	99

== Certifications and sales ==
Region	Certification	Certified units/sales
Australia (ARIA)	Platinum	70,000^{‡}
United Kingdom (BPI)	Gold	400,000^{‡}
United States (RIAA)	2× Platinum	2,000,000^{‡}
^{‡} Sales+streaming figures based on certification alone.
