= Charged Up =

Single by Drake
- Released: July 27, 2015
- Recorded: July 2015
- Genre: Cloud rap; freestyle
- Length: 3:10
- Label: Cash Money; Young Money; Republic
- Songwriters: Aubrey Graham; Noah Shebib; Adam Feeney; Maneesh Bidaye
- Producers: 40; Bidaye; Frank Dukes

Drake singles chronology
"Where Ya At" (2015)	"Charged Up" (2015)	"Back to Back" (2015)

"Charged Up" is a song by Canadian rapper Drake. It is the first of two diss tracks aimed at American rapper Meek Mill by Drake. At OVO Fest 2015, Drake performed this song and "Back to Back" live.

== Background ==
On July 22, 2015, Meek Mill publicly criticized Drake on Twitter after being upset with Drake's non-involvement with the promotion of his album Dreams Worth More Than Money, claiming that he used ghostwriters to write his verse on "R.I.C.O." Following this, Drake released two diss songs within a week, "Charged Up" and "Back to Back", both aimed at Meek Mill. Meek Mill later responded with another diss song about Drake, titled "Wanna Know". Meek Mill later removed his diss to Drake on SoundCloud.

== Track listing ==
Digital download

1. "Charged Up" – 3:10

=== Personnel ===
All are credited as songwriters. Adapted from TIDAL.

- Maneesh – production
- 40 – production
- Frank Dukes – keyboards
- Drake – vocals

== Charts ==
=== Commercial performance ===
"Charged Up" debuted and peaked at number 75 on the Billboard Canadian Hot 100. The song also debuted and peaked at number 78 on the Billboard Hot 100.

=== Weekly charts ===
Chart (2015)	Peak position
Canada Hot 100 (Billboard)	75
US Billboard Hot 100	78
US Hot R&B/Hip-Hop Songs (Billboard)	21

== See also ==
- List of notable diss tracks
