= Virginia Black Whiskey =

Brand of American Bourbon whiskey

Virginia Black
- Type: Whiskey
- Origin: United States
- Introduced: 2016
- Website: Virginia Black website

Virginia Black is a brand of American Bourbon whiskey.

== History ==
Virginia Black is a collaboration between Brent Hocking and Drake. It is distributed in the United States by Proximo Spirits and is available in Canada, the U.K., Ghana, Kenya, Rwanda, Tanzania, Zanzibar, Burundi, Uganda, and United Arab Emirates. It is also available in Australia.

Virginia Black made headlines for its record-breaking debut at the Liquor Control Board of Ontario (LCBO) in Ontario, Canada. Virginia Black sold a record 1,779 bottles on the day it was released and went on to sell 4,650 bottles in its first week. It also sold 30,000 cases in its first year.

== Production ==
Virginia Black is a "personally selected collection of two, three, and four-year old Bourbon Whiskey focused on a high-rye content and finished with a decadent profile." It has 40% ABV (80 proof).
