= Brent Hocking =

American entrepreneur

- Occupation: Entrepreneur
- Known for: Founder of DeLeón Tequila, Co-founder of Virginia Black Whiskey

Brent Hocking is an American entrepreneur. He is the founder of DeLeón Tequila, which he launched in 2009, and Virginia Black Whiskey, which he co-founded with Drake in 2016. Hocking grew up in Compton, California, and has lived in Southern California for most of his life.

Hocking left his job in mortgage lending in 2006 to start his own brand of tequila, which later became known as DeLeón Tequila. Hocking bought a distillery in Jalisco, Mexico and launched the brand in 2009. Hocking sold the brand to Diageo and Sean Combs in 2014 for an undisclosed amount. Hocking is the co-founder of Virginia Black Whiskey, a venture he launched with Drake in 2016.
