= Wanna Know (Meek Mill song) =

Song by Meek Mill
- Released: July 31, 2015
- Recorded: 2015
- Genre: Hip hop
- Length: 4:03
- Label: Dream Chasers
- Songwriters: Robert Williams; Orlando Tucker
- Producers: Jahlil Beats; Swizz Beatz

"Wanna Know" is a song by American rapper Meek Mill. The track was released on July 31, 2015, as a diss track to Canadian rapper Drake. "Wanna Know" was produced by Jahlil Beats and Swizz Beatz.

== Background and release ==
On July 22, 2015, Meek Mill publicly criticized Drake on Twitter after being upset with Drake's non-involvement with the promotion of his album Dreams Worth More Than Money, claiming that he used ghostwriters to write his verse on "R.I.C.O.", and then releasing the reference track to the song. After that, in late July 2015, Drake released two diss tracks aimed at Meek Mill, "Charged Up" and "Back to Back". Meek then replied with "Wanna Know". Meek Mill later removed his diss to Drake on SoundCloud.

=== Legal actions ===
In August 2015, there were rumors speculating that professional wrestler The Undertaker filed a lawsuit against Meek Mill for using a part of his entrance theme as a sample for "Wanna Know". However, a WWE spokesperson stated that "WWE takes its intellectual property rights very seriously, and we're looking into the matter", with WWE concerned that Meek Mill did not respect such property rights. Mill later received a cease and desist letter from WWE chairman Vince McMahon to that point.

=== Removal from SoundCloud ===
"Wanna Know" was first uploaded to SoundCloud, but Meek later removed the track from SoundCloud. Later, a post on Instagram was created by Meek that appeared to show that he was moving on from his "war on Drake".
