= DeLeón Tequila =

Alcoholic beverage brand

- Type: Tequila
- Country of origin: Mexico
- Introduced: 2009
- Website: DeLeón Tequila

DeLeón Tequila is a brand of the alcoholic beverage tequila owned by Diageo. It is certified as 100% blue Weber agave tequila. DeLeón is produced in the town of Purísima del Rincón in the Mexican state of Guanajuato. The city name literally translates to "Purest of the Corner" and the town is named after the Immaculate Conception.

The brand was founded by Brent Hocking in 2008 and purchased in 2013 by Sean "Puff Daddy" Combs and the beverages giant Diageo as equal ownership partners. The joint ownership was terminated in 2024 after a legal dispute, leaving Diageo the sole owner.

== History ==
DeLeón Tequila was founded by Brent Hocking in 2008. It was first introduced to the U.S. market on Cinco de Mayo 2009. DeLeón Tequila does not use any of the four allowed additives (glycerin, sucrose, oak extract and caramel) that are permitted under Mexican tequila regulations.

In December 2013 it was announced that Sean "Puff Daddy" Combs would become a partner of DeLeón Tequila following the success of his work with the Cîroc vodka brand. A few weeks later it emerged that Combs had in fact co-purchased DeLeón Tequila in partnership with Diageo, with whom he had worked with on growing Cîroc. Following the purchase Diageo and Combs each assumed 50% ownership of DeLeón Tequila.

In 2024, following a legal dispute, Combs ceased to be associated with the Diageo joint venture which owned DeLeón and Cîroc.

== Varieties ==
- Blanco: The DeLeón Blanco is named "Diamante" which translates to diamond in Spanish.
- Reposado: Reposado translates to resting and is known as the "quiet tequila" in Mexico.
- Añejo: The DeLeón Añejo is blended in French Sauternes wine barrels.
- Extra Añejo: The DeLeón Extra Añejo is the first and only "cask-strength" 102-proof tequila. Release date August 1, 2011.
- Leóna: This reserve is made from 100% pure blue Weber agave and uses Mexican water drawn from DeLeón's three natural spring wells. The tequila is distilled in the white glove facility of the DeLeón fabrica, then aged 34 months in Sauternes wine barrels. Presented in a limited edition black box with a python flask. Leóna retails for $825.00 (750 ML. 40% alcohol / VOL. 80 Proof).
