= Tam =

Tam or TAM may refer to:

== Biology ==
- TAM Mild Jalapeño, a chilli cultivar
- Thioacetamide, an organosulfur compound
- Tumor-associated macrophage, a class of immune cells
- Transparent Anatomical Manikin, an educational model

== Places ==
- TAM (theatre), a theatre in North Rhine-Westphalia, Germany
- Mount Tamalpais, California, known locally as Mount Tam
- Tainan Art Museum, a museum in Tainan, Taiwan
- Tamalpais High School, California, United States, often abbreviated as Tam
- Transantarctic Mountains, a mountain range in Antarctica which extends across the continent

== Technology ==
- Tanque Argentino Mediano, the main battle tank of Argentina
- Technological Association Malaysia, a learned society
- Technology acceptance model, an information systems theory
- Teen Age Message, interstellar radio transmissions
- Telecom Application Map
- Telephone answering machine
- Twentieth Anniversary Macintosh, a limited-edition personal computer released by Apple in 1997

== Transportation ==
- Tunas Antarnusa Muda, a bus and logistics company in Indonesia
- TAM Aviação Executiva, a Brazilian airline
- TAM – Transporte Aéreo Militar, Bolivian airline
- TAM Air, a Georgian airline
- TAM Airlines, now known as LATAM Brasil
- TAM 5 or The Spirit of Butts' Farm, the first model plane to cross the Atlantic Ocean
- Tovarna avtomobilov Maribor, a former Slovenian commercial vehicle manufacturer
- Toyota Astra Motor, an Indonesian automotive company
- Transport Asset Manager of New South Wales, an Australian government agency for railway assets
- Transports de l'Agglomération de Montpellier (TaM), a public transport company in France
- IATA airport code of General Francisco Javier Mina International Airport, Tampico, Mexico
- National Rail code of Tamworth railway station, England
- TAM Management, Georgia
- Tbilisi Aircraft Manufacturing, Georgia
- MTR station code of Tamar station, Hong Kong
- MRT station abbreviation of Tampines MRT station, Singapore

== Characters ==
- Tam Lin, in a Scottish Borders ballad
- Tam Sventon, a private detective in Swedish children's novels
- River Tam, in the Firefly television series
- Simon Tam, in the Firefly television series
- Tấm, in the Vietnamese fairy tale The Story of Tam and Cam
- Tam Song, in the Keeper of the Lost Cities series

== Other uses ==
- Tam (name), a list of people with the first name, nickname or last name
- Tam cap, a type of hat
- Tam o' shanter (cap), bonnet from Scotland
- Rastacap, Rastafarian cap also known as a tam
- TAM Media Research, an Indian television audience measurement company
- Cyclone Tam (2006)
- The Amaz!ng Meeting, conference on critical thinking
- Total addressable market, for a product or service
- Picul or tam, a traditional Asian unit of weight
- ISO 639-3 language code of the Tamil language
- Team Action Management, programme that Albert S. Humphrey was involved with
- Tense–aspect–mood (or Tense–aspect–mood–evidentiality, abbreviated as tame), refers to a group of grammatical categories in the study of linguistics.
- tāṃ, the seed syllable of Green Tara

== See also ==
- Tams (disambiguation)
- Tamtam (disambiguation)
