= Tams =

Tams may refer to:

- The Tams, an American vocal group
- Tams, West Virginia, United States, an unincorporated community
- Memphis Tams, former name (1972–1974) of the Memphis Sounds American basketball franchise based in Memphis, Tennessee
- John Tams (born 1949), English actor, singer, songwriter, composer and musician
- Tams Brig Stadium, former greyhound racing stadium in Scotland
- Theo Tams (born 1985), Canadian singer
- Willie Horace Thomas Tams (1891–1980), British lepidopterist and entomologist

TAMS or TamS may refer to:

- TamS, a theatre in Munich, Germany
- Texas Academy of Mathematics and Science, an early college entrance program
- Territory and Municipal Services Directorate (Australian Capital Territory), an agency of the Australian Capital Territory Government
- Total Airport Management Systems, an integrated computer system used at Kuala Lumpur International Airport
- Takeoff Acceleration Monitoring System, a less comprehensive version of Take-off performance monitoring systems (TOPMS).
- Token and Medal Society, a numismatic organization founded in 1960.

== See also ==
- TAM (disambiguation)
- Tamtam (disambiguation)
- Tam's Burgers, a restaurant chain based in Southern California
