= Murder of Kuah Bee Hong =

1991 child murder in Singapore

Kuah Bee Hong
- Kuah Bee Hong, pictured before death
- Born: Kuah Bee Hong; 1981; Singapore
- Died: 23 April 1991 (aged 10); Viking Road, Singapore
- Cause of death: Murdered by strangulation
- Resting place: An unnamed cemetery in Singapore
- Other names: Ah Muay
- Education: Primary Four at Keng Seng Primary School (incomplete due to her death)
- Occupation: Student
- Known for: Murder victim
- Parents: Kuah Chin Chye (father); Ng Siew Hua (mother)

On 23 April 1991, Kuah Bee Hong (Chinese: 柯美凤; Pe̍h-ōe-jī: Koa Bí-hōng), (Note: Her name was also spelt as Kuan Bee Hong in one source) a ten-year-old schoolgirl, was strangled to death at her Viking Road home by Goh Hong Choon (Chinese: 吴宏春; Pe̍h-ōe-jī: Gô͘ Hông-chhun), (Note: Also spelt as 吴鸿春 (Gô͘ Hông-chhun) or 吴丰春 (Gô͘ Hong-chhun)) a 25-year-old family friend of Kuah's family. Goh was found to have entered the home to commit robbery and silenced the girl, who was the only one present at her flat. Goh was charged with murder and he admitted to the robbery and strangulation; the motive for the murder was due to Goh wanting to get rid of possible witnesses for his crime and basically needed money to mitigate his financial situation. Goh was found guilty of the killing after a trial that lasted roughly two days, and he was executed for the crime three years later in July 1994.

== Murder and investigations ==
=== Death of Kuah Bee Hong ===
On the afternoon of 23 April 1991, at 3.30pm, 12-year-old Kuah Bee Leng (Chinese: 柯美玲; Pe̍h-ōe-jī: Koa Bí-lêng), who just returned from school to her flat at Bukit Merah's Viking Road, was shocked to discover her youngest sister Kuah Bee Hong, who was ten, lying dead with her body (clad in her school uniform) partially hidden under a sofa, with a bloodstained towel wrapped around her neck and a bleeding slash wound on her left wrist.

At that time her sister Bee Leng arrived home, Kuah's parents - hawker assistant Kuah Chin Chye (Chinese: 柯进财; Pe̍h-ōe-jī: Koa Chìn-châi; aged 41 in 1991) and electronics factory worker Ng Siew Hua (Chinese: 黄秀花; Pe̍h-ōe-jī: N̂g Siù-hoa; aged 40 in 1991) were working while her eldest sister was at school. Immediately, Bee Leng quickly ran down to the ground floor, seeking help from her uncle P. H. Koh and aunt who both operated a store. Koh called the police and both Kuah's parents, who were devastated to hear the news of her death. The school principal of the Kuah sisters' school also came to offer counselling help for Kuah's sister. According to her father, Kuah was last seen alive when she waved her father goodbye before he left the house to go to work.

Professor Chao Tzee Cheng, the senior forensic pathologist, conducted an autopsy of the victim, and he determined the cause of Kuah's death to be strangulation. Police also searched the flat and recovered a bloodstained knife from the kitchen sink. It was also established that robbery could be the possible motive, as there were cash and jewellery worth S$2,500 missing from the flat. The killer was suspected to be someone known to the victim, since there were no signs of forced entry into the flat, and the family, who described Kuah as someone who often avoid strangers, similarly shared the theory. Nearby the scene at the third floor's staircase, a bloodstained palmprint was discovered by the police. The police also sent a public notice for any witnesses to come forward if they had information about the case.

=== Arrest of Goh Hong Choon ===
Three days after the murder, on 26 April 1991, a 23-year-old odd-job labourer Goh Hong Choon was arrested in Yishun as a suspect behind the murder, and charged for the crime. Most of the jewellery and money stolen from Kuah's flat were also recovered from Goh's flat. Three pawn tickets, which Goh received after he pawned the stolen items at a pawnshop in Yishun were also seized as evidence.

It was revealed that Goh had a close relationship with the Kuah family, and also a gambling partner of Kuah's mother, as he often went to their flat to play cards, and he lived in the same block on the fourth floor while the Kuahs lived on the second floor. The Kuah sisters, including Kuah Bee Hong herself, looked up to him and called him "Ah Kor" (阿哥 A Gē). According to a news report, the Kuahs were shocked to hear that it was Goh, their most trusted family friend, who murdered Bee Hong, and when she heard the identity of her daughter Bee Hong's killer, Ng fainted.

== Murder trial ==
=== Cases of defence and prosecution ===
Goh Hong Choon, who pleaded not guilty to the murder of Kuah Bee Hong.

On 19 April 1993, Goh Hong Choon stood trial at the High Court for the murder of Kuah Bee Hong.

The trial court heard that Goh, who pleaded not guilty, made a confession to killing the girl. According to his confession, Goh stated that he arrived at the home of Kuah Bee Hong to look for her mother, as he wanted to borrow money from her to pay off the debts he owed to loan sharks. At that time, Kuah was the only person present at home, so he was allowed in to wait for Kuah's mother to return home. As he waited inside the flat, Goh formed an intention to rob the Kuah family of their valuables, but before he did so, he decided to kill Kuah in order to not allow her to testify as a witness. Goh firstly used a telephone cord wire to strangle Kuah before he subsequently used his bare hands to strangle Kuah until she became motionless. He further used a knife to slash her left wrist to make sure she bled to death before he ransacked the house, stealing the gold items and jewellery of the Kuah family. Before he escaped, Goh even wrapped a towel around Kuah's neck for fear his fingerprints could be discovered on her neck. Later on in the trial, Goh changed his account and claimed he only strangled Kuah just to knock her out rather than intending to kill her, and that he accidentally stabbed Kuah on the wrist although the blow was meant to struck somewhere else.

However, the confession was not consistent with the prosecution's version of how the killing was committed. The prosecution, led by Bala Reddy, sought from the judge to reject the defendant's account of the killing, as the forensic pathologist Chao Tzee Cheng had noted in his autopsy report that the victim was strangled with a soft fabric like a towel before her death, as he observed that there were no external marks or bruises on the neck to indicate that Goh used his hands or even a small string to strangle Kuah, and there was no damage to her larynx, which demonstrated that it was only possible that death occurred as a result of the use of ligature during strangulation. They also argued that since Goh intentionally strangled Kuah, which resulted in Kuah to suffocate to death as a result of his actions, there were sufficient grounds to return with a verdict of murder in Goh's case.

=== Verdict ===
The trial took place for about two-and-a-half days before it concluded on 21 April 1993. Judicial commissioner (JC) Kan Ting Chiu, who presided the trial hearing of the case, found that Goh had intentionally used the towel to strangle Kuah to death, and rejected the defendant's insistence that he used only his bare hands to strangle the girl before slashing her wrists, given that his testimony was inconsistent with the post-mortem findings of Professor Chao and hence accepted the prosecution's arguments. The judge also considered the possibility of someone else using the towel to strangle Kuah after Goh's escape from the scene but decided it was too remote a possibility to have occurred. He also pointed out that if Goh genuinely wanted to remove the fingerprints off Kuah's neck, he would have simply wiped them off the neck rather than tying the towel tightly around the unconscious Kuah's neck.

As such, 25-year-old Goh Hong Choon was guilty of murder, and sentenced to death. Goh was reportedly emotionless when the death sentence was passed.

== Victim's family's response ==
According to news reports, after the death penalty was pronounced upon Goh Hong Choon, Kuah Bee Hong's family and their relatives, who were present in the courtroom, all applauded the verdict and shouted angrily at Goh, condemning him as "worse than a beast" and proclaiming that "he deserved it".

The Kuah family and the victim's nanny, Ng Siang Lai, were interviewed regarding the case. They all expressed sadness over Kuah Bee Hong's murder, and they also revealed about how they knew the killer Goh, whom they formerly looked up as a neighbour and friend before his heinous crime. Ng, who babysat both Kuah and Goh since their respective births, said that Goh was a rather nice guy who never acted like a gangster or never shown any violence. Kuah Chin Chye, Kuah's father who knew Goh since the latter was eight or nine, said he often met up with him for chess or watch television at his flat, and he similarly described him as someone who had a "moderate temper". Madam Ng and Kuah's father described Kuah as an obedient girl who greeted her father and helped to do chores.

== Fate of Goh Hong Choon ==
On 21 February 1994, 26-year-old Goh Hong Choon appealed his conviction and death sentence at the Court of Appeal, with his defence counsel arguing that the trial judge Kan Ting Chiu was erred in rejecting Goh's version of how he killed the victim and sought to overturn the conviction, but the three judges - Chief Justice Yong Pung How, Judges of Appeal L P Thean and M Karthigesu - held that the trial judge had correctly rejected the defence's account of the murder and hence upheld the High Court's decision whilst rejecting Goh's appeal.

On 29 July 1994, 26-year-old Goh Hong Choon was hanged at Changi Prison, where the city state's death row inmates were held before their executions at the prison's gallows. On that same day, four more people, consisting of Ibrahim Masod for killing goldsmith Phang Tee Wah, Lee Teck Sang who stabbed and killed Singapore Polytechnic lecturer Tan Chin Liong, and two drug traffickers (one Singaporean and one Nigerian), were also executed at the same prison as Goh. In the aftermath of Goh's execution, Singaporean crime show Crimewatch re-enacted the Kuah Bee Hong case and it aired as the tenth and final episode of the show's annual season in December 1994. Professor Chao Tzee Cheng, who conducted the autopsy and solved the crime in real life, portrayed himself in the re-enactment.

== See also ==
- Capital punishment in Singapore
