= Not Like Us =

2024 diss track by Kendrick Lamar

Single by Kendrick Lamar
- Released: May 4, 2024
- Recorded: Early May 2024
- Genre: West Coast hip-hop
- Length: 4:34
- Label: Interscope
- Songwriters: Kendrick Lamar Duckworth; Dijon McFarlane; Mark Spears; Sean Momberger; Ray Charles
- Producer: Mustard

Kendrick Lamar singles chronology
"Meet the Grahams" (2024)	"Not Like Us" (2024)	"Squabble Up" and "TV Off" (2024)

Music video
- "Not Like Us" on YouTube

"Not Like Us" is a diss track by the American rapper Kendrick Lamar released amidst his highly publicized feud with the Canadian rapper Drake. It was released on May 4, 2024, through Interscope Records, less than 20 hours after Lamar's previous diss track "Meet the Grahams". A music video, directed by Dave Free and Lamar, was released on American Independence Day (July 4).

Primarily produced by Mustard, with additional work from Sounwave and Sean Momberger, "Not Like Us" is a hyphy-influenced West Coast hip-hop song with a prominent bassline, lively strings, and finger snaps. Lyrically, it continues the themes introduced in "Meet the Grahams". Lamar doubles down on allegations of Drake's sexual interest in minors and sexual misconduct. He also criticizes his cultural identity and relationships with artists based in Atlanta, Georgia, accusing him of exploiting them for street credibility and financial gain.

"Not Like Us" received acclaim from critics, who praised the production, songwriting, and Lamar's performance; they felt it solidified Lamar's victory, and is widely regarded as the feud's best track. "Not Like Us" broke numerous records on the streaming platform Spotify and peaked at number one in ten countries, while charting in the top ten in over 20 additional countries. Drake responded to "Not Like Us" with "The Heart Part 6", in which he denied Lamar's accusations, on May 5. In January 2025, Drake filed a lawsuit against Interscope's parent Universal Music Group (UMG), alleging that "Not Like Us" defamed him and that UMG and Spotify artificially inflated its popularity; the lawsuit was dismissed in October 2025.

"Not Like Us" won all five of its Grammy nominations at the 67th ceremony: Record of the Year, Song of the Year, Best Rap Performance, Best Rap Song, and Best Music Video. It is tied with the 5th Dimension's "Up, Up and Away" as the most-awarded song in Grammy history. Lamar first performed "Not Like Us" live on Juneteenth 2024 during The Pop Out: Ken & Friends, where he played it five consecutive times. He performed it when he headlined the Super Bowl LIX halftime show in February 2025 and throughout his Grand National Tour from April to October 2025.

== Background and release ==
American rapper Kendrick Lamar and Canadian rapper Drake have been engaged in a rap feud since August 2013. Tensions escalated in March 2024, following Lamar's surprise appearance on Future and Metro Boomin's single "Like That", which was perceived as a diss aimed at Drake and J. Cole over their track "First Person Shooter". Drake responded to Lamar's verse with the single "Push Ups" and the since-removed song "Taylor Made Freestyle". Lamar fired back with the songs "Euphoria" and "6:16 in LA".

Hours after "6:16 in LA" was released, Drake responded with the single "Family Matters", in which he accused Lamar of abusing his romantic partner, Whitney Alford, and alleged that one of his two children was fathered by his creative partner, Dave Free. Less than an hour later, Lamar responded with "Meet the Grahams", depicting Drake as an alleged sexual predator who runs a sex trafficking ring inside of his Toronto mansion, known as the Embassy, while fathering a secret daughter. "Not Like Us" was unexpectedly released on May 4, 2024, less than 24 hours after "Meet the Grahams" was published. The only prior marketing that the song received came from Anthony "Top Dawg" Tiffith, the head of Lamar's former record label Top Dawg Entertainment, who posted, "Dot, I see dead people" on Twitter approximately two hours before its premiere.

Like Lamar's previous releases during the feud, "Not Like Us" was initially released as a YouTube exclusive before Interscope Records serviced it to music streaming platforms several hours later. He reportedly removed the copyright claims for a limited time, effectively allowing the public to freely use the song even for commercial purposes. Universal Music promoted the song on radio airplay in Italy on May 10, 2024. A blended version of the studio recording with the live performance from the Pop Out: Ken & Friends impacted radio stations in California on July 11, 2024.

=== Cover art ===
The single's cover art shows a bird's-eye view of Drake's Toronto mansion from a Google Maps screenshot with 13 red markers placed on its roof, symbolizing the presence of registered sex offenders. Following the song's release, the mansion's Google Maps view was vandalized, with users creating landmarks on the mansion with names such as "Owned by Kendrick", "Kendrick's dog" and "A-Minor". Neighboring houses were similarly vandalized, with titles such as "Zesty Drake", "CertifiedKidLover" and "ChildMOE-Lester". A forest near the mansion was renamed to "Money Trees", referencing Lamar's 2012 song of the same name.

== Composition ==
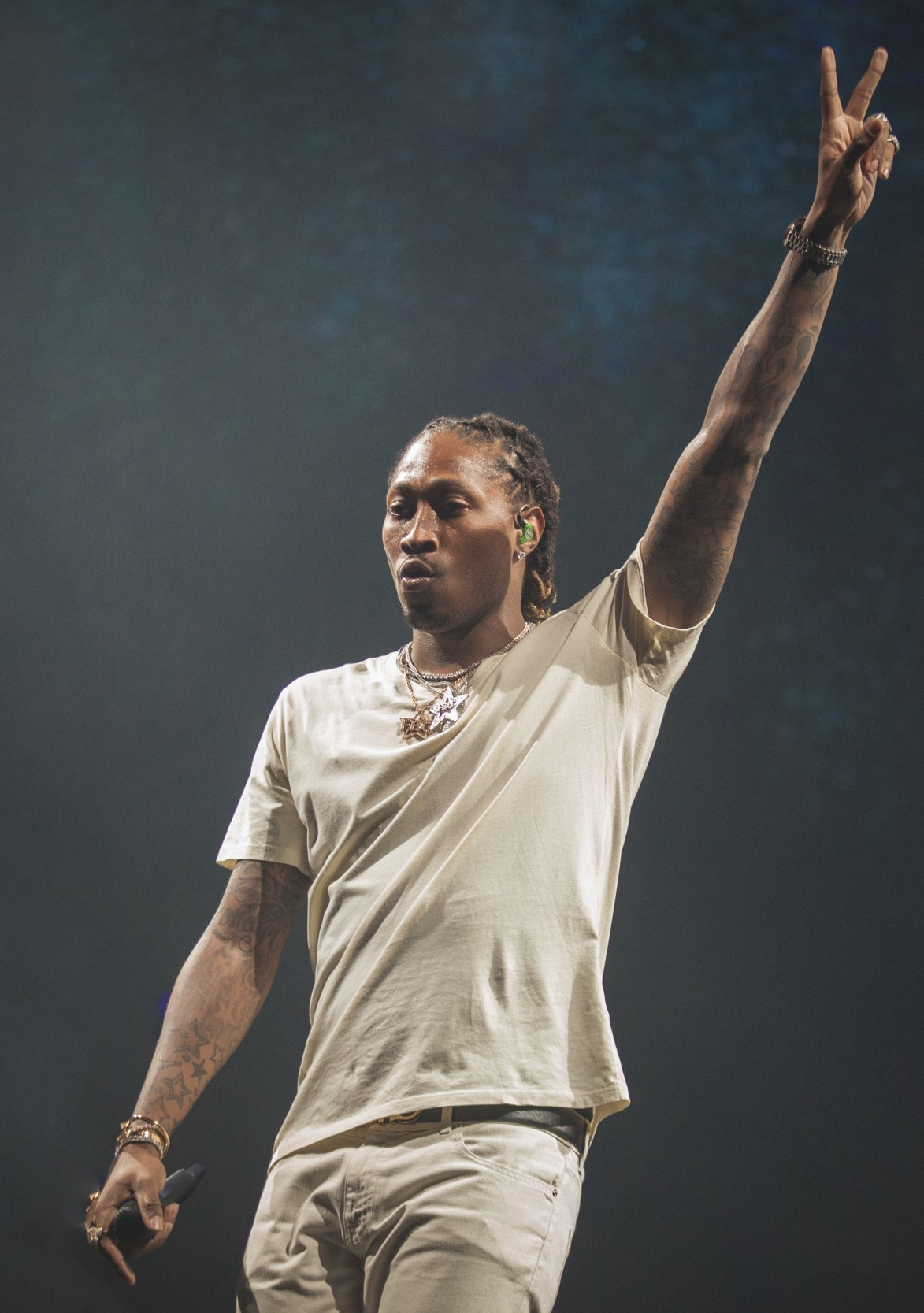
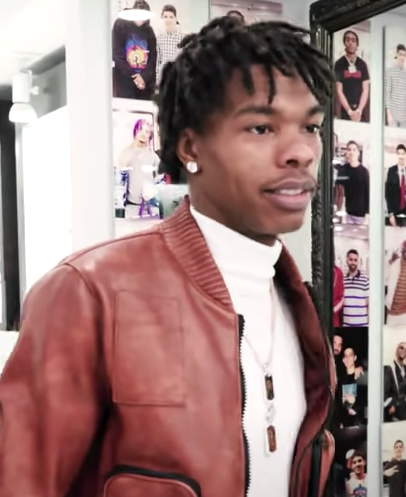
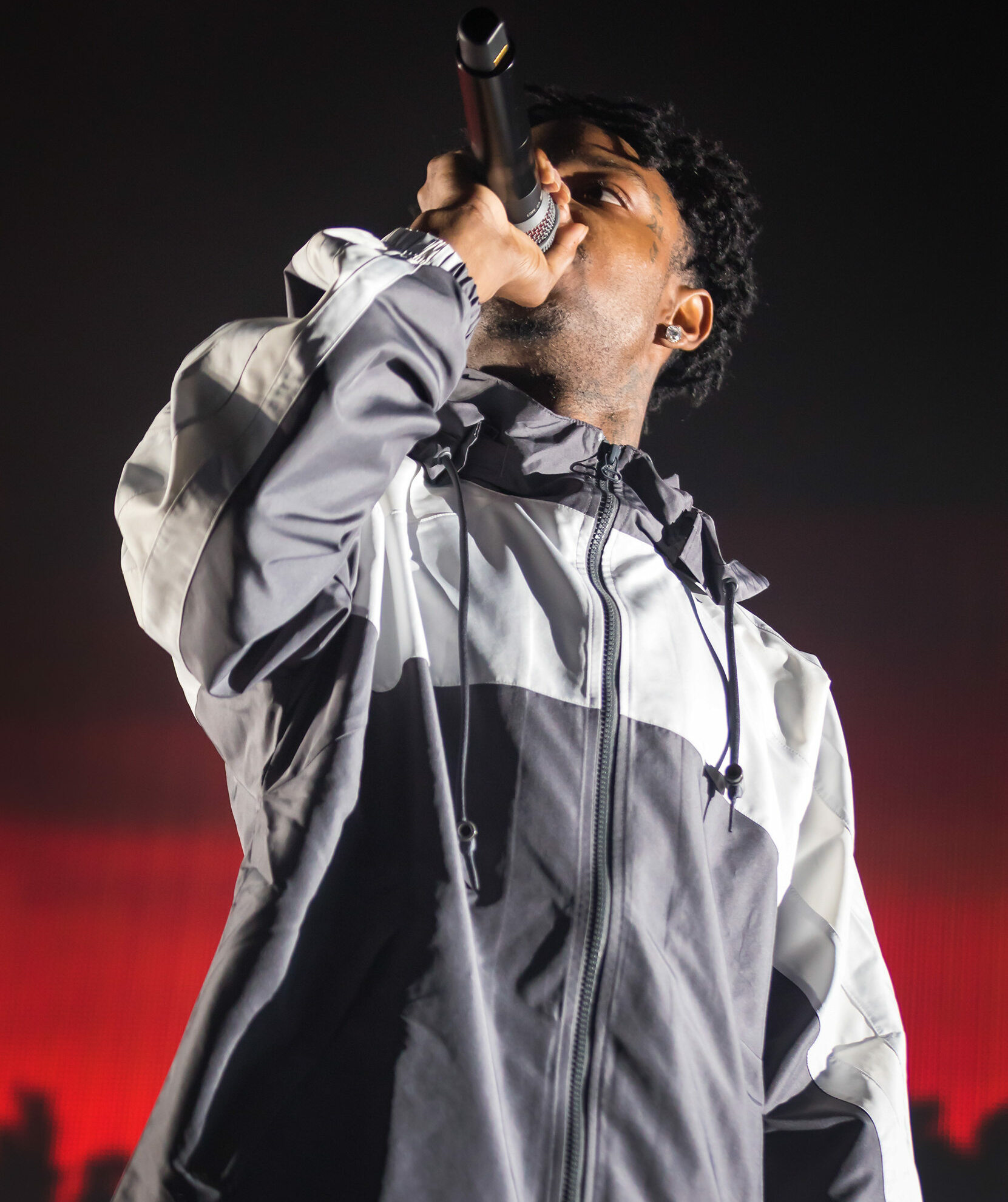
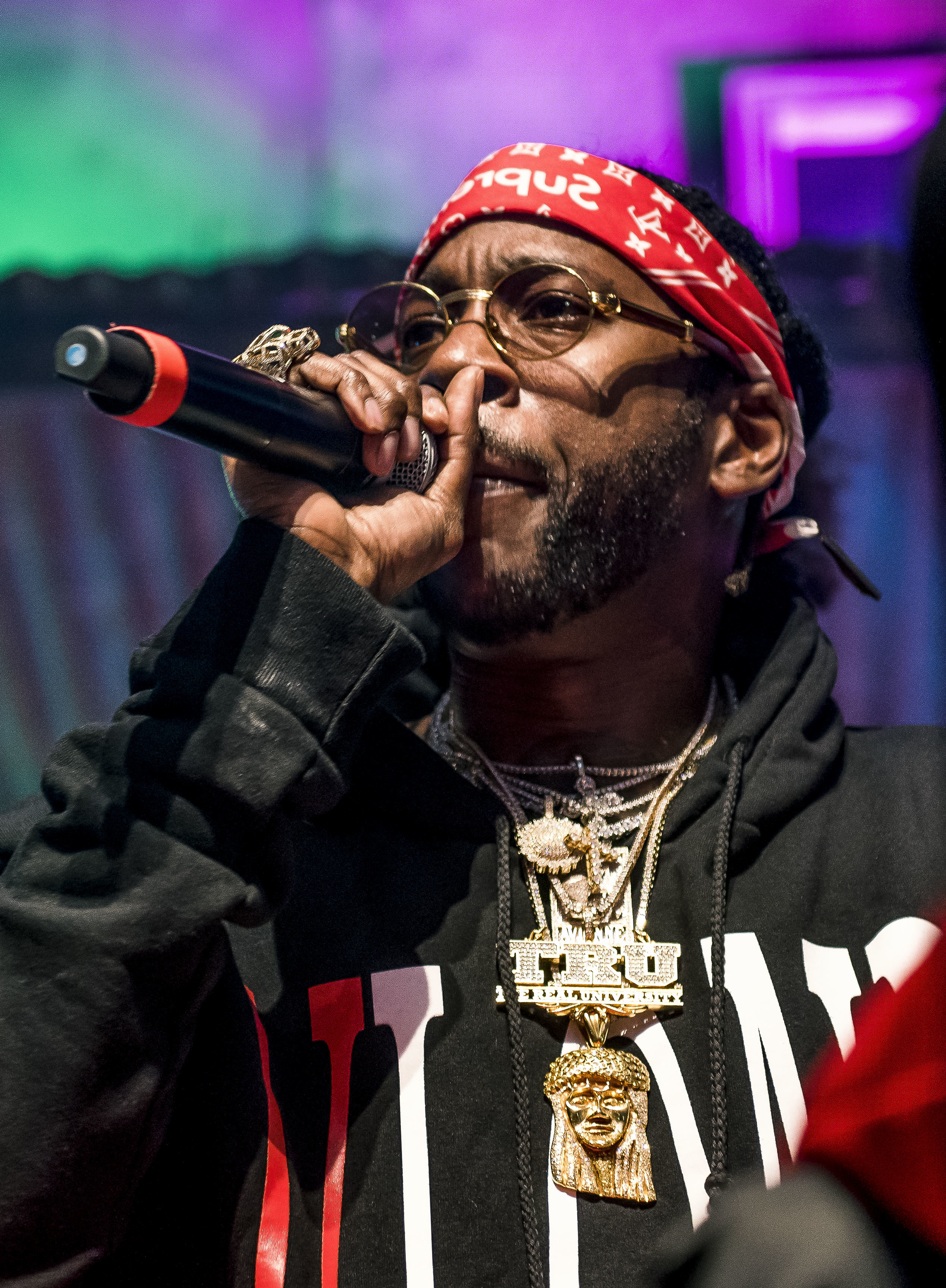
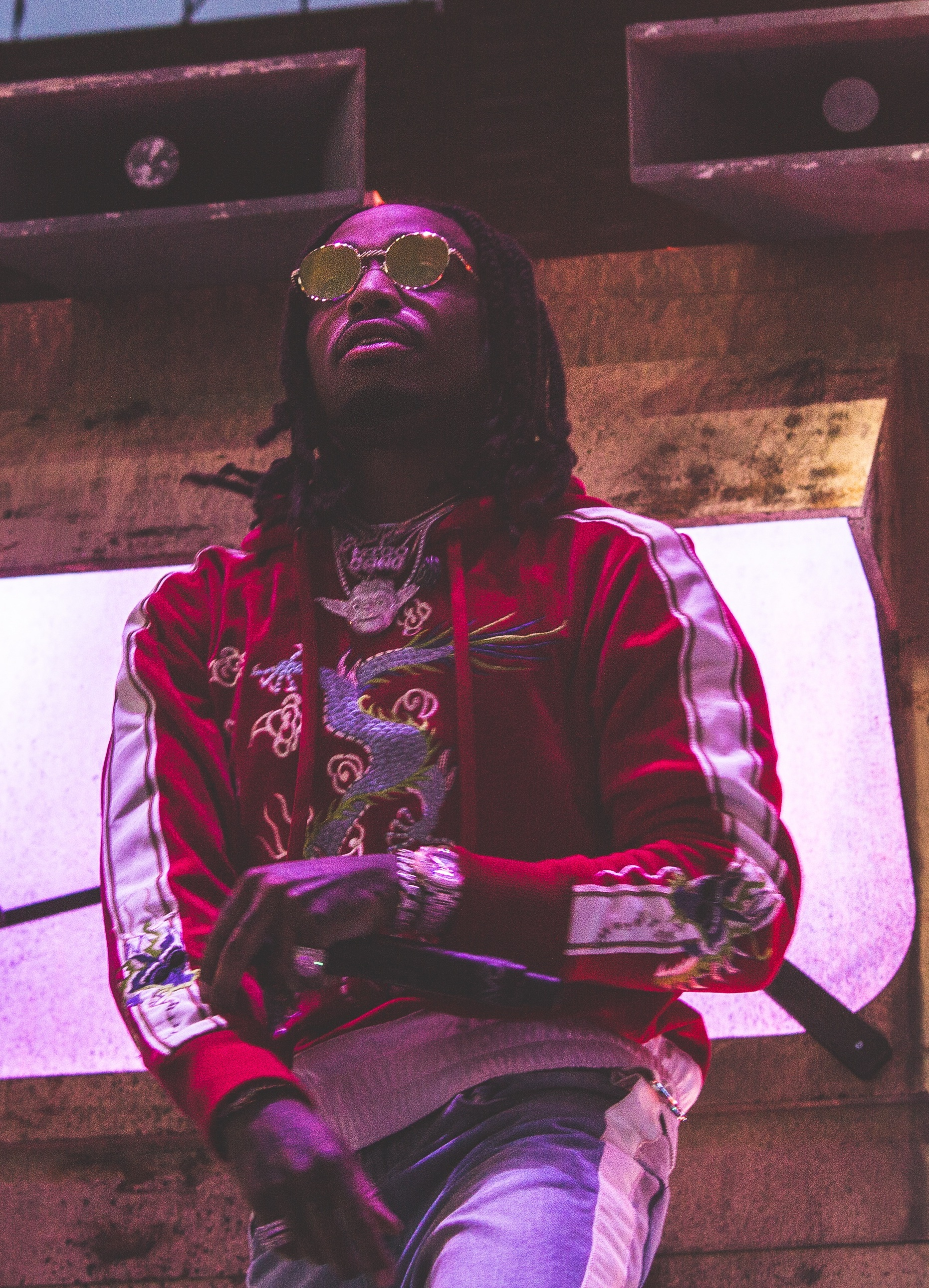
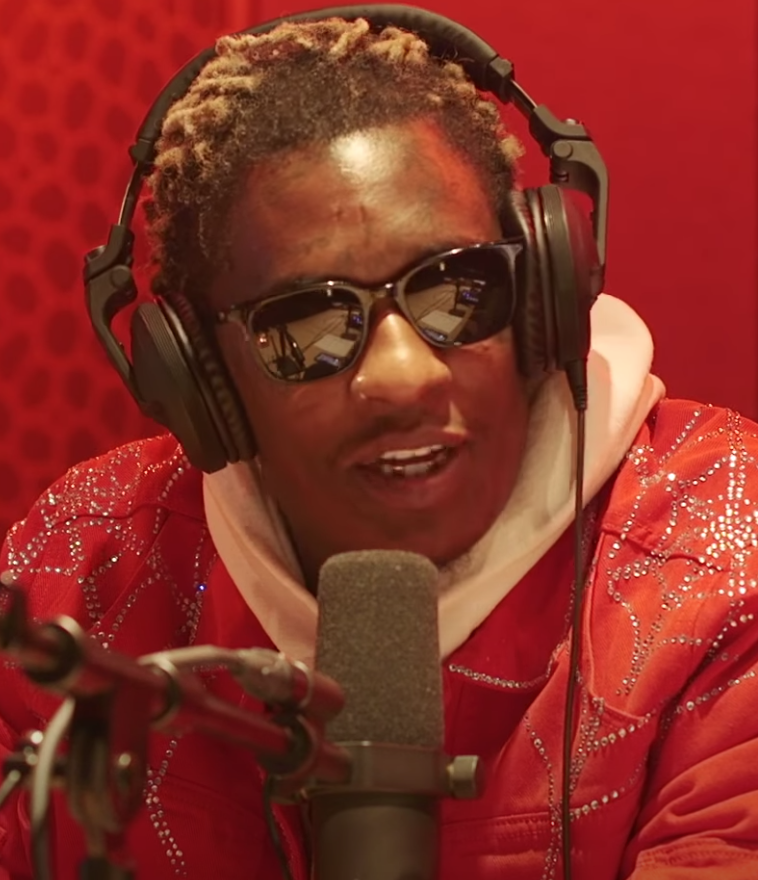
Lamar accuses Drake of exploiting rappers through his relationships with Future, Lil Baby, 21 Savage, Young Thug, Quavo and 2 Chainz (clockwise from top left), all of whom hail from or near Atlanta.

"Not Like Us" is a "club-friendly" West Coast hip-hop track with strong hyphy stylings. Several elements of its production, including the "stirring" violins, piano and brass instruments, were taken from samples of Monk Higgins's 1968 rendition of "I Believe to My Soul", a cover of Ray Charles's 1961 composition. Despite speculation, the song does not include a sample of Nas's diss record "Ether" (2001). On "Not Like Us", Lamar employs a "comically exaggerated" cadence that elicited comparisons to Drakeo the Ruler's signature flow.

"Not Like Us"
The most infamous segment from "Not Like Us", where Lamar teases Drake over allegations of pedophilia and sexual misconduct.

Mustard, the song's primary producer, wanted to work with Lamar for years and would send him about five beats a day for three months. He was inspired to compose the beat after imagining what Dr. Dre would create if he was in a recording studio with Lil Jon. With contributions from Sounwave and Sean Momberger, Mustard produced "Not Like Us" in about 30 minutes by speeding up the sample's tempo to create a "relentless" and "urgent" atmosphere. Its additional bassline, snare drums, and finger snaps heightened its "aggressive" tone. On April 6, 2024, Mustard sent the finished production to Lamar while attending his manager's birthday dinner. He received a complimentary text message from Lamar later that evening, but was unaware Lamar used it until the song came out.

=== Lyrics ===
"Not Like Us" begins with Lamar whispering "psst, I see dead people", a reference to The Sixth Sense (1999), which he previously referenced on "Euphoria". Lamar then makes a series of allusions to his hometown of Compton, California, before accusing Drake of sexual behavior with minors. Lamar references Drake's album Certified Lover Boy (2021) when labeling him and his label OVO Sound as "certified pedophiles", specifically naming Chubbs, Drake's head of security; PartyNextDoor, the first artist signed; and Baka Not Nice, who had been in prison for human trafficking before signing.

Lamar also attacks Drake's personal relationships, alleging that Drake had sex with Lil Wayne's girlfriend, saying he "did [J.] Cole foul", and warning him to "not speak on Serena", referencing the fact that Drake and Serena Williams – who also grew up near Compton – were romantically involved in 2015 and that Drake dissed her husband in "Middle of the Ocean" (2022).

Lamar challenges Drake's cultural identity throughout the track. In the second verse, Lamar accuses Drake of disrespecting the memory of rapper 2Pac by artificially recreating his voice on "Taylor Made Freestyle". In the third verse, Lamar accuses Drake of exploiting Black artists from Atlanta for street credibility and financial gain in the same way that colonizers in the city exploited slave labor, using his collaborations with Future, Lil Baby, 21 Savage, Young Thug, Quavo, and 2 Chainz as examples. The chorus, which consists solely of the phrase "they not like us", has been interpreted as a message that Drake and his associates "are unlike [Lamar's] own caliber, one that organically abides by the given morals of Black culture".

Lamar himself explained the personal meaning of the track in an interview with SZA:

"Not Like Us" is the energy of who I am, the type of man I represent. Now, if you identify with the man that I represent … This man has morals, he has values, he believes in something, he stands on something. He’s not pandering.

He’s a man who can recognize his mistakes and not be afraid to share the mistakes and can dig deep down into fear-based ideologies or experiences to be able to express them without feeling like he’s less of a man.

If I’m thinking of "Not Like Us", I’m thinking of me and whoever identifies with that.

== Critical reception and analysis ==
"Not Like Us" was met with widespread critical acclaim for the contagious production, Lamar's vocal performance, and scathing songwriting. GQ's Frazier Tharpe dubbed the track a leading contender for the "song of the summer". He praised how the "banger" summoned Mustard's "raucous, party-starting homegrown energy" to deliver Lamar's "haymaker" that both out-strategized Drake and celebrated their West Coast upbringings. Stereogum editors found the song to be not only an "ultra-effective" diss record but a hit filled with "vicious" allegations and history lessons. Professional wrestler Shawn Michaels appreciated that his Sweet Chin Music finisher was mentioned in the song and invited Lamar and Drake to settle their differences at a WWE NXT program. Two other individuals referenced in the song, Serena Williams and M. Night Shyamalan, the writer and director of The Sixth Sense, praised it. Harvey Mason Jr., chief executive officer of the Recording Academy, praised the song's artistry and relevance.

Journalists described "Not Like Us" as a cultural touchstone, a clarion call for the West Coast, and one of the biggest diss tracks they have witnessed in their lifetimes. They considered the timing of its release and content an effective strategy in capturing the zeitgeist before listeners grew tired of the feud. Jordan Rose of Complex declared "Not Like Us" as the best track released during Lamar and Drake's feud due to its electric tone and "contagious" production, although many of the lyrics are "very questionable". Rose believes that "time will tell" if the song marked the "end conclusion" of their war, but it has already proven itself to be "the stone that stunned Goliath." Vibe's Armon Sadler ranked "Not Like Us" as the second-best track of the feud, praising the "undeniable bop" as a "masterclass" in execution. Mark Elibert from Billboard, who named it the fourth-best song, shared similar sentiments. Canadian outlets such as CBC News and Exclaim! opined that "Not Like Us" has grown into an anti-Canadian anthem reminiscent of "Blame Canada" from South Park: Bigger, Longer & Uncut (1999). Uproxx's Wongo Okon noted it helped Lamar become a more appealing figure for Generation Z and Generation Alpha listeners. Rolling Stone's Jeff Ihaza wrote in a two-year retrospective article that "the song's afterlife has been unusually protracted" and that it "changed the atmosphere around rap itself", noting that "The impression remains that [Drake] was beaten so badly that he had to go to court to clear his name."

The song has also been examined in the context of race and cultural appropriation. Salamishah Tillet of The New York Times opined that while the message of "Not Like Us" may seem to attack Drake's biracial identity, its popularity has inspired a broad assortment of interracial interpretations. Rolling Stone's Andre Gee believes the song is a "rally against perpetrators who shifted hip-hop from a Black and brown community with culturally understood modes of being into an at-times parodic circus." Mark P. Braboy of The Triibe expanded on Gee's sentiments, applying the song's message to "culture vultures" in hip-hop journalism who have built their platforms by exploiting Black trauma.

Pitchfork named "Not Like Us" as the third-best song released in the 2020s so far. In his accompanying excerpt, Alphonse Pierre declared the line "Certified Lover Boy? Certified pedophiles" as the "defining" lyric of the decade, in ways that are "unsettling and amazing and troubling and funny." Other publications such as Complex, HipHopDX, The Ringer, and The Root ranked "Not Like Us" as one of the greatest diss tracks of all time.

Critics' year-end rankings of "Not Like Us”
Publication	List	Rank	Ref.
Pitchfork	The 100 Best Songs of 2024	1	
Consequence	200 Best Songs of 2024	1	
Billboard	The 100 Best Songs of 2024	1	
The Ringer	11 Best Songs of 2024	1	
Stereogum	The 50 Best Songs of 2024	2	
Exclaim!	20 Best Songs of 2024	2	
NME	The 50 Best Songs of 2024	2	
The Independent	The 20 Best Songs of 2024	3	
Rolling Stone	The 100 Best Songs of 2024	2	
NPR	124 Best Songs of 2024	—N/a	
The New York Times	Best Songs of 2024 (Jon Pareles)	1	
The New York Times	Best Songs of 2024 (Jon Caramanica)	2 (tie)	
Business Insider	The Best Songs Of 2024	4	
Crack	The Best 25 Songs of 2024	5	
Los Angeles Times	The 30 Best Songs of 2024	2	
Flood Magazine	The Best Songs of 2024	2	
Slant	The 50 Best Songs of 2024	7	
The Guardian	The 20 Best Songs of 2024	10	

== Commercial performance ==
=== Global ===
"Not Like Us" was an immediate commercial success and broke numerous streaming records—most of which were previously held by Drake. It led the Billboard Global 200 chart for four non-consecutive weeks, marking Lamar's first solo number-one song on the survey. It is also reportedly the most-streamed diss track on Spotify, earning the biggest single-day streams for a hip hop song (12.8 million) and the most song streams in a week by a rapper (81.2 million). Additionally, it became the fastest rap song on the platform to accumulate 100 million (9 days), 200 million (19 days), 300 million (35 days), 400 million (54 days), 500 million (70 days), 600 million (87 days), and 700 million streams (112 days). It accumulated one billion streams in mid-January 2025.

=== United States ===
In the United States, "Not Like Us" debuted at number one on the Billboard Hot 100 chart dated May 18, 2024, opening with 70.9 million streams, five million radio airplay audience impressions, and 15,000 copies sold. It registered the highest first-week streaming figure for a hip hop song since Billboard removed YouTube song user-generated content from its chart metrics in 2020. As Lamar's fourth number-one single and first solo number-one debut, "Not Like Us" became the first rap song in history to top the Hot 100 with a shortened tracking week of five days. It also marked Mustard's first number-one single and debut as a producer, and one of the only chart leaders to be penned by a sole writer.

Following its music video premiere, "Not Like Us" bested "A Bar Song (Tipsy)" by Shaboozey and returned to number one on the Hot 100 chart, dated July 20, 2024, with 53.8 million streams, 40 million radio airplay audience impressions, and 8,000 copies sold. It is the longest-running solo chart-topper of Lamar's career, surpassing "Humble". In October 2024, "Not Like Us" broke the record set by "Old Town Road" by Lil Nas X featuring Billy Ray Cyrus for the most weeks spent atop the Hot Rap Songs chart. It's also the second longest-charting number-one song on the Hot R&B/Hip-Hop Songs chart. By the end of the year, "Not Like Us", accumulated 823.5 million on-demand audio streams in the US, making it the second most streamed song of the year and was the sixth best-performing song on the Billboard Hot 100 in 2024. Just after Lamar's performance at the Super Bowl LIX halftime show, the song once again returned to number one on the Hot 100 chart, dated February 22, 2025 (with 49 million streams, 20.5 million radio airplay audience impressions, and 33,000 copies sold), becoming the third-longest break between time at number one in the chart's history, and the first non-holiday song to top the Hot 100 three separate times with breaks of two or more months between times at number one. The song also charted at number thirteen on Pop Airplay and topped the Rhythmic Airplay charts. On July 8, 2025, Complex reported that the song has sold over 10 million copies in the United States.

=== United Kingdom and Oceania ===
In the United Kingdom, "Not Like Us" debuted at number ten on the UK Singles Chart, and initially peaked at number six, becoming Lamar's eighth top ten hit song in Britain, as well as topping the Hip Hop/R&B chart. Following Lamar's performance at the Super Bowl LIX halftime show, the song peaked at #1 on February 21, 2025, becoming his first chart-topping song on the UK Singles Chart. It remained atop the chart for two weeks.

In New Zealand, "Not Like Us" debuted at number six on the Official Aotearoa Music Charts dated May 13, 2024. Two weeks later, it reached number two for one week before dropping out of the top three. Following its music video release, "Not Like Us" became Lamar's second number-one single as a solo artist, and his third overall in the country. It remained atop for another week.

In Australia, "Not Like Us" debuted at number nine on the ARIA Charts dated May 19, 2024. It reached number five the following week, at its initial peak. The song reached number five for its second week after the release of the music video, dated July 21, 2024. On the week of February 17, 2025, following his Grammy wins and performance at the Super Bowl LIX halftime show, "Not Like Us" reached number one, becoming Lamar's first number-one hit as a solo artist. It also topped the Hip Hop/R&B chart.

Following his performances at the Super Bowl LIX halftime show, the song debuted at number 52 on the Brasil Hot 100, and at number 86 on the Japan Hot 100, becoming his first entries on both charts.

== Accolades ==
On November 8, 2024, "Not Like Us" was nominated for the 67th Annual Grammy Awards in five different categories: Record of the Year, Song of the Year, Best Rap Performance, Best Rap Song, and Best Music Video. On February 3, 2025, the song swept all five categories. Though he did not mention Drake in his speeches, rather dedicating them to Los Angeles, Lamar was noted for his choice of outfit at the ceremony – a denim top along with denim pants, known as a "Canadian tuxedo" – seen as a playful jab at the Canadian-born Drake.

Awards and nominations for "Not Like Us"
Organization	Year	Category	Result	Ref.
Billboard Music Awards	2024	Top Streaming Song	Nominated	
Billboard Music Awards	2024	Top Rap Song	Won	
BET Hip Hop Awards	2024	Song of the Year	Won	
BET Hip Hop Awards	2024	Best Hip Hop Video	Won	
BET Hip Hop Awards	2024	Impact Track	Won	
BET Awards	2025	Viewer's Choice	Nominated	
BET Awards	2025	Video of the Year	Won	
MTV Europe Music Awards	2024	Best Video	Nominated	
MTV Video Music Awards	2024	Song of the Year	Nominated	
MTV Video Music Awards	2024	Song of Summer	Nominated	
MTV Video Music Awards	2025	Video of the Year	Nominated	
MTV Video Music Awards	2025	Best Hip Hop	Nominated	
MTV Video Music Awards	2025	Best Direction	Nominated	
MTV Video Music Awards	2025	Best Art Direction	Nominated	
MTV Video Music Awards	2025	Best Cinematography	Won	
MTV Video Music Awards	2025	Best Editing	Nominated	
MTV Video Music Awards	2025	Best Choreography	Nominated	
Grammy Awards	2025	Record of the Year	Won	
Grammy Awards	2025	Song of the Year	Won	
Grammy Awards	2025	Best Rap Performance	Won	
Grammy Awards	2025	Best Rap Song	Won	
Grammy Awards	2025	Best Music Video	Won	
Music Awards Japan	2025	Best International Hip Hop/Rap Song in Japan	Won	
Music Awards Japan	2025	Listener′s Choice: International Song	Nominated	

== Music video ==
=== Production ===
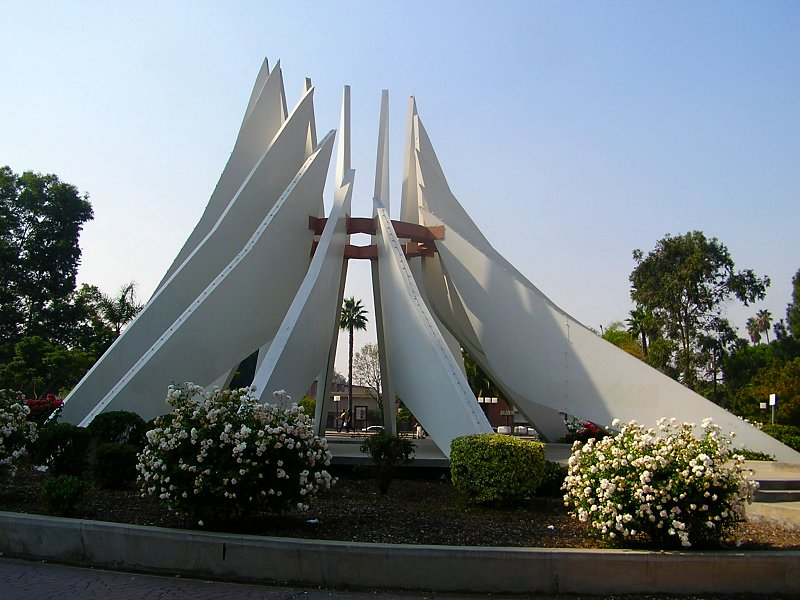
The Martin Luther King, Jr. Memorial, one of several Compton landmarks featured in the music video for "Not Like Us"

Dave Free and Lamar directed and executive produced the music video for "Not Like Us". Charm La'Donna handled the choreography and is also credited as the associate producer. In commemoration of American Independence Day, the music video was released on July 4, 2024, at approximately 3 p.m. PT. Four still images from the video were leaked to social media a day prior. CNN and NME noted widespread anticipation for the video up to its release; Billboard called it "the most anticipated video of the year so far". By the morning after, the video had reached over 13 million views on YouTube, and by that afternoon, the number reached over 17 million.

The music video contains complex symbolism, innuendos, euphemisms, double entendres, and easter eggs; each ripened for fan interpretation. Parts of the visuals were filmed on June 22, 2024, across multiple locations in Lamar's hometown of Compton, California and Los Angeles. PGLang, Lamar and Free's production company, enlisted the Los Angeles County Sheriff's Department for increased security. Deputies monitoring the production, which over 1,000 fans witnessed, were reportedly paid $120 an hour. A number of celebrities made cameo appearances in the music video, including Jay Rock, Schoolboy Q, Ab-Soul, Anthony "Top Dawg" Tiffith, Terrence "Punch" Henderson, Anthony "Moosa" Tiffith Jr., Mustard, Dave Free, Tommy the Clown and the Hip Hop Clowns, Charm La'Donna, DeMar DeRozan, YG, Roddy Ricch, Steve Lacy, JasonMartin, Thundercat, Brandon T. Jackson, Hit-Boy and his father Big Hit, Storm DeBarge, Kida the Great, and Taiwan Williams, among others.

=== Synopsis ===
The video starts with a view of the Compton Courthouse overlooking the Martin Luther King, Jr. Memorial. Lamar sashays down a white, morgue-like hall to a snippet of the then-unreleased song "Squabble Up" from his sixth studio album, GNX (2024). Upon knocking on a door using the "Shave and a Haircut" tune, Tommy the Clown slides open an eye hole and asks for the password. Lamar whispers the code, "I see dead people", and is allowed entry, although he is scolded for being late. He takes his seat with his classmates, the Hip Hop Clowns, and grooves to "Not Like Us". Lamar gives the finger and dances in the corner. A classmate passes him a Bible, which he carefully slips in his jacket.

Using cinematography that mirrors the lyric video for "Family Matters", a covered figure resembling Drake on the cover of Dark Lane Demo Tapes (2020) tries to ambush Lamar from behind; he is quickly blown away. Lamar completes seventeen (not 18) push-ups on four cinder blocks—a response to Drake ordering him to "drop and give me fifty" on "Push Ups"—in a bedroom with strong similarities to a prison cell. He then strikes an owl-shaped piñata and glides down a hopscotch court numbered 1 through 10. A disclaimer insulting Drake's record label, OVO Sound, is shown as he repeatedly hits the piñata. Aerial shots of a large crowd of Compton residents gathered inside of the memorial and chanting the song are featured throughout the video.

Lamar and Mustard take a drive through Compton's Rosecrans Avenue in a black Ferrari SF90 Stradale. They stop at Tam's Burgers #21 to grab some food with dancer Storm DeBarge. Lamar then joins a group of friends on a rooftop near the Courthouse before meeting Free and DeMar DeRozan at a dockyard containing white shipping containers. Dancers Kida the Great and Taiwan Williams accompany Lamar on the dockyard, while La'Donna is seen tightrope walking in the clouds. At Nickerson Gardens, Lamar hangs out with his former Top Dawg labelmates Jay Rock, Schoolboy Q and Ab-Soul (collectively known as Black Hippy), along with executives Anthony "Top Dawg" Tiffith, Terrence "Punch" Henderson, and Anthony "Moosa" Tiffith Jr.

Shifting back to the classroom, Lamar and the Hip Hop Clowns perform a number under Tommy the Clown's watch. Lamar poses with his partner Whitney Alford and their children in a living room; the couple dances joyfully while the children play. A barn owl and Lamar engage in a stare down—as he leaves, the owl realizes it has been locked in a cage. In what appears to be unedited footage from the shoot, Free asks the rapturous Compton crowd through a bullhorn if they want to play the song again as the end titles appear on the screen.

=== Reception and analysis ===
The music video was met with widespread critical acclaim. Numerous publications and websites called it another victory lap for Lamar in his feud with Drake. (Note: According to Pitchfork, Variety, Vulture, GQ, People, and The Hollywood Reporter.) CBC News called it a moment of re-ignition of the feud, while Vibe opined it as Lamar's "knockout punch" against Drake. Journalists described the video as refuting Drake's allegations against Lamar: it depicts Lamar's family dancing happily alongside him, and the video credits emphasize Lamar and Free's collaboration.

Vinson Cunningham of The New Yorker thought that the video's Independence Day release was a "jingoistic move" that draws a "bright line" along the Canada–United States border. He made an "Edenic" comparison to the image of Lamar and his family posing with Grant Wood's American Gothic (1930) and Gordon Parks's 1942 photograph of the same name, arguing that the frame inaugurated a "new sort" of American iconography. Entertainment Weekly observed the inclusion of new music in the intro to the video, noting fan speculation that it was to be included in Lamar's potential next studio album. USA Today's Naledi Ushe mused that with the release of the music video, Lamar had aimed to take Drake's "song of the summer trophy", noting Drake's perceived achievement with several of his late 2010s singles and the relative failure of the singles from For All the Dogs (2023), leaving the title open for Lamar and Sabrina Carpenter with "Espresso" to contend. NBC News noted the song's appraisal as a celebration of Compton and the West Coast. GQ appreciated Lamar's choice of fashion style in the video, pointing out that his wearing of a Prada suit and multiple Martine Rose track jackets reinforced a claim that he made a year ago that he "is the best-dressed MC in rap".

== Drake's response ==
Drake responded with "The Heart Part 6" one day after "Not Like Us" was released, in which he denied all accusations and stated that he would have liked to dance to "Not Like Us" if Lamar was not "tripling down on some whole other bullshit". On November 24, 2024, Drake appeared on a Kick livestream with Canadian streamer xQc, describing himself as "fully intact, mind, body, and soul". Lamar reacted to these comments with amusement.

=== Legal actions ===
On November 25, 2024, Drake filed a petition against Universal Music Group (UMG) and Spotify under New York law claiming that they had conspired to artificially inflate the popularity of "Not Like Us" to "deceive consumers into believing the song was more popular than it was in reality". His attorneys accused UMG of violating the Racketeer Influenced and Corrupt Organizations Act (RICO) and using deceptive business practices and false advertising. UMG stated in response that the allegations were "offensive and untrue", that they would "never do anything to undermine" any artist signed to the label, and that "fans choose the music they want to hear". Drake later filed a second petition against UMG under Texas law claiming defamation by failing to halt the release of a song "falsely accusing him of being a sex offender." He also accused UMG of "funneling payments" to iHeartRadio as part of a "pay-to-play scheme" to promote "Not Like Us" on the radio.

On January 15, 2025, Drake filed a defamation lawsuit in New York federal court against UMG, with substantially the same factual allegations. He did not include Lamar as a defendant. In March, UMG moved to dismiss the lawsuit, arguing that Drake "lost a rap battle that he provoked and in which he willingly participated," and that he should have "accept[ed] the loss like the unbothered rap artist he often claims to be." The case was assigned to Judge Jeannette Vargas, who allowed Drake's legal team to subpoena Kojo Menne Asamoah, a potential witness. On October 9, 2025, Vargas dismissed the suit. She held that New York law did not permit defamation lawsuits for statements of opinion. She concluded that a reasonable listener would understand that rap battles are opinionated and that diss tracks are not "fact-checked verifiable content." Drake appealed on October 29. A court hearing for the appeal is set for December 4, 2026.

== Notable live performances ==
=== The Pop Out: Ken & Friends ===
During the Pop Out: Ken & Friends, held on Juneteenth 2024 at the Kia Forum in Inglewood, California, Lamar performed "Not Like Us" for the first time. The song was introduced by Dr. Dre whispering the opening lines. The track was followed by four consecutive reprises, the last two featured a wide assortment of emerging and notable West Coast figures. NPR Music's Sheldon Pearce compared the picture to Art Kane's A Great Day in Harlem (1958). Several critics viewed the "raw" performances of "Not Like Us" as a highlight of the concert and praised its liveliness. David Dennis Jr. of Andscape commended the way Lamar turned a song centered on his disdain for Drake into a moment of "unity and love".

=== Super Bowl LIX halftime show ===
On September 8, 2024, Lamar was announced as the headlining act for the Super Bowl LIX halftime show at the Caesars Superdome in New Orleans, Louisiana. Speculation arose as to whether he would incorporate "Not Like Us" into his performance. Justin Sayles of The Ringer called the halftime performance announcement as the capstone of a year that had seen Lamar "ascend to the highest levels" of popular culture, and seen Drake "sink to the lowest levels" of his career.

"Not Like Us" would indeed be performed towards the end of Lamar's Super Bowl halftime setlist on February 9, 2025. In an interlude during the middle of the set, Lamar teased the song and alluded to Drake's litigation by quipping "I want to perform their favorite song, but you know they love to sue", which was followed by a brief audio clip of the song's introduction. In another interlude after performing "All the Stars", he said "they tried to rig the game but you can't fake influence", then launched into "Not Like Us". Lamar looked directly into the camera with a smile when he rapped "Say Drake, I hear you like 'em young". The lyric including the word "pedophile" was censored, but the audience could be heard shouting the lyric "tryna strike a chord and it's probably A minor" along with him a few lines later.

Professional tennis player Serena Williams, who shares Lamar's hometown of Compton, made a cameo appearance as a dancer doing a crip walk during "Not Like Us", a reference to Williams performing a similar dance after her victory at the 2012 Summer Olympics, for which she faced some criticism. Williams's appearance was also received as a diss towards Drake, with whom she was rumored to have dated several years earlier.

Lisa Respers France of CNN would call "Not Like Us" the star of the halftime performance, while Maria Sherman of the Associated Press described Lamar performing the song on the biggest stage in US sports, especially days after the song swept the Grammy Awards, as "another step in Lamar's continued victory lap".

== Cultural impact ==
=== Economy and fashion ===
Following the release of the music video for "Not Like Us", Tam's Burgers #21 saw a significant spike in business. Lauro Hernandez and his son Bryan Noe, the managers of the restaurant, reported that they experienced a 30% to 40% boost in sales. Spiro Vovos, who owns the Tam's Burgers chain, later clarified that it was more of a surge in foot traffic and content creators visiting the location; the sales influx mostly occurred as the video was being filmed. A mural honoring Lamar and "Not Like Us" was painted on the restaurant's exterior by Mike Norice. Fashion brands such as Willy Chavarria also enjoyed substantial increases in brand recognition and sales after their pieces were featured in the music video.

Small business owners in Compton, however, were negatively impacted by the production of the music video. In a report conducted by the Los Angeles Times, a strip mall across from the Compton Courthouse that houses local businesses had its parking lot overrun by "cars and chaos" as hundreds of people poured out to the Courthouse to catch a glimpse of Lamar. The mall's owners had to shut down operations and claimed they lost thousands of dollars during the shoot. They placed the blame on city officials for their lack of communication, and have asked Lamar, PGLang, or the city government to provide financial compensation.

=== Entertainment ===
Several musicians, such as Isaiah Rashad, Janet Jackson, Megan Thee Stallion, and T-Pain, have incorporated "Not Like Us" in their live performances; while others including DaBaby, Remble, Montana of 300, and Kevin Hart shared freestyles. At the 2024 BET Awards, host Taraji P. Henson parodied "Not Like Us" as part of her opening monologue. Serena Williams crip walked to the track while hosting the 2024 ESPY Awards. Richie Branson composed a chiptune version of the track and designed a free-to-play video game, titled Not Like Us: The Game. It attracted 1.2 million players during the first 36 hours of its release. Some iPhone users noticed that if they asked Siri to play Drake's Certified Lover Boy (2021) on Spotify, it would occasionally play "Not Like Us" instead. The song was added into Beat Saber as DLC. Conan O'Brien made reference to the song while telling a joke about Drake at the Academy Awards.

=== Politics ===
"Not Like Us" was referenced a number of times during the 2024 US election cycle. Democratic Party figures including vice president Kamala Harris, representative Jasmine Crockett, mayor of Baltimore Brandon Scott, attorney general of Illinois Kwame Raoul, and a protest against Donald Trump in Chicago used the song's chorus as a political metaphor to criticize Trump and members of the Republican Party. Sports journalist Bomani Jones argued that the song influenced a shift in campaign messaging on "every side", suggesting a parallel with politicians like Tim Walz, the governor of Minnesota, publicly branding Trump, his running mate JD Vance, and other Republicans as "weird".

After incumbent president Joe Biden withdrew from the 2024 presidential election, Harris incorporated "Not Like Us" into her own presidential campaign with Walz as her running mate. Journalists were intrigued by the decision, as Harris's mixed-race ancestry was a subject of questioning by her opponents, while younger supporters such as Parker Short were energized by it. During the 2024 Democratic National Convention, "Not Like Us" was chosen as one of the four walk-on songs to represent California at the ceremonial roll call. It was referenced by Alabama congressional candidate Shomari Figures in the context of voting rights during his address at the convention. The Democratic Party referenced the song's cover artwork to criticize Donald Trump's relationship with child sex trafficker Jeffrey Epstein and his refusal to declassify files related to the case. In global politics, rapper Sabi Wu sampled "Not Like Us" to compose a protest song opposing the Kenya Finance Bill.

=== Sports ===
Keith Murphy for Andscape predicted that "Not Like Us" could become the "next great sports anthem". Major professional sports leagues such as the National Basketball Association (NBA), the National Collegiate Athletic Association (NCAA), the National Football League (NFL), Major League Baseball (MLB), Major League Soccer (MLS), and the Women's National Basketball Association (WNBA) have used "Not Like Us" in their broadcasts and social media campaigns, especially teams from the Los Angeles area. USA Basketball also used the track throughout the 2024 Summer Olympics. Marching bands representing historically black universities, such as the Human Jukebox (Southern), Marching 100 (Florida A&M), and Sounds of Dyn-O-Mite (Alcorn State), performed "Not Like Us" during their respective sports seasons.

The social media accounts of the Argentina national football team used the song's title to mock Drake after he lost a $300,000 bet in favor of Canada during the semifinals of the 2024 Copa América. The Los Angeles Dodgers used the song to mock the Toronto Blue Jays after defeating them in the 2025 World Series. The United States men's national ice hockey team used the song to celebrate after beating the Canadian team at the 2026 Winter Olympics. The Cleveland Cavaliers used the song to mock the Toronto Raptors when eliminating them from the 2026 NBA playoffs; Drake is associated with the Raptors.

=== Crime ===
Drake's OVO clothing retailer on London's Carnaby Street was vandalized on May 7, 2024, by an unknown graffiti artist, who plastered the phrase "They not like us" in silver lettering on its window. The Metropolitan Police did not announce plans to investigate the store tagging and no arrests were made. In the following days, two separate individuals were apprehended by the Toronto Police while attempting to break into Drake's Bridle Path home; the same residence shown on the cover art for "Not Like Us". On June 30, 2024, Rick Ross and his entourage were attacked at the Ignite Music Festival in Vancouver, Canada, by a group of attendees after he played "Not Like Us" to close out his headlining set. Ross later reported to TMZ that no one from his team suffered any serious injuries from the assault.

== Personnel ==
Credits are adapted from Tidal and Qobuz.

- Kendrick Lamar – lead vocals, songwriter
- Mustard – songwriter, producer
- Sounwave – songwriter, co-producer
- Sean Momberger – songwriter, co-producer
- Ray Charles – songwriter
- Jonathan Turner – mixing engineer
- Ray Charles Brown Jr. – recording engineer
- Nicolas de Porcel – mastering engineer
- Monk Higgins – sampled artist

== Charts ==
=== Weekly charts ===
Weekly chart performance
Chart (2024–2026)	Peak position
Argentina Hot 100 (Billboard)	58
Australia (ARIA)	1
Australia Hip Hop/R&B (ARIA)	1
Austria (Ö3 Austria Top 40)	5
Belgium (Ultratop 50 Flanders)	20
Belgium (Ultratop 50 Wallonia)	17
Bolivia (Billboard)	17
Brazil Hot 100 (Billboard)	52
Canada Hot 100 (Billboard)	1
Central America Anglo Airplay (Monitor Latino)	14
Chile (Billboard)	23
Colombia (Billboard)	23
Costa Rica Streaming (FONOTICA)	10
Croatia (Billboard)	14
Czech Republic Singles Digital (ČNS IFPI)	9
Denmark (Tracklisten)	6
Dominican Republic Anglo Airplay (Monitor Latino)	3
Ecuador (Billboard)	21
El Salvador Anglo Airplay (Monitor Latino)	9
Estonia Airplay (TopHit)	40
Finland (Suomen virallinen lista)	15
France (SNEP)	4
Germany (GfK)	4
Global 200 (Billboard)	1
Greece International (IFPI)	1
Honduras Anglo Airplay (Monitor Latino)	1
Hong Kong (Billboard)	21
Hungary (Single Top 40)	9
Iceland (Tónlistinn)	5
India International (IMI)	3
Ireland (IRMA)	1
Israel (Mako Hitlist)	19
Italy (FIMI)	52
Italian Urban Airplay (EarOne)	14
Japan Hot 100 (Billboard)	86
Latvia Streaming (LaIPA)	1
Lebanon English (Lebanese Top 20)	14
Lithuania (AGATA)	2
Luxembourg (Billboard)	2
Malaysia (Billboard)	9
Malaysia International (RIM)	7
Middle East and North Africa (IFPI)	1
Mexico (Billboard)	19
Netherlands (Single Top 100)	8
New Zealand (Recorded Music NZ)	1
Nicaragua Anglo Airplay (Monitor Latino)	4
Nigeria (TurnTable Top 100)	15
North Africa (IFPI)	17
Norway (VG-lista)	5
Peru (Billboard)	18
Philippines (IFPI)	14
Philippines (Philippines Hot 100)	12
Poland (Polish Streaming Top 100)	8
Portugal (AFP)	2
Romania (Billboard)	8
Saudi Arabia (IFPI)	1
Singapore (RIAS)	7
Slovakia Singles Digital (ČNS IFPI)	4
South Africa Streaming (TOSAC)	1
South Korea (Circle)	30
Spain (Promusicae)	20
Sweden (Sverigetopplistan)	3
Switzerland (Schweizer Hitparade)	2
Taiwan (Billboard)	18
United Arab Emirates (IFPI)	2
UK Singles (Official Charts)	1
UK Hip Hop/R&B (Official Charts)	1
US Billboard Hot 100	1
US Hot R&B/Hip-Hop Songs (Billboard)	1
US Pop Airplay (Billboard)	13
US Rhythmic Airplay (Billboard)	1

=== Monthly charts ===
Monthly chart performance
Chart (2025)	Position
Estonia Airplay (TopHit)	70
Lithuania Airplay (TopHit)	82
South Korea (Circle)	36

=== Year-end charts ===
Year-end chart performance
Chart (2024)	Position
Australia (ARIA)	23
Australia Hip Hop/R&B (ARIA)	3
Canada (Canadian Hot 100)	11
Denmark (Tracklisten)	99
Global 200 (Billboard)	11
Global Singles (IFPI)	8
Iceland (Tónlistinn)	43
Netherlands (Single Top 100)	91
New Zealand (Recorded Music NZ)	9
Portugal (AFP)	46
South Africa (TOSAC)	6
Switzerland (Schweizer Hitparade)	53
UK Singles (OCC)	43
US Billboard Hot 100	6
US Hot R&B/Hip-Hop Songs (Billboard)	1
US R&B/Hip-Hop Airplay (Billboard)	6
US Mainstream Top 40 (Billboard)	47
US Rhythmic (Billboard)	3

Year-end chart performance
Chart (2025)	Position
Australia (ARIA)	25
Belgium (Ultratop 50 Flanders)	157
Belgium (Ultratop 50 Wallonia)	138
Canada (Canadian Hot 100)	38
France (SNEP)	149
Global 200 (Billboard)	11
Hungary (Single Top 40)	88
Iceland (Tónlistinn)	91
New Zealand (Recorded Music NZ)	18
South Korea (Circle)	142
Sweden (Sverigetopplistan)	87
Switzerland (Schweizer Hitparade)	74
UK Singles (OCC)	45
US Billboard Hot 100	17
US Hot R&B/Hip-Hop Songs (Billboard)	5
US Rhythmic Airplay (Billboard)	25

== Certifications ==
Certifications
Region	Certification	Certified units/sales
Australia (ARIA)	6× Platinum	420,000^{‡}
Belgium (BRMA)	Platinum	40,000^{‡}
Brazil (Pro-Música Brasil)	2× Diamond	320,000^{‡}
Canada (Music Canada)	Platinum	80,000^{‡}
Denmark (IFPI Danmark)	Platinum	90,000^{‡}
France (SNEP)	Diamond	333,333^{‡}
Germany (BVMI)	Gold	300,000^{‡}
Italy (FIMI)	Gold	50,000^{‡}
New Zealand (RMNZ)	5× Platinum	150,000^{‡}
Nigeria (TCSN)	Gold	50,000^{‡}
Poland (ZPAV)	Platinum	50,000^{‡}
Portugal (AFP)	3× Platinum	30,000^{‡}
Spain (Promusicae)	Gold	30,000^{‡}
United Kingdom (BPI)	2× Platinum	1,200,000^{‡}
Streaming
Central America (CFC)	Platinum	7,000,000^{†}
Greece (IFPI Greece)	3× Platinum	6,000,000^{†}
^{‡} Sales+streaming figures based on certification alone.^{†} Streaming-only figures based on certification alone.

== Release history ==
Release dates and formats
Region	Date	Format(s)	Version	Label	Ref.
Various	May 4, 2024	Digital download; streaming	Original	Interscope	
Italy	May 10, 2024	Radio airplay	Original	EMI	
United States	July 11, 2024	Radio airplay	Original; live	Interscope	
Italy	February 3, 2025	Radio airplay	Original	EMI	
