= Tamtam (disambiguation) =

The tamtam, sometimes spelled tam-tam, is a type of gong.

TamTam, Tam-Tam, tamtam, or tam-tam may also refer to:

- Tam-Tam (album), a 1983 album by Amanda Lear
- Tam Tam (Samurai Shodown), a character from the fighting game Samurai Shodown
- Tamtam (rock club) (TaMtAm), a rock club in Saint Petersburg, Russia
- Tamtam, Iran, a village in Kermanshah Province, Iran
- Tam-Tams, a weekly drum circle held Sundays in the summer in Montreal
- Sekhar Tam Tam (born 1951), Indian medical doctor in Grenada
- Slit drum (Vanuatu) or tamtam, a type of slit drum used in the country of Vanuatu
- Tam Tam crackers, an hexagonal crumbly cracker made by Manischewitz
- Tam Tam o El origen de la rumba, a 1938 Cuban musical film.

== See also ==
- TAM (disambiguation)
