= Singapore Polytechnic =

Post-secondary academic institution in Singapore

Coordinates: 1.3097°N 103.7753°E

- 新加坡理工学院 (Chinese); Politeknik Singapura (Malay)
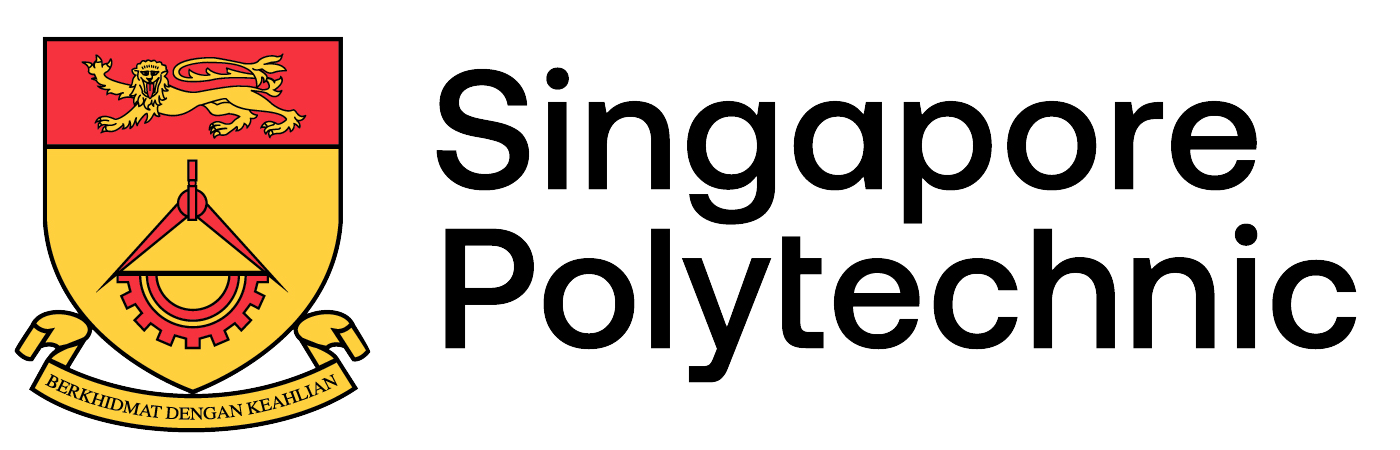
- Motto: Berkhidmat Dengan Keahlian (Malay)
- Motto in English: "To serve with skill" (1960–2014) "To serve with mastery" (2014–present)
- Type: Public; Government
- Established: 27 October 1954; 72 years ago
- Endowment: $97.2 million (2023)
- Chairperson: Voo Zhan Li
- Principal: Soh Wai Wah
- Faculty: 707 (2023)
- Administrative staff: 715 (2023)
- Total staff: 1,422 (2023)
- Students: 16,169 (2023)
- Location: Singapore
- Campus: 38 hectares (94 acres)
- Colors: Red
- Mascot: Jumba
- Website: www.sp.edu.sg
- Singapore Polytechnic

Agency overview
- Jurisdiction: Government of Singapore
- Parent agency: Ministry of Education

Singapore Polytechnic (SP) is a post-secondary education institution and statutory board under the purview of the Ministry of Education in Singapore.

Established in 1954, SP is the first and oldest polytechnic in Singapore, and is renowned for its engineering programmes. Its first site at Prince Edward Road was vacated by 1978; SP is now based at Dover, Singapore, and is currently the largest Polytechnic in Singapore.

== History ==
=== Background ===
The idea of establishing a polytechnic in Singapore was first proposed in August 1951 by the Technical Association of Malaya's Singapore branch (now known as Technological Association Malaysia). An ad-hoc committee, chaired by educationist Thio Chan Bee, petitioned the government in 1952 for the creation of a fully-equipped polytechnic to address the shortage of skilled workers.

In January 1953, then-Governor Sir John F. Nicoll appointed a committee to investigate the feasibility of the polytechnic. This committee was tasked with determining the curriculum, estimating costs and equipment needs, and evaluating the institution's integration into Singapore's existing education system.

=== Committee Reports and Findings ===
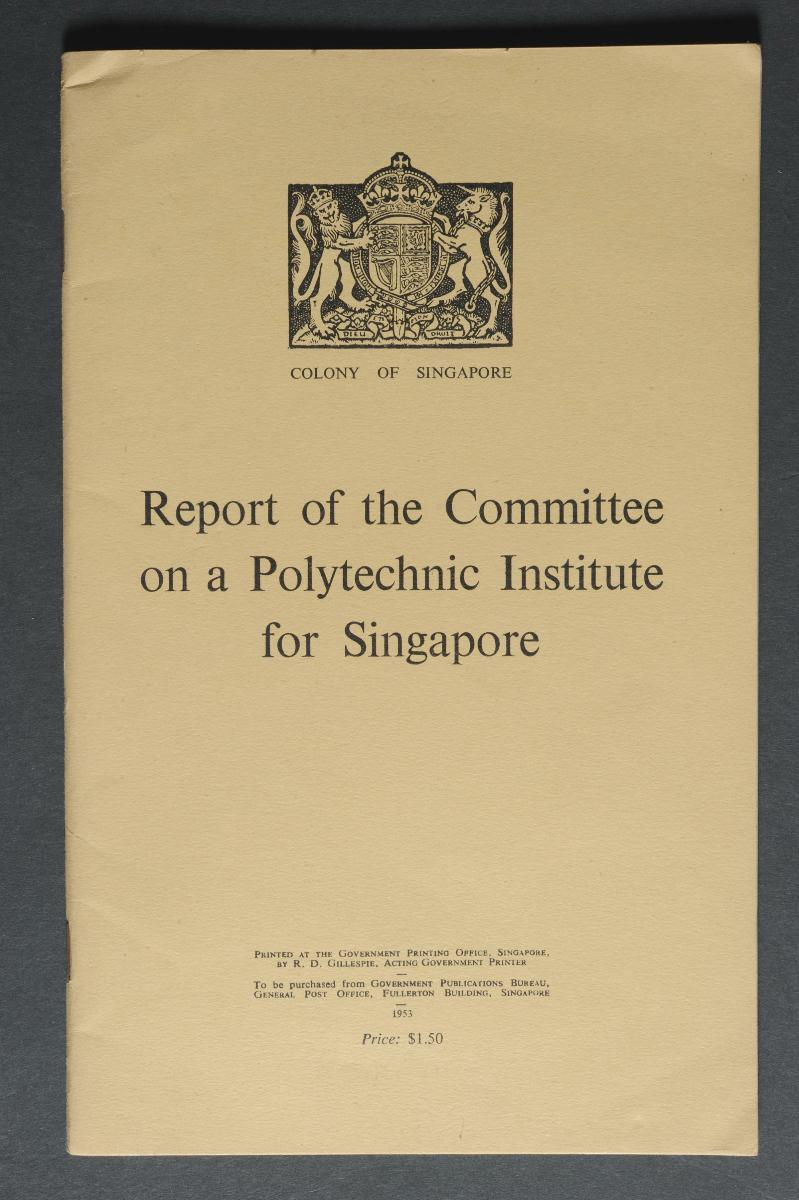
Report of the Committee on a Polytechnic Institute for Singapore, 1953

The 13-member committee, chaired by Professor E. H. G. Dobby from the University of Malaya, submitted the Dobby Report to the government on 17 September 1953. This report defined a polytechnic as an institution offering part-time technical and professional training primarily for employed individuals, with potential for full-time programs.

The report highlighted the need for a polytechnic to equip local workers with modern skills, prepare them for managerial roles, and establish a centralized training system. However, concerns about high costs and Singapore's small population were noted.

Two surveys were conducted to assess training needs. Based on the findings, the committee recommended a polytechnic for at least 2,000 part-time students, with an annual capacity for 500 full-time students. Proposed departments included Commerce, Engineering, Management, Architecture and the Applied Arts, and Vocation Training in Language and Science, with English as the medium of instruction.

=== Establishment ===
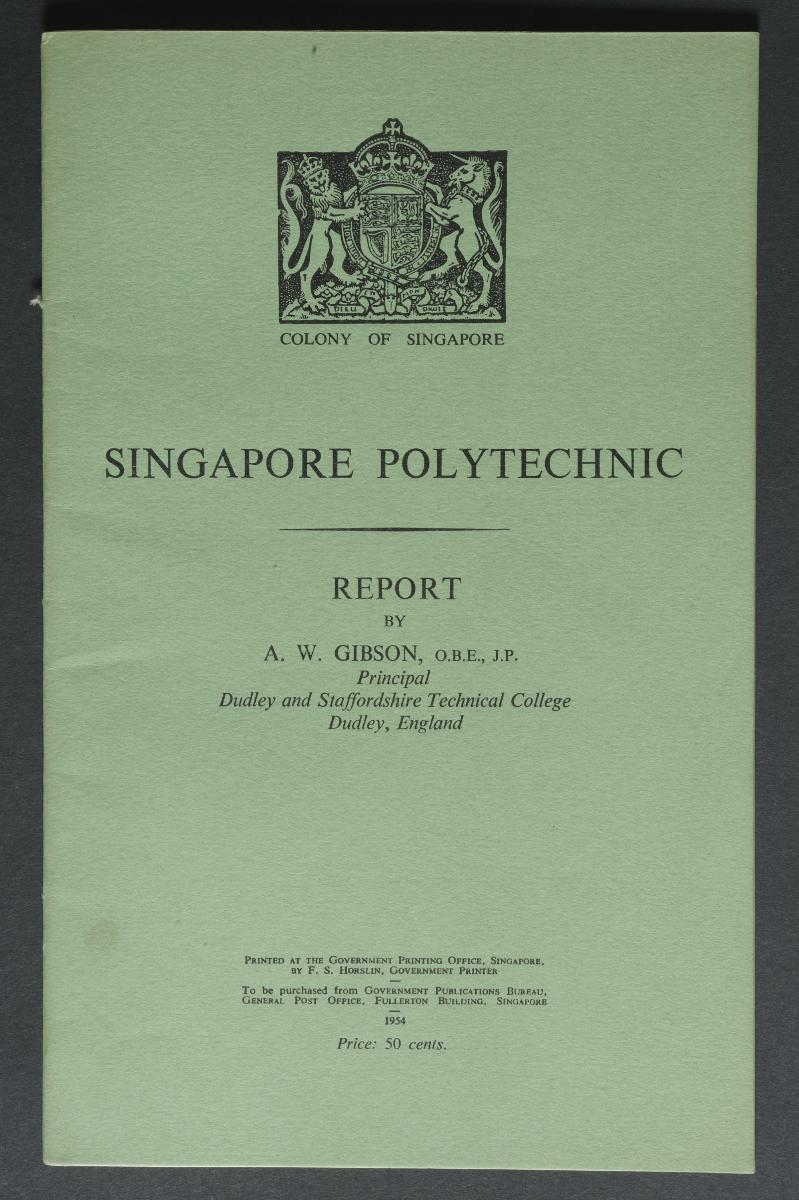
Singapore Polytechnic Report, 1954

Based on the recommendations of the Dobby Report, the Singapore Polytechnic Report was presented on 10 May 1954 to the government of Singapore by A. W. Gibson, then-principal of Dudley and Staffordshire Technical College (now known as Dudley College).

The Singapore Polytechnic Report recommended seven departments for the polytechnic, prioritising General Education, Commerce, Management Studies, Engineering, and Architecture and Building. Secondary priorities included the Applied Arts and a Women's Department for Domestic Science. Gibson emphasised initial training for craftsmen and technicians before expanding to advanced subjects. He also suggested locating the polytechnic at Shenton Circus for optimal accessibility.

On 27 October 1954, the Singapore Polytechnic Act was passed, and the first Board of Governors was appointed in January 1955. Construction of the $5.2 million 10-acre campus at Prince Edward Road, off Shenton Way, commenced in April 1957, while classes continued to be held at the Tanjong Katong Technical School, Belvedere School, and Connell House at Anson Road.

The campus was officially opened by Prince Philip, Duke of Edinburgh, on 24 February 1959, with the then-Governor, Sir William Goode, and the then-Chief Minister, Tun Lim Yew Hock. By then, over 2,800 students were enrolled across 58 courses in 5 departments: Engineering, Building and Architecture, Science and Technology, General Education, and Commerce.

== Academic ==
=== Academic Schools ===
Singapore Polytechnic has 10 Academic Schools and offers 30 Full-Time Diploma Courses and 4 Common Entry Programmes.

- School of Architecture & the Built Environment (ABE)
- School of Business (SB)
- School of Chemical & Life Sciences (CLS)
- School of Computing (SoC)
- School of Electrical & Electronic Engineering (EEE)
- School of Life Skills & Communications (LSC)
- School of Mechanical & Aeronautical Engineering (MAE)
- School of Mathematics & Science (MS)
- Singapore Maritime Academy (SMA)
- Media, Arts & Design School (MAD)

The Singapore Polytechnic's Professional & Adult Continuing Education (PACE) Academy offers over 420 Continuing Education and Training (CET) courses, including Short Courses, Part-Time Diplomas and Post-Diplomas, Work-Study Programmes, SkillsFuture Career Transition Programmes, to boost career opportunities.

== Facilities ==
The Singapore Polytechnic Sports Complex has a football pitch, running track, Olympic-sized swimming complex, four tennis courts, three badminton courts, three basketball courts and a gym.

The SPorts ARena, completed in 2015, has 12 badminton courts, two basketball courts, four squash courts, one multi-purpose court and two volleyball courts. Other facilities include an external rock climbing wall and two rooftop basketball courts.

Moberly is the oldest block of Singapore Polytechnic—it was once a British Army barracks, the building has been refurbished into a recreational hub. It has seven pool tables, jamming studios, karaoke rooms, a café and a mini museum.

=== Other Facilities ===
- The alumni clubhouse, Singapore Polytechnic Graduates Guild (SPGG), is located next to the campus and has a bowling alley, swimming pool, pool room, gym and a restaurant.
- Two libraries: the Main Library and the Hilltop Library. The Main Library houses the first Makerspace in a Singapore library.
- AEROHUB: A four-storey state-of-the-art facility that houses an aircraft hangar, laboratories and a Research & Development centre. There are currently four aircraft in the hangar: Hawker HS 125-700A, King Air B90, A4SU Super Skyhawk and Bell UH-1H.

== Recognition ==
Singapore Polytechnic has been awarded the Singapore Quality Class as well as the ISO 9001 and ISO 14001 certifications. It has also won the Singapore Public Service Award for Organisational Excellence and the People Developer and Family Friendly Awards.

SP received the President's Award for the Environment in 2010. Some of the key green initiatives by SP over the years included spearheading the adoption of Marina Reservoir—keeping it clean and organising the Singapore International Water Festival to engage youths on environmental and water issues.

In 2011, SP won the South West Environment and Community Award (Community Category). The award recognises exemplar efforts of organisations that have contributed to environmental and community sustainability in the district.

SP also clinched the inaugural ASEAN People's Award in 2015 for its contributions toward the region's community-building efforts.

== Scholarships ==
Singapore Polytechnic currently offers the following scholarships:

- SP Scholarship
- SP Engineering Scholarship
- SP Sports and Arts Scholarship
- SP Undergraduate Scholarship

=== Singapore Polytechnic Outstanding Talent (SPOT) Programme ===
SPOT is a talent development and enrichment programme. All recipients of the SP Scholarship will automatically be placed under this programme. Other eligible students will be invited to join SPOT based on their academic results or lecturers' recommendations.

=== EDGE Scholars Programme ===
The EDGE Programme is a by-invitation-only programme providing learning activities and development opportunities for SP's brightest students. At EDGE, they believe that students can be guided to achieve their fullest potential.

== Admissions ==
=== Direct Admission Exercise (DAE) ===
- For international students who sat for the GCE ‘O’ Levels as private candidates. International students with previous year’s GCE ‘O’ Level results will apply under this exercise.
- For former SP and other polytechnic students.
- For 'A' Level holders applying for the 2.5-year diploma courses.
- For ‘A’ Level holders applying for the 2 or 3-year diploma courses.
- Students from the Integrated Programme (IP) must have completed IP Year 4 (or Sec 4 equivalent).
- Students with the IB qualification must have a minimum grade (1st Language) for English, Maths, 1 Relevant Subject and 2 other subjects (Standard Level).
- Students with the UEC / SPM or STPM qualification are invited to apply.
- For students applying for admission to the Diploma course in Nautical Studies (DNS).

=== Early Admissions Exercise (EAE) ===
EAE is an admissions exercise that allows students to apply and receive conditional offers for admission to polytechnic based on their aptitudes and interests before taking their O-Level exams, or after completing their NITEC or Higher NITEC course at the Institute of Technical Education (ITE). This exercise replaced the Direct Polytechnic Admissions (DPA) and Joint Admission Exercise (JAE).

=== Polytechnic Foundation Programme Admission Exercise (PFPAE) ===
PFP is an admissions exercise that allows the top 10% of Normal Academic (NA) students to apply to a polytechnic without going through O-Level. PFP students will go through a one-year course, teaching them the foundations of subjects that will be needed in their diploma year. If the student passes PFP, they will move on to their diploma courses. Additional scholarships and awards are available to those who do well in their foundation year.

== Notable alumni ==
=== Academia ===
- Shih Choon Fong, college administrator
- Chai Keong Toh, computer scientist, engineer and professor
- Tan Chin Liong Lecturer of the Electronics and Communication Engineering department

=== Entertainment ===
- Tanya Chua, singer
- Cliff Tan, architect and author
- Taufik Batisah, singer and Singapore Idol winner
- Kelly Poon, singer
- Shigga Shay, Hip hop artist and songwriter
- Jarrell Huang, singer and SPOP Sing! winner
- Ivy Lee, actress and host

=== Politics and Public Service ===
- Kenneth Chen Koon Lap
- Cedric Foo, Minister of State for Defence (2002–2005), Minister of State for National Development (2004–2005), and Member of Parliament for West Coast GRC (2001–2011), and Pioneer SMC (2011–2020)
- Liang Eng Hwa, Member of Parliament for Bukit Panjang SMC (2020–present), and Holland–Bukit Timah GRC (2006–2020)
- Faisal Manap, Member of Parliament for Aljunied GRC (2011–2025)
- Png Eng Huat, Member of Parliament for Hougang SMC (2012–2020)

=== Other ===
- Leong Siew Chor, perpetrator of the Kallang River body parts murder
