= Kidnapping of Phang Tee Wah =

1989 kidnapping and murder of a goldsmith in Singapore

- Phang Tee Wah, the goldsmith who was kidnapped and murdered
- Date: 11 – 15 April 1989
- Location: Yishun, Singapore
- Outcome: Phang was murdered while being held hostage by the kidnappers Liow Han Heng and Ibrahim Masod; Ibrahim and Liow were both found guilty of murder and sentenced to death in 1992; Liow died from a heart attack while on death row at Changi Prison; Ibrahim was executed by hanging at Changi Prison in 1994
- Deaths: Phang Tee Wah (56)
- Injuries: None
- Convicted: Liow Han Heng (44); Ibrahim bin Masod (50)
- Verdict: Guilty
- Convictions: Murder
- Sentence: Death penalty

On 11 April 1989, 56-year-old goldsmith Phang Tee Wah (Chinese: 庞世华; pinyin: Páng Shìhuá) was kidnapped by two men before he was murdered. Despite his death, the kidnappers demanded ransom from Phang's family, who were kept in the dark about Phang's death as they contacted the police about their predicament and the crime. Subsequently, four days after Phang was killed, his corpse was discovered and the police were able to nab the two kidnappers - Phang's former employee Liow Han Heng (alias William Liow; Chinese: 廖汉兴; pinyin: Liào Hànxīng; Pe̍h-ōe-jī: Liāu Hàn-heng) and security guard Ibrahim bin Masod, who was Liow's friend and driver.

Both Liow and Ibrahim were charged with kidnapping and murder. The prosecution argued during the trial that both men had killed Phang to not allow him to identify them, while the respective defence counsel of both men argued there was no intention on both men's part to cause Phang's death. Following the rejection of their defences, Liow and Ibrahim were found guilty of the brutal abduction-murder of Phang and condemned to death on 23 July 1992. However, while he was incarcerated on death row, Liow suffered a heart attack and died on 10 August 1993. Ibrahim, on the other hand, was eventually put to death on 29 July 1994 after failing to overturn his death sentence through his appeals.

== Phang's abduction and murder ==
=== Kidnapping and death ===
At the time of his kidnapping, 56-year-old goldsmith Phang Tee Wah was the owner of Sin Wah Jewellers and Goldsmith in the Beauty World Centre on Bukit Timah Road. Phang was also in poor health due to issues such as heart condition and diabetes. On the morning of 11 April 1989, Phang was working in the shop with his wife Low Ah Kay, their eldest son and their daughter-in-law. Phang thereafter left the shop in the early afternoon. Sometime between 4pm and 5pm, Low Ah Kay received a phone call from individuals who told her in Hokkien that Phang, who was supposed to meet a friend at Thomson Plaza, was kidnapped by them, and they demanded a ransom of S$2 million to be paid within the next 3 days for his safe release.

Over ten phone calls were later made to Phang's wife and son, which similarly pushed for them to pay the ransom in return for Phang's safety, and instructed the family to sell the gold products of Phang's shop to raise the ransom. The callers also promised to send a phone recording of Phang's voice would be given to the family to let them know of his safety. Phang's family members negotiated with the kidnappers to reduce the ransom, and it was agreed that they would pay S$20,000 in exchange for Phang's release. However, they never paid up since there was a lack of guarantee that Phang was still alive. The police were contacted, and over 100 men were deployed to investigate the crime and monitor the situation, as well as identifying the suspects. The sudden reduction of ransom also made the police suspect that the kidnappers did not intend for Phang to come back alive.

Four days later, on the morning of 15 April 1989, a highly decomposed corpse was discovered abandoned at a secluded area around Pasir Ris, with the hands tied behind the back and a pillowcase covering the head. The police identified the deceased victim as Phang. Dr Wee Keng Poh, a forensic pathologist, performed an autopsy on the victim and concluded that Phang died from strangulation, and it was believed that the kidnappers had killed Phang by strangling him with raffia string. Within a few hours after the discovery of Phang's corpse, two suspects were arrested at Yishun and Kallang.

=== Murder charges ===
The two suspects were identified as 44-year-old Liow Han Heng and 50-year-old friend Ibrahim Masod. Liow was Phang's former employee while Ibrahim, who worked as a security guard, was Liow's friend and driver. It was revealed that Liow had worked for three to four months under Phang in 1984 before he resigned due to his underperforming work attitude and performance. As Ibrahim also had previous convictions for armed robbery, the Police Tactical Unit was deployed to arrest Ibrahim.

Liow and Ibrahim were both charged with murder on 17 April 1989. Their cases were later transferred to the High Court in September 1989 after some preliminary hearings by the district courts. The offence of murder carries the death penalty in Singapore if found guilty. Liow and Ibrahim also faced charges of kidnapping by ransom, which was punishable by either death or life imprisonment, with possible caning if the imposed sentence was life.

The director of CID Chua Cher Yak, in his public press conference, commended the efforts of the police investigators in catching the kidnappers, and that the extensive training of officers in anti-kidnap drills was crucial to helping the officers rendering timely response in kidnap cases. Before Phang's kidnapping and murder, the last kidnap-murder case occurred in May 1968, when a millionaire's 19-year-old son Ong Beang Leck was kidnapped and brutally killed by his captors. Three of the five abductors - Lee Chor Pet, Lim Kim Kwee and Ho Kee Fatt - were hanged in January 1973 for Ong's murder.

== Murder trial ==
=== Trial proceedings ===
Ibrahim Masod, the first accused

Liow Han Heng, the second accused

On 6 July 1992, both 47-year-old Liow Han Heng and 53-year-old Ibrahim bin Masod stood trial for the murder of 56-year-old Phang Tee Wah. The joint case of Liow and Ibrahim, together with the case of both Joseph Soon Kin Liang and Tan Chee Hwee who killed a Filipino maid during a burglary, became the first two cases to be heard by a single trial judge following the amendments to the Criminal Procedure Code. Veteran judge T. S. Sinnathuray, who formerly tried and sentenced infamous child killer Adrian Lim to death back in 1983, was appointed to hear the case of Liow and Ibrahim.

It was revealed from the men's accounts that they both had a plan to kidnap Phang in order to extort ransom from Phang's family. Both Ibrahim and Liow lured Phang to Liow's Yishun flat by pretending to arrange to meet up with him. After the trio arrived at Liow's flat, Phang was tied up and gagged by the two kidnappers, and even stole Phang's watch. According to their admissions to police, Ibrahim and Liow separately called Phang's family to demand for a ransom of S$2 million and Ibrahim also went outside to sell Phang's watch for S$6,200 under a false identity. From this point, the prosecution, led by Christine Lee, alleged that the men had killed Phang with the purpose of silencing the goldsmith to avoid him from identifying both of them. The forensic pathologist, Dr Wee Keng Poh, testified that according to his autopsy results, he determined that Phang, who died from strangulation, had strangulation marks around the neck, and these bruises showed there was likely one or two persons strangling him with great force.

Ibrahim (represented by defence lawyer N Ganesan and Peter Cuthbert Low), who first made his defence, denied that he was involved in Phang's murder despite admitting to the kidnapping. He stated that Liow alone committed the killing while he was outside all the while selling the watch, and he only knew of Phang's death when Liow asked him to buy cardboard to dispose of the corpse. He stated he only did what he was told, and only helped to drive the vehicle and kidnap the goldsmith but not to kill him. Liow (represented by Thomas Tham and Anthony Lim Heng Yong), on the other hand, did not deny his responsibility in Phang's death but he claimed it was unintentional, as Phang apparently died due to suffocation from Liow gagging the victim on the mouth too much and he even called on a Malaysian doctor to testify that Phang did not die from strangulation as certified by Dr Wee. Liow also stated that at one point before Phang's death, he tried to get Phang to agree with him to commit insurance fraud in exchange for releasing the victim but Phang refused. The prosecution sought to discredit Ibrahim's defence as lies to absolve himself of his responsibility of the crime and rebutted Liow's defence, and they also argued that regardless of whoever being the person strangling Phang, they were both guilty in lieu of the common intention to commit kidnapping, since the murder was committed in concert of their intention to abduct Phang.

=== Verdict ===
On 23 July 1992, the trial judge T. S. Sinnathuray released his verdict. He rejected the defences of Liow and Ibrahim, finding that Liow had intentionally strangled Phang with the intention of causing his death, and that Ibrahim should be held equally responsible for the murder of Phang given that the victim died as a result of his abetment of Liow's actions, and the strangulation of Phang was made in furtherance of the common intention shared by both men to kidnap Phang for ransom. As such, both 47-year-old Liow Han Heng and 53-year-old Ibrahim bin Masod were found guilty of murder and condemned to death.

In response to her husband being sentenced to death, Ibrahim's wife, who often came to court with their four-year-old daughter, wept at the verdict, while Phang's widow applauded the verdict and told the press that "justice was served" for her husband and she found peace with the judgement.

== Death of Liow Han Heng ==
On 10 August 1993, while he was at Changi Prison awaiting his execution, 48-year-old Liow Han Heng was found dead inside his prison cell. His cause of death was later certified as a heart attack. According to his lawyers, Liow was originally set to file his final appeal to the Court of Appeal on the same day as his co-accused Ibrahim bin Masod, with the purpose of seeking to overturn his death sentence and the murder conviction. However, due to the unexpected death of Liow, on 19 October 1993, the date of the scheduled appeal hearing, Liow's lawyers applied to the Court of Appeal to his appeal to be abated. The application was later granted.

== Ibrahim's appeal ==
On 19 October 1993, two months after the death of Liow Han Heng, his 54-year-old accomplice Ibrahim bin Masod alone appealed to overturn his conviction and sentence, but the Court of Appeal dismissed his appeal on 11 November 1993.

The three Judges of Appeal - M Karthigesu, Goh Joon Seng and Chao Hick Tin - deemed that Ibrahim was an active party to Liow's abduction even though he may have played a smaller role than Liow, who committed premeditated murder. They referred to his actions of him driving the get-away car, his luring of Phang to meet with the two men, disposing of Phang's corpse, calling Phang's family for ransom, and even stole Phang's watch to sell for money, which painted him as a willing party of abetment to Liow's crime, and they had no doubt that the strangulation of Phang was facilitated in furtherance of the common intention shared by both Ibrahim and Liow to kidnap Phang, and therefore Ibrahim should bear the full consequences of his abetment to the kidnapping and murder of Phang. As such, the death sentence of Ibrahim was upheld through the dismissal of his appeal.

Subsequently, then President of Singapore Ong Teng Cheong also declined to commute Ibrahim's sentence to life imprisonment and thus rejected Ibrahim's plea for clemency.

== Ibrahim's execution ==
On 29 July 1994, for the charge of murdering Phang Tee Wah while holding him hostage back in 1989, 55-year-old Ibrahim bin Masod was hanged at Changi Prison. He was executed on the same date at the same timing as four other criminals (two for murder and two for drug trafficking), including odd-job labourer Goh Hong Choon who killed a ten-year-old schoolgirl by strangulation during a robbery in April 1991.

In the aftermath, the case was later re-enacted by Singaporean crime show Crimewatch in 1995. The case of Phang's kidnapping would be recalled once again in September 1999, when a 14-year-old schoolgirl was kidnapped by Vincent Lee Chuan Leong and two others for a S$500,000 ransom. Although the girl was released unharmed after her father paid $330,000 per a negotiated ransom deal, Lee and his accomplices were all arrested and sentenced to life imprisonment in April 2000.

== See also ==
- List of kidnappings
- Capital punishment in Singapore
