= Tam's Burgers =

American restaurant chain

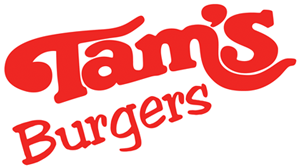
- Company type: Private
- Industry: Foodservice
- Genre: Fast food
- Founded: 1971; 54 years ago
- Founder: Kostas Vovos
- Number of locations: 12+ (2022)
- Products: Hamburgers; chicken; sandwiches; salads; breakfast; desserts
- Owner: Sprio Vovos

Tam's Burgers is an American restaurant chain based in Southern California. Founded in 1971, it has been seen as a symbol of Compton, California.

The restaurant is not to be confused with another chain based in Southern California that has the same name. That chain split from the original Tam's in 1992 and serves the Inland Empire, with six locations.

== History ==
Tam's Burgers was founded in 1971 by Kostas Vovos. His grandson, Spiro, owns the restaurant as of 2022.

== Locations ==
The chain has over twelve locations in Los Angeles County.

== In popular culture ==
Kendrick Lamar mentioned the chain in his 2017 song "ELEMENT.", rapping "I be hangin' out at Tam's, I be on Stockton / I don't do it for the 'Gram, I do it for Compton". The set for the Super Bowl LVI halftime show in 2022 included a sign from Tam's Burgers #21 and references to many other Compton landmarks as a tribute to the African-American culture of the Los Angeles area. Lamar is also seen eating at the chain in the music video for his 2024 song "Not Like Us" alongside the song's producer, Mustard.
