= Tamtam, Iran =

Tamtam تم تم
- Village
- Location within Iran
- Coordinates: 34°38′22″N 46°38′09″E
- Country: Iran
- Province: Kermanshah
- County: Ravansar
- Bakhsh: Central
- Rural District: Hasanabad

Population (2006)
  - Total: 258
- Time zone: UTC+3:30 (IRST)
  - Summer (DST): UTC+4:30 (IRDT)

Tamtam (Persian: تم تم) is a village in Hasanabad Rural District, in the Central District of Ravansar County, Kermanshah Province, Iran. At the 2006 census, its population was 258, in 55 families.
