= Tam (name) =

Tam is a short form of Thomas in Scots, a nickname and a surname. It may refer to:

== Thomas ==
- Tam Dean Burn (born 1958), Scottish actor
- Tam Courts (born 1981), Scottish footballer
- Tam Dalyell of the Binns (1615–1685), Scottish Royalist general in the Wars of the Three Kingdoms
- Tam Dalyell (1932–2017), Scottish politician and Member of Parliament (1962-2005)
- Tam Galbraith (1917–1982), Scottish politician
- Thomas McGraw (1952–2007), Scottish gangster
- Tam McManus (born 1981), Scottish former footballer

== Nickname or other first name ==
- Chudaree Debhakam nicknamed "Tam", Thai chef awarded two Michelin stars.
- Tamunoemi "Tam" David-West (1936–2019), Nigerian academic, social critic and former federal minister
- Tam Joseph (born 1947), Dominica-born British painter formerly known as Tom Joseph
- Tam or Tom Kellichan (born c. 1954), Scottish musician, The Skids original drummer (1977–1979)
- Tam Lenfestey (1818–1885), Guernsey poet
- Tamandani "Tam" Nsaliwa (born 1982), Malawian footballer
- Walter Sumner "Tam" Rose (1888–1961), American football player and head coach
- Hubert Tamblyn "Tam" Spiva (1932–2017), American television screenwriter of The Brady Bunch and Gentle Ben

== Surname ==
- the Cantonese romanisation of Tan (surname) (譚), a common Chinese surname
- Reuben Tam (1916–1991), American artist
- Rabbeinu Tam (1100–1171), Rabbi Jacob Tam
- Rod Tam (1953–2019), American businessman and politician
- Theresa Tam (born 1965), Canadian physician

== Fictional characters ==
- River Tam and Simon Tam, fictional characters/siblings from Firefly
- Tam Song, supporting character in the book series Keeper of The Lost Cities by Shannon Messenger
- Tam Amber, supporting character in The Ballad of Songbirds and Snakes by Suzanne Collins
- Tam al’Thor, supporting character and the father of the Dragon Reborn in The Wheel of Time by Robert Jordan
- Tam Mullen, supporting character in Scottish sitcom Still Game.

== See also ==
- Tamm (surname)
- John Tams (born 1949), English actor, singer, songwriter, composer and musician
