= Technological Association Malaysia =

Professional association and learned society of technology and engineering

- Persatuan Teknologi Malaysia
- Abbreviation: TAM
- Founded: April 15, 1946; 80 years ago
- Founded at: Selangor
- Type: Learned society
- Registration no.: PPM-001-10-14021951
- Legal status: Nonprofit organization
- Purpose: Technological and engineering sciences
- Headquarters: Subang Jaya
- Location: Johor, Kedah, Malacca, Negeri Sembilan, Penang, Perak, Perlis, Sabah, Sarawak, Selangor
- Coordinates: 3.04712°N 101.58766°E
- Origins: 1932
- Region served: Malaysia, Singapore
- Method: Conferences, distinguished lectures, webinars, technical visits
- Fields: Electrical & electronic, information & computing, chemical, telecommunication & broadcasting, biotechnology, building & construction, resource based survey & geomatics, manufacturing & industrial, agro-based, cyber security, transportation & logistic, material science, marine, maritime, atmospheric science & environment, green, oil & gas, automotive, aerospace & aviation, food, nano, nuclear & radiological, art design & creative multimedia, health & medical
- Members: 3,000+ (2025)
- Official language: English
- President: Tung Chee Kuan
- Deputy President: Louis Tay Chee Siong
- Honorary General Secretary: Ong Seng Keong
- Main organ: Annual general meeting
- Affiliations: MBOT, AER, AFEO, NAICO, JPT, JPK, GMI, UTAR, UPSI, KPKT, SIET, IEM
- Staff: Haidah Ahmad (2023)
- Website: www.tam.org.my
- Formerly called: The Technical Association of Malaya, The Technical Association of Malaysia and Singapore, The Technical Association of Malaysia, The Technological Association of Malaysia

The Technological Association Malaysia is a professional association and learned society for technological and engineering sciences with its corporate office in Subang Jaya and its branch building in Seremban. It was founded on 15 April 1946 in Selangor, and has been verified by The Malaysia Book of Records as the oldest technical civil society.

== Membership grades ==
TAM attracts people with wide scope of interests in many disciplines. An individual can be elected as a student member, associate, member, or fellow. Institutional membership is available for organizations. There are several grades of TAM membership:

=== Corporate Membership ===
1. Fellow
2. Member

=== Non-Corporate Membership ===
1. Honorary Fellow
2. Honorary Member
3. Graduate Member
4. Student Member
5. Associate
6. Institutional Member

== Post-nominal letters ==
Under Rule 13 (b) of the Memorandum and Article of Association of TAM, elected individuals are entitled to use the following post-nominal letters in accordance with their membership grades:

1. Hon. FTAM for Honorary Fellows
2. Hon. MTAM for Honorary Members
3. FTAM for Fellows; LFTAM for Life Fellows
4. MTAM for Members; LMTAM for Life Members
5. Grad. TAM for Graduate Members
6. Stud. TAM for Student Members
7. Assoc. TAM for Associates
