= Plaza (singer) =

PLAZA
- Born: Michael Kaminski
- Origin: Ottawa, Ontario, Canada
- Genre: Alternative R&B
- Years active: 2016–present
- Labels: Shadow Records Inc. (current): Gold Sound Entertainment (former); OVO (former); Warner Bros. (former)

Michael Kaminski, known professionally as PLAZA, is a Canadian singer and songwriter raised in Ottawa, Ontario. He is known for his singles "Personal", "All Mine", and "Use Me". From 2017 to 2021, he was signed to OVO Sound, the record label co-founded by rapper Drake, producer Noah "40" Shebib and Oliver El-Khatib.

== Early life ==
Kaminski was raised in Ottawa, Ontario, and was shaped by the Toronto music scene. During the early 2010s, he started out as a lead singer in a pop-punk band called Decades, as well as a synth-pop band called Lobby.

== Music career ==
=== 2016-2017: One and OVO Sound ===
PLAZA began his solo career in 2016, initially keeping his identity private. His debut EP, One, was released independently that year after he had gradually shared its songs online.

In November 2016, The Fader premiered his single "Personal". Later that month, the song was included in Complex's "The Best Canadian Songs Of November". Now Toronto named him among its Toronto musicians to watch in 2017 and BuzzFeed included him in its list of artists to watch that year.

In June 2017, PLAZA signed a record deal with Drake's OVO Sound label. In doing so, he became the first artist to join in over a year, following the signing of R&B duo dvsn in February 2016. The news broke during an episode of OVO Sound Radio, with El-Khatib debuting PLAZA's second EP, Shadow, at the end of the show, and describing him as the "newest member of the OVO Sound family". The five-track project included "Personal", "Karma", "Run This", "Love You Again" and "Over".

On December 22, Plaza released the singles "All Mine" and "Pick Up".

=== 2018-2020: Final OVO releases and hiatus ===
PLAZA continued releasing music through OVO Sound and Warner Records following Shadow. In 2018, he released the singles "Switch" and "Touch & Go". He then stepped away from releasing music for several years.

=== 2021-2023: Independence, Nocturnes and Avalon ===
In 2021, PLAZA left OVO Sound and formed his own label, Shadow Records Inc. According to his official biography, he chose to step away from the major label system to retain ownership and creative control of his work.

He returned with "Still Alive", the first of three singles leading up to his debut studio album, followed by "Use Me" and "Get Even". Nocturnes was released independently through Shadow Records Inc. on October 1, 2021, and contains eleven tracks.

Plaza continued releasing music independently in 2022, including the singles "Demons", "Crash", "Never Left My Mind", "Voodoo" and "Voodoo II".

Ahead of his next project, he released the singles "Tragedy", "Who Is He", "Answer Me" and "Other Side". Following, his EP Avalon was released through Shadow Records Inc. on October 27, 2023, and contains nine tracks, including "Voodoo" and "Voodoo II".

=== 2024-present: Independent releases ===
PLAZA released the singles "Emily", "I've Got Nothing" and "Favors" in 2024. In 2025, he released "When You Miss Me", "Raw", "Pregnant" and "Lost". He returned in 2026 with "Angels", released in June, followed by "All Over Me" on September 18.

== Artistry ==
=== Musical style ===
PLAZA's music has been described as alternative and contemporary R&B, marked by atmospheric production and a hushed, restrained vocal style. His work frequently draws on late-night and nocturnal themes.

PLAZA's music has often been compared to the early style of The Weeknd. He addressed the similarities in 2016, saying: "I don't like to make comparisons. I'm really trying to be my own artist." Critics have also compared his musical style to PartyNextDoor, as well as underground artists Anders and K. Forest.

Speaking about his style, Plaza said: "I want my music to feel like a soundtrack for anyone driving at night. I have visuals always playing in the studio—city lights or slow drives through the town. It's that late-night sound, something you listen to while cruising."

== Discography ==
=== Studio albums ===
Title	Album details
Nocturnes	Released: October 1, 2021; Label: Shadow Records Inc.; Formats: Digital download, streaming

=== Extended plays ===
Title	EP details
One	Released: August 29, 2016; Label: Gold Sound Entertainment; Formats: Digital download, streaming
Shadow	Released: June 10, 2017; Label: OVO Sound, Warner Bros.; Formats: Digital download, streaming
Avalon	Released: October 27, 2023; Label: Shadow Records; Formats: Digital download, streaming

=== Singles ===
Title	Year	Album/EP
"Personal"	2016	Shadow
"Over"	2017	Shadow
"All Mine"	2017	Non-album singles
"Pick Up"	2017	Non-album singles
"Switch"	2018	Non-album singles
"Touch & Go"	2018	Non-album singles
"Still Alive"	2021	Nocturnes
"Use Me"	2021	Nocturnes
"Get Even"	2021	Nocturnes
"Demons"	2022	Non-album single
"Crash"	2022	Non-album single
"Never Left My Mind"	2022	Non-album single
"Voodoo"	2022	Avalon
"Voodoo II"	2022	Avalon
"Tragedy"	2022	Avalon
"Who Is He"	2023	Avalon
"Answer Me"	2023	Avalon
"Other Side"	2023	Avalon
"Emily"	2024	Non-album single
"I've Got Nothing"	2024	Non-album single
"Favors"	2024	Non-album single
"When You Miss Me"	2025	Non-album single
"Raw"	2025	Non-album single
"Pregnant"	2025	Non-album single
"Lost"	2025	Non-album single
"Angels"	2026	Non-album single
"All Over Me"	2026	Non-album single
