= A Muse in Her Feelings =

A Muse In Her Feelings

Studio album by dvsn
- Released: April 17, 2020
- Recorded: 2019–20
- Genre: R&B
- Length: 56:34
- Label: OVO; Warner
- Producer: Nineteen85; 40; Allen Ritter; Amorphous; Bryan-Michael Cox; Jandre Amos; Joe Reeves; Jordan Ullman; Jordon Manswell; Noah Breakfast; Noel Cadastre; Raaheim; Robin Hannibal; Stwo

Dvsn chronology
Morning After (2017)	A Muse In Her Feelings (2020)	Cheers to the Best Memories (2021)

Singles from A Muse in Her Feelings
- 1. "Miss Me?" Released: July 10, 2019; 2. "No Cryin" Released: October 30, 2019; 3. "A Muse" Released: January 17, 2020; 4. "Between Us" Released: March 19, 2020; 5. "Dangerous City" Released: April 10, 2020; 6. "Blessings" Released: December 18, 2020; 7. "Use Somebody" Released: January 8, 2021

A Muse in Her Feelings is the third studio album by Canadian R&B duo dvsn. It was released on April 17, 2020, via OVO Sound and Warner Records. Production was handled mainly by Paul "Nineteen85" Jefferies, along with Allen Ritter, Bryan-Michael Cox, Robin Hannibal and Stevn "Stwo" Vidal among others. It features guest appearances from Buju Banton, Future, Jessie Reyez, PartyNextDoor, Popcaan, Shantel May, Snoh Aalegra, Summer Walker and Ty Dolla Sign. On July 10, 2020 a chopped and screwed remix was released by DJ Candlestick and OG Ron C of The Chopstars. On January 15, 2021, the deluxe EP Amusing Her Feelings was released, with a guest appearance from Miguel.

== Singles and promotion ==
On July 10, 2019, they released two singles: "Miss Me?" and "In Between", although only the former was included on the final tracklist. On October 30, 2019, they released "No Cryin" featuring Future. They followed up this release by releasing "A Muse" and "Between Us" featuring Snoh Aalegra, the latter being a remake of the 2019 single "In Between". On April 10, 2020, they released "Dangerous City" featuring Ty Dolla Sign and Buju Banton.

On December 18, 2021, dvsn released "Blessings" as the first single from the deluxe EP Amusing Her Feelings. "Use Somebody" was released on January 8, 2021, as the second deluxe single.

== Critical reception ==
Professional ratings
Aggregate scores
Source	Rating
Metacritic	78/100
Review scores
Source	Rating
CLASH	7/10
Exclaim!	8/10
NME	4/5 stars
Pitchfork	7/10
The Line of Best Fit	8/10

A Muse in Her Feelings was met with generally favorable reviews from critics. At Metacritic, which assigns a weighted average rating out of 100 to reviews from mainstream publications, this release received an average score of 78, based on five reviews.

Steven Loftin of The Line of Best Fit wrote, "From the harp-tinged starter of "No Good", far across the twinkling lights, broken hearts and epiphany, to thunderous claps of "...Again" A Muse in Her Feelings holds itself aloft, floating dreamily on a sea of feeling". Kyle Mullin of Exclaim! said, "For now, this new album stands as a kinetic encapsulation of heartache, and a strong showcase — for not only this exciting Toronto duo, but also many of their local powerhouse peers like Reyez, May and PARTYNEXTDOOR". Kyann-Sian Williams of NME praised the album saying that dvsn "have delivered a modern R&B record well worth celebrating; the duo have poured out their feelings and opened up an emotional conversation with the listener. Star-studded, shimmering, danceable and intimate, A Muse In Her Feelings is R&B in its purest form". Rawiya Kameir of Pitchfork stated, "The album's most interesting stretch is a risky three-track run that begins with the playful outro of "Outlandish", builds into the Baltimore club-referencing "Keep It Going" and crests with the lusty "'Flawless' Do It Well, Pt. 3", featuring Summer Walker in the role of an unflappable stripper. ... Even though there are songs with infinite replay value, the album doesn't quite have the depth, either". David Weaver of CLASH said, "With their modest personas and its subtle production, it could be easy to disregard dvsn's third record as more of the same, but repeat listens reveal a warm and unpretentious record, from an act confidently starting to evolve".

== Track listing ==
A Muse in Her Feelings track listing
No.	Title	Writer(s)	Producer(s)	Length
1.	"No Good"	Daniel Daley; Paul Jefferies; Jason Amos; James Fauntleroy; Jordon Manswell	Nineteen85; Manswell; Jandre Amos (co.)	3:35
2.	"Friends" (featuring PARTYNEXTDOOR)	Daley; Jefferies; Jahron Anthony Brathwaite; Noel Cadastre; Noah Shebib; Aubrey Graham; James Samuel Harris III; Terry Steven Lewis	Cadastre; 40 (add.); Nineteen85 (co.)	3:08
3.	"Still Pray for You"	Daley; Jefferies; Raheim Hurlock; Joe Reeves; J. L. Bedel	Nineteen85; Raaheim (co.)	2:12
4.	"Courtside" (featuring Jessie Reyez)	Daley; Jefferies; Jessie Reyez; Jeff Crake; Reeves; James Vincent McMorrow	Nineteen85	3:56
5.	"Miss Me?"	Daley; Jefferies; Steven Vidal; Fauntleroy	Nineteen85; Stwo	3:40
6.	"No Cryin" (featuring Future)	Daley; Jefferies; Nayvadius Wilburn; Bryan-Michael Cox; Kandise Nathan; Keyona Reed; Shontell Moore	Nineteen85; Cox	3:24
7.	"Dangerous City" (with Ty Dolla $ign featuring Buju Banton)	Daley; Jefferies; Mark Myrie; Tyrone Griffin Jr.; Noah Beresin; Robin Hannibal	Nineteen85; Noah Breakfast; Hannibal	4:06
8.	"So What" (featuring Popcaan)	Daley; Jefferies; Andrae Sutherland; Allen Ritter; Hurlock	Nineteen85; Raaheim; Ritter (co.)	3:15
9.	"Outlandish"	Daley; Jefferies; T. Bryant	Nineteen85	2:46
10.	"Keep It Going"	Daley; Jefferies; Jordan Ullman; H. Matthews; Nija Charles; T. Ahmed	Nineteen85; Ullman	3:53
11.	"Flawless (Do It Well Pt. 3)" (featuring Summer Walker)	Daley; Jefferies; Summer Walker; Hurlock; D. Jones; T. Bryant	Nineteen85; Raaheim	3:51
12.	"Greedy"	Daley; Jefferies; Fauntleroy; B. Robertson	Nineteen85	2:57
13.	"Between Us" (featuring Snoh Aalegra)	Daley; Jefferies; Shahrzad Fooladi; Reeves; Jermaine Dupri; Usher Raymond; B. Casey; M. Semaj; M.L. Seal Jr.	Nineteen85; Amorphous (add.)	3:04
14.	"A Muse"	Daley; Jefferies; Ritter; Crake; Hurlock; Lonnie Liston Smith; T. Bryant	Ritter; Nineteen85 (co.)	3:42
15.	"For Us"	Daley; Jefferies; Cox	Nineteen85; Cox	4:33
16.	"...Again" (featuring Shantel May)	Daley; Jefferies; Reeves; Ritter; Crake; Hurlock; S. Marquardt	Nineteen85; Reeves (co.)	4:32
Total length:				56:34

Amusing Her Feelings – Deluxe EP
No.	Title	Writer(s)	Producer(s)	Length
1.	"She Said"	Daniel Daley; Jefferies; Sean Seaton	Nineteen85; Neenyo	3:07
2.	"He Said" (featuring Miguel)	Daley; Jefferies; Miguel Pimentel	Nineteen85	3:11
3.	"Blessings"	Daley; Jefferies; K. Carr; Jordon Manswell; James Fauntleroy; E. Clark	Jordon Manswell; Nineteen85	4:43
4.	"Use Somebody"	Caleb Followill; Nathan Followill; Jared Followill; Matthew Followill	Nineteen85	4:30

Notes

- "Miss Me?" features additional vocals by Ty Dolla $ign
- "Dangerous City" features additional vocals by Mecca Don Villan
- "Outlandish" and "Flawless (Do It Well Pt. 3)" features additional vocals by HaSizzle
- "Keep It Going" features additional vocals by HaSizzle and LOU VAL
- "Greedy" features additional vocals by James Fauntleroy

Sample Credits

- "Friends" contains elements of "Just Be Good to Me", written by James Samuel Harris III and Terry Steven Lewis, and performed by The SOS Band.
- "Still Pray for You" contains elements of "This is the Place", written by Joe Bendell, and performed by Kansas City Express.
- "No Cryin" contains samples of "Boss Ass Bitch", written by Kandise Nathan, Keyona Reed and Shontell Moore, and performed by PTAF.
- "Flawless (Do It Well Pt. 3)" contains samples of "Get It Together", written by Donell Jones, and performed by 702.
- "Between Us" contains a sample from "Nice & Slow", written by Jermaine Dupri, Usher Raymond, Brandon Casey, M.L. Seal Jr. and Brian Casey, and performed by Usher.
- "A Muse" contains a sample of "A Garden of Peace", written and performed by Lonnie Liston Smith.

== Charts ==
Chart performance for A Muse in Her Feelings
Chart (2020)	Peak position
Canadian Albums (Billboard)	13
French Albums (SNEP)	139
UK Albums (OCC)	50
US Billboard 200	23
