= Say Less (album) =

Studio album by Roy Woods
- Released: December 1, 2017
- Recorded: 2016–17
- Studio: Diamond Factory, Greensboro, NC; The Remix Project, Toronto, ON; Vivian's Labrynth, Brampton, ON; Cherry Beach, Toronto, ON; S.O.T.A., Toronto, ON
- Genre: Alternative R&B
- Length: 56:35
- Label: OVO; Warner
- Producer: Charlie Handsome; David Gud; dF; Dzeko; FKi 1st; FrancisGotHeat; Fvders; Luca; Maneesh; Murda Beatz; Nineteen85; Prep Bijan; Prezident Jeff; Roy Woods; S.L.M.N.; Stwo

Roy Woods chronology
| Nocturnal (2016) | Say Less (2017) |

Singles from Say Less
- 1. "What Are You On?" Released: July 21, 2017

Professional ratings
Review scores
| Source | Rating |
|---|---|
| HipHopDX | 4/5 stars |
| Pitchfork | 6.3/10 |
| AllMusic | 3/5 stars |

Say Less is the second studio album by Canadian recording artist Roy Woods. The album was released on December 1, 2017, by Drake's OVO Sound and Warner Records. It features guest appearances from OVO labelmates PartyNextDoor and Dvsn, alongside 24hrs and PnB Rock. It is preceded by one single; "What Are You On?".

== Background ==
On March 9, 2017, the album's title was announced by Roy Woods via Twitter. The tracklist, release date and pre-order for the album was revealed on November 17, 2017.

== Singles ==
The first promotional single, "Say Less" was released on the November 17, 2017, same date of the album's tracklist and release date reveal. The second promotional single, "Balance" featuring Dvsn and PnB Rock was released on November 23, 2017.

The lead single, "What Are You On?" was released on July 21, 2017.

== Promotion ==
=== Tour ===
On January 30, 2018, Roy Woods announced an official headlining concert tour to further promote the album titled Say Less Tour. The tour began on March 17, 2018, in Orlando, at Backbooth.

Tour dates
| Date | City | Country | Venue |
North America
| March 17, 2018 | Orlando | United States | Backbooth |
| March 20, 2018 | Atlanta | United States | The Masquerade |
| March 22, 2018 | Chicago | United States | Bottom Lounge |
| March 23, 2018 | Ann Arbor | United States | University of Michigan |
| March 24, 2018 | Grand Rapids | United States | The Intersection |
| March 27, 2018 | Denver | United States | Summit Music Hall |
| March 30, 2018 | Los Angeles | United States | The Novo |
| March 31, 2018 | Los Angeles | United States | The Observatory North Park |
| April 1, 2018 | Santa Ana | United States | The Observatory Orange County |
| April 3, 2018 | San Francisco | United States | Regency Ballroom |
| April 4, 2018 | Santa Cruz | United States | The Catalyst Club |
| April 6, 2018 | Santa Barbara | United States | Velvet Jones |
| April 8, 2018 | Sacramento | United States | Harlow's |
| April 10, 2018 | Seattle | United States | The Showbox |
| April 12, 2018 | Vancouver | Canada | Vogue Theatre |
| April 14, 2018 | Edmonton | Canada | Union Hall |
| April 15, 2018 | Calgary | Canada | Palace Theatre |
| April 17, 2018 | Winnipeg | Canada | Garrick Centre |
| April 20, 2018 | Montreal | Canada | Corona Theatre |
| April 22, 2018 | Philadelphia | United States | Theatre of Living Arts |
| April 25, 2018 | Washington | United States | Union Stage |
| April 26, 2018 | Boston | United States | The Middle East |
| May 1, 2018 | New York City | United States | Irving Plaza |
| May 8, 2018 | Toronto | Canada | Danforth Music Hall |

== Track listing ==
Credits adapted from the album's liner notes and BMI.

| No. | Title | Writer(s) | Producer(s) | Length |
|---|---|---|---|---|
| 1. | "Medusa" | Denzel Spencer; Jeffrey Offe; Sunny Khokhar; Auggie Hurst | Prezident Jeff | 3:56 |
| 2. | "Little Bit of Lovin" | Spencer; Maneesh Bidaye | Maneesh | 2:52 |
| 3. | "Say Less" | Spencer; Luca Polizzi; Mohamed Sulaiman; Anders Ly; Laith Hakeem | Luca; S.L.M.N. | 3:07 |
| 4. | "Take Time" (featuring 24hrs) | Spencer; Robert Davis; Shane Lindstrom; Ryan Vojtesak | Murda Beatz; Charlie Handsome | 3:23 |
| 5. | "Something New" | Spencer; Julian Dzeko; Julian Raposo; Raynford Humphrey; Steven Resendes | Dzeko | 3:34 |
| 6. | "Top Left" | Spencer; Offe | Prezident Jeff | 2:58 |
| 7. | "BB" | Spencer; Francis Nguyen-Tran | FrancisGotHeat | 3:56 |
| 8. | "Back It Up" (featuring PartyNextDoor) | Spencer; Jahron Brathwaite; David Hughes; Farid Whitaker | Prep Bijan; Fvders | 4:28 |
| 9. | "Glasses" | Spencer; Offe; Sulaiman; Hughes; Whitaker | Prezident Jeff; S.L.M.N.; Prep Bijan; Fvders | 2:58 |
| 10. | "The Way You Sex" | Spencer; Darren Fraser | dF | 3:55 |
| 11. | "Monday to Monday" | Spencer; Trocon Roberts; Idan Kalai | FKi 1st | 4:32 |
| 12. | "What Are You On?" | Spencer; Steven Vidal; Khokhar | Stwo | 3:16 |
| 13. | "Balance" (featuring Dvsn and PnB Rock) | Spencer; Paul Jefferies; Daniel Daley; Rakim Allen | Nineteen85 | 3:42 |
| 14. | "In the Club" | Spencer; Nguyen-Tran; Khokhar | FrancisGotHeat | 3:15 |
| 15. | "B-Town" | Spencer; Nguyen-Tran; Khokhar | FrancisGotHeat | 3:46 |
| 16. | "Undivided" | Spencer; Nguyen-Tran; David Wud; Khokhar; Steven Resendes | FrancisGotHeat; Roy Woods; Wud | 2:57 |
| Total length: | | | | 56:35 |

Notes

- "Balance" features additional vocals by Jessie Ware and Daniel Dove

== Personnel ==
All programming and instrumentation is credited to the producers of each track, including where noted.

Musicians

- Sunny Khokhar – all instruments, programming (tracks 1, 2, 4, 6, 7, 10, 12, 14–16)
- Steven Resendes – all instruments, programming (track 5)

Technical

- Sunny Diamonds – recording (track 1–4, 6–9, 12, 14–16), mixing (all tracks)
- Pro Logic – recording (track 5)
- FKi 1st – recording (track 11)
- Noel "Gadget" Campbell – mixing (all tracks)
- Noah "40" Shebib – mixing assistance (all tracks)
- Greg Moffett – mixing assistance (all tracks)
- Harley Arsenault – mixing assistance (all tracks)
- Greg Morrison – mixing assistance (all tracks)
- Chris Athens – mastering (all tracks)
- David "DC" Castro – mastering assistance (all tracks)

Additional personnel

- UTU Management – creative direction
- Mudasser Ali – creative direction
- Diana Spencer – art direction

== Charts ==
| Chart (2017) | Peak position |
|---|---|
| Canadian Albums (Billboard) | 26 |
| US Billboard 200 | 92 |
| US Top R&B/Hip-Hop Albums (Billboard) | 38 |
| Dutch Albums (Album Top 100) | 159 |
