= FrancisGotHeat =

Canadian record producer and songwriter

- Also known as: FGH
- Born: Francis Bach Hoang Nguyen-Tran; 1996 (age 29–30); Toronto, Ontario, Canada
- Genres: Hip hop; trap; R&B
- Occupations: Record producer; songwriter
- Instruments: FL Studio; keyboard
- Years active: 2012–present

Francis Bach Hoang Nguyen-Tran (born 1996), known professionally as FrancisGotHeat, is a Canadian record producer and songwriter. He is best known for his production with several well-known artists, most notably Drake, Bryson Tiller, and Big Sean.

== Early life and career ==
Francis was born in Toronto in 1996, where he was also raised by Vietnamese Catholic parents. He was brought up in a musical household and has five siblings.

Francis has been described as a child prodigy, due to his musical background. His work has been featured in publications such as Vice, CBC News, and Exclaim!, among others.

In late December 2020, he was Grammy nominated for the Grammy Award for Best Reggae Album, for his production work on Jamaican singer-songwriter Skip Marley's song, “Higher Place". He also signed with American record producer Malay.

== Selected production discography ==
Selected production discography of FrancisGotHeat

Artist	Song	Album (label year)
Tre Mission	"Money Make (Her)"; Produced for Big Dada Recordings	Stigmata (2014)
Roy Woods	"Jealousy"; Produced for OVO Sound and Warner Records	Exis (2015)
Kidd Kidd	"Favors"; Produced for WalkLikeUs and RLLNR	Fuk Da Fame (2015)
Ab-Soul	"Evil Genius"; Produced for Top Dawg Entertainment	Do What Thou Wilt. (2016)
Tre Mission	"On A Wave"; Produced for No Such Thing	On A Wave (2016)
Roy Woods	"Switch"; Produced for OVO Sound and Warner Records	Waking At Dawn (2016)
Roy Woods	"Innocence" Produced for OVO Sound and Warner Records	Exis (2015)
Tre Mission	"On A Wave"	(2016)
Roy Woods	"Gwan Big Up Yourself" Produced for OVO Sound	Waking at Dawn (2016)
Roy Woods	"She Knows About Me" Produced for OVO Sound	Waking at Dawn (2016)
Roy Woods	"Sonic Boom" Produced for OVO Sound	Waking at Dawn (2016)
Roy Woods	"Switch" Produced for OVO Sound	Waking at Dawn (2016)
Zeina	"Hit Me Up"	(2016)
Bay Campbell	"I Know"	Up N6XT- Mixtape (2016)
Isaiah Rashad	"4r da Squaw" Produced for Top Dawg Entertainment	The Sun's Tirade (2016)
Ab-Soul	"D.R.U.G.S." Produced for Top Dawg Entertainment	Do What Thou Wilt (2016)
Roy Woods	"Chilli Peppers" Produced for OVO Sound	Nocturnal (2016)
Roy Woods	"Four Seasons" Produced for OVO Sound	Nocturnal (2016)
Roy Woods	"Love You" Produced for OVO Sound	Nocturnal (2016)
Roy Woods	"Magic" Produced for OVO Sound	Nocturnal (2016)
Bryson Tiller	"Blowing Smoke"; Produced for RCA Records	True to Self (2017)
Drake	"4422"; Produced for Young Money Entertainment, Cash Money Records, and Republic Records	More Life: A Playlist By October Firm (2017)
Big Sean	"No Favors" Produced for Def Jam Recordings and GOOD Music	I Decided. (2017)
Anders	"Diamonds" Produced for NST	669 (2017)
Little Simz	"King of Hearts"; Produced for Age 101 Music	Stillness in Wonderland (2017)
Cousin Stizz	"Up To Something" Produced for RCA/Sony	One Night Only (2017)
Anders	"The Wall" Produced for NST	(2017)
Lil Uzi Vert	"Feelings Mutual" Produced for Atlantic Recording	Luv is Rage 2 (2017)
Roy Woods	"Btown" Produced for OVO Sound	Say Less (2017)
Roy Woods	"BB" Produced for OVO Sound	Say Less (2017)
Roy Woods	"In The Club" Produced for OVO Sound	Say Less (2017)
Roy Woods	"Undivided" Produced for OVO Sound	Say Less (2017)
Julian Thomas	"Cold" Produced for Sony Canada	(2017)
Anders	"Attached" Produced for NST	(2017)
Anders	"Bad Guy" Produced for NST	Twos (2018)
Anders	"Take it Back" Produced for NST	Twos (2018)
Anders	"Why" Produced for NST	Twos (2018)
Rich The Kid	"Too Gone" Produced for Interscope Records	The World is Yours (2018)
Lykke Li	"Deep End" Produced for LL Recordings/RCA Records	still sad still sexy (2018)
Anders	"Problems" Produced for NST	(2018)
CMDWN	"Diamond Test" Produced for CMDWN/ eOne	Atlanda 2 (2018)
Killy	"Earned It" Produced for Secret Sound Club	Killstreak (2018)
The Parlor Mob	"Setting with the Sun" Produced for Britannia Row Recordings	(2018)
Jacob Banks	"Slow Up" Produced for Interscope Records	Village (2018)
Julian Thomas	"So Long" Produced for Sony Canada	I Can't Trust It (2018)
Julian Thomas	"Time on Their Hands" Produced for Sony Canada	I Can't Trust It (2018)
ZAYN	"Stand Still" Produced for RCA RECORDS	Icarus Falls (2018)
Pvrx	"Is U Down" (featuring Dave East) Produced for Def Jam Recordings	3.14 (2019)
Higher Brothers	"No More" Produced for Def Jam	Five Stars (2019)
FLETCHER	"If You're Gonna Lie" Produced for Snapback / UMG / Capitol	(2019)
Lykke Li	"Baby Doves" Produced for LL Recordings/RCA Records	so sad so sexy (2019)
Miraa May	"Work" Produced for Universal Music	Dark (2019)
Sean Leon	"Gold" Produced for The INITIATIVE	C.C.W.M.T.T. (2019)
Jordon Manswell	"Beat One"	Big Mouth (2019)
The Parlor Mob	"All I'm Holding Onto" Produced for	Dark Hour (2019)
Bibi Bourelly	"Wet" Produced for Def Jam	you ruined new york city for me (2019)
Luidji	"Millesime" Produced for Grand Musique Management	Toronto / Paris (Red Bull Music) (2019)
Anders	"Sticky Situation" Produced for NST	(2019)
FLETCHER	"All Love" Produced for Snapback / UMG / Capitol	you ruined new york city for me (2019)
The Parlor Mob	"No Harm" Produced for Britannia Row Recordings / BMG	Dark Hour (2019)
Skip Marley	"Higher Place" Produced for	Higher Place (2020)
