= Cheers to the Best Memories =

Studio album by Dvsn and Ty Dolla Sign
- Released: August 20, 2021
- Recorded: 2018–2021
- Genre: R&B
- Length: 32:18
- Labels: OVO; Warner
- Producers: Ty Dolla Sign; Coop the Truth; Damn James!; Daoud; Frank Dukes; G Ry; Jeff "Gitty" Gitelman; Jermaine Dupri; Mike Moore; Mike Woods; Murda Beatz; Nascent; Nineteen85; Noah "40" Shebib; Tee Romano

Dvsn chronology
A Muse in Her Feelings (2020)	Cheers to the Best Memories (2021)

Ty Dolla Sign chronology
Featuring Ty Dolla Sign (2020)	Cheers to the Best Memories (2021)	Vultures 1 (2024)

Singles from Cheers to the Best Memories
- 1. "I Believed It" Released: June 30, 2021; 2. "Memories" Released: August 18, 2021

Cheers to the Best Memories is a collaboration album by the Canadian duo Dvsn and American singer Ty Dolla Sign. It was released on August 20, 2021, by OVO Sound and Warner. The album includes guest appearances from the late Mac Miller, YG, and Rauw Alejandro.

== Singles and promotion ==
On June 30, 2021, Dvsn and Ty Dolla Sign announced the collaboration album releasing the first single "I Believed It" featuring Mac Miller. On August 18, 2021, they announced the release date and title of the album while releasing the second single "Memories".

== Track listing ==
Cheers to the Best Memories track listing
No.	Title	Writer(s)	Producer(s)	Length
1.	"Memories"	Daniel Daley; Tyrone Griffin Jr.; Paul Jefferies; Noah Shebib; Anthony Johnson; Keith Sweat; Roy Murray	Nineteen85; Noah "40" Shebib	2:45
2.	"Don't Say a Word"	Daley; Griffin; Jeffries; Shebib	Nineteen85; Shebib	3:31
3.	"Can You Take It" (interlude)	Daley; Griffin; Jeffries; Joe Reeves	Nineteen85; Reeves^{[c]}	1:49
4.	"Outside"	Daley; Griffin; Ryan Alexander Martinez	Daoud; G Ry; Tee Romano	3:09
5.	"Can't Tell" (featuring YG)	Daley; Griffin; Jefferies; Keenon Jackson; Alphonso Jordan; Demetrius Stewart; Lorenzo Jordan; T. Cook	Nineteen85	3:27
6.	"Somebody That You Don't Know" (featuring Rauw Alejandro)	Daley; Griffin; Jeffries; Jeff Gitelman; Raul Alexander; Shane Lindstrom	Jeff "Gitty" Gitelman; Jermaine Dupri; Murda Beatz; Nineteen85; Ty Dolla Sign	2:56
7.	"Fight Club"	Daley; Griffin; James Royo; Terius Gray	Ty Dolla Sign; Damn James!	2:19
8.	"Rude" (Ty Dolla Sign interlude)	Griffin; Christian Ward; Christopher Ruelas; Cooper McGill; Ivory Scott; Mike Woods	Coop the Truth; Woods; Nascent	1:38
9.	"Better Yet" (Dvsn interlude)	Daley; Jefferies; Adam Feeney	Frank Dukes; Nineteen85	2:34
10.	"Wedding Cake"	Daley; Griffin; Michael Faulkner	Mike Moore	4:07
11.	"I Believed It" (featuring Mac Miller)	Daley; Griffin; Jefferies; Malcolm McCormick; Allan Felder; Norman Harris	Nineteen85; Ty Dolla Sign^{[c]}	4:07
Total length:				32:18

Note

- ^{^[c]} indicates a co-producer

== Personnel ==
Musicians

- Daniel Daley – lead vocals (1–7, 9–12)
- Ty Dolla Sign – lead vocals (1–8, 10–12), keyboards, programming (7, 11)
- Noah "40" Shebib – keyboards, programming (1, 2)
- Nineteen85 – keyboards, programming (1–3, 5, 6, 9, 11)
- Mike Moore – piano, talk box (1); keyboards, programming (10)
- Johan Lenox – string arrangement (1, 11)
- Yasmeen Al-Mazeedi – violin (1, 10–11)
- Eric Kim – violin (1, 11)
- Joe Reeves – keyboards (3, 4), programming (3)
- G Ry – programming (4)
- Murda Beatz – keyboards, programming (6)
- Damn James! – keyboards, programming (7)
- Mike Woods – keyboards, programming (8)
- Nascent – keyboards, programming (8)
- Frank Dukes – keyboards, programming (9)
- Mac Miller – vocals (11)

Technical

- Chris Athens – mastering engineer
- Manny Marroquin – mixer (1–5, 7–11)
- Jaycen Joshua – mixer (6)
- Ty Dolla Sign – recording engineer (1, 3, 5–7, 10)
- James Royo – recording engineer (1, 3, 5–8, 10)
- Rafael "Fai" Bautista – recording engineer (2, 4–10)
- Patrik Plummer – recording engineer (5)
- Dave Huffman – assistant mastering engineer
- Harrison Holmes – assistant mastering engineer
- Anthony Vilchis – assistant mixer (1–5, 7–11)
- Trey Station – assistant mixer (1–5, 7–11)
- Zach Pereyra – assistant mixer (1–5, 7–11)
- Gabe Shaddow – assistant recording engineer (2, 4)
- Nate Graves – assistant recording engineer (2, 4)
- Piéce Eatah – assistant recording engineer (8)
- Jeff Crake – assistant engineer (3, 5–7, 10, 11)

== Charts ==
Chart performance for Cheers to the Best Memories
Chart (2021)	Peak position
US Billboard 200	139
