= Way 2 Sexy =

2021 single by Drake featuring Future and Young Thug

Single by Drake featuring Future and Young Thug

from the album Certified Lover Boy
- Released: September 3, 2021
- Recorded: 2020 – 2021
- Genre: Comedy rap; trap
- Length: 4:18
- Label: Republic; OVO
- Songwriters: Aubrey Graham; Nayvadius Wilburn; Jeffery Williams; Bryan Simmons; Lesidney Ragland; Fred Fairbrass; Richard Fairbrass; Robert Manzoli
- Producers: TM88; Too Dope

Drake singles chronology
"Over the Top" (2021)	"Way 2 Sexy" (2021)	"Girls Want Girls" (2021)

Future singles chronology
"Nobody Special" (2021)	"Way 2 Sexy" (2021)	"Too Easy" (2021)

Young Thug singles chronology
"Tick Tock" (2021)	"Way 2 Sexy" (2021)	"Potion" (2022)

Music video
- "Way 2 Sexy" on YouTube

"Way 2 Sexy" is a song by Canadian rapper Drake featuring American rappers Future and Young Thug. Released on September 3, 2021, as the lead single from Drake's sixth studio album Certified Lover Boy, released the same day, and it is a bass-heavy take on Right Said Fred's "I'm Too Sexy" (1991), which it samples throughout the chorus and refrain. A comedic music video was released on the same day as the song and sees the artists pay homage to numerous pop culture events and icons. "Way 2 Sexy" received mixed responses from critics.

The song began impacting US Top 40, rhythmic, and urban radio stations as the album's lead single simultaneously with Certified Lover Boy's release.

== Background ==
"Way 2 Sexy" was initially rumored to be released on August 27, 2021, to challenge Kanye West's Donda album; DJ Akademiks posted footage of the video shoot and claimed it would coincide with West's release, amid West and Drake's feud. Although that release failed to materialize, on September 13, 2021, Billboard magazine reported that the song had begun to impact US pop, rhythmic and R&B/hip-hop radio stations as the album's lead single.

Drake, Future, and Thug previously collaborated on Drake's "D4L" from his mixtape Dark Lane Demo Tapes (2020).

== Composition ==
A bass-heavy track, it samples British band Right Said Fred's 1991 single "I'm Too Sexy", a former number one Billboard hit. Future performs the chorus, reworking the sampled track's hook, rapping about how he is "too sexy for your girl, too sexy for the world, his fame, and his chain". Drake delivers lines about safe sex, and questions a "thotty" about her motives. Future's verse contains "toxic rhymes about ghosting women", with Thug closing the track, boasting about how he is able to spoil his girlfriend with expensive gifts. The song is in the key of E minor with a tempo of 136 BPM with a time signature of 4/4 in common time.

== Critical reception ==
HipHopDX called the track a stand-out from the album. Referencing the trio's previous collaboration, "D4L", Billboard's Heran Mamo said they "come back hotter than ever to flip Right Said Fred's 1991 Billboard Hot 100 No. 1 hit 'I'm Too Sexy'". GQ said it "has the most club banger energy" on Certified Lover Boy, but acknowledged that the song and its video received mixed reactions. Pitchfork's Matthew Strauss named it among the early standouts on Certified Lover Boy, pointing out how Drake "is having fun the way he did on his Scary Hours 2 EP and Smiley's "Over the Top". The A.V. Club's Nina Hernandez wrote positively: "besides sampling Right Said Fred to great effect, [the song] also succeeds by including well-deployed appearances from Young Thug and Future". Brandon Yu of Variety said "Way 2 Sexy" is "perhaps the album's most polarizing track: the beat is glorious and boisterous, while the core sample (Right Said Fred's 'I'm Too Sexy') and Future's chorus are immediately cringey, even as the naturally zanier Young Thug slides in with ease".

Noting Drake's refrain as "perfectly catchy and entirely ridiculous", Alexandra Pauly of Highsnobiety called the song "catchy yet cringe-y", and referencing the video, stated: "As funny as Drake's 'Way 2 Sexy' video is, there's something unsettling about a man in his mid-30s using his 'nice guy' image — which he never hesitates to milk — as a way to prop up his ego and sexual appeal". NME's Luke Morgan Britton wrote: "[...] even worse than the sample itself, and the purposely corny video, are the song's lyrics", further opining that "the usually-brilliant Young Thug serves up regrettable lines". Will Dukes of Rolling Stone labeled the song a "no-brainer anthem", writing that "despite a sticky Future hook, there's something that rings a bit hollow: Drake deliberately lags behind the track, sounding sluggish, rather than sui generis (as on 2017's triumphant 'Gyalchester')". NME's Rihan Daly said "It is, quite frankly, one of the worst songs of the year". Complex's Jessica McKinney said "'Way 2 Sexy' is intentionally corny and sleazy", countering that "sometimes that works for Drake, and those songs (and videos) go viral on social media, but I think he went a little too far this time. It comes off too gimmicky".

== Chart performance ==
On the week of September 18, 2021, "Way 2 Sexy" became the 56th song to debut at number one on the US Billboard Hot 100. The song became Drake's ninth number-one hit on the chart, as well as Future's first and Young Thug's third. With this release, Drake extended his record as the rapper with the most #1 songs in history, and Future broke the record for the longest wait to have a #1 hit, this being his 126th entry. During this week, Drake had singles from his album that held the entire top-five, matching The Beatles record of simultaneously occupying the top 5 slots on the Hot 100 chart dated April 4, 1964, with the only song not performed by Drake on the top-ten listing being "Stay" by The Kid Laroi and Justin Bieber, which was at #6 during the charting week. Furthermore, with Drake and Future's, What a Time to Be Alive previously topping the Billboard 200 on October 10, 2015, it was the first time where two individual acts, had shared a #1 single and album together.

== Music video ==
The video for "Way 2 Sexy" was released on the same day as the song and its parent album, directed by Dave Meyers, who also directed Drake's "Laugh Now Cry Later". Considered a "tongue-in-cheek" video, the visual opens with a faux warning from OVO that reads, "Repeat viewing may lead to pregnancy". Drake is seen alternating between various characters, starting by parodying Eric Prydz's Call on Me music video, as a masculine workout instructor in the form of Popeye, while also appearing on romance novel covers, walking shirtless on the beach in a fat suit, and portraying an action hero, as he shows off his "guns" in Drambo: Thirst Blood, a parody of Rambo: First Blood. In all-white attire, Drake, Future and Thug form a boyband, recreating the videos to Boyz II Men's "Water Runs Dry" and Backstreet Boys' "I Want It That Way", with a cameo from basketball player Kawhi Leonard. Drake also channels Michael Jackson's dance moves from 1991's "Black or White", Future wears a Prince outfit seen in Prince and the New Power Generation's 1992 video "Sexy M.F.", while Young Thug shows off his seasonal looks in a calendar photoshoot. Drake later interrupts the video for a fake black-and-white commercial announcing a new fragrance called "Wet by Drake". Uproxx's Aaron Williams summarized the video as "Drake lampoons pop culture's ideals of sex appeal through the decades".

== Charts ==
=== Weekly charts ===
Chart performance for "Way 2 Sexy"
Chart (2021–22)	Peak position
Australia (ARIA)	7
Australia Hip-Hop/R&B Singles (ARIA)	5
Austria (Ö3 Austria Top 40)	28
Canada Hot 100 (Billboard)	3
Canada CHR/Top 40 (Billboard)	35
Czech Republic Singles Digital (ČNS IFPI)	42
Denmark (Tracklisten)	16
France (SNEP)	28
Germany (GfK)	66
Global 200 (Billboard)	2
Greece (IFPI)	3
Hungary (Stream Top 40)	32
Iceland (Tónlistinn)	10
Ireland (IRMA)	15
Italy (FIMI)	57
Latvia (Latvijas Radio 5 Top 40)	35
Lithuania (AGATA)	15
Netherlands (Global Top 40)	4
Netherlands (Single Top 100)	60
New Zealand (Recorded Music NZ)	7
Norway (VG-lista)	18
Portugal (AFP)	14
Romania (Airplay 100)	63
Slovakia (Singles Digitál Top 100)	25
South Africa (TOSAC)	6
Sweden (Sverigetopplistan)	25
Switzerland (Schweizer Hitparade)	13
UK Singles (Official Charts)	11
UK Hip Hop/R&B (Official Charts)	5
US Billboard Hot 100	1
US Hot R&B/Hip-Hop Songs (Billboard)	1
US Pop Airplay (Billboard)	21
US Rhythmic Airplay (Billboard)	1

=== Year-end charts ===
2021 year-end chart performance for "Way 2 Sexy"
Chart (2021)	Position
Canada (Canadian Hot 100)	60
Global 200 (Billboard)	125
US Billboard Hot 100	48
US Hot R&B/Hip-Hop Songs (Billboard)	19
US Rhythmic (Billboard)	44

2022 year-end chart performance for "Way 2 Sexy"
Chart (2022)	Position
US Hot R&B/Hip-Hop Songs (Billboard)	21

== Certifications ==
Certifications for "Way 2 Sexy"
Region	Certification	Certified units/sales
Australia (ARIA)	Platinum	70,000^{‡}
Brazil (Pro-Música Brasil)	Platinum	40,000^{‡}
Denmark (IFPI Danmark)	Gold	45,000^{‡}
France (SNEP)	Gold	100,000^{‡}
Italy (FIMI)	Gold	50,000^{‡}
New Zealand (RMNZ)	Platinum	30,000^{‡}
Poland (ZPAV)	Gold	25,000^{‡}
Portugal (AFP)	Gold	5,000^{‡}
United Kingdom (BPI)	Gold	400,000^{‡}
Streaming
Greece (IFPI Greece)	Gold	1,000,000^{†}
^{‡} Sales+streaming figures based on certification alone.^{†} Streaming-only figures based on certification alone.

== See also ==
- List of Billboard Hot 100 number ones of 2021
