= Obsidian (Naomi Sharon album) =

Studio album by Naomi Sharon
- Released: 20 October 2023
- Length: 41:46
- Label: OVO; Santa Anna
- Producer: 40; Alex Lustig; Andre Harris; Beau Nox; David Gramz; Jack Ro; Nineteen85; Rampa

Naomi Sharon chronology
Obsidian (2023)	The Only Love We Know (2025)

Singles from Obsidian
- 1. "Hills" Released: 17 December 2021; 2. "Another Life" Released: 20 January 2023; 3. "Celestial" Released: 20 January 2023; 4. "Definition of Love" Released: 25 August 2023; 5. "Regardless" Released: 11 October 2023; 6. "Nothing Sweeter" Released: 18 January 2024

Obsidian is the debut studio album by Dutch singer Naomi Sharon, released on 20 October 2023 by OVO Sound and Santa Anna Label Group. The album was executive produced by Alex Lustig & Beau Nox; with production by 40, Alex Lustig, Andre Harris, Beau Nox, David Gramz, Jack Ro and Nineteen85. Obsidian spawned five singles: "Hills", "Another Life", "Celestial", "Definition of Love", and "Regardless".

== Background ==
Obsidian follows her signing to Drake's record label in early 2023 after she caught his attention from her second ever released single, "Breeze".

== Critical reception ==
A Book of Us lauded the album for its emotional depth and diverse range of influences. Further, they declare that the album transcends genres.

== Track listing ==
Track listing and credits adapted from Apple Music and Tidal.

Obsidian track listing
No.	Title	Writer(s)	Producer(s)	Length
1.	"Definition of Love"	Naomi Sharon; Alex Lustig; Christian Beau Anastasiou Astrop; Liz Rodrigues	Alex Lustig; Beau Nox	3:16
2.	"If This Is Love"	Sharon; Lustig; Astrop	Alex Lustig; Beau Nox^{[a]}	3:27
3.	"Another Life"	Sharon; Lustig; Astrop; David Friedrich; Gregor Sutterlin; Noah Shebib	Alex Lustig; Beau Nox; 40^{[a]}; Rampa^{[a]}	4:31
4.	"Myrrh"	Sharon; Astrop; David Gramz	Beau Nox; David Gramz	3:17
5.	"Celestial"	Sharon; Astrop; Shebib	40; Beau Nox^{[a]}	2:53
6.	"Time And Trust"	Sharon; Lustig; Astrop	Alex Lustig; Beau Nox	2:30
7.	"Push" (featuring Omah Lay)	Sharon; Lustig; Astrop; Paul Jefferies; Stanley Omah Didia	Alex Lustig; Beau Nox; Nineteen85	2:43
8.	"Holding In Place"	Sharon; Lustig; Astrop; Rodrigues	Alex Lustig; Beau Nox^{[a]}	3:36
9.	"Extacy"	Sharon; Lustig; Astrop	Beau Nox; Alex Lustig^{[a]}	4:12
10.	"Lucid Dreamer"	Sharon; Lustig; Astrop; Rodrigues	Alex Lustig	3:14
11.	"Regardless"	Sharon; Lustig; Astrop; Jack Rochon	Beau Nox; Jack Rochon; Alex Lustig^{[a]}	3:09
12.	"Outro (If This Is Love)" (featuring Beau Nox)	Sharon; Lustig; Astrop	Beau Nox	1:57
13.	"Hills"	Sharon; Andre Harris	Dre	3:01
Total length:				41:46

Obsidian (Extended) track listing
No.	Title	Writer(s)	Producer(s)	Length
14.	"Nothing Sweeter"	Sharon; Rodrigues; James Bryan	Bryan	4:26
15.	"Another Life" (Marten Lou Remix)	Sharon; Lustig; Astrop; Friedrich; Sutterlin; Shebib]]	Lustig; Nox; 40; Rampa; Lou	5:04
16.	"Goodbyes (Myrrh)" (with DJ Snake)	Sharon; Astrop; Gramz	Nox; Gramz; DJ Snake	5:04
Total length:				54:47

Notes

- ^{^a} signifies a co-producer

== Release history ==
Release dates and formats for Obsidian
Region	Date	Label(s)	Format(s)	Edition(s)	Ref.
Various	20 October 2023	Santa Anna; OVO Sound	Digital download; streaming	Standard	
Various	29 March 2024	Santa Anna; Sony Music	LP	Standard	
