= Exis (EP) =

EP by Roy Woods
- Released: July 31, 2015
- Recorded: 2015
- Genre: Hip hop; PBR&B
- Length: 22:49
- Label: OVO Sound; Warner Bros.
- Producer: CMPLX; Daniel Worthy; FrancisGotHeat; Prezident Jeff; The 90z

Roy Woods chronology
Exis (2015)	Waking at Dawn (2016)

Exis (stylized as EXIS) is the debut extended play by Canadian recording artist Roy Woods. It was released on July 31, 2015, by OVO Sound and Warner Bros. Records. The EP's sole guest appearance comes from Canadian rapper and label-mate Drake. The official cover of Exis contains a picture of a white sketched tree with a blue background (representing "night time") and also the yellow moon. The back cover reveals the track list on one side of the moon. The first music video to be put out from the album was for the song "Jealousy". The video was directed by creative artist Jim Joe. It has received over 9,100,000 views since its release. Music videos for "Get You Good" and "Go Go Go" were released as well, garnering over 9,400,000 and 1,800,000 views respectively.

== Track listing ==
No.	Title	Writer(s)	Producer(s)	Length
1.	"Innocence"	Denzel Spencer; Francis Nguyen-Tran	FrancisGotHeat	4:19
2.	"Go Go Go"	Spencer; Jeffrey Offe; Daniel Smith	Prezident Jeff; Daniel Worthy	4:05
3.	"Unleashed"	Spencer; Offe	Prezident Jeff	2:44
4.	"Get You Good"	Spencer; Gregory Stokes Jr.	The 90z	3:46
5.	"Drama" (featuring Drake)	Spencer; Tyree Erskin; Aubrey Graham	CMPLX	4:11
6.	"Jealousy"	Spencer; Nguyen-Tran	FrancisGotHeat	3:44
Total length:				22:49

== Charts ==
Chart (2015)	Peak position
US Top R&B/Hip-Hop Albums (Billboard)	27

== Release history ==
Region	Date	Format	Label
Worldwide	July 31, 2015	Digital download	OVO Sound; Warner Bros.
