= Over the Top (Smiley song) =

2021 single by Smiley featuring Drake

Single by Smiley featuring Drake
- Released: July 23, 2021
- Genre: Trap
- Length: 2:33
- Label: OVO; Warner
- Songwriters: Alexander Morand; Aubrey Graham; Brytavious Chambers
- Producer: Tay Keith

Smiley singles chronology
"Moving Different" (2021)	"Over the Top" (2021)

Drake singles chronology
"What's Next" (2021)	"Over the Top" (2021)	"Way 2 Sexy" (2021)

"Over the Top" is a song by Canadian rapper Smiley, featuring fellow Canadian rapper Drake. It was released on July 23, 2021, by OVO Sound and Warner Records and later appeared on Smiley's album Buy Or Bye 2. The duo had previously collaborated on Smiley's 2019 track "Organization" with Canadian rapper Booggz.

== Background ==
Drake has described Smiley as an "inspiration" for his Scorpion album and that he had also listened to Smiley's previous EP. This relationship leading back to 2014 led to the collaboration of "Over the Top". At the time the single was released, it was also announced that Drake had signed Smiley to his label OVO Sound, in conjunction with Warner Records. In a tweet, Smiley stated that Drake and him had originally recorded a different song, but it leaked online. In the song, the pair go verse for verse. Smiley's verse was noted for his "one of a kind flow" and his "cartoonish Snaggletooth wheeze" voice.

Production was handled by American record producer Tay Keith.

== Charts ==
Chart performance for "Over the Top"
Chart (2021)	Peak position
Canada Hot 100 (Billboard)	13
Global 200 (Billboard)	53
Ireland (IRMA)	73
New Zealand Hot Singles (RMNZ)	11
UK Singles (Official Charts)	97
US Billboard Hot 100	57
US Hot R&B/Hip-Hop Songs (Billboard)	19
US Rhythmic Airplay (Billboard)	22

== Certifications ==
Region	Certification	Certified units/sales
United States (RIAA)	Gold	500,000^{‡}
^{‡} Sales+streaming figures based on certification alone.
