= No Sleep in Paradise =

Studio album by Naomi Sharon
- Released: 26 June 2026
- Length: 55:44
- Labels: OVO; Santa Anna
- Producers: Beau Nox; Thom Bridges; Burns; Noel Cadastre; Govi; Kaytranada; Alex Lustig; Karl Rubin; Jordan Ullman

Naomi Sharon chronology
The Only Love We Know (2025)	No Sleep in Paradise (2026)

Singles from No Sleep in Paradise
- 1. "Bittersweet" Released: 9 May 2025; 2. "Miss That" Released: 26 February 2026; 3. "Better Days" Released: 8 May 2026; 4. "Weak" Released: 5 June 2026; 5. "Was It Ever Love" Released: 26 June 2026

No Sleep in Paradise is the second studio album by Dutch singer-songwriter Naomi Sharon. It was released by OVO Sound and Santa Anna Label Group on 26 June 2026.

== Tour ==
On 8 June, Sharon announced her concert tour, the No Sleep in Paradise Tour, in support of the album. Consisting of 19 dates across North America and Europe, the tour will begin on 10 September 2026, in San Francisco, California, and conclude on 6 November 2026 in Amsterdam, Netherlands.

== Track listing ==
No Sleep in Paradise track listing
No.	Title	Writer(s)	Producer(s)	Length
1.	"I Know"	Naomi Sharon; Alex Lustig	Lustig; Jordan Ullman	3:39
2.	"Miss That"	Sharon; Bianca Atterberry; Peter Cetera; Ullman	Ullman	2:56
3.	"Weak"	Sharon; Christian Astrop; Ullman	Beau Nox; Lustig; Ullman	3:29
4.	"Try"	Sharon; Atterberry; Louis Celestin; Ullman	Kaytranada; Ullman	3:06
5.	"If You Wanted to You Would"	Sharon; Atterberry; Lustig; Orion Meshorer; Karl Rubin; Ullman	Lustig; Rubin; Ullman	3:11
6.	"Bittersweet"	Sharon; Astrop; Thom Bridges	Beau Nox; Bridges	3:57
7.	"Starting Fires"	Sharon; Clementine Douglas; Ullman	Ullman	3:52
8.	"Was It Ever Love"	Sharon; Atterberry; Lustig; Ullman	Lustig; Ullman	3:14
9.	"Better Days"	Sharon; Atterberry; Lustig; Ullman	Lustig; Ullman	3:22
10.	"Celebrate"	Sharon; Matthew Burns; Nile Goveia; Lustig; John Mitchell; Ullman	Burns; Govi; Lustig; Ullman	3:34
11.	"Pink City"	Sharon; Noel Cadastre	Cadastre; Lustig; Ullman	2:48
12.	"Untitled"	Sharon; Ullman	Ullman	4:08
13.	"Half a Light"	Sharon; Lustig; Ullman	Lustig; Ullman	3:13
14.	"Leaving"	Sharon; Atterberry; Lustig; Ullman	Lustig; Ullman	3:40
15.	"Light My Soul"	Sharon; Atterberry; Lustig; Ullman	Lustig; Ullman	3:30
16.	"No Sleep in Paradise"	Sharon; Lustig	Lustig; Ullman	4:05
Total length:				55:44

== Personnel ==
Credits are adapted from Tidal.

- Naomi Sharon – lead vocals
- Jordan Ullman – keyboards (tracks 1–5, 7–15), programming (2–5, 7–16), engineering (2–5, 7, 9–12, 14, 15), mixing (2), piano (16)
- Bobby Campbell – surround mix engineering (1, 3–16)
- Jad "Oupsing" El Khoury – mixing (1, 3–5, 7–16), mastering (11)
- Dave Huffman – mastering (1, 3–5, 7–10, 12–16)
- Alex Lustig – keyboards (1, 3, 5, 8–11, 13–15), programming (3, 5, 8–11, 13–16), piano (16)
- Nathan Feler – engineering (1, 8, 13)
- James Bryan – guitar (1)
- Luca Pretolesi – mixing, mastering (2)
- Robert Guzman – surround mix engineering (2)
- Beau Nox – keyboards, programming (3, 6); engineering (6)
- Kaytranada – keyboards, programming (4)
- Karl Rubin – keyboards, programming (5)
- Thom Bridges – keyboards, programming, engineering (6)
- Thomas van Opstal – mixing (6)
- Chris Athens – mastering (6)
- Govi – keyboards (10)
- Burns – keyboards, programming (10)
- Noel Cadastre – keyboards, programming (11)
