= Morning After (album) =

Studio album by Dvsn
- Released: October 13, 2017
- Recorded: 2016–2017
- Genre: Alternative R&B
- Length: 51:28
- Labels: OVO; Warner Bros.
- Producers: Nineteen85 (exec.); 40; Alpha; Maneesh; Noël; Robin Hannibal

Dvsn chronology
Sept. 5th (2016)	Morning After (2017)	A Muse in Her Feelings (2020)

Singles from Morning After
- 1. "Think About Me" Released: May 5, 2017; 2. "Don't Choose" Released: July 23, 2017; 3. "Mood" Released: September 5, 2017; 4. "P.O.V." Released: October 5, 2017

Morning After is the second studio album by Canadian R&B duo Dvsn. It was released on October 13, 2017, by OVO Sound and Warner Bros. Records.

== Background ==
The lead single "Mood" was released on September 5, 2017, which they announced on Instagram. A teaser was revealed by dvsn on Instagram about the album on August 29, 2017. The official artwork was released in the form of a 'movie poster-like' image. In June 2017, they shared the song "Don't Choose", which was included as a single.

== Critical reception ==
Professional ratings
Aggregate scores
Source	Rating
Metacritic	74/100
Review scores
Source	Rating
AllMusic	3.5/5 stars
Exclaim!	7/10
Pitchfork	7.6/10

AllMusic's Andy Kellman wrote that the new producers don't stray the duo away from the "downcast style of slow jams and ballads" of Sept. 5th, but concluded that: "Compared to the debut, this has a little more definition." Yasin Rahman of Exclaim! praised Nineteen85's expansive "range of tempos and sound" and Daley's "vocal prowess" throughout the track listing but critiqued that more detailed lyricism than your typical R&B fare was needed, concluding that: "In general, dvsn have honed their skills since their debut, and it's resulted in a better-rounded and polished sound. With the cohesive and captivating Morning After, dvsn have used soothing vocals and layered beats to paint a sonic portrait of modern R&B." Pitchfork contributor Marcus J. Moore also praised both Daley's "delicate and powerful voice" and Nineteen85's "shadowy, cinematic" production for crafting a heartbreak album that captures the "essence of R&B pillars" like Maxwell's Urban Hang Suite and Frank Ocean's Channel Orange without utilizing either one for support. Kevin Ritchie of NOW felt that Daley was more of an "interesting, expressive singer than [he is] a lyricist", noting the track listing was more "straightforward and plaintive than poetic or analytical," and was mixed on Nineteen85's production throughout the record, praising the "catchiness and precision" of the melodies (highlighting the "mid-tempo R&B" in the middle section) but critiqued that the replacement of Sept. 5th's "female gospel singers" with acoustic instrumentation, "wandering and jazzy piano riffs, melodic guitar and classic soul/R&B nods" overemphasized the overall sentimentality.

== Track listing ==
Credits adapted from Tidal.

Morning After
No.	Title	Writer(s)	Producer(s)	Length
1.	"Run Away"	Daniel Daley; Paul Jefferies; James McMorrow	Nineteen85	2:20
2.	"Nuh Time / Tek Time"	Daley; Dalton Tennant; Paloma Ayana; Jefferies	Nineteen85	5:40
3.	"Keep Calm"	Aubrey Graham; Akeel Henry; Curtis Gadson; Daley; Jahron Brathwaite; Noah Shebib; Jefferies; Roz Newberry; Ron Sanders	Nineteen85; 40^{[a]}	4:44
4.	"Think About Me"	Daley; Jefferies	Nineteen85	4:06
5.	"Don't Choose"	Daley; Isaac Hayes; Jahron Brathwaite; Jefferies	Nineteen85	3:41
6.	"Mood"	Daley; Maneesh Bidaye; Jefferies	Maneesh; Nineteen85	3:35
7.	"P.O.V."	Daley; Jefferies; Adrian Eccleston; Robert Kelly	Nineteen85	3:36
8.	"You Do"	Daley; Jefferies; Noel Cadastre	Nineteen85; Noël	4:14
9.	"Morning After"	Daley; Joel Van Dijk; Jefferies; Paul Salva, Jr.; Robin Hannibal	Nineteen85; Hannibal	4:29
10.	"Can't Wait"	Carlos St John; Daley; Majid Al-Maskati; Bidaye; Jefferies	Maneesh; Nineteen85	3:13
11.	"Claim"	Brian Morgan; Daley; Mark McKay; Cadastre; Jefferies; Brandon Robertson	Nineteen85; Alpha^{[a]}; Noël^{[a]}	3:08
12.	"Body Smile"	Daley; Tennant; Shebib; Jefferies	Nineteen85; 40	4:39
13.	"Conversations in a Diner"	Daley; James Fauntleroy; Jonathan Hopkins; Kenny Anderson; Shebib; Jefferies	Nineteen85; 40	4:03
Total length:				51:28

Notes

- ^{^[a]} signifies a co-producer
- ^{^[b]} signifies an additional producer
- "P.O.V." is an abbreviation for 'Point Of View'
- "Run Away" and "Conversations in a Diner" features background vocals from Amoy Levy, Camille Harrison, Rahiem Hurlock, Renee Rowe and Shantel May Marquardt
- "Nuh Time / Tek Time" features additional vocals from Delilah and spoken vocals from Sabrina Brown
- "Keep Calm" features background vocals from Amoy Levy, Camille Harrison and Shantel May Marquardt
- "Don't Choose" features background vocals from Partynextdoor
- "Claim" features background vocals from Noël Cadastre and additional vocals from Brian Morgan

Sample credits

- "Keep Calm" contains a sample of "Slow Dance", written by Curtis Gadson, Roz Newberry and Ron Sanders and performed by David Ruffin
- "P.O.V." contains a sample of "Fortunate", written by Robert Kelly and performed by Maxwell

== Personnel ==
Credits adapted from Tidal.

Performers

- Dvsn – primary artist

Technical

- Greg Moffett – recording engineer (tracks 1, 4, 5 9), assistant mixing engineer (all tracks)
- David "DC" Garcia – recording engineer (tracks 1–8, 10–13)
- Chris Athens – mastering engineer (tracks 1, 2, 4–8, 10–13)
- Noel "Gadget" Campbell – mixing engineer (all tracks)
- Harley Arsenault – assistant mixing engineer (all tracks)
- Devon Brooks – recording engineer (tracks 3, 10)
- Kevin Dietz – recording engineer (track 4)
- Noah "40" Shebib – mixing engineer (track 5)
- David "Prep" Hughes – recording engineer (track 5)

Instruments

- Dalton 'D10' Tennant – keyboard (tracks 2, 12)
- Adrian X – solo guitar (track 7)

Production

- Nineteen85 – producer (all tracks)
- Maneesh – producer (tracks 6, 10)
- 40 – co-producer (track 3), producer (tracks 12, 13)
- Noël – producer (track 8), co-producer (track 11)
- Robin Hannibal – producer (track 9)
- Alpha – co-producer (track 11)

== Charts ==
Chart (2017)	Peak position
Belgian Albums (Ultratop Flanders)	154
Canadian Albums (Billboard)	19
Dutch Albums (Album Top 100)	163
New Zealand Heatseeker Albums (RMNZ)	4
US Billboard 200	38
US Top R&B/Hip-Hop Albums (Billboard)	22
