= Smiley (rapper) =

Canadian rapper from Toronto

- Also known as: Smiley_61st; Smiggy
- Born: Alexander Eli Morand; 1997 (age 28–29); Montreal, Quebec, Canada
- Origin: Toronto, Ontario, Canada
- Genres: Hip hop; trap
- Occupations: Rapper; songwriter
- Instruments: Vocals
- Years active: 2014–present
- Labels: OVO Sound; Warner

Alexander Eli Morand (born 1997), known professionally as Smiley (formerly Smiley_61st), is a Canadian rapper. He signed with hometown native Drake's record label OVO Sound, an imprint of Warner Records in 2021. In July of that year, he released the single "Over the Top" (featuring Drake), which peaked at number 13 on the Canadian Hot 100 and number 57 on the Billboard Hot 100.

== Career ==
Smiley began rapping in 2014 with rap crew Garden Gang after seeing his friends freestyling. In 2015, he released his track "9 on Me" which captured the attention of record producer Boi-1da. His track "Garden Girl" also helped him gain traction. He first interacted with Drake in 2017. In 2018 he released his debut mixtape Buy or Bye. Also in 2018, Drake cited Smiley's lyrics during his first public statement following the release of diss track The Story of Adidon by American rapper Pusha T. In July 2021, he released Over the Top, collaboration with Drake produced by American record producer Tay Keith. In November 2021, he released his debut album Buy or Bye 2, the sequel to his 2018 project with appearances from Yung Bleu, Duvy, Drake, Pressa and OhGeesy. Smiley is of Haitian and Mexican origin.

== Musical style ==
Jordan Darville, writing for The Fader, describes Smiley's style in the following manner: "Stark street bars rapped with a cadence that's light but fills the room with its presence, like a cloud of good weed."

== Discography ==
=== Studio albums ===
List of studio albums
	Album details	Peak chart positions	Certifications
Buy or Buy 2	Released: November 12, 2021; Label: OVO, Warner; Format(s): CD, digital download, streaming		

=== Mixtapes ===
List of mixtapes
	Release details
Buy.or.Bye	Released: March 7, 2018; Label: Buy or Bye Music Group; Format(s): Digital download, streaming
A Tape To Remember	Released: August 22, 2018; Label: Buy or Bye Music Group; Format(s): Digital download, streaming
Road to Buy or Bye 2 (The Playlist)	Released: July 12, 2019; Label: Buy or Bye Music Group; Format(s): Digital download, streaming
YYZ-LAX	Released: May 29, 2020; Label: OVO; Format(s): Digital download, streaming
Don't Box Me In	Released: June 13, 2025; Label: OVO; Format(s): Digital download, streaming

== Legal issues ==
In 2015, Smiley was in jail for a gun-related charge.
