= Naomi Sharon =

Dutch singer-songwriter

- Sharon in 2025
- Born: 4 March 1995 (age 31); Rotterdam, Netherlands
- Education: Academy of Theatre and Dance
- Occupations: Singer; songwriter
- Years active: 2019–present
- Musical career
- Genres: R&B; neo soul; downtempo; sophisti-pop
- Instrument: Vocals
- Label: OVO Sound
- Website: naomisharonmusic.com

Naomi Sharon Webster (born 4 March 1995) is a Dutch singer-songwriter. In early 2023, Sharon became the first female signee to Drake's record label, OVO Sound. Her debut album, Obsidian, was released later that year in October, being lauded by critics for its emotional depth and diverse range of influences.

== Early life ==
Naomi Sharon Webster was born to an Aruban father and a Dutch mother in Rotterdam, Netherlands. In interviews, Sharon has stated she grew up in a musical family, with her father working as a DJ and producer, and her mother as a singer. She formed her artistic sound around a variety of musicians she admired in her youth, including Sade, Eva Cassidy, Marcus Miller, Stevie Wonder and Sting. She attended the Academy of Theatre and Dance. Upon leaving in the third year, Sharon would perform in musical theater, appearing in The Lion King and Dream Girls. During the early 2010s, she would do cover songs. Sharon also participated in the sixth season of The Voice of Holland in 2016.

== Career ==
=== 2019–present ===
Sharon released her debut single, "The Moon" in 2019. That same year, she gave a TED Talk for TEDxAmsterdamWomen about self-love, where she performed the song. Her second single, "Breeze" caught the attention of Drake, who signed her to his OVO Sound record label in 2023, making her the first female act on its roster. She released two singles entitled "Definition of Love" and "Hills" in anticipation of her debut album, Obsidian. The 12-track album was released on 20 October 2023 to moderate critical success. Steven Ward of Grimy Goods described the project as, "an immense emotional gravitas, created to tap into or articulate the mercurial realms that exist inside of you." Sharon went on to perform in her debut tour, Obsidian Tour, with three dates in North America and four in Europe. She released a single, "Nothing Sweeter" on 18 January 2024.

== Artistry ==
=== Musical style ===
Sharon's sound has been described as, "genre-defying." Her songs have been noted to fuse alternative R&B and ambient house as well as including foreign influences from Afrobeats and Spanish music. Sharon's songs mainly deal with themes of love, heartbreak, and healing. Her low register vocals have been described as reminiscent to Sade's.

== Personal life ==
Sharon has a home in Rotterdam.

In 2021, Sharon broke off her engagement and eight-year relationship with ex-fiancé Jamie Sun, who alleged on Instagram that Sharon was having an affair with Drake.

== Discography ==
=== Studio albums ===
Title	Details
Obsidian	Released: 20 October 2023; Label: OVO, Santa Anna; Format: streaming, digital download, CD, LP
No Sleep in Paradise	Released: 26 June 2026; Label: OVO, Santa Anna; Format: streaming, digital download, CD, LP

=== Extended plays ===
Title	Details
The Only Love We Know	Released: 9 May 2025; Label: OVO, Santa Anna; Format: streaming, digital download

=== Singles ===
Title	Year	Peak chart positions	Album
Title	Year	CAN	Album
"The Moon"	2019	—	Non-album singles
"Breeze"	2019	—	Non-album singles
"Deeper" (with Full Crate)	2019	—	Non-album singles
"1991"	2020	—	Non-album singles
"Daughter of the Sun"	2020	—	Non-album singles
"Hills"	2021	—	Obsidian
"Another Life"	2023	—	Obsidian
"Celestial"	2023	—	Obsidian
"Definition of Love"	2023	—	Obsidian
"Regardless"	2023	—	Obsidian
"Nothing Sweeter"	2024	—	Obsidian
"Can We Do This Over"	2025	—	The Only Love We Know
"The Only Love We Know"	2025	—	The Only Love We Know
"Bittersweet"	2025	—	The Only Love We Know and No Sleep in Paradise
"Miss That"	2026	—	No Sleep in Paradise
"Better Days"	2026	—	No Sleep in Paradise
"Weak"	2026	—	No Sleep in Paradise
"Was It Ever Love"	2026	63	No Sleep in Paradise

== Tours ==
Supporting

- Born in the Wild Tour by Tems
- Ma Vie Tour by Doja Cat (Europe leg)
