= Sept. 5th =

2016 studio album by Dvsn

Studio album by Dvsn
- Released: March 27, 2016
- Genre: Alternative R&B
- Length: 46:40
- Label: OVO Sound; Warner Bros.
- Producer: Nineteen85; Noël Cadastre; Stephen Kozmeniuk

Dvsn chronology
Sept. 5th (2016)	Morning After (2017)

Singles from Sept. 5th
- 1. "The Line" Released: September 5, 2015; 2. "With Me" Released: September 5, 2015; 3. "Too Deep" Released: December 2, 2015; 4. "Hallucinations" Released: December 24, 2015

Sept. 5th (stylized in all caps) is the debut studio album by Canadian R&B duo Dvsn, released on March 27, 2016, by OVO Sound and Warner Bros. Records. The album's production was handled primarily by Nineteen85, assisted by Noël Cadastre and Stephen Kozmeniuk.

The album received positive reviews and was listed in some best-of-the-year year-end lists, including that by Spin magazine.

== Singles ==
On September 5, 2015, the two singles "The Line" and "With Me" were released. Both tracks' production were handled and provided by Nineteen85.

On December 2, 2015, the album's third single, "Too Deep", was released. The production on this track was handled and provided also by Nineteen85.

On December 24, 2015, the album's fourth single, "Hallucinations", the production of which was handled and provided by Nineteen85 and Stephen Kozmeniuk, was released.

== Reception ==
Professional ratings
Aggregate scores
Source	Rating
Metacritic	71/100
Review scores
Source	Rating
AllMusic	3/5 stars
Exclaim!	9/10
Pitchfork	8.3/10
PopMatters	8/10 stars

Upon release, SEPT. 5TH received positive reviews from music critics.

Spin magazine placed the album at #34 in its best albums of the year year-end list.

== Track listing ==
No.	Title	Writer(s)	Producer(s)	Length
1.	"With Me"	Daniel Daley; Paul Jefferies; Adam Feeney	Nineteen85	6:59
2.	"Too Deep"	Daley; Jefferies; Maneesh Bidaye; Benjamin Bush; Stephen Garrett; Majid Al Maskati; Timothy Mosley	Nineteen85	3:20
3.	"Try / Effortless"	Daley; Jefferies; Noël Cadastre; Stephen Kozmeniuk; Dan Talevski	Nineteen85; Noël Cadastre^{[a]}; Stephen Kozmeniuk^{[a]}	5:33
4.	"Do It Well"	Daley; Jefferies	Nineteen85	4:11
5.	"In + Out"	Daley; Jefferies	Nineteen85	3:46
6.	"Sept. 5th"	Daley; Jefferies	Nineteen85	3:56
7.	"Hallucinations"	Daley; Jefferies; Kozmeniuk	Nineteen85; Kozmeniuk	4:06
8.	"Another One"	Daley; Jefferies; Feeney; Gabriel Gagnon; Beauline Lafond; Camile Poliquin	Nineteen85	3:49
9.	"Angela"	Daley; Jefferies; Cadastre; Kozmeniuk; Talevski	Nineteen85	3:49
10.	"The Line"	Daley; Jefferies; Brett Kruger	Nineteen85	7:11
Total length:				46:40

Notes

- ^{^a} signifies a co-producer.
- "Too Deep" features additional vocals by Amoy Levy, Camille Harrison and Shantel May Marquardt.
- "In + Out" features additional vocals by August Rigo and Victoria Sheahan.
- "Sept. 5th" features additional vocals by Shantel May Marquardt.
- "Another One" features background vocals by Shantel May Marquardt and Rahiem Hurlock.
- "Angela" features additional vocals by James Vincent McMorrow, and a sample of Angeles by Elliott Smith.

== Personnel ==
Credits for Sept. 5th adapted from AllMusic.

- Harley Arsenault – mixing engineer
- Chris Athens – mastering
- Les Bateman – mixing engineer
- Noël Cadastre – mixing, producer, recording
- Noel "Gadget" Campbell – mixing
- Leonardo Delapena – guitar
- Dvsn – primary artist, vocals
- Camille Harrison – additional vocals
- Dave Huffman – engineer
- Rahiem Hurlock – background vocals
- Paul Jefferies – mixing
- Stephen Kozmeniuk – producer
- Amoy Levy – additional vocals
- Shantel May Marquardt – additional vocals, background vocals
- James Vincent McMorrow – additional vocals
- Greg Moffett – mixing engineer
- Nineteen85 – producer
- August Rigo – additional vocals
- Travis Sewchan – recording
- Victoria Sheahan – additional vocals
- Noah Shebib – mixing

== Charts ==
Chart (2016)	Peak position
Canadian Albums (Billboard)	69
UK R&B Albums (OCC)	25
US Billboard 200	133
US Top R&B/Hip-Hop Albums (Billboard)	17

== Release history ==
Region	Date	Format	Label	Ref.
Worldwide	March 27, 2016	Digital download	OVO Sound; Warner Bros.	
