= Noah Beresin =

American music producer

- Born: Philadelphia, U.S.
- Other names: Xaphoon Jones; Noah Breakfast
- Occupation: Musician / Producer
- Years active: 2008-present

Noah Beresin is an American music producer from Philadelphia.

Beresin co-created the alternative hip-hop project Chiddy Bang, and then departed the project in 2012. The group's early work was known for its sampling of contemporary pop and alternative music.

== Early life ==
Noah Beresin was born in Philadelphia, Pennsylvania.

As a child, Beresin was trained in piano, and he attended a children's music education program held at the Philadelphia Clef Club. He began working as a recording engineer & DJ while in high school. Later, Beresin briefly attended Drexel University.

== Music career ==
=== Chiddy Bang ===
In late 2008, Beresin formed a music project called Chiddy Bang with Chidera Anamege. Beresin, working under the stage name Xaphoon Jones, was responsible for the production. He produced free, downloadable mixtapes for the group in 2009, and then opted to drop out of university.

In 2011, the group signed to Parlophone Records and released 1 EP, followed by 1 album in 2012. After its release, Beresin departed the group to focus on songwriting and production for other artists.

=== Production work ===
In 2012, Beresin and mixing engineer Ryan Schwabe co-founded Rare MP3s, a Philadelphia based mixing and mastering company that would later become a club night & record label. Their first works included a Baauer remix of Disclosure’s “You & Me” and Ellie Goulding’s cover of Alt-J’s “Tessellate”, the latter of which was included on Halcyon Days as a bonus track.

In 2013, he produced songs for Ellie Goulding, Wiley, Big Boi, and the debut EP for the American indie-pop band Wet.

From 2015 onward, Beresin produced music for a diverse range of artists like Santigold, Christine & The Queens, Spank Rock, Tei Shi & Blood Orange, Ty Dolla $ign, Tobi Lou, Tory Lanez, Carly Rae Jepsen, Broods, Khalid, DVSN, and EricDOA.

In 2016, Pitchfork called him "an increasingly important behind-the-scenes force" in a review of the debut project from rapper Tunji Ige, citing his work with Jeremih as well as electronic producer Baauer.

As a session musician, he's played on recordings for bands like Hop Along, as well as artists such as Pink $weats.

In 2023, Beresin produced the debut album for the New Zealand indie rock project Georgia Gets By, released via the labels Fat Possum/Luminelle.

As a co-writer of the song 'Alone With You' by Kito & Aluna, which was sampled by Skrillex for the song 'Inhale / Exhale', Beresin earned his first Grammy nomination for the album Quest For Fire.

== Discography ==
| Track name | Artist Name(s) | Release year |
|---|---|---|
| ‍crisis actor | ericdoa | 2024 |
| QQ (Quédate Queriéndome) | Tei Shi | 2024 |
| Mindreader | Glassface & Odunsi The Engine | 2024 |
| Easier To Run | Georgia Gets By | 2023 |
| Fish Bird Baby Boy | Georgia Gets By | 2023 |
| Happiness Is An 8 Ball | Georgia Gets By | 2023 |
| Oh Lana | Georgia Gets By | 2023 |
| So Free So Lonely | Georgia Gets By | 2023 |
| Inhale Exhale | Skrillex, Aluna & Kito | 2023 |
| Mona Lisa | Tei Shi | 2023 |
| Numbers (Solo Version) | tobi lou & FARADA | 2023 |
| Alien | BROODS | 2022 |
| Gaslight | BROODS | 2022 |
| Like A Woman | BROODS | 2022 |
| Bad Premonition | Tei Shi | 2022 |
| Utilize Me | Tunji Ige | 2022 |
| Far Cry (Noah Breakfast Remix) | Wet | 2022 |
| Recap | Kito, VanJess & Channel Tres | 2021 |
| Simulation (feat. Swamp Dogg, Justin Vernon) [Noah Breakfast remix] | Naeem, Swamp Dogg, Justin Vernon | 2021 |
| Bad Jawn | Theodore Grams | 2021 |
| Off Guard | Aluna | 2021 |
| Heartbeat | Carly Rae Jepsen | 2021 |
| Dangerous City | DVSN & Ty Dolla $ign | 2021 |
| I'd Rather Go To Bed | G Flip | 2021 |
| Alone With You | Kito & Aluna | 2021 |
| Not Alright | Pink Sweat$ | 2021 |
| Lows | Pink Sweat$ | 2020 |
| The Sound | Carly Rae Jepsen | 2019 |
| 100 Thoughts | SL | 2019 |
| Gigantalous | SL | 2019 |
| Matando | Tei Shi | 2019 |
| Red Light | Tei Shi | 2019 |
| Even If It Hurts (feat. Blood Orange) | Tei Shi, Blood Orange | 2019 |
| Deserve It | tobi lou | 2019 |
| I Was Sad Last Night I'm OK Now | tobi lou | 2019 |
| Looped Up | tobi lou | 2019 |
| Sometimes I Ignore You Too | tobi lou | 2019 |
| Floating (feat. Khalid) | Alina Baraz, Khalid | 2018 |
| Church | Baauer | 2018 |
| Somewhere a Judge | Hop Along | 2018 |
| Pink Honey | Houses | 2018 |
| Undo | RL Grime | 2018 |
| High Score | tobi lou & Galimatias | 2018 |
| 11 Hours | Wet | 2018 |
| There’s a Reason | Wet | 2018 |
| Visitor | Wet | 2018 |
| Keep Running | Tei Shi | 2017 |
| New Phone (Who Dis) | Cakes da Killa | 2016 |
| Talkin’ Greezy | Cakes da Killa | 2016 |
| Light It Up | Big Sean & 2 Chainz, Kevin Hart | 2016 |
| Run the Races | Santigold | 2016 |
| Walking in a Circle | Santigold | 2016 |
| State of Mind | Tkay Maidza | 2016 |
| Guns and Roses | Tory Lanez | 2016 |
| Loners Blvd | Tory Lanez | 2016 |
| Black James Bond | Tunji Ige | 2016 |
| Fired Up | Tunji Ige | 2016 |
| On My Grind | Tunji Ige | 2016 |
| Don't Do Too Much ft. iLoveMakonnen | Tunji Ige | 2016 |
| Deadwater | Wet | 2016 |
| Island | Wet | 2016 |
| Move Me | Wet | 2016 |
| No Harm Is Done | Christine and the Queens, Tunji Ige | 2015 |
| Doctor’s In | Son Little | 2015 |
| Karrueche | Tory Lanez | 2015 |
| Sitting Pretty (feat. Wiz Khalifa) | Ty Dolla $ign, Wiz Khalifa | 2015 |
| A Week Straight | Tory Lanez | 2014 |
| Gold | Tory Lanez | 2014 |
| Henny in Hand | Tory Lanez | 2014 |
| I-95 | Tory Lanez | 2014 |
| The Mission | Tory Lanez | 2014 |
| Toyota Music | Big Sean | 2013 |
| Tessellate | Ellie Goulding | 2013 |
| Don’t Wanna Be Your Girl | Wet | 2013 |
| Dreams | Wet | 2013 |
| No Lie | Wet | 2013 |
| You’re the Best | Wet | 2013 |
| First Class | Wiley | 2013 |
| Shoes For Running | Big Boi | 2012 |
