= Dvsn =

Canadian R&B duo

dvsn
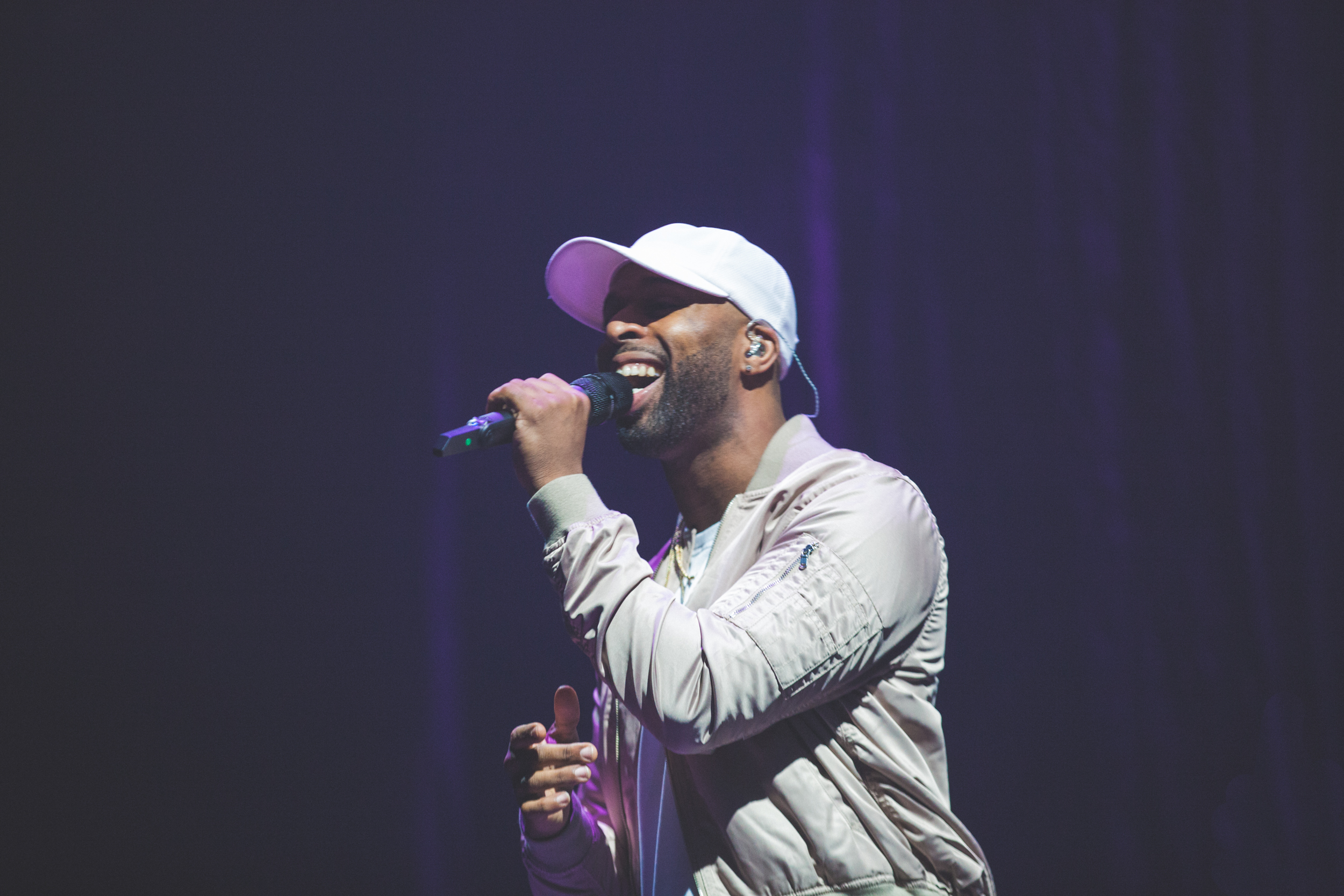
- Daniel Daley (2016)

Background information
- Origin: Toronto, Canada
- Genre: Alternative R&B
- Years active: 2015–present
- Labels: So So Def; HYBE America; OVO; Warner (former)
- Members: Daniel Daley; Nineteen85

Dvsn (stylized as dvsn and pronounced "division") is a Canadian R&B duo composed of singer Daniel Daley and producer Nineteen85. After releasing three songs in 2015, the duo signed with Canadian rapper Drake through his label OVO Sound. They released their debut studio album Sept. 5th to positive reviews that same year. Their second album, Morning After (2017), continued their critical success. They released their third album A Muse in Her Feelings (2020) and followed that up with the collaborative album Cheers to the Best Memories (2021) with Ty Dolla Sign. The duo's fourth studio album, Working on My Karma, was released on October 22, 2022.

== History ==
=== 2015–2016: Sept. 5th ===
On September 5, 2015, dvsn released two songs, titled "The Line" and "With Me". They initially started gaining recognition when "With Me" was played on Apple's Beats 1 radio during the seventh OVO Sound radio show. On December 2, 2015, they released their third song, titled "Too Deep" on SoundCloud and the iTunes Store. In March 2016, they released their fourth song, titled "Hallucinations" on SoundCloud and the iTunes Store. On February 29, 2016, it was announced that dvsn had signed to Drake's OVO Sound record label.

On March 11, 2016, dvsn announced the release date of their debut studio album, titled Sept. 5th, along with the album being made available for pre-order on the iTunes Store. They released the album exclusively on the iTunes Store and Apple Music on March 27, 2016, with the album releasing elsewhere on April 1, 2016. Sept. 5 was ranked number 34 on Spin's list of The 50 Best Albums of 2016.

Dvsn made a guest appearance on Drake's fourth studio album, Views on the track titled "Faithful".

=== 2017–2019: Morning After ===
On May 5, 2017, dvsn released "Think About Me" as the lead single from their second album. On June 23, "Don't Choose" was released as the second single. On August 1, dvsn announced that Morning After would be the title of their next album. A new single, titled "Mood" was released on September 4. Two days later, dvsn revealed that the album will be released on October 13. Morning After was made available for preorder on September 22.

On April 12, 2019, dvsn made their first appearance at Coachella. The duo performed again on April 19, 2019, for the Weekend 2 of Coachella.

=== 2019–2021: A Muse in Her Feelings and Cheers to the Best Memories ===
On July 10, 2019, dvsn released two singles, "Miss Me?" and "In Between". On October 30, 2019, they released "No Cryin" featuring Future. They followed up this release by releasing "A Muse" and "Between Us" featuring Snoh Aalegra. On April 10, 2020, they released "Dangerous City" featuring Ty Dolla Sign and Buju Banton. dvsn released their third studio album, A Muse In Her Feelings, on April 17, 2020, via OVO Sound, to positive reviews. The album was recognized on Rated R&B's 30 Best R&B Albums of 2020 list at number eight. The album debuted at number 23 on the Billboard 200 and number five on the Billboard Top R&B Albums. On January 15, 2021, dvsn released a deluxe edition of the album titled Amusing Her Feelings. It featured four new tracks, including a collaboration with R&B singer Miguel on "He Said" and 2010 Kings of Leon Song of the year "Use Somebody".

On August 20, 2021, dvsn released a collaboration album with Ty Dolla Sign titled Cheers to the Best Memories. It was preceded by two singles, "I Believed It" featuring Mac Miller on July 1, 2021, and "Memories" on August 18, 2021.

In June 2025, it was announced the duo left OVO Sound and Warner Records and signed with Jermaine Dupri's So So Def Recordings.

== Discography ==
=== Studio albums ===
Studio albums, with selected chart positions
Title	Album details	Peak chart positions				
Title	Album details	CAN	UK R&B	US	US R&B /HH	US R&B
Sept. 5th	Released: March 27, 2016; Label: OVO Sound, Warner Bros.; Formats: CD, LP, digital download	69	25	133	17	7
Morning After	Released: October 13, 2017; Label: OVO Sound, Warner Bros.; Formats: CD, LP, digital download	19	30	38	22	6
A Muse in Her Feelings	Released: April 17, 2020; Label: OVO Sound, Warner; Formats: CD, LP, digital download	13	17	23	13	5
Working on My Karma	Released: October 22, 2022; Label: OVO Sound, Warner; Formats: CD, LP, digital download	—	—	—	—	—

=== Collaborative albums ===
Collaborative studio albums, with selected chart positions
Title	Album details	Peak chart positions	
Title	Album details	US	US R&B
Cheers to the Best Memories (with Ty Dolla Sign)	Released: August 20, 2021; Label: OVO Sound, Warner; Format: Digital download, streaming	139	15

=== Singles ===
List of singles as lead artist, with certifications, year released and album name
Title	Year	Certifications	Album
"The Line"	2015		Sept. 5
"With Me"	2015	RIAA: Gold	Sept. 5
"Too Deep"	2015	RIAA: Gold	Sept. 5
"Hallucinations"	2015	RIAA: Gold	Sept. 5
"Think About Me"	2017	RIAA: Gold	Morning After
"Don't Choose"	2017		Morning After
"Mood"	2017		Morning After
"P.O.V"	2017		Morning After
"Miss Me?"	2019		A Muse in Her Feelings
"In Between"	2019		Non-album single
"No Cryin" (featuring Future)	2019		A Muse in Her Feelings
"A Muse"	2020		A Muse in Her Feelings
"Between Us" (featuring Snoh Aalegra)	2020		A Muse in Her Feelings
"Dangerous City" (featuring Ty Dolla Sign and Buju Banton)	2020		A Muse in Her Feelings
"Blessings"	2020		A Muse in Her Feelings
"Use Somebody"	2021		A Muse in Her Feelings
"I Believed It" (with Ty Dolla Sign featuring Mac Miller)	2021		Cheers to the Best Memories
"Memories" (with Ty Dolla Sign)	2021		Cheers to the Best Memories
"If I Get Caught"	2022		Working on My Karma
"What's Up" (featuring Jagged Edge)	2022		Working on My Karma
"Don't Take Your Love"	2022		Working on My Karma

=== Guest appearances ===
List of singles as featured artist
Title	Year	Other artist(s)	Album
"My Imagination"	2017	Majid Jordan	The Space Between
"Balance"	2017	Roy Woods, PnB Rock	Say Less

Non-single guest appearances, with selected chart positions
Title	Year	Peak chart positions					Album
Title	Year	CAN	UK	US	US R&B /HH	US Rap	Album
"Faithful" (Drake featuring Pimp C and Dvsn)	2016	61	108	72	36	19	Views

=== Music videos ===
List of music videos, with directors, showing year released
Title	Year	Director(s)
"With Me/Do It Well"	2016	Jon Riera & LeSean Harris
"Too Deep"	2017	Rohan Blair-Mangat
"Hallucinations"	2017	LeSean Harris
"Mood"	2017	LeSean Harris
"Morning After"	2018	Santiago Salviche
"No Cryin"	2019	Unknown
"A Muse"	2020	Andrew Hamilton
"Between Us"	2020	Brendan Vaughan
"Memories"	2021	Unknown

== Tours ==
Headlining

- Debut Tour (2016)
- Morning After (2018)
- Working on My Karma (2023)

Supporting

- Summer Sixteen Tour (with Drake & Future) (2016)
- Boy Meets World Tour (with Drake) (2017)
