= Waking at Dawn =

Studio album by Roy Woods
- Released: July 1, 2016
- Recorded: 2016
- Genres: Hip hop; Alternative R&B
- Length: 35:56
- Labels: OVO Sound; Warner Bros.
- Producers: Akeel Henry; DZL; FrancisGotHeat; Krs.; L.A. Chase; Murda Beatz; Omari Jabari; Prezident Jeff; Saintfall; Sunny Diamonds

Roy Woods chronology
Exis (2015)	Waking at Dawn (2016)	Nocturnal (2016)

Singles from Waking at Dawn
- 1. "Gwan Big Up Urself" Released: June 4, 2016; 2. "How I Feel" Released: June 4, 2016

Waking at Dawn is the debut studio album by Canadian recording artist Roy Woods. It was released on July 1, 2016, by OVO Sound and Warner Bros. Records. The album serves as a follow-up to his debut EP Exis (2015). It was preceded by two singles; "Gwan Big Up Urself" and "How I Feel".

== Background ==
On March 11, 2016, Roy Woods announced the album's title via Twitter. The release date and cover art was revealed on June 29, 2016.

== Singles ==
The album's lead single and second single, "Gwan Big Up Urself" and "How I Feel" was released on June 4, 2016.

== Critical reception ==
Professional ratings
Review scores
Source	Rating
HotNewHipHop	(74/100)
Now	3/5 stars
Exclaim!	6/10

Waking at Dawn was met with generally positive reviews. The album received a 74 out of 100 by HotNewHipHop. Writing for Exclaim!, Themistoklis Alexis praised the album's "flashes of maturity" but criticized Woods' "failure to emote fully on phonics."

== Track listing ==
Credits were adapted from Tidal.

No.	Title	Writer(s)	Producer(s)	Length
1.	"Sonic Boom"	Denzel Spencer; Francis Nguyen-Tran; Jeffrey Offe; Sunny Khokar	FrancisGotHeat; Prezident Jeff; Sunny Diamonds	3:04
2.	"You Love It"	Spencer; Antonio Mendes; Khokar	L.A. Chase; Sunny Diamonds	3:06
3.	"Gwan Big Up Urself"	Spencer; Christopher Allen; Nguyen-Tran; Khokar	Krs.; FrancisGotHeat; Sunny Diamonds	3:20
4.	"How I Feel"	Spencer; Lobban; Holmes; Khokhar	DZL; ALO	3:43
5.	"Down Girl"	Spencer; Offe; Khokar	Prezident Jeff; Sunny Diamonds	2:49
6.	"Switch"	Spencer; Nguyen-Tran; Shane Lindstrom; Khokar	FrancisGotHeat; Murda Beatz; Sunny Diamonds	3:21
7.	"Got Me"	Spencer; Holmes; Akeel Henry; Khokar	DZL; Akeel	3:38
8.	"Why"	Spencer; Lindstrom	Murda Beatz	4:22
9.	"Menace"	Spencer; Omari Jabari; Rashad Hussein; Khokar	Jabari; akaRashad; Sunny Diamonds	4:53
10.	"She Knows About Me"	Spencer; Nguyen-Tran; Khokar	FrancisGotHeat; Sunny Diamonds	3:40
Total length:				35:56

== Personnel ==
Credits adapted from Tidal.

Performers

- Roy Woods – primary artist

Technical

- Sunny Diamonds – recording engineer (all tracks), mixing engineer (all tracks)
- Chris Athens – mastering engineer (all tracks)

Production

- FrancisGotHeat – producer (tracks 1, 3, 6, 10)
- Prezident Jeff – producer (tracks 1, 5)
- Sunny Diamonds – producer (tracks 1–3, 5, 6, 9, 10)
- L.A. Chase – producer (track 2)
- Krs. – producer (track 3)
- DZL – producer (tracks 4, 7)
- ALO – producer (track 4)
- Murda Beatz – producer (tracks 6, 8)
- Akeel Henry – producer (track 7)
- Omari Jabari – producer (track 9)
- Saintfall – producer (track 9)

== Charts ==
Chart (2016)	Peak position
Canadian Albums (Billboard)	30
US Billboard 200	127
US Top R&B/Hip-Hop Albums (Billboard)	11

== Release history ==
Region	Date	Format	Label	Ref.
Worldwide	July 1, 2016	Digital download	OVO Sound; Warner Bros.	
