= Oliver El-Khatib =

Canadian producer and founder of OVO Sound

- Born: October 1, 1982 (age 43); Ontario, Canada
- Occupations: Producer, manager, entrepreneur
- Label: OVO Sound

Oliver El-Khatib (born October 1, 1982) is a Canadian producer, manager and entrepreneur. He is the founder of the October's Very Own (OVO) and manager of Drake.

== Early life ==
Oliver El-Khatib is of Canadian, Lebanese, and Nordic heritage, whose grandparents hail from Canada, Lebanon, Finland, and Iceland. El-Khatib grew up between Toronto and London. He attended high school with OVO co-founder and Drake's long-time friend and producer Noah James Shebib, better known as 40, whom he met in grade nine homeroom.

As a teen, El-Khatib found creative inspiration in skateboarding culture, visiting local record stores, including Toronto's Play De Record, studying album notes and tuning into Toronto's 88.1FM on Saturday mornings to hear new music. In his later teen years, he left school to pursue an internship at Toronto's now-defunct clothing store, Lounge, where he met Drake.

== Career ==
In 2007, El-Khatib worked as a buyer for Unitedfront, the parent company for Ransom, Goodfoot, and Nomad, three Toronto menswear boutiques. In 2008, Oliver assumed blogging duties for October's Very Own. As the only blogger for the new brand, El-Khatib's job was to promote outlets the OVO crew found interesting. Many of El-Khatib's early blog posts are fashion and music related.

When Drake fired his management in 2011, he hired El-Khatib to be his manager. As part of his managerial role, El-Khatib oversaw Drake's career and continued to build out the OVO brand to include full, seasonal clothing lines, and a record label, OVO Sound, which he formed with Drake and Shebib in 2012.

El-Khatib has also worked collaboratively with Drake and Shebib in the studio. He's listed in the production credits for the song, "The Resistance," from Drake's 2010 album, Thank Me Later when he suggested including a drum sample from the song "Ideas as Opiates" by Tears for Fears. El-Khatib was also listed as an executive producer on Drake's 2017 playlist, More Life. In 2015, El-Khatib and Drake formed October Firm, a music-focused collaborative project.

In 2015, El-Khatib struck up a partnership with Beats 1 on Apple Music and launched OVO Sound Radio, whose first episode aired July 11, 2015. According to El-Khatib, the purpose of OVO Sound Radio is to premier new music, showcase Toronto talent, and show fans that OVO has a pulse on where the industry and genre are headed.

El-Khatib has also established partnerships with the Air Jordan brand, Canada Goose, and Roots, among others. El-Khatib is a self-described worker and spends little time in the spotlight. He helped OVO expand internationally with the launch of UK and EU online stores and a brick-and-mortar store in London.
