= Nineteen85 =

Canadian record producer and songwriter

- Born: Paul Jefferies; July 1, 1985 (age 41); Scarborough, Ontario, Canada
- Genres: Hip hop; R&B; dancehall
- Occupations: Record producer; songwriter
- Instruments: Keyboard; drum machine; sampler; guitar
- Years active: 2008–present

Paul Jefferies (born July 1, 1985), known professionally as Nineteen85, is a Canadian record producer and songwriter. He won the ASCAP Music Award twice consecutively in 2014 and 2015. His stage name is derived from his birth year.

He is best known for producing songs for Drake, such as "One Dance", "Hotline Bling" and "Hold On, We're Going Home". In 2014, he was named by Complex magazine as one of 15 new producers to watch for. In 2015, he founded the R&B duo Dvsn with singer Daniel Daley. He has been nominated for three Grammy Awards, including for "Producer of the Year (Non-Classical)".

== Production discography ==
=== Singles produced ===
List of singles as either producer or co-producer, with selected chart positions and certifications, showing year released and album name
Title	Year	Peak chart positions							Certifications	Album
Title	Year	CAN	AUS	IRL	NZ	UK	US	US R&B /HH	Certifications	Album
"Hold On, We're Going Home" (Drake featuring Majid Jordan)	2013	4	8	7	9	4	4	1	MC: Platinum; ARIA: 8× Platinum; BPI: 3× Platinum; RIAA: 9× Platinum; RMNZ: Gold	Nothing Was the Same
"Too Much " (Drake featuring Sampha)	2013	90	-	-	-	86	64	23	ARIA: Gold; BPI: Silver; RIAA: Platinum; RMNZ: Gold	Nothing Was the Same
"Hazelton Trump" (OB O'Brien)	2014	—	—	—	—	—	—	—		Non-album singles
"0 to 100 / The Catch Up" (Drake)	2014	61	27	—	—	68	35	8	ARIA: 2× Platinum; BPI: Gold; RIAA: 2× Platinum	Non-album singles
"Truffle Butter" (Nicki Minaj featuring Drake and Lil Wayne)	2015	43	18	—	—	188	14	4	ARIA: Platinum	The Pinkprint
"My Love" (Majid Jordan featuring Drake)	2015	—	—	—	—	—	—	—		Majid Jordan
"Hotline Bling" (Drake)	2015	3	2	8	14	3	2	1	MC: Platinum; ARIA: 8× Platinum; BPI: 2× Platinum; RIAA: Diamond; RMNZ: Gold	Views
"One Dance" (Drake featuring Wizkid and Kyla)	2016	1	1	1	1	1	1	1	MC: Diamond; ARIA: 14× Platinum; BPI: 7× Platinum; RIAA: 11× Platinum; RMNZ: 2× Platinum	Views
"Too Good" (Drake featuring Rihanna)	2016	9	3	7	4	3	14	3	MC: 4× Platinum; ARIA: 6× Platinum; BPI: 3× Platinum; RIAA: 5× Platinum; RMNZ: Platinum	Views
"For Free" (DJ Khaled featuring Drake)	2016	71	70	—	—	25	13	4	MC: 2× Platinum; BPI: Gold; RIAA: 3× Platinum	Major Key
"OTW" (Khalid featuring 6lack and Ty Dolla Sign)	2018	30	27	57	11	60	57	35	MC: 2× Platinum; ARIA: 3× Platinum; BPI: Gold; RIAA: 2× Platinum; RMNZ: Gold	Suncity (vinyl edition)
"Outta Time" (Bryson Tiller featuring Drake)	2021	31	60	68	—	24	42	22	MC: Gold; BPI: Silver	Anniversary
"N.H.I.E." (21 Savage and Doja Cat)	2024	15	51	39	37	27	19	9	MC: Gold	American Dream
"—" denotes a recording that did not chart or was not released in that territory.

== Other songs ==
=== 2011 ===
==== Donnis – Southern Lights ====
- 08. "Everybody"

==== Shaun Boothe – Waiting Room ====
- 02. "Do It For You" (featuring Kim Davis)
- 03. "Let Me Go (Remix)" (featuring CyHi The Prynce)
- 04. "One Side"
- 07. "Poor Boy (Remix)" (featuring Kardinal Offishall)
- 08. "1 2 3" (featuring STS)
- 09. "The Arena" (featuring Nadia Stone)
- 12. "Safe To Say"

=== 2013 ===
==== Juicy J – Stay Trippy ====
- 18. "Having Sex" (featuring Trina and 2 Chainz) (produced by Supa Dups, co-produced by Nineteen85)

==== Tiara Thomas – Dear Sallie Mae ====
- 03. "Tell Me Something"

==== R. Kelly – Black Panties ====
- 09. "My Story" (featuring 2 Chainz) (produced with R. Kelly)

=== 2014 ===
==== P. Reign – Dear America ====
- 01. "DnF" (featuring Drake & Future)

==== Jennifer Hudson – JHUD ====
- 01. "Dangerous" (produced with Stephen Kozmeniuk)

==== Jessie Ware – Tough Love ====
- 11. "Desire"

=== 2016 ===
==== Majid Jordan – Majid Jordan ====
- 11. "King City" (produced with Majid Jordan)

==== dvsn – Sept. 5th ====
- 01. "With Me"
- 02. "Too Deep"
- 03. "Try / Effortless" (co-produced by Noël Cadastre and Stephen Kozmeniuk)
- 04. "Do It Well"
- 05. "In + Out"
- 06. "Sept. 5th"
- 07. "Hallucinations" (produced with Stephen Kozmeniuk)
- 08. "Another One"
- 09. "Angela"
- 10. "The Line"

==== Drake – Views ====
- 05. "Hype" (produced with Boi-1da, co-produced by The Beat Bully, add. production by Cubeatz)
- 08. "With You" (featuring PartyNextDoor) (produced by Murda Beatz, add. production by Nineteen85 & Cardiak)
- 09. "Faithful" (featuring Pimp C and dvsn) (produced by 40, co-produced by Boi-1da & Nineteen85)
- 14. "Childs Play" (produced by 40, add. production by Majid Jordan, Metro Boomin & Nineteen85)

==== PartyNextDoor – PartyNextDoor 3 ====
- 04. "Not Nice" (co-produced by 40 & Supa Dups)

==== James Vincent McMorrow – We Move ====
- 01. "Rising Water" (produced with James Vincent McMorrow, co-written by James Vincent McMorrow and Paul Jeffries)
- 03. "Last Story" (produced with James Vincent McMorrow)
- 06. "Get Low"
- 09. "Surreal" (co-produced by James Vincent McMorrow and Ross Dowling)

=== 2017 ===
==== Bleachers — Gone Now ====
- 07. "Let's Get Married" (produced with Jack Antonoff)

==== Drake – More Life ====
- 05. "Get It Together" (featuring Black Coffee and Jorja Smith) (add. production by 40)
- 06. "Madiba Riddim" (produced with Frank Dukes, add. production by Charlie Handsome)

==== dvsn – Morning After ====
- 1. “Run Away”
- 2. “Nuh Time / Tek Time”
- 3. “Keep Calm”
- 4. "Think About Me"
- 5. “Don’t Choose”
- 6. “Mood”
- 7. “P.O.V.”
- 8. “You Do”
- 9. “Morning After”
- 10. “Can’t Wait”
- 11. “Claim”
- 12. “Body Smile”
- 13. “Conversations in a Diner”

=== 2018 ===
==== Travis Scott – Astroworld ====
- 17. "Coffee Bean"

==== Mariah Carey – Caution ====
- 1. "GTFO"

==== Future – Future Hndrxx Presents: The Wizrd ====
- 20. "Tricks on Me"

=== 2019 ===
==== Pvrx – 3.14 ====
- 2. "Stay With Me"
- 3. "Nun New"

==== Ed Sheeran – No.6 Collaborations Project ====
- 12. "I Don’t Want Your Money" (featuring H.E.R.)

=== 2020 ===
==== Dvsn – A Muse in Her Feelings ====
- 1. "No Good" (produced with Manswell, co-produced by Jandre Amos)
- 2. "Friends" (featuring PartyNextDoor) (produced by Noel Cadastre, co-produced by Nineteen85, add. production by 40)
- 3. "Still Pray for You" (co-produced by Raaheim)
- 4. "Courtside" (featuring Jessie Reyez)
- 5. "Miss Me?" (produced with Stwo)
- 6. "No Cryin" (featuring Future) (produced with Cox)
- 7. "Dangerous City" (with Ty Dolla $ign featuring Buju Banton) (produced with Noah Beresin and Hannibal)
- 8. "So What" (featuring Popcaan) (produced with Raaheim, co-produced by Allen Ritter)
- 9. "Outlandish"
- 10. "Keep It Going" (produced with Majid Jordan)
- 11. "Flawless (Do It Well Pt. 3)" (featuring Summer Walker) (produced with Raaheim)
- 12. "Greedy"
- 13. "Between Us" (featuring Snoh Aalegra) (add. production by Amorphous)
- 14. "A Muse" (produced by Allen Ritter, co-produced by Nineteen85)
- 15. "For Us" (produced with Cox)
- 16. "...Again" (featuring Shantel May) (co-produced by Joe Reeves)

=== 2021 ===
==== Drake – Certified Lover Boy ====
- 17. "Get Along Better" (featuring Ty Dolla $ign) (co-produced by 40 and Noel Cadastre)

==== Summer Walker – Still Over It ====
- 19. "4th Baby Mama" (produced with Active By Night, Daniel East, and Slimwav)

=== 2023 ===
==== Mariah the Scientist – To Be Eaten Alive ====
- 2. "Good Times" (produced with Kofibae)
- 4. "40 Days n 40 Nights" (featuring Vory) (produced with K Rain and Treedot)
- 9. "Love Sick" (produced with K Rain)

=== 2024 ===
==== 21 Savage – American Dream ====
- 4. "N.H.I.E." (with Doja Cat) (produced with Kurtis McKenzie, Scribz Riley, and JonahPH)

==== Headie One – The Last One ====
- 18. "Guns & Money" (featuring Tay Iwar) (produced with TSB)

=== 2025 ===
==== Mariah the Scientist – Hearts Sold Separately ====
- 1. "Sacrifice"
- 2. "United Nations + 1000 Ways to Die" (produced with Rogét Chahayed, Victor Truta and Lucas Cardi)
- 3. "Eternal Flame"
- 4. "Is It a Crime" (with Kali Uchis) (produced with Oliver Easton, Mat1k, Austen Jux-Chandler and Treedot)
- 5. "Burning Blue" (produced with Jetski Purp)
- 6. "All I Want + In Pursuit"
- 7. "More" (produced with Jay Century and Ajax)
- 8. "Rainy Days" (produced with Jay Rewind)
- 9. "Like You Never" (produced with Nez)
- 10. "No More Entertainers" (produced with London on da Track)

== Awards and nominations ==
=== Grammy Awards ===
Year	Nominee / work	Award	Result
2017	"Hotline Bling" (as songwriter)	Best Rap Song	Won
2017	Nineteen85	Producer of the Year, Non-Classical	Nominated
2017	Views (as producer)	Album of the Year	Nominated

2021	El Madrileño (as engineer)	Latin, Best Engineered Album.	Won
