= Roy Woods =

Canadian singer and rapper

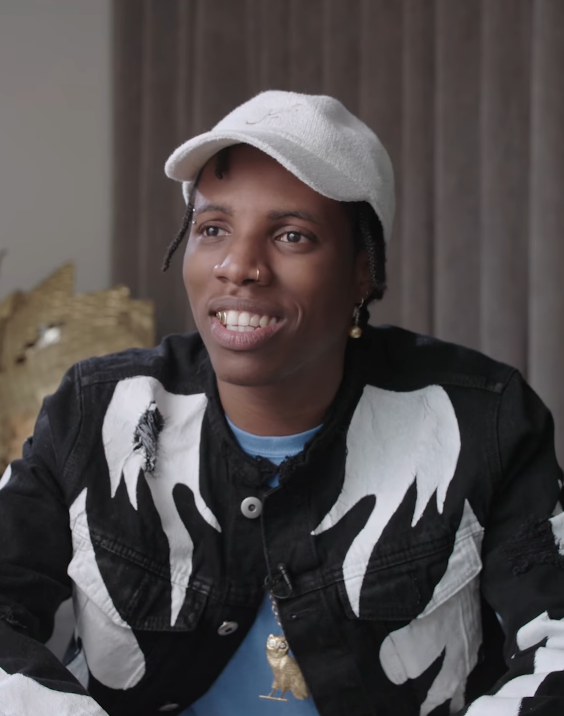
- Woods in 2018

Background information
- Born: Denzel Spencer; April 18, 1996 (age 30); Brampton, Ontario, Canada
- Genres: R&B; hip hop; trap
- Occupations: Singer; rapper; songwriter
- Years active: 2014–present
- Labels: OVO; Warner
- Website: roywoods.com

Denzel Spencer (born April 18, 1996), better known by his stage name Roy Woods (also stylized as Roy Wood$), is a Canadian singer, rapper, and songwriter. He signed with Drake's record label OVO Sound, an imprint of Warner Records in 2014. His first two albums, Waking at Dawn (2016) and Say Less (2017), both moderately entered the Canadian Albums Chart and US Billboard 200. Woods has also founded his own collective, Unlock the Underground.

== Early life ==
Denzel Spencer was born April 18, 1996, in Brampton, Ontario, Canada to Guyanese parents. For over three years, Woods attended Turner Fenton High School and moved to St. Augustine Secondary School during his final year.

== Career ==
=== 2014–2026: Career beginnings, Say Less, and Mixed Emotions ===
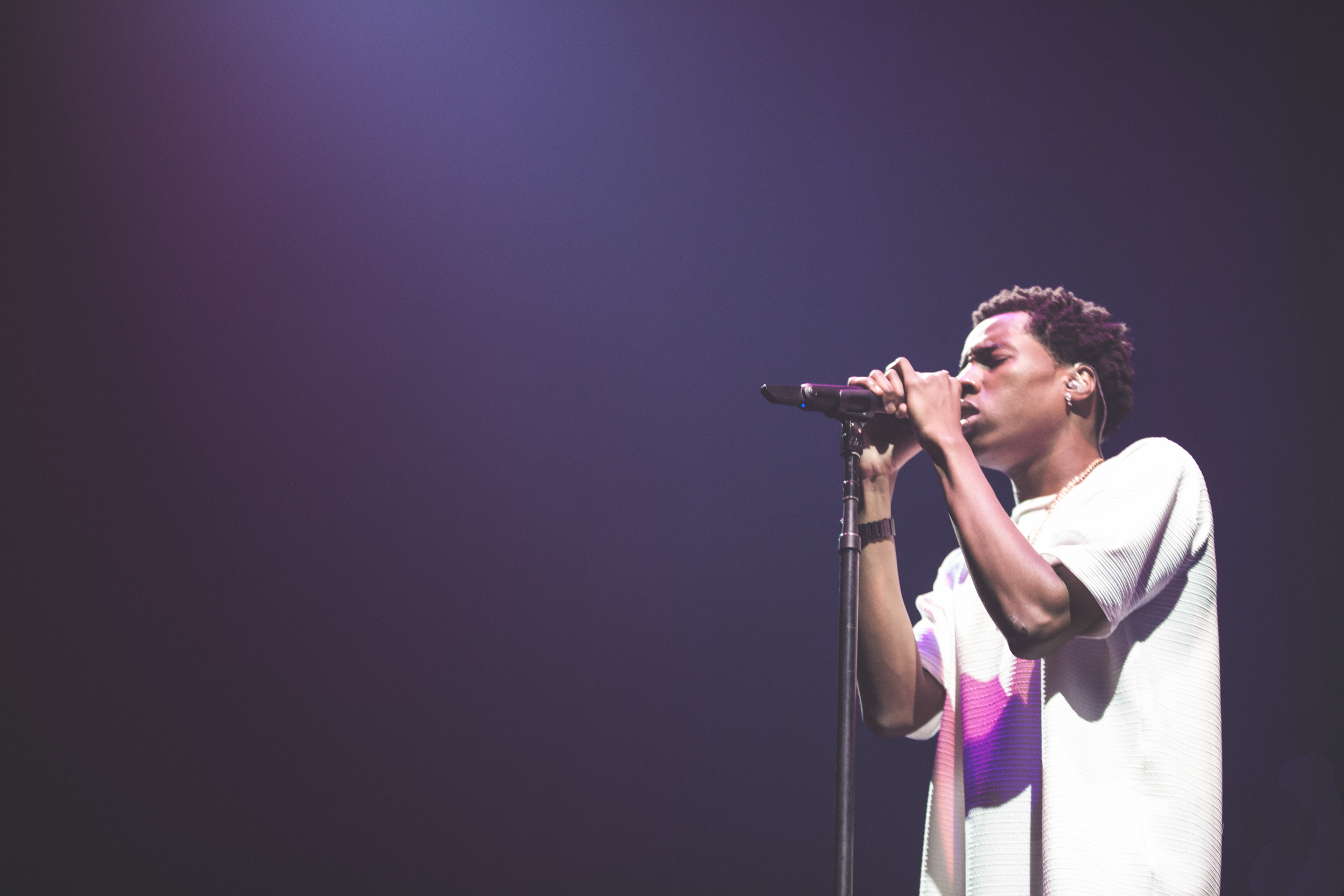
Woods performing in 2016

On July 11, 2015, Drake premiered "Drama", the first song from Woods' EP, Exis. The song was also premiered on Apple's Beats 1 radio during the first OVO Sound radio show. The track also features with the guest appearances from Woods' label boss, Drake. On July 25, 2015, a second song titled "Get You Good" premiered on the second episode of the OVO Sound radio show. On July 31, 2015, Roy released his debut EP Exis digitally through OVO Sound, of which was the record label co-founded by Canadian rapper and singer Drake. On October 9, 2015, Woods released his first music video for his song, "Jealousy". It has since garnered over 9,000,000 views on YouTube.

On July 1, 2016, Wood's debut mixtape, Waking at Dawn, was released and promoted by Woods and other artists, including Drake and Wiz Khalifa through social media.

On December 23, 2016, Woods released his second EP, titled Nocturnal.

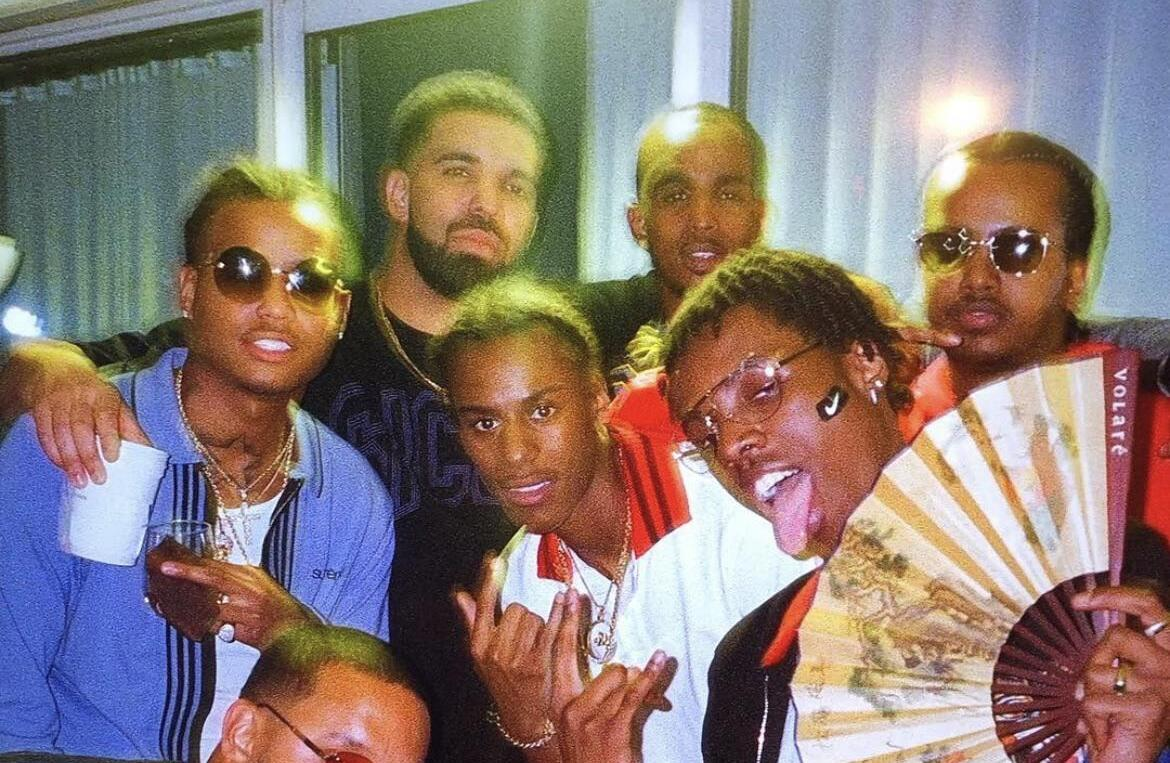
OVOFEST 2017. From left to right: Jay Whiss, Drake, Smoke Dawg, Mo-G, Roy Woods and SAFE.

On July 20, 2017, Woods released the track, "What Are You On?", as the lead single from his debut studio album, Say Less. On November 17, 2017, Woods released the title track, "Say Less". On December 1, 2017, Woods released his debut studio album, Say Less.

On June 8, 2018, Woods released two new singles, titled "Russian Cream" and "Snow White", with no prior announcement.

On February 8, 2019, Roy Woods released a single titled "Worth It".

On September 18, 2019, Roy Woods released a single titled "Bubbly".

On May 8, 2020, Roy Woods released the single titled "I Feel It"

On May 15, 2020, Roy Woods released his third EP, titled Dem Times.

In 2023, he participated in an all-star recording of Serena Ryder's single "What I Wouldn't Do", which was released as a charity single to benefit Kids Help Phone's Feel Out Loud campaign for youth mental health.

On July 28, 2023, Roy Woods released his second studio album, titled Mixed Emotions. The album features guest appearances from Coi Leray, Jada Kingdom, and Vory, and was preceded by the singles "Touch You", "Insecure", "Bad Bad", "Don't Love Me", "Young Boy Problems", "Don't Mind Me", and "Test What I Know".

== Artistry ==
Woods has said some of his biggest influences are Michael Jackson, Drake, Nelly, The Weeknd and PartyNextDoor. Woods has also started an artist collective, titled Unlock The Underground, which is a branch of the OVO Sound. The artists on this collective include In-house Producer/Engineer BATMANONTHEBEATZ, RAYNY, and DOLOINDACUT as Wood's DJ.

== Discography ==
=== Studio albums ===
List of studio albums, with selected chart positions and sales figures
Title	Album details	Peak chart positions			
Title	Album details	CAN	US	US R&B /HH	US R&B
Waking at Dawn	Released: July 1, 2016; Label: OVO, Warner; Formats: Digital download	30	127	11	6
Say Less	Released: December 1, 2017; Label: OVO, Warner; Formats: CD, LP, digital download	26	92	38	11
Mixed Emotions	Released: July 28, 2023; Label: OVO, Warner; Formats: Digital download, streaming	—	—	—	—
Rolling Stone	Released: December 6, 2024; Label: OVO, Santa Anna Label Group; Formats: Digital download, streaming	—	—	—	—
X	Released: August 7, 2026; Label: OVO, Santa Anna Label Group; Formats: Digital download, streaming	—	—	—	—
"—" denotes a recording that did not chart or was not released in that territory.

=== Extended plays ===
List of extended plays, with selected chart positions and sales figures
Title	Album details	Peak chart positions	
Title	Album details	US R&B /HH	US R&B
Exis	Released: July 31, 2015; Label: OVO Sound, Warner Bros.; Formats: Digital download	27	10
Nocturnal	Released: December 23, 2016; Label: OVO Sound, Warner Bros.; Formats: Digital download	—	—
Dem Times	Released: May 15, 2020; Label: OVO Sound, Warner Bros.; Formats: Digital download	—	—
Flower City Heartbreak	Released: November 21, 2025; Label: OVO Sound, Warner Bros.; Formats: Digital download	—	—
"—" denotes a recording that did not chart or was not released in that territory.

=== Singles ===
Title	Year	Peak chart positions			Certifications	Album
Title	Year	US R&B	IRE	UK	Certifications	Album
"Drama" (featuring Drake)	2015	—	—	—	BPI: Silver; RIAA: 2× Platinum	Exis
"Gwan Big Up Urself"	2016	—	—	—		Waking at Dawn
"How I Feel"	2016	—	—	—		Waking at Dawn
"What Are You On?"	2017	—	—	—		Say Less
"Russian Cream"	2018	—	—	—		Non-album singles
"Snow White"	2018	—	—	—		Non-album singles
"Worth It"	2019	—	—	—		Non-album singles
"Bubbly"	2019	—	—	—		Non-album singles
"Juliet & Romeo" (with Martin Solveig)	2019	—	79	51	BPI: Gold	Non-album singles
"Shot Again"	2020	—	—	—		Non-album singles
"Too Much" (with Dimitri Vegas & Like Mike and Dvbbs)	2021	—	—	—		Non-album singles
"Touch You"	2021	21	—	—		Mixed Emotions
"Speeding"	2022	—	—	—		Non-album single
"Insecure"	2022	—	—	—		Mixed Emotions
"Bad Bad"	2022	—	—	—		Mixed Emotions
"Luces" (with Fuego and Polimá Westcoast)	2023	—	—	—		Non-album single
"Don't Love Me"	2023	—	—	—		Mixed Emotions
"Young Boy Problems"	2023	—	—	—		Mixed Emotions
"Don't Mind Me"	2023	—	—	—		Mixed Emotions
"Test What I Know"	2023	—	—	—		Mixed Emotions
"Hold Still"	2024	—	—	—		Rolling Stone
"Honey" (with Levi, Akon and Halle Abadi)	2026	—	—	—		Non-album singles
"Get Down" (with Mally Mall, AryaXO and 6am)	2026	—	—	—		Non-album singles
"Tempting" (with WhoJiggi)	2026	—	—	—		Non-album singles
"Trust and Believe"	2026	—	—	—		X
"Brunch"	2026	—	—	—		X
"Beautiful"	2026	—	—	—		X
"—" denotes a recording that did not chart or was not released in that territory.

=== Other charted and certified songs ===
Title	Year	Certification	Album
"Get You Good"	2015	RIAA: Gold	Exis
"Instinct" (featuring MadeinTYO)	2016	RIAA: Gold	Nocturnal

=== Music videos ===
List of music videos, with directors, showing year released
Title	Year	Director(s)
"Jealousy"	2015	Jim Joe
"Get You Good"	2015	Christo Anesti and Glenn Michael (Kid. Studio)
"Gwan Big Up Urself"	2016	Christo Anesti and Glenn Michael (Kid. Studio)
"Go Go Go"	2016	Christo Anesti and Glenn Michael (Kid. Studio)
"Love You"	2017	Ninja Djacic
"Instinct" (featuring MadeinTYO)	2017	Elliot Clancy Osberg
"Say Less"	2017	Gab3
"Monday to Monday"	2017	Unknown
"Something New"	2018	Elliot Clancy Osberg
"Snow White"	2018	Alfy

== Tours ==
Headlining

- Unlocked Tour (2016)
- Say Less Tour (2018)
- Me And U Tour (2023)

Supporting

- Summer Sixteen Tour (with Drake & Future) (2016)
- Aubrey and the Three Migos Tour (with Drake & Migos) (2018)

== Filmography ==
Film and television
Year	Title	Role	Notes
2017	6IX RISING	Himself	Documentary (non-speaking appearance)
