= Stwo =

- Born: Steven Vidal; 18 July 1992 (age 33); Clinique de Cormeilles en Parisis, France
- Genres: Electronic; hip hop; R&B; dance
- Occupations: Producer; DJ
- Years active: 2007–present
- Labels: HW&W

Steven Vidal (born 18 July 1992), known by his stage name Stwo, is a French electronic musician, producer and DJ.

== Early life ==
Stwo was born Steven Vidal on 18 July 1992 in Paris, France. He grew up playing piano and bass guitar.

== Career ==
Stwo began producing music at the age of 18. His career really took off when the song "Lovin U" off his free EP "Beyond", released by Live For The Funk exploded across the internet attracting millions of listeners. To date, Stwo has toured over 30 countries worldwide as a DJ.

In 2013, he signed with Los Angeles- and Toronto-based record label HW&W Recordings after meeting Kaytranada and his manager while they were on tour in Paris.

In late 2014, OVO in house producer 40 reached out to Stwo after released the mixtape "92", which was all instrumentals inspired by Drake's "Nothing Was The Same". Steven went on to sign an exclusive deal with 40’s publishing company, Alice Island.

His debut single “Haunted” was released commercially on 9 October 2015. Jaden Smith premiered it on his Beats1 radio show on 13 November 2015. It peaked at number 27 on iTunes electronic charts.

Speculation arose that Stwo would be working with Drake after signing with 40's publishing company in 2015. On 29 April 2016 Drake released his highly anticipated album "Views", and Stwo was credited as co-producer on "Weston Road Flows" via 40's Twitter.

On 29 July 2016 Stwo released “D.T.S.T.N.T.” via HW&W Recordings.

On 28 April 2017 Vidal shared a one-hour mix full of unreleased material via NTS Radio.

== Discography ==
- Beyond (2013)
- D.T.S.N.T. (2016)
- 92 (2017)
