= OVO Sound =

Canadian record label

- Founded: 2009
- Founder: Drake; 40; Oliver El-Khatib
- Distributors: Warner Records (2012–2022); Santa Anna Music Group (2024–present); Republic Records (Drake releases; 2012–present)
- Genre: Hip-hop; Toronto sound; trap; R&B; dancehall
- Country of origin: Canada
- Location: Toronto, Ontario
- Official website: ovosound.com

OVO Sound (short for October's Very Own) is a Canadian independent record label, founded in 2009 by rapper Drake, producer 40, and manager Oliver El-Khatib. The label operated as a subsidiary of Warner Music Group until 2022, after which it became an independent label.

The label has signed acts including PartyNextDoor, ILoveMakonnen, Majid Jordan, Roy Woods, Dvsn, Baka Not Nice, Popcaan, Smiley, Naomi Sharon, and Pimmie. In-house producers include 40 himself, Boi-1da, Nineteen85, Mike Zombie, and T-Minus.

== History ==
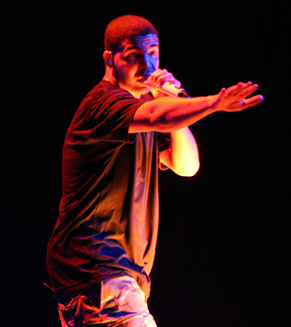
Drake founded the label in 2009.

The label's roots can be traced back to 2006, when Drake's first official mixtape, Room for Improvement, was released under the unofficial record label "All Things Fresh" which eventually became "October's Very Own". Drake later raised the profile of the label by prominently featuring OVO throughout his music, regularly mentioning the label in songs and on stage, as well as promoting OVO merchandise.

The record label was officially founded in 2009 by Drake and long-time collaborators Noah "40" Shebib and Oliver El-Khatib following the success of Drake's third mixtape So Far Gone. According to Billboard, Drake signed a five-year partnership deal with Warner Records, which was extended in 2017.

Drake was signed as a solo artist to Republic Records through Young Money and Cash Money for nine years. Drake's 2018 release Scorpion was his last project under Young Money/Cash Money. On the other hand, the artists Drake signs to OVO Sound through Warner have their content distributed through the latter.

Upon founding the label in 2012, Drake and 40 signed frequent collaborators Boi-1da, T-Minus, and Mike Zombie to the label as in-house producers (the latter two are the only active signees in the label to come outside of Canada). In April 2013, it was reported that Drake was close to signing the label's first recording artist, PartyNextDoor, which he ended up revealing shortly thereafter. In August 2013, Drake announced that he signed Toronto music duo Majid Jordan to OVO Sound. OB O'Brien and iLoveMakonnen would soon sign in 2014, with the latter being the first non-Canadian act and second non-Canadian signee after to Mike Zombie. Makonnen would eventually leave OVO Sound in April 2016, wishing to pursue his interests as a solo artist with Warner. Canadian rap artist Roy Woods and R&B duo Dvsn, composed of singer Daniel Daley and producer Nineteen85, soon joined the label in 2015 and 2016, with each act releasing an EP and studio album respectively. In 2021, Canadian rapper Smiley was signed to the label.

On January 20, 2023 OVO announced the signing of Dutch-Caribbean singer, Naomi Sharon, becoming the first female artist on the label.

On January 23, 2024 Santa Anna Label Group, a subsidiary of Sony Music, announced an investment and partnership with OVO Sound, stating that they'd take over distribution for the label alongside provide new and existing A&Rs for the label.

== Roster ==
=== Current acts ===
Act	Year	Releases
Drake	2009	9
PartyNextDoor	2013	7
Majid Jordan	2013	4
Roy Woods	2014	6
Popcaan	2016	3
Baka Not Nice	2017	1
Smiley	2021	2
Naomi Sharon	2023	2
Pimmie	2026	1

=== Former acts ===
Act	Year	Releases
ILoveMakonnen	2014–2016	4
Plaza	2017–2021	1
Dvsn	2015–2025	5

=== In-house producers ===
Act	Year
40	2012
Boi-1da	2012
Nineteen85	2013

== OVO Sound Radio ==
OVO Sound Radio was a radio program that aired on Beats 1, fortnightly on Saturdays. The show primarily aired newer material, with at least one song premiering in each broadcast. The show's initial airing was on July 11, 2015, and it was hosted by Drake and Oliver El-Khatib. The show is notable for debuting hit Drake singles, such as platinum-selling "Hotline Bling", and chart-topping "One Dance". The show ended on October 27, 2018.

=== Sound 42 ===
On March 4, 2021, Drake announced that he and Oliver would debut their new 24-hour radio station, "Sound 42" on SiriusXM featuring the return of OVO Sound Radio that same night. In an interview with GQ, Drake spoke on the partnership saying "It's something that Scott [Greenstein] from SiriusXM was extremely passionate about from the inception of our partnership. He's been so supportive with us as far as Sound 42 goes. And Sirius offers us the opportunity to be heard far and wide, right? Sirius is just the closest thing we have to those days of glory radio moments and I still get a massive amount of joy premiering music when I know that everyone is listening at the same time." The station's contract with SiriusXM expired in March 2025.

== OVO Clothing ==
OVO Clothing was launched in 2011. The series of clothing began with a series of collaborations between Roots Canada and OVO, which produced several parkas, jackets and other collaborations. In 2013, merchandise for the OVO figurehead included collaborations with the Toronto Raptors, which coincided with Drake becoming the franchise's Global Ambassador. OVO has since morphed into a clothing line in itself, releasing a slew of clothes during every season of the year. T-shirts, sweatshirts, varsity jackets, baseball hats, and knit beanies are seasonal installations. OVO Clothing oversaw the opening of the first OVO store for the brand's clothing in downtown Toronto, opening on December 6, 2014. Exactly a year after the opening in Toronto, OVO stores expanded to the United States, opening a flagship store in Los Angeles, California. Its New York store opened in December 2016 on Bond Street, and its Chicago store in August 2019 on Walton Street in Gold Coast. OVO also opened its first location in Vancouver in December 2018.

Its pre-2016 collection was composed of basketball shorts, OVO jerseys, track jackets, and baggy hoodies.

On November 9, 2020, it was revealed via the OVO Clothing Instagram account that NHL Hall of Famer Wayne Gretzky would be a model for the Fall and Winter 2020 collection. Gretzky and OVO Clothing founder Drake are both native to southern Ontario, Canada. Also featured in the collection was former Canadian Olympian Ross Rebagliati, who won a gold medal in Giant Slalom Snowboarding in the 1998 Nagano Olympics.

=== OVO Collaborations ===
Since its inception, OVO has collaborated with various sports franchises, athletes, sports apparel companies and fashion brands such as:

- Red Bull Racing
- NFL (Fanatics, Inc.) (Note: Baltimore Ravens, Buffalo Bills, Chicago Bears, Dallas Cowboys, Green Bay Packers, Las Vegas Raiders, New York Giants, San Francisco 49ers & more.)
- SMEG
- Yale University
- Air Jordan
- NCAA
- FaZe Clan
- NBA
- Clarks
- Canada Goose
- FC Barcelona
- NHL (Note: Toronto Maple Leafs)
- Toronto Raptors – OVO Athletic Centre sponsorship

== OVO Fest ==
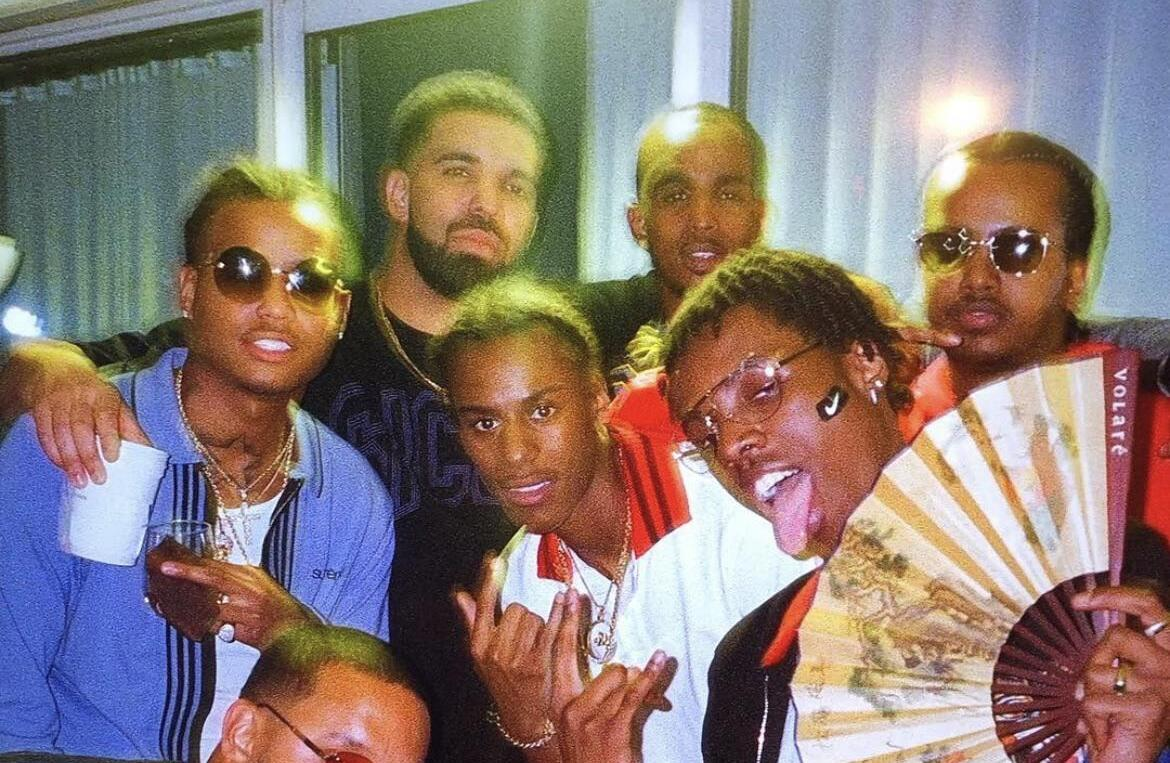
Drake with OVO Fest 2017 performers Jay Whiss, Mo-G, Smoke Dawg, SAFE and Roy Woods

OVO Fest is a music festival founded in 2010 by Drake, Noah "40" Shebib, and Oliver El-Khatib. Typically held annually in Toronto, the festival has featured performances from OVO Sound artists alongside prominent guest artists.

The inaugural OVO Fest in 2010 featured guest appearances by Jay-Z and Eminem. The festival subsequently became known for its lineup of high-profile artists. Following an annual run, the festival was put on hiatus after 2019 due to the COVID-19 pandemic. It returned in 2022 for a "October World Weekend" event that featured a Young Money reunion. In May 2025, Drake announced the festival's annual return for summer 2025.

Throughout its history, OVO Fest has included special guest performances from artists such as Stevie Wonder, Lil Wayne, Nas, Kanye West, and Lauryn Hill.

OVO Fest has been used to promote the OVO Sound label and its roster of artists. The festival is known for its connection to the city of Toronto and has attracted attendees from around the world.

== Discography ==
=== Studio albums ===
Artist	Album	Details	Peak chart positions		Certification
Artist	Album	Details	CAN (Note: References for Canadian Albums Chart)	US (Note: References for Billboard 200)	Certification
Drake	Nothing Was the Same	Released: September 24, 2013; Label: Young Money, Cash Money, Republic, OVO Sound; Formats: CD, digital download	1	1	RIAA: 6× Platinum
PartyNextDoor	PartyNextDoor Two	Released: July 28, 2014; Label: OVO Sound, Warner; Formats: CD, LP, digital download	19	15	RIAA: Gold
Majid Jordan	Majid Jordan	Released: February 5, 2016; Label: OVO Sound, Warner; Formats: CD, LP, digital download	20	69	
Dvsn	Sept. 5th	Released: March 27, 2016; Label: OVO Sound, Warner; Formats: CD, LP, digital download	69	133	
Roy Woods	Waking at Dawn	Released: July 1, 2016; Label: OVO Sound, Warner; Formats: Digital download	30	127	
PartyNextDoor	PartyNextDoor 3	Released: August 12, 2016; Label: OVO Sound, Warner; Formats: CD, LP, digital download	4	3	RIAA: Gold
Dvsn	Morning After	Released: October 13, 2017; Label: OVO Sound, Warner; Formats: CD, LP, digital download	19	38	
Majid Jordan	The Space Between	Released: October 27, 2017; Label: OVO Sound, Warner; Formats: CD, LP, digital download	30	74	
Roy Woods	Say Less	Released: December 1, 2017; Label: OVO Sound, Warner; Formats: CD, LP, digital download	26	92	
PartyNextDoor	Partymobile	Released: March 27, 2020; Label: OVO Sound, Warner; Formats: CD, LP, digital download	3	8	
Dvsn	A Muse in Her Feelings	Released: April 17, 2020; Label: OVO Sound, Warner; Formats: CD, LP, digital download	13	23	
Popcaan	Fixtape	Released: August 7, 2020; Label: OVO Sound, Warner; Formats: Digital download	15	94	
Dvsn & Ty Dolla Sign	Cheers to the Best Memories	Released: August 20, 2021; Label: OVO Sound, Warner; Format: Digital download, streaming	—	139	
Drake	Certified Lover Boy	Released: September 3, 2021; Label: Republic, OVO Sound; Formats: CD, LP, digital download	1	1	RIAA: 3× Platinum
Majid Jordan	Wildest Dreams	Released: October 22, 2021; Label: OVO Sound, Warner; Formats: CD, LP, digital download	—	—	
Smiley	Buy or Bye 2	Released: November 12, 2021; Label: OVO Sound, Warner; Formats: Digital download	—	—	
Drake	Honestly, Nevermind	Released: June 17, 2022; Label: Republic, OVO Sound; Formats: Digital download, streaming	1	1	RIAA: Platinum
Dvsn	Working on My Karma	Released: October 22, 2022; Label: OVO Sound, Warner; Formats: Digital download, streaming	—	—	
Drake & 21 Savage	Her Loss	Released: November 4, 2022; Label: Republic, OVO Sound; Formats: Digital download, streaming	1	1	RIAA: 2× Platinum
Popcaan	Great Is He	Released: January 27, 2023; Label: OVO Sound; Formats: Digital download	—	—	
Roy Woods	Mixed Emotions	Released: July 28, 2023; Label: OVO Sound; Formats: Digital download	—	—	
Drake	For All the Dogs	Released: October 6, 2023; Label: Republic, OVO Sound; Formats: Digital download, streaming	1	1	
Naomi Sharon	Obsidian	Released: October 20, 2023; Label: OVO Sound, Santa Anna; Formats: Digital download, streaming, LP	—	—	
Majid Jordan	Good People	Released: November 3, 2023; Label: OVO Sound; Formats: Digital download, streaming, LP	—	—	
PartyNextDoor	PartyNextDoor 4	Released: April 26, 2024; Label: OVO Sound, Santa Anna; Formats: Digital download, streaming, LP	13	10	
Roy Woods	Rolling Stone	Released: December 6, 2024; Label: OVO Sound, Santa Anna; Formats: Digital download, streaming	—	—	
Drake and PartyNextDoor	Some Sexy Songs 4 U	Released: February 14, 2025; Label: Republic, OVO Sound, Santa Anna; Formats: Digital download, streaming	1	1	
Drake	Iceman	Released: May 15, 2026; Label: Republic, OVO Sound; Formats: Digital download, streaming	—	1	
Drake	Maid of Honour	Released: May 15, 2026; Label: Republic, OVO Sound; Formats: Digital download, streaming	—	3	
Drake	Habibti	Released: May 15, 2026; Label: Republic, OVO Sound; Formats: Digital download, streaming	—	2	
Naomi Sharon	No Sleep in Paradise	Released: June 26, 2026; Label: OVO Sound, Santa Anna; Formats: Digital download, streaming, LP	—	—	
Roy Woods	X	Released: August 7, 2026; Label: OVO Sound, Santa Anna; Formats: Digital download, streaming	—	—	
Majid Jordan	Two Roads	Released: August 28, 2026; Label: OVO Sound, Santa Anna; Formats: Digital download, streaming	—	—	

=== Compilation albums ===
Artist	Album	Details	Peak chart positions		Certification
Artist	Album	Details	CAN	US	Certification
Drake	Care Package	Released: August 2, 2019; Label: Republic, OVO Sound; Formats: Streaming, digital download	1	1	

=== Soundtrack albums ===
Artist	Album	Details
Various Artists	Top Boy (A Selection of Music Inspired by the Series)	Released: September 13, 2019; Label: OVO Sound, Warner; Formats: Streaming, digital download

=== Mixtapes ===
Artist	Album	Details	Peak chart positions		Certification
Artist	Album	Details	CAN	US	Certification
Drake	If You're Reading This It's Too Late	Released: February 13, 2015; Label: Young Money, Cash Money, Republic, OVO Sound; Formats: CD, LP, digital download	1	1	RIAA: 4× Platinum
Popcaan	Vanquish	Released: December 20, 2019; Label: OVO Sound, Warner; Formats: Digital download	—	—	
Drake	Dark Lane Demo Tapes	Released: May 1, 2020; Label: Republic, OVO Sound; Format: Streaming, digital download	1	2	

=== EPs ===
Artist	Album	Details
PartyNextDoor	PartyNextDoor	Released: July 1, 2013; Label: OVO Sound, Warner Bros.; Formats: Digital download
Majid Jordan	A Place Like This	Released: July 17, 2014; Label: OVO Sound, Warner Bros.; Formats: Digital download
PartyNextDoor	Colours	Released: December 3, 2014; Label: OVO Sound, Warner Bros.; Formats: Digital download
iLoveMakonnen	iLoveMakonnen	Released: December 15, 2014; Label: OVO Sound, Warner Bros.; Formats: Digital download
Roy Woods	Exis	Released: July 31, 2015; Label: OVO Sound, Warner Bros.; Formats: Digital download
iLoveMakonnen	iLoveMakonnen 2	Released: November 20, 2015; Label: OVO Sound, Warner Bros.; Formats: Digital download
Roy Woods	Nocturnal	Released: December 21, 2016; Label: OVO Sound, Warner Bros.; Formats: Digital download
PartyNextDoor	Colours 2	Released: June 2, 2017; Label: OVO Sound, Warner Bros.; Formats: Digital download
Plaza	SHADOWS	Released: June 10, 2017; Label: OVO Sound, Warner Bros.; Formats: Digital download
PartyNextDoor	Seven Days	Released: September 28, 2017; Label: OVO Sound, Warner Bros.; Formats: Digital download
Baka Not Nice	4Milli	Released: August 3, 2018; Label: OVO Sound, Warner Bros.; Formats: Digital download
Drake	The Best in the World Pack	Released: June 15, 2019; Label: OVO Sound, Frozen Moments, Republic; Formats: Digital download, streaming
Roy Woods	Dem Times	Released: May 15, 2020; Label: OVO Sound, Warner; Formats: Digital download
PartyNextDoor	Partypack	Released: October 16, 2020; Label: OVO Sound, Warner; Formats: Digital download
Drake	Scary Hours 2	Released: March 5, 2021; Label: OVO Sound, Republic; Formats: Digital download, streaming
Naomi Sharon	Another Life	Released: January 20, 2023; Label: OVO Sound; Formats: Digital download, streaming
