= PartyNextDoor discography =

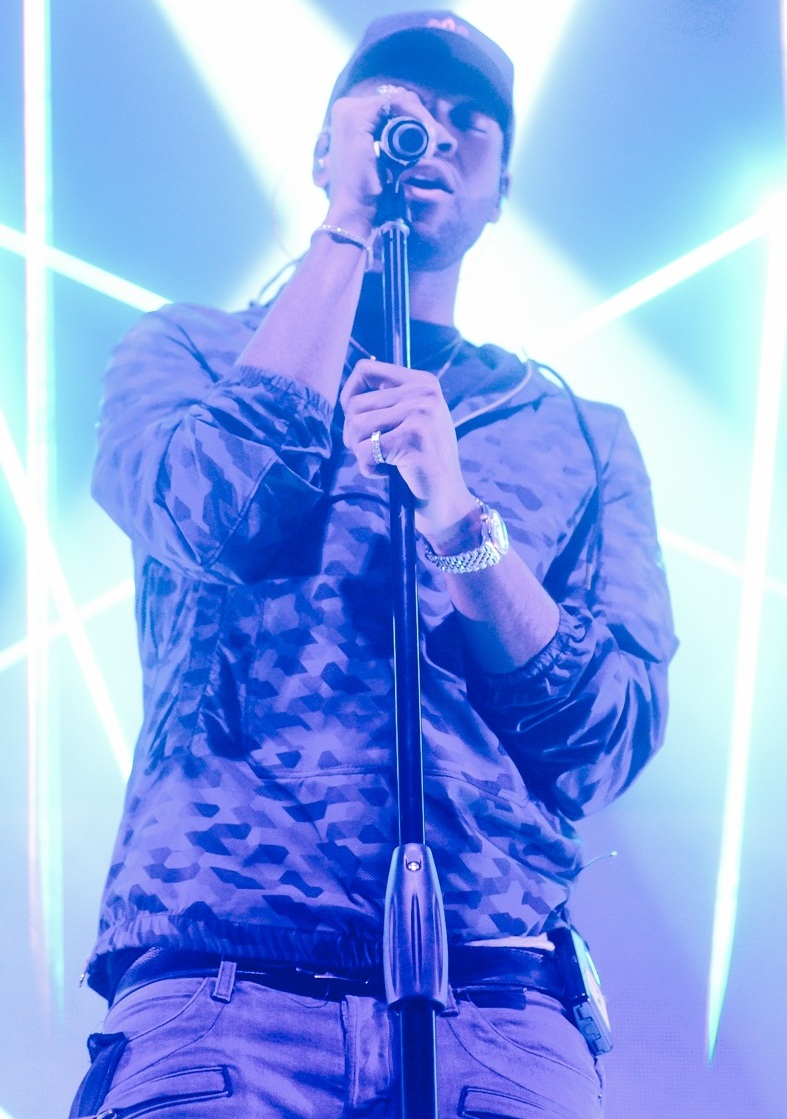
- PartyNextDoor performing in November 2016
- Studio albums: 4
- EPs: 4
- Singles: 25
- Mixtapes: 1
- Collaborative albums: 1

Canadian singer PartyNextDoor has released four studio albums, one collaborative album, one mixtape, four extended plays, and twenty-five singles (including nine as a featured artist).

== Albums ==
=== Studio albums ===
List of studio albums, with selected chart positions, sales figures and certifications
Title	Album details	Peak chart positions										Sales	Certifications
Title	Album details	CAN	AUS	DEN	FRA	IRE	NZ	NOR	SWE	UK	US	Sales	Certifications
PartyNextDoor Two	Released: July 29, 2014; Label: OVO, Warner; Formats: CD, LP, digital download, streaming	19	—	—	—	—	—	—	—	66	15		MC: Platinum; IFPI DEN: Gold; RIAA: Platinum
PartyNextDoor 3	Released: August 12, 2016; Label: OVO, Warner; Formats: CD, LP, digital download, streaming	3	13	—	79	—	14	—	—	11	3	US: 29,000 (Note: In 2016 the album sold 29,000 pure copies)	MC: Platinum; RMNZ: Gold; RIAA: Platinum
Partymobile	Released: March 27, 2020; Label: OVO, Warner; Formats: CD, LP, digital download, streaming	3	22	14	29	29	27	8	18	7	8	US: 3,000 (Note: In 2020 the album sold 3,000 pure copies)	MC: Platinum; RMNZ: Gold; RIAA: Gold
PartyNextDoor 4	Released: April 26, 2024; Label: OVO, Santa Anna; Formats: LP, digital download, streaming	13	62	—	—	—	26	—	—	26	10	US: 3,000 (Note: In 2024 the album sold 3,000 pure copies)	MC: Gold; BPI: Silver; RIAA: Gold; RMNZ: Gold
"—" denotes a recording that did not chart or was not released in that territory.

=== Collaborative albums ===
List of collaborative albums, with date released
Title	Album details	Peak chart positions										Sales	Certifications
Title	Album details	CAN	AUS	DEN	FRA	IRE	NZ	NOR	SWE	UK	US	Sales	Certifications
Some Sexy Songs 4 U (with Drake)	Released: February 14, 2025; Label: OVO, Santa Anna, Republic; Format: CD, LP, cassette, digital download, streaming	1	2	2	14	2	2	2	6	3	1	US: 66,237 (Note: In 2025, the album sold 66,237 pure copies.)	MC: 2× Platinum; BPI: Silver; RIAA: Platinum

== Mixtapes ==
List of extended plays, with selected chart positions and sales figures
Title	Details	Peak chart positions		Sales	Certifications
Title	Details	US R&B /HH	US R&B	Sales	Certifications
PartyNextDoor	Released: July 1, 2013; Label: OVO, Warner; Formats: CD, digital download, LP	34	17	US: 2,000	RIAA: Platinum

== EPs ==
List of extended plays, with selected chart positions and sales figures
Title	Details	Peak chart positions			
Title	Details	CAN	US	US R&B /HH	US R&B
Colours	Released: December 3, 2014; Label: OVO, Warner; Formats: Digital download	—	—	—	—
Colours 2	Released: June 2, 2017; Label: OVO, Warner; Formats: Digital download	47	56	23	7
Seven Days	Released: September 28, 2017; Label: OVO, Warner; Formats: Digital download	28	82	44	12
Partypack	Released: October 16, 2020; Label: OVO, Warner; Formats: Digital download, streaming	68	117	—	18
"—" denotes a recording that did not chart or was not released in that territory.

== Singles ==
=== As lead artist ===
List of singles as lead artist, with selected chart positions, showing year released and album name
Title	Year	Peak chart positions										Certifications	Album
Title	Year	CAN	AUS	DEN	FRA	IRE	NZ	NOR	SWE	UK	US	Certifications	Album
"Over Here" (featuring Drake)	2013	—	—	—	—	—	—	—	—	—	—	MC: Gold; RIAA: Gold	PartyNextDoor
"Recognize" (featuring Drake)	2014	—	—	—	—	—	—	—	—	—	— (Note: "Recognize" did not enter the Billboard Hot 100, but peaked at number three on the Bubbling Under Hot 100 Singles chart.)	MC: 3× Platinum; BPI: Gold; RIAA: 4× Platinum; RMNZ: Platinum	PartyNextDoor Two
"Sex on the Beach"	2014	—	—	—	—	—	—	—	—	—	—	MC: Platinum; BPI: Silver; RIAA: Gold; RMNZ: Gold	PartyNextDoor Two
"Come and See Me" (featuring Drake)	2016	73	—	—	129	—	—	—	—	199	55	MC: 5× Platinum; BPI: Platinum; IFPI DEN: Gold; RIAA: 7× Platinum; RMNZ: 2× Platinum	PartyNextDoor 3
"Like Dat" (with Jeremih featuring Lil Wayne)	2016	—	—	—	—	—	—	—	—	—	—		Non-album single
"Not Nice"	2016	56	—	—	—	—	—	—	—	98	82	MC: 3× Platinum; BPI: Gold; RIAA: Platinum; RMNZ: Gold	PartyNextDoor 3
"Loyal" (featuring Drake)	2019	19	82	—	—	60	— (Note: "Loyal" did not enter the NZ Top 40 Singles Chart, but peaked at number 11 on the NZ Hot Singles Chart.)	—	—	31	60	MC: 3× Platinum; BPI: Silver; RIAA: 2× Platinum; RMNZ: Gold	Partymobile
"The News"	2019	87	—	—	—	—	—	—	—	—	—	MC: Gold; RIAA: Gold	Partymobile
"Split Decision"	2020	—	—	—	—	—	—	—	—	—	—		Partymobile
"Believe It" (with Rihanna)	2020	39	28	32	48	16	15	29	28	12	23	MC: Platinum; BPI: Gold; IFPI DEN: Gold; RIAA: 2× Platinum; RMNZ: 2× Platinum	Partymobile
"Excitement" (with Trippie Redd)	2020	—	—	—	—	—	— (Note: "Excitement" did not enter the NZ Top 40 Singles Chart, but peaked at number 14 on the NZ Hot Singles Chart.)	—	—	—	— (Note: "Excitement" did not enter the Billboard Hot 100, but peaked at number 11 on the Bubbling Under Hot 100 Singles chart.)	MC: Platinum; RIAA: Gold; RMNZ: Platinum	Pegasus
"Her Old Friends"	2023	78	—	—	—	—	—	—	—	—	—	MC: Gold	PartyNextDoor 4
"Resentment"	2023	—	—	—	—	—	— (Note: "Resentment" did not enter the NZ Top 40 Singles Chart, but peaked at number 14 on the NZ Hot Singles Chart.)	—	—	—	—	MC: Platinum; RIAA: Gold	PartyNextDoor 4
"Real Woman"	2024	98	—	—	—	—	— (Note: "Real Woman" did not enter the NZ Top 40 Singles Chart, but peaked at number 15 on the NZ Hot Singles Chart.)	—	—	—	—	RIAA: Gold	PartyNextDoor 4
"Lose My Mind"	2024	—	—	—	—	—	— (Note: "Lose My Mind" did not enter the NZ Top 40 Singles Chart, but peaked at number 22 on the NZ Hot Singles Chart.)	—	—	—	— (Note: "Lose My Mind" did not enter the Billboard Hot 100, but peaked at number nine on the Bubbling Under Hot 100 chart.)	MC: Gold	PartyNextDoor 4
"Dreamin'"	2024	70	—	—	—	—	—	—	—	86	— (Note: "Dreamin'" did not enter the Billboard Hot 100, but peaked at number one on the Bubbling Under Hot 100 chart.)	RIAA: Gold	Non-album single
"Somebody Loves Me" (with Drake)	2025	27	97	—	—	—	—	—	—	—	27	MC: Platinum; RIAA: Gold	Some Sexy Songs 4 U
"Die Trying" (with Drake and Yebba)	2025	14	40	—	—	51	— (Note: "Die Trying" did not enter the NZ Top 40 Singles Chart, but peaked at number four on the NZ Hot Singles Chart.)	—	— (Note: "Die Trying" did not enter the Swedish Singellista Chart, but peaked at number 8 on the Swedish Heatseeker Chart.)	42	21	MC: 2× Platinum; RIAA: Gold; RMNZ: Platinum	Some Sexy Songs 4 U
"Some of Your Love"	2026	28	32	—	—	—	22	—	—	41	36		PartyNextDoor 3 (10-Year Edition)
"—" denotes a recording that did not chart or was not released in that territory.

=== As featured artist ===
List of singles as features artist, with selected chart positions, showing year released and album name
Title	Year	Peak chart positions										Certifications	Album
Title	Year	CAN	AUS	DEN	FRA	IRE	NZ	NOR	SWE	UK	US	Certifications	Album
"Preach" (Drake featuring PartyNextDoor)	2015	66	—	—	—	—	—	—	—	53	82	ARIA: Gold; BPI: Silver	If You're Reading This It's Too Late
"Run Up" (Major Lazer featuring PartyNextDoor and Nicki Minaj)	2017	20	27	23	16	25	14	27	23	20	66	BPI: Platinum; RMNZ: Platinum	Major Lazer Essentials
"Still Got Time" (Zayn featuring PartyNextDoor)	2017	22	—	—	36	30	32	—	39	24	66	MC: Platinum; BPI: Gold; RMNZ: Platinum	Icarus Falls
"One I Want" (Majid Jordan featuring PartyNextDoor)	2017	—	—	—	—	—	—	—	—	—	—	MC: Gold	The Space Between
"Nuh Ready Nuh Ready" (Calvin Harris featuring PartyNextDoor)	2018	83	—	—	—	76	— (Note: "Nuh Ready Nuh Ready" did not enter the NZ Top 40 Singles Chart, but peaked at number 7 on the NZ Heatseekers Chart.)	—	68	48	—		96 Months
"Twist & Turn" (Popcaan featuring Drake and PartyNextDoor)	2020	47	—	—	—	—	—	—	—	69	— (Note: "Twist & Turn" did not enter the Billboard Hot 100, but peaked at number 19 on the Bubbling Under Hot 100 Singles chart.)	BPI: Silver	Fixtape
"Make a Mall" (Preme featuring PartyNextDoor)	2021	—	—	—	—	—	—	—	—	—	—		Non-album singles
"No Fuss" (OG Parker featuring PartyNextDoor)	2022	—	—	—	—	—	—	—	—	—	—		Non-album singles
"Sex in the Porsche" (Diddy featuring PartyNextDoor)	2022	—	—	—	—	—	—	—	—	—	—		The Love Album: Off the Grid
"—" denotes a recording that did not chart or was not released in that territory.

== Other charted and certified songs ==
List of songs, with selected chart positions, showing year released and album name
Title	Year	Peak chart positions									Certifications	Album
Title	Year	CAN	AUS	FRA	IRE	NZ	SWE	UK	US	WW	Certifications	Album
"Welcome to the Party"	2013	—	—	—	—	—	—	—	—	—	RIAA: Gold	PartyNextDoor
"Right Now"	2013	—	—	—	—	—	—	—	—	—	MC: Gold	PartyNextDoor
"Break from Toronto"	2013	—	—	—	—	—	—	—	—	—	MC: 7× Platinum; BPI: Platinum; RIAA: 5× Platinum; RMNZ: 3× Platinum	PartyNextDoor
"TBH"	2013	—	—	—	—	—	—	—	—	—	BPI: Gold; MC: Platinum; RMNZ: Gold	PartyNextDoor
"Wus Good/Curious"	2013	—	—	—	—	—	—	—	—	—	MC: 2× Platinum; BPI: Silver; RIAA: Platinum; RMNZ: Gold	PartyNextDoor
"Belong to the City"	2014	—	—	—	—	—	—	—	—	—	MC: Platinum; BPI: Silver; RIAA: Platinum; RMNZ: Platinum	PartyNextDoor 2
"FWU"	2014	—	—	—	—	—	—	—	—	—	RIAA: Gold	PartyNextDoor 2
"Freak in You"	2014	—	—	—	—	—	—	—	—	—	MC: Platinum; RIAA: Platinum	Colours
"Wednesday Night Interlude" (Drake featuring PartyNextDoor)	2015	—	—	—	—	—	—	—	— (Note: "Wednesday Night Interlude" did not enter the Billboard Hot 100, but peaked at number nine on the Bubbling Under Hot 100 Singles chart.)	—		If You're Reading This It's Too Late
"With You" (Drake featuring PartyNextDoor)	2016	32	—	182	96	—	—	55	47	—	ARIA: Gold; BPI: Silver; RMNZ: Gold	Views
"Don't Run"	2016	—	—	—	—	—	—	—	—	—		PartyNextDoor 3
"Only U"	2016	94	—	—	—	—	—	—	—	—	MC: Platinum; RIAA: Gold	PartyNextDoor 3
"Don't Know How"	2016	—	—	—	—	—	—	—	—	—		PartyNextDoor 3
"Since Way Back" (Drake featuring PartyNextDoor)	2017	49	—	—	81	—	—	63	70	—		More Life
"Down for Life" (DJ Khaled featuring PartyNextDoor, Future, Travis Scott, Rick Ross and Kodak Black)	2017	—	—	—	—	—	—	—	— (Note: "Down for Life" did not enter the Billboard Hot 100, but peaked at number 25 on the Bubbling Under Hot 100 Singles chart.)	—		Grateful
"Peace of Mind"	2017	—	—	—	—	—	—	—	—	—	MC: Gold; RIAA: Gold	Colours 2
"Cash Out" (Calvin Harris featuring Schoolboy Q, PartyNextDoor and DRAM)	2017	94	—	—	67	— (Note: "Cash Out" did not enter the NZ Hot Singles Chart, but peaked at number one on the NZ Heatseeker Singles Chart.)	—	—	—	—		Funk Wav Bounces Vol. 1
"Damage" (featuring Halsey)	2017	81	—	—	—	—	—	—	—	—	MC: Gold	Seven Days
"Wouldn't Leave" (Kanye West featuring PartyNextDoor)	2018	24	33	153	27	21	—	—	24	—		Ye
"Ghost Town" (Kanye West featuring PartyNextDoor)	2018	21	22	146	24	14	100	17	16	—	IFPI DEN: Gold; BPI: Gold; RIAA: 2× Platinum	Ye
"Just Might" (Summer Walker featuring PartyNextDoor)	2019	—	—	—	—	—	—	—	— (Note: "Just Might" did not enter the Billboard Hot 100, but peaked at number one on the Bubbling Under Hot 100 Singles chart.)	—	BPI: Silver; RMNZ: Gold	Over It
"Nothing Less"	2020	—	—	—	—	—	—	—	—	—		Partymobile
"Trauma"	2020	—	—	—	—	—	—	99	—	—		Partymobile
"My Affection" (with Summer Walker)	2020	86	—	—	—	—	—	77	86	—		Life On Earth
"Persian Rugs"	2020	—	—	—	—	—	—	—	—	—	MC: Platinum; RIAA: Gold; RMNZ: Gold	Partypack
"Her Way"	2023	77	—	—	—	—	—	—	— (Note: "Her Way" did not enter the Billboard Hot 100, but peaked at number four on the Bubbling Under Hot 100 Singles chart.)	—	MC: 2× Platinum; BPI: Gold; RIAA: 2× Platinum; RMNZ: Platinum	PartyNextDoor Two
"Members Only" (Drake featuring PartyNextDoor)	2023	23	—	159	—	—	—	— (Note: "Members Only" did not enter the UK Singles Chart, as chart rules only allow three songs per artist to chart within the top one hundred at a time, but peaked at number 36 on the UK Streaming Chart.)	24	28		For All the Dogs
"Control"	2024	—	—	—	—	— (Note: "Control" did not enter the NZ Top 40 Singles Chart, but peaked at number twenty-three on the NZ Hot Singles Chart.)	—	—	—	—		PartyNextDoor 4
"Cheers"	2024	—	—	—	—	— (Note: "Cheers" did not enter the NZ Top 40 Singles Chart, but peaked at number twenty-four on the NZ Hot Singles Chart.)	—	—	—	—		PartyNextDoor 4
"Make It to the Morning"	2024	72	—	—	—	—	—	—	— (Note: "Make It to the Morning" did not enter the Billboard Hot 100, but peaked at number seven on the Bubbling Under Hot 100 Singles chart.)	—	MC: Platinum; BPI: Silver; RMNZ: Platinum; RIAA: Platinum	PartyNextDoor 4
"No Chill"	2024	—	—	—	—	—	—	73	— (Note: "No Chill" did not enter the Billboard Hot 100, but peaked at number seven on the Bubbling Under Hot 100 chart.)	—	MC: Platinum; RMNZ: Gold; RIAA: Platinum	PartyNextDoor 4
"For Certain"	2024	98	—	—	—	— (Note: "For Certain" did not enter the NZ Top 40 Singles Chart, but peaked at number sixteen on the NZ Hot Singles Chart.)	—	—	— (Note: "For Certain" did not enter the Billboard Hot 100, but peaked at number 13 on the Bubbling Under Hot 100 chart.)	—	MC: Platinum; BPI: Silver	PartyNextDoor 4
"CN Tower" (with Drake)	2025	13	38	—	—	— (Note: "CN Tower" did not enter the NZ Top 40 Singles Chart, but peaked at number five on the NZ Hot Singles Chart.)	—	22	18	26	MC: Gold; RIAA: Gold	Some Sexy Songs 4 U
"Moth Balls" (with Drake)	2025	24	68	—	—	—	—	—	29	38	MC: Gold	Some Sexy Songs 4 U
"Something About You" (with Drake)	2025	28	81	—	—	—	—	—	26	37	RIAA: Gold	Some Sexy Songs 4 U
"Spider-Man Superman" (with Drake)	2025	36	—	—	—	—	—	—	35	51	MC: Gold; RIAA: Gold	Some Sexy Songs 4 U
"Deeper"	2025	31	76	—	—	—	—	—	31	45	MC: Gold; RIAA: Gold	Some Sexy Songs 4 U
"Pimmie's Dilemma" (with Drake and Pim)	2025	41	—	—	—	—	—	—	45	57	MC: Gold	Some Sexy Songs 4 U
"Lasers" (with Drake)	2025	49	—	—	—	—	—	—	60	105		Some Sexy Songs 4 U
"Meet Your Padre" (with Drake and Chino Pacas)	2025	44	—	—	—	—	—	—	63	103		Some Sexy Songs 4 U
"Celibacy" (with Drake)	2025	55	—	—	—	—	—	—	66	132		Some Sexy Songs 4 U
"OMW" (with Drake)	2025	58	—	—	—	—	—	—	74	172		Some Sexy Songs 4 U
"Glorious" (with Drake)	2025	68	—	—	—	—	—	—	83	—		Some Sexy Songs 4 U
"When He's Gone" (with Drake)	2025	62	—	—	—	—	—	—	73	173		Some Sexy Songs 4 U
"Greedy" (with Drake)	2025	57	—	—	—	—	—	—	70	146		Some Sexy Songs 4 U
"Say What" (with Trippie Redd)	2026	—	—	—	—	—	—	—	— (Note: "Say What" did not enter the Billboard Hot 100, but peaked at number 10 on the Bubbling Under Hot 100 chart.)	—		NDA
"Routine Rouge"	2026	77	—	—	—	— (Note: "Routine Rouge" did not enter the NZ Top 40 Singles Chart, but peaked at number 3 on the NZ Hot Singles Chart.)	—	—	88	—		PartyNextDoor 3 (10-Year Edition)
"You Made It"	2026	—	—	—	—	— (Note: "You Made It" did not enter the NZ Top 40 Singles Chart, but peaked at number 19 on the NZ Hot Singles Chart.)	—	—	—	—		PartyNextDoor 3 (10-Year Edition)
"—" denotes a recording that did not chart or was not released in that territory.

== Guest appearances ==
List of non-single guest appearances, with other performing artists, showing year released and album name
Title	Year	Other artist(s)	Album
"Own It"	2013	Drake	Nothing Was the Same
"Come Thru"	2013	Drake	Nothing Was the Same
"Realest in the City"	2014	P Reign, Meek Mill	Dear America
"Nothing But Net"	2015	Travis Scott, Young Thug	—N/a
"Wednesday Night Interlude"	2015	Drake	If You're Reading This It's Too Late
"Routine Rouge"	2015	Rich the Kid, Ty Dolla Sign	Trap Talk
"Deserve It"	2015	Big Sean	Dark Sky Paradise
"Clique'd Up"	2015	King Louie	Drilluminati 3
"Stuck on Stacks"	2015	P Reign	Off the Books
"Truth for You"	2015	Amir Obe	Happening in the Grey Area
"I'm Good"	2015	Amir Obe	Happening in the Grey Area
"Sexually"	2016	Cash Out	—N/a
"Can't Let the Summer Pass"	2016	Murda Beatz	—N/a
"Cuffed Up"	2016	Quavo	—N/a
"Buzzin"	2016	Lil Yachty	—N/a
"Hot Sauce"	2016	Travis Scott, Quentin Miller	—N/a
"More"	2016	Murda Beatz, Quavo	Keep God First
"Since Way Back"	2017	Drake	More Life
"That's What I Like (PartyNextDoor Remix)"	2017	Bruno Mars	That's What I Like Remixes
"Run Up"	2017	Major Lazer, Nicki Minaj	Major Lazer Essentials
"Cash Out"	2017	Calvin Harris, ScHoolboy Q, DRAM	Funk Wav Bounces Vol. 1
"His Name Cassius"	2017	PeeWee LongWay	The Blue M&M 3
"Rain"	2017	Wiz Khalifa	Rolling Papers 2
"Back It Up"	2017	Roy Woods	Say Less
"Can't Hang"	2017	Preme	Light of Day
"I Need A Break"	2017	Young Chop, Chief Keef	King Chop 2
"Stamina" (Remix)	2017	Big Lean	—N/a
"Breather"	2018	Lil Durk, Ty Dolla Sign	Just Cause Y'all Waited
"They Don't"	2018	Reese	—N/a
"Leaning"	2018	Tory Lanez	The Bag EP
"More Than Friends"	2018	Tory Lanez	The Bag EP
"Wouldn't Leave"	2018	Kanye West	Ye
"Ghost Town"	2018	Kanye West	Ye
"On Ur Mind"	2018	Ne-Yo	Good Man
"1Night"	2018	Stargate, 21 Savage, Murda Beatz	—N/a
"No Shame"	2018	Future	Superfly
"Just Might"	2019	Summer Walker	Over It
"Wanna Be"	2019	French Montana	Montana
"Friends"	2020	Dvsn	A Muse in Her Feelings
"You Girl"	2020	Oliver El-Khatib	Autonomous Money Organization
"My Terms"	2020	DaniLeigh	Movie
"Fue Mejor"	2020	Kali Uchis	Sin Miedo (del Amor y Otros Demonios)
"Whole Lotta Liquor"	2020	Rubi Rose, Future	For The Streets
"Members Only"	2023	Drake	For All the Dogs
"Talk to Me Nice"	2023	Amir Obè	After.
"Party at Game's"	2026	The Game	The Documentary III

== Production discography ==
List of production (songwriting and arrangement) and non-performing songwriting credits (excluding guest appearances, interpolations, and samples)
Track(s)	Year	Credit	Artist(s)	Album
7. "Mi$$ion"	2012	Producer	Ty Dolla Sign	Beach House
All tracks	2013	Producer	PartyNextDoor	PartyNextDoor
All tracks	2014	Producer	PartyNextDoor	PartyNextDoor Two
All tracks	2014	Producer	PartyNextDoor	Colours
1. "Legend"	2015	Producer	Drake	If You're Reading This It's Too Late
9. "Preach"; (featuring PartyNextDoor)	2015	Producer	Drake	If You're Reading This It's Too Late
10. "Wednesday Night Interlude"; (featuring PartyNextDoor)	2015	Producer	Drake	If You're Reading This It's Too Late
13. Deserve It"; (featuring PartyNextDoor)	2015	Producer	Big Sean	Dark Sky Paradise
6. "Stuck on Stacks"; (featuring PartyNextDoor)	2015	Producer	P Reign	Off the Books
4. "Work"; (featuring Drake)	2016	Songwriter, additional vocals	Rihanna	Anti
16. "Sex with Me"	2016	Songwriter, additional vocals	Rihanna	Anti
10. "Waves"	2016	Songwriter	Kanye West	The Life of Pablo
3. "U With Me?"	2016	Songwriter	Drake	Views
1. "High Hopes"	2016	Producer	PartyNextDoor	PartyNextDoor 3
3. "Nobody"	2016	Producer	PartyNextDoor	PartyNextDoor 3
8. "Temptations"	2016	Producer	PartyNextDoor	PartyNextDoor 3
9. "Spiteful"	2016	Producer	PartyNextDoor	PartyNextDoor 3
10. "Joy"	2016	Co-producer (with 40 and Neenyo)	PartyNextDoor	PartyNextDoor 3
11. "You've Been Missed"	2016	Co-producer (with FWDSLXSH, Neenyo and Bizness Boi)	PartyNextDoor	PartyNextDoor 3
12. "Transparency"	2016	Producer (with Neenyo and Bizness Boi)	PartyNextDoor	PartyNextDoor 3
13. "Brown Skin"	2016	Producer (with 40)	PartyNextDoor	PartyNextDoor 3
14. "1942"	2016	Producer	PartyNextDoor	PartyNextDoor 3
16. "Nothing Easy to Please"	2016	Co-producer (with 40)	PartyNextDoor	PartyNextDoor 3
5. "Let Me"	2016	Producer (with David Gough)	Usher	Hard II Love
13. "Routine Rouge"; (with PartyNextDoor featuring Ty Dolla Sign)	2016	Producer	Rich the Kid	Trap Talk
2. "Shining"; (featuring Beyoncé and Jay-Z)	2017	Songwriter	DJ Khaled	Grateful
4. "Wild Thoughts"; (featuring Rihanna and Bryson Tiller)	2017	Songwriter	DJ Khaled	Grateful
All tracks	2017	Producer	PartyNextDoor	Colours 2
19. "Since Way Back"; (featuring PartyNextDoor)	2017	Producer (with G. Ry and 40)	Drake	More Life
1. "Bad Intentions"	2017	Producer	PartyNextDoor	Seven Days
6. "The Right Way"	2017	Producer (with Andrew Watt)	PartyNextDoor	Seven Days
3. "Keep Calm"	2017	Songwriter	Dvsn	Morning After
5. "Don't Choose"	2017	Songwriter, additional vocals	Dvsn	Morning After
2. "Goodlove"	2018	Songwriter, additional vocals	Justine Skye	Ultraviolet
6. "You Got Me"	2018	Songwriter, additional vocals	Justine Skye	Ultraviolet
10. "Come Thru"; (featuring the Weeknd)	2018	Songwriter	Trouble	Edgewood
5. "Takin' Shots"	2018	Co-producer (with Louis Bell and Prep Bijan), additional vocals	Post Malone	Beerbongs & Bentleys
10. "Hot Boy"; (featuring Lil Wayne)	2018	Songwriter, additional producer, additional vocals	Preme	Light of Day
4. "Maria"	2018	Songwriter	Christina Aguilera	Liberation
3. "LA Nights"	2018	Songwriter	Ne-Yo	Good Man
3. "Elevate"	2018	Producer (with Nonstop da Hitman)	Drake	Scorpion
Disc 2; 9. "Ratchet Happy Birthday"	2018	Songwriter	Drake	Scorpion
12. "Trap Star"	2018	Songwriter	City Girls	Girl Code
5. "Days In the East"	2019	Producer (with 40)	Drake	Care Package
10. "My Side"	2019	Songwriter	Drake	Care Package
3. "K-Town"	2019	Songwriter	Jay Park, Hit-Boy	This Wasn't Supposed to Happen
4. "Fade Away"	2019	Songwriter	Jay Park, Hit-Boy	This Wasn't Supposed to Happen
5. "Call You Bae"	2019	Songwriter	Jay Park, Hit-Boy	This Wasn't Supposed to Happen
6. "Killa"	2019	Songwriter	Jay Park, Hit-Boy	This Wasn't Supposed to Happen
1. "NOTHING LESS"	2020	Producer	PartyNextDoor	Partymobile
3. "The Blinding"; (featuring Travis Scott)	2020	Songwriter	Jay Electronica	A Written Testimony
15. "Fue Mejor"	2020	Songwriter	Kali Uchis, SZA	Sin Miedo (del Amor y Otros Demonios) (Deluxe)
20. "Fucking Fans"	2021	Producer (with Noel Cadastre and 40)	Drake	Certified Lover Boy
2. "West District"	2022	Producer (with 40)	PartyNextDoor	PartyPack
4. "Candy"; (featuring Nipsey Hussle)	2022	Producer	PartyNextDoor	PartyPack
1. "Ghetto Cinderella"; (featuring Mustard and Terrace Martin)	2023	Songwriter	Blxst	Just for Clarity 2
17. "Reachin'"; (featuring Ty Dolla Sign and Coco Jones)	2023	Songwriter	Diddy	The Love Album: Off the Grid
13. "Goals"	2024	Songwriter	French Montana, Jeremih	Mac & Cheese 5
2. "Lose My Mind"	2024	Co-producer (with 40, Prep Bijan, Travis Marsh and Eli Brown)	PartyNextDoor	PartyNextDoor 4
14. "Resentment"	2024	Co-producer (with Aliby)	PartyNextDoor	PartyNextDoor 4
2. "Moth Balls"	2025	Co-producer (with Prep Bijan, DJ Lewis, Aiona, O Lil Angel and Eli Brown)	PartyNextDoor, Drake	Some Sexy Songs 4 U
11. "Raining in Houston"	2025	Songwriter, additional vocals	Drake	Some Sexy Songs 4 U
13. "Mine"	2026	Songwriter, co-producer (with Boi-1da)	Jhené Aiko	Westside Whimsy
