= Colors 2 =

Colors 2 may refer to:

- Colours 2, 2017 EP by PartyNextDoor
- Colors II, 2021 album by Between the Buried and Me
