= Energy (Drake song) =

Single by Drake

from the album If You're Reading This It's Too Late
- Released: July 10, 2015
- Genre: Hip hop
- Length: 3:02
- Label: Cash Money
- Songwriters: Aubrey Graham; Matthew O'Brien; Marcus Jones II Matthew Samuels; Richard Dorfmeister; Markus Kienzi; Phillip Thomas
- Producers: Boi-1da; OB O'Brien

Drake singles chronology
"R.I.C.O." (2015)	"Energy" (2015)	"My Love" (2015)

Music video
- "Energy" on YouTube

"Energy" is the second single by Canadian rapper Drake from his commercial mixtape If You're Reading This It's Too Late. The single was released on July 10, 2015, about five months after the release of the mixtape.

== Composition ==
"Energy" contains samples from "Eazy-Duz-It" by Eazy-E and "Ridin' Spinners" by Three 6 Mafia. The song also samples the hook from the Hot Boys song I Need A Hot Girl, as well as the instrumental from the Original Concept song Knowledge Me. Energy was produced by Boi-1da and OB O'Brien. According to WhoSampled the song samples the score of an episode of The O.C.. The very first sample is believed to be of Jamaican DJ Jah Walton, likely recorded at a sound clash contest.

== Critical reception ==
Ryan Dombal of Pitchfork gave the song a positive review and named it "best new track", stating "The song isn't aimed to any rappers or pop stars, not Kendrick Lamar, Big Sean or Tyga, but the song lines are dangerous." Album Of The Year stated that the song became the most famous single to come out of If You're Reading This It's Too Late.

== Music video ==
=== Release ===
The video of "Energy" was released on Apple Music and users with iTunes and registered Apple Music account can watch this video.

=== Synopsis ===
The music video for "Energy" features Drake transformed into several notable celebrities, including: television personality Oprah Winfrey, during her famous interview with Tom Cruise; professional boxer Floyd Mayweather Jr.; singer Justin Bieber, from a Calvin Klein advertisement; singer Miley Cyrus, from her own music video for "Wrecking Ball"; former mayor of Toronto, Rob Ford, enjoying crack cocaine in an alley; entertainer Kanye West, during the filming of his own music video for "Bound 2"; United States President Barack Obama, during a presidential address; NBA player LeBron James; and O. J. Simpson, during the high speed car chase that led to his arrest. In each of these iterations, Drake mimes along with the song. Interspersed with these clips is monochromatic footage of Drake and his entourage; along with portraits of other caricatures. Bookending the video, a child version of Drake is seen in a field with other children, who act not unlike bullies towards him. At the end of the video, the young Drake stands solitary in the field, while another child (who has now been revealed to have Drake's adult face) points a toy gun at him.

=== Reception ===
Many critics stated that Drake uses this video to mock Justin Bieber, Miley Cyrus, Kanye West and many other celebrities in the video. However, each usage of a notable person is timed to emphasize a certain lyric within the song. None of the personalities parodied in the footage have publicly responded to the video for "Energy". Pitchfork Media named "Energy" the 12th best music video of 2015.

== Commercial performance ==
In Canada, "Energy" peaked at number 65 on the Billboard Canadian Hot 100. In the United States, it is the highest-charting song from the album to date, reaching number 26 on the Billboard Hot 100, number 9 on the Billboard Hot R&B/Hip Hop Songs chart and number 5 on the Billboard Rap chart. "Energy" also peaked at number 71 on the UK Singles Chart.

== Charts ==
Chart (2015–16)	Peak position
Australia (ARIA)	59
Canada (Canadian Hot 100)	53
France (SNEP)	196
UK Singles (Official Charts)	71
US Billboard Hot 100	26
US Hot R&B/Hip-Hop Songs (Billboard)	9

== Certifications ==
Region	Certification	Certified units/sales
Australia (ARIA)	2× Platinum	140,000^{‡}
Brazil (Pro-Música Brasil)	Platinum	60,000^{‡}
Denmark (IFPI Danmark)	Gold	45,000^{‡}
United Kingdom (BPI)	Gold	400,000^{‡}
United States (RIAA)	5× Platinum	5,000,000^{‡}
^{‡} Sales+streaming figures based on certification alone.
