= PartyNextDoor 4 =

Studio album by PartyNextDoor
- Released: April 26, 2024
- Recorded: 2016–2024
- Studios: JA Recording (Santa Rosa Valley); S.O.T.A. (Toronto)
- Genres: Alternative R&B, downtempo
- Length: 45:51
- Labels: Santa Anna; OVO
- Producers: PartyNextDoor; 40; Alex Lustig; Aliby; Bizness Boi; CandyChyld; Cardiak; Christopher Bivens; Eli Brown; G. Ry; Habib Defoundoux; Harv; Sharif Shannon; Hyprwrld; Instinct; Kddo; Maneesh; Niketaz; Niko; Nonstop Da Hitman; Nuki; OG Parker; Prep Bijan; Scandi; Travis Marsh

PartyNextDoor chronology
Partypack (2020)	PartyNextDoor 4 (2024)	Some Sexy Songs 4 U (2025)

Singles from PartyNextDoor 4
- 1. "Her Old Friends" Released: January 13, 2023; 2. "Resentment" Released: July 7, 2023; 3. "Real Woman" Released: March 15, 2024; 4. "Lose My Mind" Released: April 11, 2024

PartyNextDoor 4 (shortened to P4) is the fourth studio album by Canadian singer PartyNextDoor, released on April 26, 2024, through OVO Sound and the Santa Anna Label Group. Unlike his previous projects, the album features no guest appearances, however it features production from PartyNextDoor himself, 40, Cardiak and OG Parker, alongside others. It is his first album in four years since the release of Partymobile (2020), and marks the first installment of his eponymous album series in over seven years since PartyNextDoor 3 in 2016.

PartyNextDoor 4 (P4) was supported by four singles: "Her Old Friends", "Resentment", "Real Woman", and "Lose My Mind". The album received generally positive reviews from music critics and moderate commercial success. It debuted at number ten on the US Billboard 200 chart, earning 37,000 album-equivalent units in its first week.

== Release and promotion ==
PartyNextDoor released the album's first single, "Her Old Friends" on January 13, 2023. The album's second single, "Resentment" was released six months later on July 7, 2023. Under a year later, while teasing the release of the album, PartyNextDoor released a CCTV video for the track while setting the album for pre-order. This was followed by the release of the album's third single, "Real Woman" on March 15, 2024, alongside the album's official announcement. On April 2, Party officially released the album's NSFW artwork while confirming the album's release date. On April 11, Party released the album's final single, "Lose My Mind" before sharing the album's tracklist just a day prior to the album's release on April 25.

Upon the release of the album, Party released the official music video for "For Certain".

== Critical reception ==
Professional ratings
Review scores
Source	Rating
AllMusic	3/5 stars
Clash	8/10

Clash's Robin Murray wrote that the "whole project is cohesive" and that "each song speaks to the next" while describing the project as an "alluring document of salacious R&B titillation". Murray concluded that "the album closes on an oddly sombre note" and that PartyNextDoor 4 "taps into his core values".

=== Awards and nominations ===
Awards and nominations for PartyNextDoor 4
Organization	Year	Category	Result	Ref.
American Music Awards	2025	Favorite R&B Album	Nominated	

== Commercial performance ==
PartyNextDoor 4 (P4) debuted at number ten on the US Billboard 200 chart, earning 37,000 album-equivalent units in its first week. This became Party's third US top-ten debut. The album also accumulated a total of 45.94 million on-demand official streams from the set's songs. On November 17, 2025, the album was certified gold by the Recording Industry Association of America (RIAA) for combined sales and album-equivalent units of over 500,000 units in the United States.

== Track listing ==
PartyNextDoor 4 track listing
No.	Title	Writer(s)	Producer(s)	Length
1.	"Control"	Jahron Brathwaite; Noah Shebib; Carl McCormick; Alexander Lustig	Cardiak; 40^{[a]}; Alex Lustig^{[a]}	4:22
2.	"Lose My Mind"	Brathwaite; Earl Simmons; Shebib; David Hughes; Travis Marsh; Eliel Afari-Brown; Kasseem Dean	PartyNextDoor; 40; Prep Bijan; Marsh; Eli Brown	3:04
3.	"Stuck in My Ways"	Brathwaite; Maneesh Bidaye	Maneesh; 40; Lustig	3:00
4.	"Cheers"	Brathwaite; Joshua Parker; Andre Robertson; Christopher Bivens	OG Parker; Bizness Boi; Bivens; 40^{[a]}; Lustig^{[a]}	3:54
5.	"Make It to the Morning"	Brathwaite; Hughes; Habib Defoundoux; Nicola Kollar	Lustig; Defoundoux; Niketaz	2:48
6.	"No Chill"	Brathwaite; Gary Fountaine	Nonstop Da Hitman; Lustig^{[a]}	4:25
7.	"Her Old Friends"	Brathwaite; Parker; Jack Nilsson; Ryan Martinez; Konstatinos Latos	OG Parker; CandyChyld; G. Ry; Nuki Beats	4:16
8.	"The Retreat"	Brathwaite; Lustig	Lustig	0:47
9.	"For Certain"	Brathwaite; Parker; Ayoola Agboola	Lustig; OG Parker; Kddo; Maneesh^{[a]}	3:40
10.	"Sorry, But I'm Outside"	Brathwaite; Shebib; Muca Leonsio; Eric Vanacker; Tobias Rasmussen; Ryan Bridger	40; Niko; Instinct; Scandi; Hyprwrld	3:59
11.	"Real Woman"	Brathwaite; Shebib; Hughes; Eli Brown; Aaron Cheung; Vanessa Mukaremera	Prep Bijan; Brown; 40^{[a]}; Aaron Paris^{[a]}	3:15
12.	"A Mother's Prayer"	Brathwaite; Hughes	Prep Bijan	0:44
13.	"Family"	Brathwaite; Shebib; Lustig; Hughes; Robertson; Bernard Harvey	40; Lustig; Prep Bijan; Bizness Boi; Harv	3:53
14.	"Resentment"	Brathwaite; Peter Ring	PartyNextDoor; Aliby^{[a]}	3:44
Total length:				45:51

Notes

- ^{^[a]} signifies an additional producer
- All track titles are stylized in letter spaced. For example, "Control" is stylized as "C o n t r o l"

== Personnel ==
Musicians

- PartyNextDoor – vocals (all tracks), keyboards (14)
- Cardiak – keyboards (1)
- Layla Faith – skit vocals (1, 2, 4, 6, 8–10)
- Marian Gelani – skit vocals (1)
- Aaron Paris – violin (1, 3–6, 8–11, 13)
- Prep Bijan – keyboards (2, 11–13)
- Travis Marsh – keyboards (2)
- Eli Brown – keyboards (2, 11)
- Angelina Sherie – violin (2)
- Maneesh – keyboards (3)
- Wendy Clare – skit vocals (3, 12)
- OG Parker – keyboards (4, 7, 9)
- Bizness Boi – keyboards (4, 13)
- Christopher Bivens – keyboards (4)
- Habib Defoundoux – keyboards (5)
- Niketaz – keyboards (5)
- Nonstop Da Hitman – keyboards (6)
- G. Ry – keyboards (7)
- Nuki – keyboards (7)
- CandyChyld – keyboards (7)
- Alex Lusting – keyboards (8)
- Kddo – keyboards (9)
- Instinct – keyboards (10)
- Niko – keyboards (10)
- Hyprwrld – keyboards (10)
- Scandi – keyboards (10)
- Vanessa Mukaremera – additional vocals (11)
- 40 – keyboards (11)
- Harv – keyboards (13)
- Aliby – keyboards (14)

Technical

- Chris Athens – mastering (all tracks)
- Dave Huffman – mastering assistance (all tracks)
- Harrison Holmes – mastering assistance (1–6, 8–14)
- Prep Bijan – recording (1–13), mixing (1–13)
- PartyNextDoor – recording (14)
- 40 – mixing (all tracks)
- Oupsing – mixing assistance (all tracks)

== Charts ==
=== Weekly charts ===
Weekly chart performance for PartyNextDoor 4
Chart (2024)	Peak position
Australian Albums (ARIA)	62
Australian Hip Hop/R&B Albums (ARIA)	15
Belgian Albums (Ultratop Flanders)	90
Belgian Albums (Ultratop Wallonia)	117
Canadian Albums (Billboard)	13
Dutch Albums (Album Top 100)	82
New Zealand Albums (RMNZ)	26
Portuguese Albums (AFP)	38
Swiss Albums (Schweizer Hitparade)	14
UK Albums (Official Charts)	26
US Billboard 200	10
US Top R&B/Hip-Hop Albums (Billboard)	4

=== Year-end charts ===
Year-end chart performance for PartyNextDoor 4
Chart (2024)	Position
US Billboard 200	190
US Top R&B/Hip-Hop Albums (Billboard)	74
Chart (2025)	Position
Australian Hip Hop/R&B Albums (ARIA)	48

== Certifications ==
Certifications for PartyNextDoor 4
Region	Certification	Certified units/sales
Canada (Music Canada)	Gold	40,000^{‡}
New Zealand (RMNZ)	Gold	7,500^{‡}
United Kingdom (BPI)	Silver	60,000^{‡}
United States (RIAA)	Gold	500,000^{‡}
^{‡} Sales+streaming figures based on certification alone.

== Release history ==
Release dates and formats for PartyNextDoor 4
Region	Date	Label(s)	Format(s)	Edition(s)	Ref.
Various	April 26, 2024	Santa Anna; OVO Sound	Digital download; streaming	Standard	
Various	April 26, 2024	Santa Anna	LP	Standard	
