= Over Here =

Over Here may refer to:

- Over Here (TV series), a 1996 UK comedy-drama television serial
- Over Here!, a 1974 Broadway musical, as well as its title song
- "Over Here", a song by PartyNextDoor from the PartyNextDoor mixtape

== See also ==
- Over There (disambiguation)
