= 6 God =

6 God may refer to:

- Drake (musician) (born 1986), also known as the "6 God"
- "6 God", a song from the 2015 Drake mixtape If You're Reading This It's Too Late
