= Neenyo =

Canadian record producer and songwriter

- Also known as: Neenyo
- Born: Sean Seaton; Mississauga, Ontario, Canada
- Genres: R&B, Hip Hop
- Occupations: Record producer; songwriter
- Years active: 2006–present
- Labels: OVO Sound
- Website: www.neenyo.com

Sean Seaton, known professionally as Neenyo, is a Canadian record producer and songwriter. He is known for his works with Drake, PARTYNEXTDOOR as well as various artists including Future, Mr. Probz, blackbear, Jadakiss and Lloyd Banks.

== Life and career ==
Neenyo was born and raised in the Toronto suburb of Mississauga. His uncle is Howard Huges, a Canadian Hip-Hop producer. Neenyo began "DJ-ing" at home during his adolescent years when mixtapes were becoming popular. He then ventured into electronic infused R&B music.

Neenyo and PartyNextDoor grew up in the same neighborhood in Mississauga, Ontario, and they would later share their ideas and thoughts about music. Producing for Lloyd Banks' "Gang Green Season" and Dipset's "I’m Reloaded" in his early career helped him enter the American market. He later produced for Drake on his Comeback Season (mixtape) and made beats for many more, including Fabolous, Grafh, Red Café and Jadakiss. In 2009 Jadakiss's The Last Kiss album which he produced ranked #1 on Billboard's Top Rap Albums Chart. Since then he has worked with Akon, The Lox, Bobby Valentino, Collie Buddz and others. In 2015, Neenyo produced another song titled “Plastic Bag” for Drake and Future's platinum-selling What a Time to Be Alive project.

Neenyo works together with PARTYNEXTDOOR and collaborated with two studio albums: PartyNextDoor Two and PartyNextDoor 3. In P2 he produced two songs titled "Sex on the Beach" and "Grown Woman". On the other album his produced tracks are "You've Been Missed", "Transparency" and "Don't Know How". Both albums were released under the label of OVO Sound. He has also produced mixes for an installment of HYPETRAK’s ongoing mix series, i-D magazine and London based RinseFM 106.8

In March 2016, Neenyo collaborated with Canadian fashion designer Mikhael Kale, creating and producing the runway show for his fall-winter collection in Toronto Fashion Week.

== Music and production style ==
Neenyo mainly produces songs in the R&B and hip hop genre. He describes his style as “creating music off of emotions". In an interview given to Vice magazine, he mentions, "I don't think there's a song that I don't make an emotion out of because that's my whole goal for every song I do"

Neenyo has cited numerous influences on his music, including Timbaland, Noah “40” Shebib and Jodeci.

== Production discography ==
Release Date	Album	Artist	Song	Label
2006	Gang Green Season Starts Now	Lloyd Banks	"Gang Green Season"	
2007	Comeback Season	Drake (feat. Rich Boy)	"Must Hate Money"	October's Very Own
2008	Extinction: Last of a Dying Breed	Sheek Louch	"Til It's Gone"	Koch Entertainment
2008	Gangsta Grillz: The Album	DJ Drama & Fabolous	"Gettin' Money"	Grand Hustle, Atlantic
2008	The Oracle 2	Grafh (feat. D-Riley)	"Cha Ching"	
2009	Hottest In Da Hood	Red Café (feat. Maino)	"General"	ShakeDown, Konvict Muzik, Bad Boy
2009	The Last Kiss	Jadakiss (feat. Sheek Louch & S.I.)	"Come and Get Me"	D-Block, Ruff Ryders, Roc-A-Fella, Def Jam
2009	Dancer	Woodhands	"Dancer" Remix	
2009	Better Late Than Never	Trife Diesel (feat. Ghostface Killah)	"Respectfully"	Traffic Entertainment Group
2010	I'm Better Than You	Mickey Factz	"Trinity"	
2010	From the Bottom	Grafh (feat Mr. Probz & Raekwon)	"Cold Blackhand"	
2011	Singles	Big Page (feat. Bobby V)	"Gangsta Girl"	
2012	London Boy	Chip (feat. T.I. and Jeremih)	"R.N.F."	Grand Hustle
2012	The Golden Army	Vinny Chase	"Money"	Cheers Club Music
2012	Underrated	Bow Wow	"Boy or Girl"	Cash Money, Universal Republic
2013	The Treatment	Mr Probz	"Gold Days" "Hurdles"	Left Lane
2014	Singles	Collie Buddz	"Light It Up"	Sony Music
2014	PartyNextDoor Two	PartyNextDoor	"Sex on the Beach" "Grown Woman"	OVO Sound
2015	What a Time to Be Alive	Drake & Future	"Plastic Bag"	A1, Freebandz, Epic, Republic, Young Money, Cash Money, OVO Sound
2015	HYPETRAK Mix: Neenyo	VONTAYLOR; Honey Cocaine; FKA Twigs	"King Street" "Nate Dog" "Lights Off "	HYPETRAK
2015		PartyNextDoor	"Things and Such / Kehlani's Freestyle"	OVO Sound
2016	The Art of Hustle	Yo Gotti (feat. K. Michelle)	"My City"	Epic, CMG
2016	PartyNextDoor 3	PartyNextDoor	"Don't Know How" "Transparency" "You've Been Missed"	OVO Sound, Warner Bros.
2016		Elhae	"Claim"	Dream Loud/Atlantic Records
2016	TrapHouse Jodeci	Ye Ali (feat. Wes Period)	"Ammunition"	
2017	digital druglord	blackbear	"moodz" "hell is where i dreamt of u and woke up alone"	beartrap, UMG Recordings
2017	Colours 2	PartyNextDoor	"Freak in You"	OVO Sound, Warner Bros.
2017		Drake	"Freak in You Remix"	OVO Sound, Warner Bros.
2017		Omarion	"Lit"	Maybach Music Group, Atlantic
2017	Heartbreak on a Full Moon	Chris Brown	"Other Niggas"	RCA
2021	333	Tinashe	"Angels" (featuring Kaash Paige)	Tinashe Music

== Awards and recognition ==
Neenyo has consecutively produced on four #1 Billboard albums. Drake and Future's What A Time To Be Alive debuted #1 on Billboard's Top200 chart. It was also nominated for 2016 American Music Awards at Favorite Album (Rap/HipHop) category. PARTYNEXTDOOR's PartyNextDoor Two and P3 projects both debuted at #1 on Billboard's R&B Album chart. Jadakiss' The Last Kiss debuted at #1 on Billboard's HipHop/R&B Album chart.
