= Over There (disambiguation) =

"Over There" is a 1917 song popular with United States soldiers in both world wars.

Over There may also refer to:

- Over There (Australian TV series), a 1972 Australian drama-war television series
- Over There (American TV series), 2005 action-drama-war television series that aired on FX
- "Over There" (Fringe), the two-part second-season finale of the Fox science fiction drama series Fringe
- Over There (film), a 1917 American silent war drama film

== See also ==
- Over Here (disambiguation)
