= Amir Obè =

American rapper (born 1989)

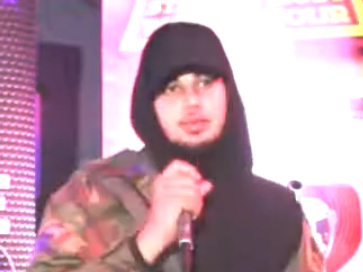
- Obé in 2017

Background information
- Also known as: Phreshy Duzit
- Born: Amir Obeid-Walker; August 26, 1989 (age 37); Detroit, Michigan, U.S.
- Origin: Sudan, Khartoum, S.D.
- Genres: Hip hop; R&B
- Occupations: Rapper; Singer; Songwriter; Producer
- Years active: 2009–present
- Labels: Neighborhood PHCK$; After Platinum; Atlantic; Def Jam
- Website: amirobemusic.com

Amir Obeid, known professionally as Amir Obè (born August 26, 1989), is an American rapper, singer-songwriter, and record producer who started his music career in 2009 as Phreshy Duzit and signed to Atlantic Records. He later left the label to reinvent his style and changed his name to Amir Obè and found his own collective Neighborhood PHCK$. Obè rose to fame by releasing the mixtape, Detrooklyn in 2014. In 2015, he released the EP, Happening in the Grey Area and then 2016's, Won't Find Love in the Hills. On December 1, 2016, Amir announced that he had signed a deal with Def Jam Recordings, and that an album is set to release sometime in 2017. His debut single on Def Jam, "Wish You Well" was released on March 9, 2017.

After a brief break in between releases, Amir announced and released a single titled IGNITE + GOODNIGHT through Def Jam Recordings, and eventually would release an EP titled before. On April 21, 2023, He would announce his debut album after. which would release on April 28, 2023. On April 2, 2025, He announced his second release “Looking for the Nearest Exit” which is scheduled to release April 25, 2025.

== Life and career ==
=== 1990–2012: Early life and career beginnings ===
Amir Obè was born in Detroit, then moved to New York City. His mother is Polish and a music teacher and his father is Sudanese. Obè's father listened to Michael Jackson growing up and was heavily influenced by Pharrell Williams and Kanye Obè played football in the street and rode his bike. During high school, he kept going back and forth from New York City to visit his sister. Obè played basketball in high school. He played one and two, point guard and shooting guard. He also played AAU, but in high school he was best offensive player in junior year and senior year.

When Obè was 16 or 17, he bought a computer mic and made song called, "Step Your Swag Up", which was his first. His parents didn't know he made music because he did it privately, but basketball was his main priority at the time. After high school, Obè started pursuing a music career and moved back to Brooklyn. Obè was first known as an artist when he went by the name of Phreshy Duzit on Myspace. He had about 100,000 fans and every week he kept releasing new freestyles and started seeing attention and getting messages from record labels. He eventually got signed to Atlantic Records. When Obè was 18, he made a friendship with PartyNextDoor on Twitter, who at the time went by "Jahron B". At that time, he was always songwriting and producing, so he'd always send him beats.

Obè released his debut EP, Brave New World on April 15, 2011, on Atlantic Records. The EP was entirely produced by NYLZ. Soon after, Obè left the label to revamp his style and described the record deal as "bullshit". On August 27, 2012, he released his debut mixtape, The New Religion on his own independent record label Neighborhood PHCK$ and After Platinum Records. It has guest appearances from Cory Gunz, Jon Connor, and Los and includes production from NYLZ, Daniel Worthy, Rich Flyer, and Obè himself. He revealed he got signed to After Platinum by releasing the mixtape.

=== 2014–17: Rise to fame and collaborations ===
Obè changed his name to Amir Obè in 2014 when he released the mixtape, Detrooklyn. The mixtape was released on After Platinum Records and included production from NYLZ, Vinylz, and Daniel Worthy. "I started feeling like both these places were the same place, so it was an imaginative project talking about my upbringing and my philosophies as an early teen 'till where I'm at now", says Obè. In the fall of 2014, Oliver El-Khatib (Drake's manager and co-founder of OVO Sound) spoke to Obè and told him Drake is a fan of Detrooklyn. Because of that, Obè sent him music and got positive feedback.

In February 2015, Obè co-produced, "Star67" for Drake, which appeared on If You're Reading This It's Too Late. Soon after, there was a rumor being passed around that Obè signed to OVO Sound, but he confirmed it wasn't true. Obè opened for PartyNextDoor on tour and the two collaborated on multiple songs. Obè released his second EP, Happening in the Grey Area on December 11, 2015. The album contains guest appearances from PartyNextDoor and Eli Sostre and includes production from NYLZ, The Mekanics, Daniel Worthy, Wondagurl, OZ and more. On March 11, 2016, Obè released his third EP, Won't Find Love in the Hills on Neighborhood PHCK$ and Empire Distribution. It has production from NYLZ, OZ, Eli Sostre, The Mekanics, STWO, and Ashton Mills. In late March 2016, AmirObèwas featured on Toronto R&B/Electro singer GOV's single Wrong One/Reflectin produced by frequent collaborator NYLZ and was the lead single from GOV's Nights EP which was premiered via Complex Magazine.

On December 1, 2016, AmirObèannounced his signing to Def Jam Records. In early 2017, Obèwas featured on Toronto based artist keffaleng's EP, "Not So Famous" on the Davinci produced single, "Yeah, Yeah".

Obè's "Wish You Well" is featured on the soundtrack for Madden NFL 18.

=== 2018-Present: Can't Be A ____ Here and after. ===
In 2018, Obè released a series of EP's titled Can't Be A ____ Here, all released through Def Jam Recordings, led by the single Holy Sh*t.

In July, 2020, Obè collaborated with producer Blitz//Berlin on the song Shadow which was featured in a trailer for the HBO series Lovecraft Country.

After three years without a release, Obè teased new music through a series of social media posts, eventually releasing his first single of 2023 titled IGNITE + GOODNIGHT, produced by longtime collaborator NYLZ. Soon after, he dropped his 8th extended play, titled before. which featured three tracks, as well as another appearance from PartyNextDoor. The title of this EP would foreshadow the title of his debut album, which he teased on April 22, titled after. which would release the following week.

== Discography ==
=== Studio albums ===
List of studio albums and selected album details
Title	Album details
after.	Released: April 28, 2023; Label: Def Jam; Format: digital download
Looking for the Nearest Exit	Released: April 25, 2025; Label: After Studios; Format: digital download

=== Extended plays ===
List of extended plays and selected album details
Title	Album details
Brave New World	Released: April 15, 2011; Label: Atlantic; Format: digital download
Happening in the Grey Area	Released: December 11, 2015; Label: Neighborhood PHCK$; Format: digital download
Won't Find Love in the Hills	Released: March 11, 2016; Label: Neighborhood PHCK$, EMPIRE; Format: digital download
None of the Clocks Work	Released: March 30, 2017; Label: Neighborhood PHCKS, Def Jam; Format: digital download
Can't Be A ____Here: Chapter 1	Released: August 28, 2018; Label: Def Jam; Format: digital download
Can't Be A ____Here: Chapter 2	Released: September 24, 2018; Label: Def Jam; Format: digital download
Can't Be A ____Here: Chapter 3	Released: December 4, 2018; Label: Def Jam; Format: digital download
before.	Released: April 14, 2023; Label: Def Jam; Format: digital download

=== Mixtapes ===
List of mixtapes and selected album details
Title	Album details
The New Religion	Released: August 27, 2012; Label: Neighborhood PHCK$, After Platinum; Format: digital download
Detrooklyn	Released: July 7, 2014; Label: After Platinum; Format: digital download

=== Singles ===
==== As lead artist ====
List of singles, showing year released and album name
Title	Year	Album
"Pattycake"	2010	—N/a
"HateLove"	2011	—N/a
"Jay Z, Kanye, Esco"	2014	Detrooklyn
"9 Milli"	2014	Detrooklyn
"Hennessy Breath"	2014	Detrooklyn
"Drugs & Cam'ron"	2014	Detrooklyn
"I'm Good" (featuring PartyNextDoor)	2015	Happening in the Grey Area
"Just Know"	2015	Happening in the Grey Area
"On a Ride"	2015	Happening in the Grey Area
"Say No More"	2015	Happening in the Grey Area
"Four Seasons Freestyle"	2015	—N/a
"Owe Me" (with Jimmy Prime)	2016	—N/a
"Before the Vomit"	2016	Won't Find Love in the Hills
"Wish You Well"	2017	None of the Clocks Work
"Holy Shit"	2018	—N/a

==== As featured artist ====
List of featured singles, showing year released and album name
Title	Year	Album
"Wrong One/Reflection" (Gov featuring Amir Obè)	2015	—N/a
"Lost in Detroit" (Previn Jones featuring Amir Obè and Doe Wright)	2015	—N/a
"I Got It" (Klepto Magz featuring Amir Obè)	2015	—N/a
