= Joseph Cotton =

Joseph or Joe Cotton may refer to:

- Joseph Cotton (mariner) (1746–1825), English mariner and merchant
- Joseph P. Cotton (1875–1931), American government official
- Joe Cotton (horse) (1882–?), American Thoroughbred racehorse
- Joseph R. Cotton (1890–1983), American jurist and politician in Massachusetts
- Joseph F. Cotton (1922–2016), U.S. Air Force test pilot
- Joseph Cotton (singer) (born 1957), Jamaican reggae singer
- Joe Cotton (born 1978), Canadian-born New Zealand pop singer
- Joe Cotton (rugby union) (born 1999), Australian rugby union player

== See also ==
- Joseph Cotten (1905–1994), American actor
