= PartyNextDoor Two =

Studio album by PartyNextDoor
- Released: July 29, 2014
- Recorded: 2013–14
- Genres: Alternative R&B; lofi; chillwave
- Length: 45:24
- Labels: OVO; Warner Bros.; WMGreen
- Producers: G. Ry; PartyNextDoor; Neenyo

PartyNextDoor chronology
PartyNextDoor (2013)	PartyNextDoor Two (2014)	Colours (2014)

Singles from PartyNextDoor Two
- 1. "Muse" Released: October 14, 2013; 2. "Her Way" Released: June 14, 2014; 3. "Recognize" Released: July 15, 2014

PartyNextDoor Two (stylized as PARTYNEXTDOOR TWO or P2) is the debut studio album by Canadian singer PartyNextDoor. It was released on July 29, 2014, by OVO Sound and Warner Bros. Records. The record was supported by the promotional singles: "Her Way" and "Recognize" featuring Drake, which were respectively released on June 13 and July 15, 2014.

== Background ==
On July 14, 2014, PartyNextDoor announced that PartyNextDoor Two would be released on July 29, 2014 in the United States; it serves as the follow-up to his debut extended play PartyNextDoor (2013). The record was made available for pre-order through the iTunes Store the following day.

== Critical reception ==
Professional ratings
Aggregate scores
Source	Rating
Metacritic	46/100
Review scores
Source	Rating
AllMusic	3/5 stars
Complex	3.5/5 stars
Exclaim!	(6/10)
Pitchfork	(6.8/10)
XXL	(L)

PartyNextDoor Two received mixed reviews from music critics. At Metacritic, which assigns a normalized rating out of 100 to reviews from mainstream publications, the album received an average score of 46, based on 5 reviews, which indicates "mixed or average reviews".

== Commercial performance ==
PartyNextDoor Two debuted at number 15 on the US Billboard 200 chart and number one on the US Top R&B Albumschart, selling 15,924 copies in its first week. On March 26, 2020, the album was certified gold by the Recording Industry Association of America (RIAA) for combined sales and album-equivalent units of over 500,000 units in the United States.

== Track listing ==
All tracks produced by PartyNextDoor, except for "SLS", additionally produced by G. Ry, "Sex on the Beach", produced by Neenyo, and "Grown Woman", additionally produced by Neenyo.

No.	Title	Writer(s)	Length
1.	"East Liberty"	Jahron Brathwaite; David Ainley	2:52
2.	"SLS"	Brathwaite; Ryan Martinez; Bobby Crawford; Jerome Lane; Keith Sweat	3:37
3.	"Sex on the Beach"	Brathwaite; Sean Seaton; Guy Lawrence; Howard Lawrence; Sam Smith; James Napier	3:49
4.	"Her Way"	Brathwaite	3:36
5.	"Belong to the City"	Brathwaite	1:38
6.	"Grown Woman"	Brathwaite; Seaton	3:25
7.	"FWU"	Brathwaite	4:55
8.	"Recognize" (featuring Drake)	Brathwaite; Aubrey Graham	5:11
9.	"Options"	Brathwaite	4:32
10.	"Thirsty"	Brathwaite; Melissa Elliott; Shawn Campbell; Cainon Lamb; Marshall Leathers	5:01
11.	"Bout It"	Brathwaite	3:25
12.	"Muse"	Brathwaite; Elgin Lumpkin; Timothy Mosley; Robert Reives	3:23
Total length:			45:24

Notes

- "Recognize" features background vocals by Bobby Chin and Willie Chin
- "Thirsty" features background vocals by Kalysha Adria Cain-Ling
- "FWU" is short for "Fuck With U"

Sample credits

- "East Liberty" contains a sample of "Know Where", as performed by Holy Other.
- "SLS" contains a sample of "Share My World", as performed by Dru Hill.
- "Sex on the Beach" contains samples of "Latch", written by Guy Lawrence, Howard Lawrence, Jimmy Napes, Sam Smith and Jimmy Napes, as performed by Disclosure.
- "FWU" contains a sample of "The Champ", as performed by The Mohawks.
- "Thirsty" contains a sample of "Ching-a-Ling", as performed by Missy Elliott.
- "Muse" contains a sample of "Only When Ur Lonely", as performed by Ginuwine.

== Personnel ==
Credits for PartyNextDoor Two adapted from AllMusic.

- Chris Athens – mastering
- Noel Cadastre – engineer
- Kalysha Adria Cain-Ling – background vocals
- Noel "Gadget" Campbell – mixing
- Bobby Chin – background vocals
- Willie Chin – background vocals
- Drake – featured artist
- Missy Elliott – composer
- Holy Other – composer
- Guy Lawrence – composer
- Howard Lawrence – composer
- Liam Macrae – photography
- Greg Morrison – mixing assistant
- Tim Mosley – composer
- Neenyo – drum programming, instrumentation, producer
- Nicky Orenstein – art direction, design
- PartyNextDoor – engineer, instrumentation, primary artist, producer
- Sean Seaton – composer, keyboards
- Noah "40" Shebib – engineer
- Sam Smith – composer
- Colin "Spenceselah" Spencer – mixing assistant
- Evan Stewart – assistant engineer
- Lindsay Warner – mixing assistant
- Chozen Williams – engineer

== Charts ==
=== Weekly charts ===
Chart (2014)	Peak position
Canadian Albums (Billboard)	19
UK Albums (Official Charts)	66
UK R&B Albums (Official Charts)	5
US Billboard 200	15
US Top R&B/Hip-Hop Albums (Billboard)	1

Chart (2025)	Peak position
Portuguese Streaming Albums (AFP)	173

=== Year-end charts ===
Chart (2014)	Position
US Top R&B/Hip-Hop Albums (Billboard)	83

== Certifications ==
Region	Certification	Certified units/sales
Canada (Music Canada)	Gold	40,000^{‡}
Denmark (IFPI Danmark)	Platinum	20,000^{‡}
United States (RIAA)	Platinum	1,000,000^{‡}
^{‡} Sales+streaming figures based on certification alone.

== Release history ==
Release dates and formats for PartyNextDoor Two
Region	Date	Label(s)	Format(s)	Edition(s)	Ref.
Various	July 29, 2014	OVO Sound; Warner	Digital download; streaming	Standard	
United States	October 27, 2014	OVO Sound; Warner	CD	Standard	
United States	December 15, 2014	OVO Sound; Warner	LP	Standard	
United States	July 26, 2024	Santa Anna	LP	Standard	
