= Loyal (PartyNextDoor song) =

Single by PartyNextDoor featuring Drake

from the album Partymobile
- Released: November 21, 2019
- Genre: Dancehall
- Length: 3:17
- Label: OVO; Warner
- Songwriter(s): Jahron Brathwaite; Aubrey Graham; Joshua Parker; D'Andre Moore-Jackson; Noah Shebib
- Producer(s): OG Parker; DreGotJuice; 40

PartyNextDoor singles chronology
"Nuh Ready Nuh Ready" (2018)	"Loyal" (2019)	"The News" (2019)

Drake singles chronology
"Ela É do Tipo" (2019)	"Loyal" (2019)	"Life Is Good" (2020)

"Loyal" is a song by Canadian singer PartyNextDoor featuring fellow Canadian rapper and singer Drake. It was released as the lead single from the former's third studio album Partymobile (2020) on November 21, 2019, by OVO Sound and Warner Records, alongside the release of "The News". The song was produced by OG Parker, DreGotJuice and 40. It reached the top 20 in Canada, the top 40 in the UK and number 63 on the US Billboard Hot 100. A remix featuring Puerto Rican rapper Bad Bunny was later released in February 2020.

== Critical reception ==
Charles Holmes of Rolling Stone judged that the song keeps PartyNextDoor's "tropical pop and drastic AutoTune vocal runs [...] intact, but there's also a new sense of sweetness". Jordan Darville of The Fader wrote that the track "combined PartyNextDoor's talent for the left-of-center with his impeccable pop instincts, which were boosted by a feature from Drake".

== Charts ==
=== Weekly charts ===
Chart (2019–2020)	Peak position
Australia (ARIA)	82
Belgium (Ultratip Bubbling Under Flanders)	35
Canada (Canadian Hot 100)	19
Ireland (IRMA)	60
New Zealand Hot Singles (RMNZ)	11
Portugal (AFP)	78
Sweden Heatseeker (Sverigetopplistan)	12
Switzerland (Schweizer Hitparade)	90
UK Singles (OCC)	31
US Billboard Hot 100	60
US Hot R&B/Hip-Hop Songs (Billboard)	25
US Rhythmic (Billboard)	10
US Rolling Stone Top 100	18

=== Year-end charts ===
Chart (2020)	Position
Canada (Canadian Hot 100)	90
US Rhythmic (Billboard)	44

== Certifications ==
Region	Certification	Certified units/sales
Canada (Music Canada)	3× Platinum	240,000^{‡}
New Zealand (RMNZ)	Gold	15,000^{‡}
Portugal (AFP)	Gold	5,000^{‡}
United Kingdom (BPI)	Gold	400,000^{‡}
United States (RIAA)	2× Platinum	2,000,000^{‡}
^{‡} Sales+streaming figures based on certification alone.
