= Recognize (song) =

Single by PartyNextDoor featuring Drake

from the album PartyNextDoor Two
- Released: July 15, 2014
- Recorded: 2014
- Genre: Trap; alternative R&B
- Length: 5:11
- Label: OVO; Warner
- Songwriters: Jahron Brathwaite; Aubrey Graham
- Producer: PartyNextDoor

PartyNextDoor singles chronology
| "Over Here" (2013) | "Recognize" (2014) | "Sex on the Beach" (2014) |

Drake singles chronology
| "0 to 100 / The Catch Up" (2014) | "Recognize" (2014) | "DnF" (2014) |

"Recognize" is a song by Canadian singer PartyNextDoor. It was released as his third single from his debut studio album, PartyNextDoor Two, on July 15, 2014. The song was produced by PartyNextDoor himself and features guest vocals from Canadian rapper Drake.

== Music video ==
The song's accompanying music video premiered on August 14, 2014 on PartyNextDoor's YouTube account. Since its release, the music video has received over 270 million views on YouTube.

== Charts ==
=== Weekly charts ===
| Chart (2014–15) | Peak position |
|---|---|
| US Bubbling Under Hot 100 (Billboard) | 3 |
| US Hot R&B/Hip-Hop Songs (Billboard) | 28 |

== Certifications ==
| Region | Certification | Certified units/sales |
|---|---|---|
| Canada (Music Canada) | 2× Platinum | 160,000^{‡} |
| New Zealand (RMNZ) | Platinum | 30,000^{‡} |
| United Kingdom (BPI) | Gold | 400,000^{‡} |
| United States (RIAA) | 4× Platinum | 4,000,000^{‡} |
^{‡} Sales+streaming figures based on certification alone.
