= Preach (Drake song) =

Single by Drake featuring PartyNextDoor

from the album If You're Reading This It's Too Late
- Released: March 29, 2015
- Genre: Hip hop
- Length: 3:56
- Label: Cash Money
- Songwriters: Aubrey Graham; Jahron Brathwaite; Alicia Augello-Cook; Kerry Brothers, Jr.; Edwin Jantunen; Noah Shebib
- Producer: PartyNextDoor

Drake singles chronology
"Blessings" (2015)	"Preach" (2015)	"100" (2015)

PartyNextDoor singles chronology
"Sex on the Beach" (2014)	"Preach" (2015)	"Things and Such" (2015)

Preach is a song by Canadian rapper Drake, featuring Canadian singer PartyNextDoor, from his commercial mixtape If You're Reading This It's Too Late. Released as the first book single from the mixtape on March 29, 2015, the song was well-received for its melodic production and emotive lyricism, reflecting themes of struggle, self-awareness, and loyalty. The track was produced by PartyNextDoor and features a guest verse from the artist.

== Composition ==
"Preach" is known for its moody, atmospheric production and its use of several samples, contributing to its introspective tone. The track incorporates a sample from the 2014 track "Unfaith" by DJ Ekali, a Canadian electronic producer. "Unfaith" also appeared in Wednesday Night Interlude, the 10th track on If You're Reading This It's Too Late, further connecting both songs within the mixtape. Additionally, "Preach" features a sample from "Stay," a track performed by American electronic artist Henry Krinkle, known for his minimalist approach to production. The collaboration of these samples creates a haunting soundscape that complements the song's reflective lyrics.

The song's lyrics explore themes of relationships, trust, and personal integrity, with both Drake and PartyNextDoor delivering verses that balance vulnerability with defiance. The blending of PartyNextDoor’s signature R&B style with Drake’s introspective rap lines gives the song a seamless fusion of hip hop and contemporary R&B.

== Lyrical Themes ==
"Preach" deals with the complications of loyalty and self-perception within relationships, both romantic and platonic. Drake’s verse focuses on his internal conflict as he reflects on personal growth and the evolution of his relationships. PartyNextDoor’s contribution adds an additional layer, with a focus on devotion and love. The track balances these contrasting emotions with its mellow production and understated vocal delivery, resulting in a track that resonates with listeners on a personal level.

== Commercial performance ==
Upon its release, "Preach" performed well commercially, charting in multiple regions. In Canada, the song peaked at number 66 on the Billboard Canadian Hot 100. It also made an impact in the United States, where it reached number 82 on the Billboard Hot 100 and number 27 on the Billboard Hot R&B/Hip-Hop Songs. The track also charted in the United Kingdom, reaching number 53 on the UK Singles Chart.

Although "Preach" did not achieve the same level of commercial success as some of Drake’s other singles, its strong presence on streaming platforms and its critical reception have made it a standout track from If You’re Reading This It’s Too Late, cementing its place as one of the mixtape’s defining songs.

== Charts ==
Chart (2015)	Peak position
Canada (Canadian Hot 100)	66
UK Singles (Official Charts)	53
US Billboard Hot 100	82
US Hot R&B/Hip-Hop Songs (Billboard)	27

== Certifications ==
Certifications for "Preach"
Region	Certification	Certified units/sales
Australia (ARIA)	Gold	35,000^{‡}
United Kingdom (BPI)	Silver	200,000^{‡}
^{‡} Sales+streaming figures based on certification alone.

== Critical reception ==
"Preach" received positive reviews from music critics, who praised its atmospheric production and the chemistry between Drake and PartyNextDoor. The song was highlighted for its introspective and melancholic tone, which aligned with the darker, more reflective nature of If You're Reading This It's Too Late. Music critics also noted that the song represented the evolution of Drake’s style, incorporating elements of R&B and electronic music with his usual blend of hip-hop lyricism. Critics praised the understated collaboration between the two artists, calling it one of the mixtape's standout moments.

== Music video ==
While a music video for "Preach" was never officially released, the song was heavily promoted through its association with If You’re Reading This It’s Too Late, a mixtape that received widespread attention. Various fan-made videos and visual interpretations of the track have circulated on social media, helping to maintain its popularity. The song's melancholic themes and its smooth, atmospheric production lent themselves well to visual interpretations, with many fans creating visual tributes to accompany the track.

== Legacy ==
Although "Preach" was not a chart-topping hit, its enduring popularity on streaming platforms and its status as a fan-favorite have solidified its place in Drake’s extensive catalog. The song’s introspective tone and its fusion of hip-hop and R&B elements contributed to the sound of If You’re Reading This It’s Too Late, an album that remains a key entry in Drake’s discography. Fans continue to express appreciation for the song, which has been featured in numerous playlists and is often regarded as one of the mixtape’s hidden gems.
