= Come and See Me =

Single by PartyNextDoor featuring Drake

from the album PartyNextDoor 3
- Released: March 23, 2016
- Recorded: 2016
- Genre: Alternative R&B
- Length: 3:55
- Label: OVO Sound; Warner
- Songwriters: Jahron Brathwaite; Noah Shebib; Aubrey Graham
- Producer: 40

PartyNextDoor singles chronology
"Things and Such" (2015)	"Come and See Me" (2016)	"Not Nice" (2016)

Drake singles chronology
"Summer Sixteen" (2016)	"Come and See Me" (2016)	"One Dance" (2016)

"Come and See Me" is a song by Canadian singer PartyNextDoor featuring Canadian rapper Drake, released as the lead single from the former's second studio album, PartyNextDoor 3 on March 23, 2016. The song was produced by frequent OVO Sound collaborator Noah "40" Shebib. "Come and See Me" has peaked at number 55 on the Billboard Hot 100, becoming PartyNextDoor's highest-charting single at the time. It received a nomination for Best R&B Song at the 59th Grammy Awards in February 2017. The song is featured in the NBA 2K17 soundtrack.

== Music video ==
A music video was released on June 23, 2016 directed by PartyNextDoor affiliate Adrian Martinez. The music video omits Drake's verse. It also features cameo appearances by American Hip Hop & R&B entertainers Big Sean and Jhené Aiko and reality television star Kylie Jenner appears as the main love interest.

== Remixes ==
Due to the songs' popularity off of the album, there have been many multiple, unofficial remixes and covers of the song recorded by many artists. An unofficial remix of the song was released on May 13, 2016 by American R&B artist Erykah Badu. On May 18, 2016, singer-songwriter SZA released her cover of the song titled "TwoAM". Another unofficial remix was released by American singers Trevor Jackson and Iyan Jay. on July 30, 2016. On August 2, 2016 American artist Lil' Mo released her remix of the song off of her SoundCloud account. January 4, 2017 Trey Songz and MIKExANGEL released a remix of the song on Trey's official SoundCloud account. Another unofficial remix was made by rappers PnB Rock and PnB Meen and was uploaded to PnB's SoundCloud account.

== Charts ==
=== Weekly charts ===
Chart (2016)	Peak position
Canada Hot 100 (Billboard)	73
France (SNEP)	129
UK Singles (Official Charts Company)	199
US Billboard Hot 100	55
US Hot R&B/Hip-Hop Songs (Billboard)	20
US R&B/Hip-Hop Airplay (Billboard)	2
US Rhythmic Airplay (Billboard)	21

=== Year-end charts ===
Chart (2016)	Position
US Hot R&B/Hip-Hop Songs (Billboard)	49

== Certifications ==
Region	Certification	Certified units/sales
Canada (Music Canada)	4× Platinum	320,000^{‡}
Denmark (IFPI Danmark)	Gold	45,000^{‡}
New Zealand (RMNZ)	2× Platinum	60,000^{‡}
Portugal (AFP)	Gold	5,000^{‡}
United Kingdom (BPI)	Platinum	600,000^{‡}
United States (RIAA)	7× Platinum	7,000,000^{‡}
^{‡} Sales+streaming figures based on certification alone.
