= Believe It (PartyNextDoor and Rihanna song) =

Single by PartyNextDoor and Rihanna

from the album Partymobile
- Released: March 27, 2020
- Genre: R&B
- Length: 3:00
- Label: OVO; Warner
- Songwriters: Jahron Brathwaite; Robyn Fenty; Andre Robertson; Carl McCormick; Eric Dugar; David Hughes; Desma Triplett
- Producers: Bizness Boi; Cardiak; Ninetyfour

PartyNextDoor singles chronology
"Split Decision" (2020)	"Believe It" (2020)	"Excitement" (2020)

Rihanna singles chronology
"Lemon" (2017)	"Believe It" (2020)	"Lift Me Up" (2022)

"Believe It" is a song by the Canadian singer PartyNextDoor and Barbadian singer Rihanna. It was released as the fourth single from PartyNextDoor's third studio album Partymobile on March 27, 2020, and was produced by Bizness Boi, Cardiak and Ninetyfour. The song marks Rihanna's first appearance on a single in three years, following N.E.R.D.'s "Lemon" (2017). The song debuted at number 12 on the UK Singles Chart and at number 23 on the Billboard Hot 100.

== Background ==
PartyNextDoor has previously co-written several songs with Rihanna, including "Work", "Sex with Me" and "Wild Thoughts".

== Writing and recording ==
American record producer Cardiak created the instrumental of the song, which features "intertwining guitar and [a] pitched-up vocal sample". He then sent it to his co-producer Bizness Boi, who was at a writing camp in Paris; despite working on the track with an unnamed artist, he passed it on to Ninetyfour, who fleshed the song out and sent it to PartyNextDoor upon the advice of a friend. PartyNextDoor put placeholder vocals from his girlfriend on the track while waiting to hear back from Rihanna. Rihanna finished her vocals in the week of the album's release. Bizness Boi and Ninetyfour did not hear Rihanna's finished vocals on the track until the album's release on March 27.

== Lyrics and composition ==
"Believe It" is a "sensual" R&B "slow burner" about a relationship, with PartyNextDoor and Rihanna singing to each other as lovers "imploring each other to believe in the power of their connection".

== Critical reception ==
Jessica McKinney of Complex included the song among their list of Best New Music of the week, calling it a "breezy R&B record" and noting how Rihanna takes a backseat to Party, "only offering raspy vocals on the chorus", singing, "Best make me believe it/Believe you won't deceive me".

== Charts ==
=== Weekly charts ===
Weekly chart performance for "Believe It"
Chart (2020)	Peak position
Australia (ARIA)	28
Austria (Ö3 Austria Top 40)	51
Belgium (Ultratip Bubbling Under Flanders)	15
Belgium (Ultratip Bubbling Under Wallonia)	11
Canada (Canadian Hot 100)	39
Canada CHR/Top 40 (Billboard)	18
Denmark (Tracklisten)	32
Estonia (Eesti Tipp-40)	35
France (SNEP)	48
Germany (GfK)	58
Ireland (IRMA)	16
Lithuania (AGATA)	26
Netherlands (Dutch Top 40 Tipparade)	8
Netherlands (Single Top 100)	53
New Zealand (Recorded Music NZ)	15
Norway (VG-lista)	29
Portugal (AFP)	25
Slovakia (Singles Digitál Top 100)	58
Spain (PROMUSICAE)	97
Sweden (Sverigetopplistan)	28
Switzerland (Schweizer Hitparade)	24
UK Singles (OCC)	12
US Billboard Hot 100	23
US Hot R&B/Hip-Hop Songs (Billboard)	12
US Pop Airplay (Billboard)	39
US Rhythmic Airplay (Billboard)	6

=== Year-end charts ===
2020 year-end chart performance for "Believe It"
Chart (2020)	Position
US Hot R&B/Hip-Hop Songs (Billboard)	75
US Rhythmic (Billboard)	36

== Certifications ==
Certifications for "Believe It"
Region	Certification	Certified units/sales
Brazil (Pro-Música Brasil)	Gold	20,000^{‡}
Canada (Music Canada)	Platinum	80,000^{‡}
Denmark (IFPI Danmark)	Gold	45,000^{‡}
New Zealand (RMNZ)	2× Platinum	60,000^{‡}
Portugal (AFP)	Gold	5,000^{‡}
United Kingdom (BPI)	Platinum	600,000^{‡}
United States (RIAA)	2× Platinum	2,000,000^{‡}
^{‡} Sales+streaming figures based on certification alone.

== Release history ==
Release dates for "Believe It"
Region	Date	Format	Label	Ref.
Various	March 27, 2020	Digital download; streaming	OVO Sound	
United States	March 31, 2020	Contemporary hit radio	OVO Sound	
United States	March 31, 2020	Rhythmic contemporary	OVO Sound	
United States	March 31, 2020	Urban contemporary	OVO Sound	
