= Seven Days (EP) =

EP by PartyNextDoor
- Released: September 29, 2017
- Recorded: 2017
- Genre: R&B
- Length: 28:25
- Labels: OVO; Warner Bros.
- Producers: Andrew Watt; Bijan Amir; Cardiak; Cassius Jay; Dez Wright; Frank Dukes; G. Ry; Msimp; PartyNextDoor; Prep; T-Minus

PartyNextDoor chronology
Colours 2 (2017)	Seven Days (2017)	Partymobile (2020)

Seven Days is the fourth extended play by Canadian recording artist PartyNextDoor. It was released on September 28, 2017, by OVO Sound and Warner Bros. Records. The EP features two guest appearances from Halsey and Rick Ross.

== Background ==
The concept of the EP was detailed during an interview with Zane Lowe. The EP was made in just seven days, according to PartyNextDoor. The tracklist was teased with individual tracks, with the last track premiering on Beats 1 Radio.

== Track listing ==
Seven Days
No.	Title	Writer(s)	Producer(s)	Length
1.	"Bad Intentions"	Jahron Brathwaite	PartyNextDoor	4:14
2.	"Never Played Me"	Brathwaite; Carl McCormick; Dylan Cleary-Krell	Cardiak; Dez Wright	4:09
3.	"Damage" (with Halsey)	Brathwaite; Ashley Frangipane; Adam Feeney; Tyler Williams	Frank Dukes; T-Minus	3:33
4.	"Better Man" (featuring Rick Ross)	Brathwaite; Ryan Martinez; David Hughes; William Roberts	G. Ry; Prep Bijan	4:37
5.	"Best Friends"	Brathwaite; Joshua Cross	Cassius Jay	3:53
6.	"The Right Way"	Brathwaite; Andrew Wotman	Andrew Watt; PartyNextDoor	4:41
7.	"Love Me Again"	Brathwaite; Bijan Amirkhani; Michael Simpson	Bijan Amir; M.simp	3:18
Total length:				28:25

== Personnel ==
Performers

- PartyNextDoor – primary artist
- Halsey – featured artist (track 3)
- Rick Ross – featured artist (track 4)

Technical

- David Hughes – recording engineer (all tracks)
- Chris Athens – mastering engineer (all tracks)
- Dave Huffman – mastering engineer (all tracks)
- Jaycen Joshua – mixing engineer (all tracks)
- Ben Milchev – assistant mixing engineer (all tracks)
- David Nakaji – assistant mixing engineer (all tracks)

Production

- PartyNextDoor – producer (tracks 1, 6)
- Cardiak – producer (track 2)
- Dez Wright – producer (track 2)
- Frank Dukes – producer (track 3)
- T-Minus – producer (track 3)
- G. Ry – producer (track 4)
- Prep Bijan – producer (track 4 )
- Cassius Jay – producer (track 5)
- Andrew Watt – producer (track 6)
- Bijan Amir – producer (track 7)
- M.simp – producer (track 7)

== Charts ==
Chart (2017)	Peak position
Canadian Albums (Billboard)	28
US Billboard 200	82
US Top R&B/Hip-Hop Albums (Billboard)	44
