= PartyNextDoor (mixtape) =

Mixtape by PartyNextDoor
- Released: July 1, 2013
- Genre: Alternative R&B, vaporwave
- Length: 28:33
- Label: OVO; Warner
- Producer: 40; PartyNextDoor

PartyNextDoor chronology
PartyNextDoor (2013)	PartyNextDoor Two (2014)

Singles from PartyNextDoor
- 1. "Make a Mil" Released: April 22, 2013; 2. "Wus Good / Curious" Released: May 13, 2013; 3. "Over Here" Released: June 22, 2013

PartyNextDoor is the self-titled debut mixtape by Canadian singer PartyNextDoor. It was released on July 1, 2013, by OVO Sound and Warner Records. The production on the album was completely handled by PartyNextDoor himself with additional production from 40. The album also contains a sole guest appearance from Drake.

== Promotion ==
PartyNextDoor was initially promoted through a series of posts on Canadian rapper Drake's October’s Very Own blog, the official OVO Sound blog. These posts included SoundCloud posts of material later used on PartyNextDoor including "Make a Mil" and "Wus Good/Curious". These songs were further promoted on Twitter by both Drake and the official October’s Very Own account. The album’s release date was announced, again via the October’s Very Own blog, on June 20, 2013.

PartyNextDoor appeared on the North American leg of Drake’s Would You Like a Tour?, marking his first tour. Vinyl and CD copies of PARTYNEXTDOOR were available for sale exclusively at the October’s Very Own merchandise booth at all Would You Like a Tour? shows. The official video for "Break From Toronto" was released on 23 October 2013 and PARTYNEXTDOOR's official Vimeo page.

== Reception ==
Professional ratings
Review scores
Source	Rating
Earmilk	9.0/10
Pitchfork	6.9/10

Though receiving few critical reviews, and with relatively little promotion, PartyNextDoor's release sold 2,000 copies in its first week, placing it at number six on the Billboard Heatseekers Albums chart and number 34 on the Top R&B/Hip-Hop Albums chart.

== Track listing ==
All tracks are produced by PartyNextDoor, except for "Over Here", produced with 40.

PartyNextDoor track listing
No.	Title	Writer(s)	Length
1.	"Welcome to the Party"	Jahron Brathwaite; Derwin Dicker	1:54
2.	"Wild Bitches"	Brathwaite; Chris Laufman	3:35
3.	"Relax with Me"	Brathwaite	2:47
4.	"Right Now"	Brathwaite; Seth Haley	4:03
5.	"Make a Mil"	Brathwaite	2:51
6.	"Break from Toronto"	Brathwaite; Miguel Pimentel	1:39
7.	"TBH"	Brathwaite	2:03
8.	"Wus Good / Curious"	Brathwaite; Alexei Mohajerjasbi; Kelsey Bulkin	3:32
9.	"Over Here" (featuring Drake)	Brathwaite; Aubrey Graham; Noah Shebib; Anthony Palman	2:57
10.	"Ballin'"	Brathwaite	3:12
Total length:			28:38

Sample credits

- "Welcome to the Party" contains elements of "Before We Talked", written and performed by Gold Panda.
- "Wild Bitches" contains elements of "Loud Mouths", written and performed by Wise Blood.
- "Right Now" contains elements from "Hyperlips", written and performed by Com Truise.
- “Break From Toronto” contains elements of "Girl with the Tattoo Enter.lewd", written and performed by Miguel.
- “Wus Good / Curious” contains elements of "Chatoyant", written by Sabzi and Kelsey Bulkin, and performed by Made In Heights.

== Personnel ==
Credits for PartyNextDoor from PartyNextDoor official Facebook page.

- Marc-Olivier Bouchard – mastering
- Noel Cadastre – engineer
- Noel "Gadget" Campbell – mixing
- PartyNextDoor – engineer, primary artist, producer
- Paolo Azarraga – photography

== Charts ==
Chart performance for PartyNextDoor
Chart (2013)	Peak position
US Billboard Heatseekers Albums	6
US Top R&B/Hip-Hop Albums (Billboard)	34

== Certifications ==
Certifications for PartyNextDoor
Region	Certification	Certified units/sales
United States (RIAA)	Platinum	1,000,000^{‡}
^{‡} Sales+streaming figures based on certification alone.
