= Colours 2 =

EP by PartyNextDoor
- Released: June 2, 2017
- Genre: Alternative R&B
- Length: 17:37
- Labels: OVO; Warner Bros.
- Producers: PartyNextDoor; G. Ry; 40; M3rge; Neenyo; OZ; TOPFLR; Wallis Lane

PartyNextDoor chronology
PartyNextDoor 3 (2016)	Colours 2 (2017)	Seven Days (2017)

Colours 2 (stylized in all caps) is the third extended play by Canadian recording artist PartyNextDoor. It was released on June 2, 2017, by OVO Sound and Warner Bros. Records. This is the sequel to his previous EP, Colours (2014) and following 2016's PartyNextDoor 3 album.

== Background ==
The EP was recorded within a span of five days.

== Track listing ==
Colours 2
No.	Title	Writer(s)	Producer(s)	Length
1.	"Peace of Mind"	Jahron Brathwaite; Ozan Yildirim; Ryan Martinez	G. Ry; PartyNextDoor; OZ^{[a]}	5:03
2.	"Freak in You"	Brathwaite; Michael Surio; Noah Shebib; Martinez; Sean Seaton	G. Ry; Neenyo; TOPFLR; 40^{[b]}	4:32
3.	"Low Battery"	Brathwaite; Marques Hutchison; Surio; Martinez	G. Ry; PartyNextDoor; M3rge; TOPFLR	4:31
4.	"Rendezvous"	Brathwaite; Nima Jahanbin; Paimon Jahanbin; Martinez	G. Ry; Wallis Lane; PartyNextDoor	3:31

Notes

- ^{^[a]} signifies a co-producer
- ^{^[b]} signifies an additional producer

== Short film ==
Rather than unveiling separate videos or individual music videos for each track on the EP, Party chose to astonish listeners and fans with a single short film, unveiled on June 12, 2017, showcasing snippets from all four records.

== Personnel ==
Performers

- PartyNextDoor – primary artist

Technical

- David Hughes – recording engineer (all tracks)
- Chris Athens – mastering engineer (all tracks)
- Dave Huffman – mastering engineer (all tracks)
- Noel Campbell – mixing engineer (all tracks)

Production

- G. Ry – producer (tracks 1, 2, 3, 4)
- PartyNextDoor – producer (tracks 1, 3, 4)
- OZ – co-producer (track 1)
- Neenyo – producer (track 2)
- Top FLR – producer (tracks 2, 3)
- 40 – additional producer (track 2)
- M3rge – producer (track 3)
- Wallis Lane – producer (track 4)
