= PartyNextDoor =

Canadian singer (born 1993)

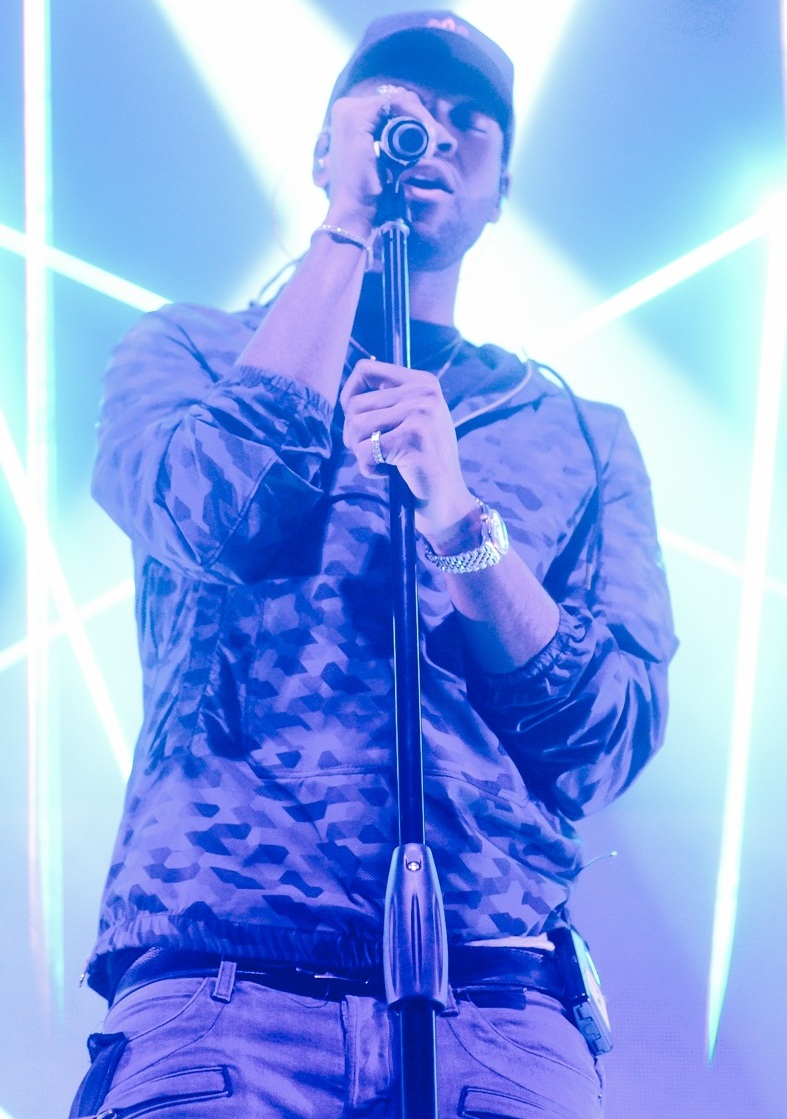
- PartyNextDoor performing in 2016

Background information
- Born: Jahron Anthony Brathwaite; July 3, 1993 (age 33); Mississauga, Ontario, Canada
- Origin: Toronto, Ontario, Canada
- Genres: Alternative R&B; hip hop; R&B; dancehall
- Occupations: Singer; songwriter; record producer
- Works: Discography; production
- Years active: 2006–present
- Labels: OVO Sound; Sony Music; Warner
- Website: partyomo.com

Jahron Anthony Brathwaite (born July 3, 1993), known professionally as PartyNextDoor (stylized in all caps, colloquially abbreviated as PND), is a Canadian singer, songwriter, and record producer. He was the first artist to sign with Drake's record label OVO Sound, an imprint of Warner Records, in 2013. His self-titled debut mixtape was released through the label in July that year, and met with critical praise.

His debut studio album, PartyNextDoor Two (2014), was supported by the single "Recognize" (featuring Drake), which received quadruple platinum certification by the Recording Industry Association of America (RIAA). His second album, PartyNextDoor 3 (2016), peaked at number three on the Billboard 200, while spawning his first Canadian Hot 100 and Billboard Hot 100 entries with its singles "Come and See Me" (featuring Drake) and "Not Nice". His third album, Partymobile (2020), matched the chart position of its processor; it spawned the single "Believe It" (with Rihanna), which became his first to enter the Billboard Hot 100's top 40. His fourth album, PartyNextDoor 4 (2024), was followed by his collaborative album with label boss Drake, Some Sexy Songs 4 U (2025), which became his first to debut atop both the Billboard Canadian Albums and Billboard 200.

Outside of recording, PartyNextDoor has been active in production and songwriting for other artists. He was credited on Rihanna's 2016 single "Work" and DJ Khaled's 2017 single "Wild Thoughts", which peaked at numbers one and two on the Billboard Hot 100, respectively. PartyNextDoor has also contributed to releases by Kanye West, Usher, Christina Aguilera, Post Malone, City Girls, Ne-Yo, Justine Skye, and Jay Park, among others.

== Early life ==
Jahron Anthony Brathwaite was born on July 3, 1993, in Mississauga, Ontario. His father is of Trinidadian descent while his mother is of Jamaican descent. Growing up in the Church, Brathwaite sung in the Church choir, alongside his mother, which he cites as his music roots. Brathwaite began to produce music in his bedroom while in high school reaching out to record labels and creative directors who didn't see his vision as an artist, pushing him to learn to produce his music. Brathwaite attended Applewood Heights Secondary School before dropping out at 16 years old to move to Los Angeles to pursue his music career. Brathwaite began to post music under the alias Jahron B. to his Myspace account. At the time, all of his living costs were funded by his manager while he would receive $50 every two weeks from his mother to pay for groceries.

== Career ==
=== 2006–2015: Career beginnings and debut album ===
Having made electronic-infused R&B under his real name Jahron B, he signed a publishing deal with Warner/Chappell as a songwriter, under the name PartyNextDoor, at age 18. His first mixtape, PartyNextDoor, was released to the iTunes Store on July 1, 2013. It entered on the Billboard Heatseekers Albums chart at number six with sales of 2,000 copies and peaked at number 34 on the Top R&B/Hip-Hop Albums chart for the week of July 20, 2013. He performed background vocals on "Own It" and "Come Thru" from Drake's third studio album, Nothing Was the Same.

His debut studio album PartyNextDoor Two was released on July 30, 2014. The record featured singles like "Her Way", "FWU", "East Liberty" and the Billboard charted "Recognize", featuring Drake. Later that year, on December 3, 2014, PartyNextDoor released the four-track EP titled PNDColours, with the follow-up Colours 2 released in 2017. In 2015, he produced three songs on Drake's If You're Reading This It's Too Late: "Legend", "Preach" and "Wednesday Night Interlude".

=== 2016–2020: PartyNextDoor 3, Partymobile and Partypack ===
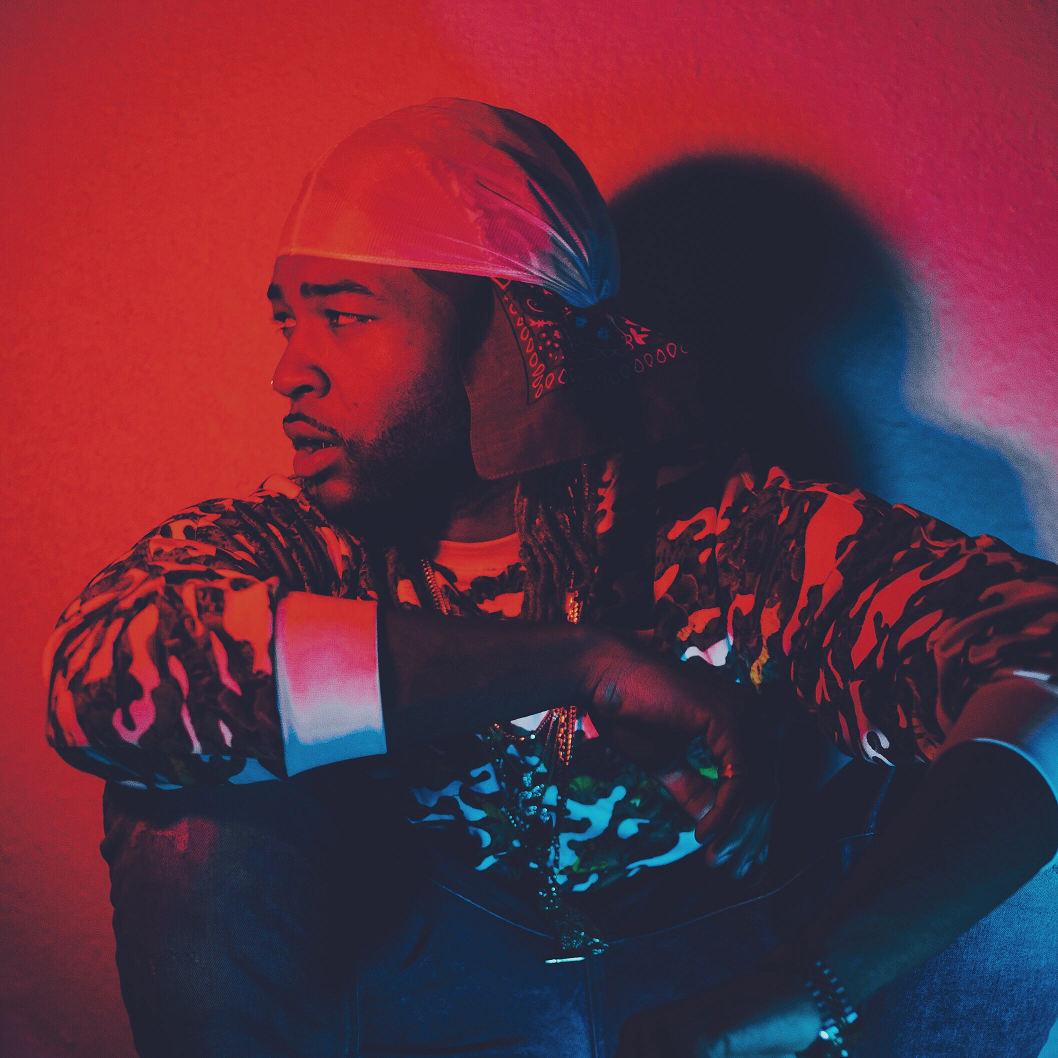
PartyNextDoor in 2016

PartyNextDoor earned his first number-one song as a songwriter when on January 27, 2016, Rihanna released the lead single "Work" from her eighth studio album, Anti. The song maintained its spot at number-one on the Billboard Hot 100 for nine consecutive weeks. He also penned the song "Sex with Me" on the same album. On March 25, 2016, PartyNextDoor released "Come and See Me", which features fellow artist Drake, from his upcoming second studio album, PartyNextDoor 3 (also known as P3). A music video directed by affiliate and collaborator Adrian Martinez and featuring appearances by Kylie Jenner, Big Sean, and Jhené Aiko was released on Snapchat on June 23, 2016. On June 15, 2016, Jeremih called into Real 92.3 LA to announce a joint album with PartyNextDoor called Late Night Party. On July 2, 2016, he released another single, "Like That", featuring Jeremih and Lil Wayne, on OVO Sound radio. On July 21, 2016, PartyNextDoor announced the release date for his second studio album PartyNextDoor 3 for August 12, 2016, and released "Not Nice", the record's second single.

He and Jeremih toured in 2016 and had plans to release a joint project.

On June 4, 2017, PartyNextDoor released Colours 2 without any prior announcement. Additionally, instead of releasing separate videos for each of the EP's individual records, Party opted to surprise listeners and fans by sharing a single short film released on June 12, 2017 featuring snippets from all four records.

On September 29, 2017, he released an EP titled Seven Days, which included guest appearances from Halsey and Rick Ross.

After a lead artist hiatus, PartyNextDoor returned in December 2019 with two singles "The News" and "Loyal", with the latter featuring Drake. They served as the lead singles of his album Partymobile which he tweeted would be released in February. In February 2020, he released a remix of “Loyal” featuring Bad Bunny alongside Drake’s original feature. The album was eventually released on March 27, 2020, following delays.

On October 15, 2020, Party surprise-announced the release of Partypack, a seven-song EP containing previously unreleased songs like the 2014 song "Persian Rugs". The EP was released the following day.

=== 2021–present: PartyNextDoor 4 and Some Sexy Songs 4 U ===
On January 29, 2021, Party released his 2014 EP, Colours, to streaming services for the first time. It includes four extra tracks that were previously released as Colours 2 in 2017.

On October 6, 2023, PartyNextDoor appeared as a guest appearance on "Members Only", the fourteenth cut of Drake's For All the Dogs. The track debuted at #24 on the Billboard Hot 100, marking Party's third entry on the chart.

On April 26, 2024, PartyNextDoor released his highly-anticipated studio album, PartyNextDoor 4 which debuted at number 13 on the Canadian Albums Chart and number 10 on the Billboard 200, moving 37,000 copies in its first week. The album was preceded by four singles: "Her Old Friends", "Resentment", "Real Woman", and "Lose My Mind". Following the release of the album, PartyNextDoor embarked on his twenty-four date, Sorry, I’m Outside tour in Canada and the United States. The tour was later extended to the United Kingdom and Europe, adding fifteen dates.

On November 4, 2024, PartyNextDoor released his 2015 single "Dreamin" after much anticipation without prior announcement due to a copyright issue, though previously mentioning that the song would never be released.

On February 3, 2025, PartyNextDoor and Drake announced the release of their collaborative studio album, Some Sexy Songs 4 U, which was released on February 14. It peaked at number one at the Billboard 200, his first number-one album on the chart.

On August 21, 2026, PartyNextDoor released a 10-year anniversary edition of PartyNextDoor 3, adding three previously unreleased tracks: “Some of Your Love”, “Routine Rouge”, and “You Made It”.

== Artistry ==
=== Influences ===
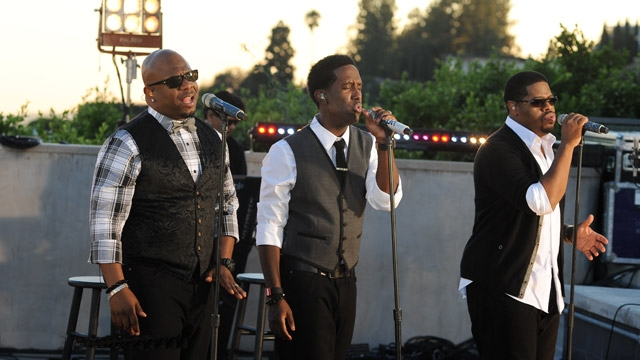
Brathwaite has credited DeVante Swing, Mr. Dalvin, K-Ci, and JoJo of Jodeci (left) and Nathan Morris, Shawn Stockman, Wanyá Morris of Boyz II Men (right) as being his earliest musical influences.

Brathwaite has credited Jodeci, Boyz II Men, Blackstreet, 112, and NSYNC as his earliest musical influences. During his interview with The Fader, he revealed that those were the primary artists that his father would play around him, stating, "Slim from 112 is part of the reason why I pitched up my music, because he sounded so young when he was getting older". However, Brathwaite's newer music is influenced heavily from Caribbean-influenced dancehall music.

=== Musical style ===
Brathwaite’s music often covers the topics of relationships and sex, usually consisting of "drug use, screwed-up vocals, [and] gloomy sax riffs". In his interview with The Fader, he revealed that at the time of his come-up, the music coming out of Toronto "were darker at the time", pushing him to flip the darkness, stating that he's "all about colours". He noted that he would "flip samples where one's a completely dark song and the next one is a complete sexual song".

== Discography ==
Studio albums

- PartyNextDoor Two (2014)
- PartyNextDoor 3 (2016)
- Partymobile (2020)
- PartyNextDoor 4 (2024)

Collaborative albums

- Some Sexy Songs 4 U (with Drake) (2025)

== Tours ==
=== Headlining ===
- Infinity Tour (2018)
- Sorry, I'm Outside Tour (2024)
- Wireless Festival (with Drake) (2025)
- TouchGrass Music Festival (2026)

=== Co-headlining ===
- Summer's Over Tour (with Jeremih) (2016)
- Some Special Shows 4 U (with Drake) (2025)

=== Supporting ===
- Hopeless Fountain Kingdom Tour (Halsey) (2017-2018)

== Awards and nominations ==
Year	Awards	Category	Nominated work	Result
2016	Mobo Awards	Best International Act	Himself	Nominated
2017	Grammy Awards	Best R&B Song	"Come and See Me" (with Drake)	Nominated
2017	Grammy Awards	Album of the Year	Views (as a featured artist)	Nominated
2017	MTVU Woodie Awards	Songwriter of the Year	Himself	Won
2017	Juno Awards	R&B/Soul Recording of the Year	PartyNextDoor 3	Nominated
2017	Canadian Radio Music Awards	Best New Group or Solo Artist: Dance/Urban/Rhythmic	"Not Nice"	Nominated
2017	Billboard Music Awards	Top R&B Collaboration	"Come and See Me" (with Drake)	Nominated
2017	iHeartRadio Much Music Video Awards	Best New Canadian Artist	Himself	Won
2017	Secret Genius Awards	Secret Genius: R&B	Himself	Won
2024	The Black Academy	Artist of the Year	Himself	Won
2024	iHeartRadio Much Music Video Awards	TikTok Bop of the Year	Her Way	Nominated
2024	NMPA	Top Artist-Songwriter	Himself	Won
2025	American Music Awards	Favorite R&B Album	PartyNextDoor 4	Nominated
2025	American Music Awards	Favorite R&B Album	Some Sexy Songs 4 U	Nominated
2025	BET Awards	Album of the Year	Some Sexy Songs 4 U	Nominated
2025	BET Awards	Best Group	Himself and Drake	Nominated
2026	Grammy Awards	Best Melodic Rap Performance	"Somebody Loves Me" (with Drake)	Nominated
2026	Soul Train Music Awards	Spotify's RNB X International Artist	Himself	Pending
