= Partymobile =

Studio album by PartyNextDoor
- Released: March 27, 2020
- Length: 56:24
- Labels: OVO; Warner
- Producers: PartyNextDoor; 40; Alex Lustig; Andrew Cedar; Asoteric; Bizness Boi; Burns; Cardiak; Danny Wolf; DreGotJuice; Ekzakt; Hoskins; Murda Beatz; Ninetyfour; OG Parker; OZ; Prep Bijan; T3K; Zaro Vega

PartyNextDoor chronology
Seven Days (2017)	Partymobile (2020)	Partypack (2020)

Singles from Partymobile
- 1. "Loyal" Released: November 22, 2019; 2. "The News" Released: November 22, 2019; 3. "Split Decision" Released: February 28, 2020; 4. "Believe It" Released: March 27, 2020

Partymobile is the third studio album by Canadian singer PartyNextDoor. It was released on March 27, 2020, by OVO Sound and Warner Records. It features guest appearances from Drake, Rihanna, and Bad Bunny.

== Release and promotion ==
In November 2019, PartyNextDoor announced his fourth studio album would be released in January 2020. The album's release was then pushed back to February. The album was delayed for a second time before being released to streaming services on March 27, 2020 as a mixtape.

== Commercial performance ==
Partymobile debuted at number eight on the US Billboard 200 chart, earning 50,000 album-equivalent units in its first week. This became Party's second US top-ten debut.

== Critical reception ==
Professional ratings
Review scores
Source	Rating
AllMusic	3.5/5 stars
Euphoria Magazine	3.8/5 stars
Exclaim!	6/10
HipHopDX	3.7/5
Pitchfork	4.9/10
The Times	2/5 stars

Partymobile received mixed reviews from music critics. Adrienne Harmony from Exclaim! noted, "beyond these, though, there's a lot on Partymobile that simply comes and goes. A surprising turn for such a memorable artist." Scott Glaysher from HipHopDX rated Partymobile a 3.7 out of 5, stating, "as society gets deeper into this unprecedented quarantine, the masses will have more time on their own to sit and long for intimate relationships and Party's isolation anthems are a source of solace."

== Track listing ==
Credits adapted from Tidal.

Partymobile track listing
No.	Title	Writer(s)	Producer(s)	Length
1.	"Nothing Less"	Jahron Anthony Brathwaite; Carl McCormick; Shane Lindstrom	Cardiak; Murda Beatz	3:29
2.	"Turn Up"	Brathwaite; McCormick; Lindstrom; Ini Kamoze	Cardiak; Murda Beatz	3:29
3.	"The News"	Brathwaite; Andre Robertson; Jon Hoskins	Bizness Boi; Hoskins	4:27
4.	"Split Decision"	Brathwaite; Alexander Lustig	Alex Lustig	3:06
5.	"Loyal" (featuring Drake)	Brathwaite; Aubrey Graham; Joshua Parker; D'Andre Moore-Jackson; Noah Shebib	OG Parker; DreGotJuice; 40	3:17
6.	"Touch Me"	Brathwaite; Eliot Dubock; Ozan Yildirim	Beat Bucha; OZ	3:47
7.	"Trauma"	Brathwaite; Matthew Burns; John Mitchell	Burns	2:51
8.	"Showing You"	Brathwaite; Miguel Curtidor; Zach Perry; David Hughes	Danny Wolf; Ekzakt; Prep Bijan	4:47
9.	"Eye On It"	Brathwaite; Anton Kuehl-Joergensen; Lazaro Valenzuela	Asoteric; Zaro Vega	3:33
10.	"Believe It" (with Rihanna)	Brathwaite; Robyn Fenty; Robertson; McCormick; Eric Dugar; Hughes; Desma Triplett	Bizness Boi; Cardiak; Ninetyfour	3:03
11.	"Never Again"	Brathwaite; Lustig; Shebib	Alex Lustig	3:53
12.	"PGT"	Brathwaite; Dominique Laing; Luke Crowder; Rafael Brown	Bvtman	3:13
13.	"Another Day"	Brathwaite; McCormick; Lindstrom	Cardiak; Murda Beatz	2:32
14.	"Savage Anthem"	Brathwaite; Andrew Cedar; Jason Boyd; Shebib	Cedar; 40	6:16
15.	"Loyal" (remix featuring Drake and Bad Bunny)	Brathwaite; Graham; Benito Martínez; Moore-Jackson; Parker; Shebib	OG Parker; DreGotJuice; 40	4:41
Total length:				56:24

Notes

- ^{^[a]} signifies a co-producer
- "Savage Anthem" features additional vocals by Poo Bear

== Charts ==
=== Weekly charts ===
Weekly chart performance for Partymobile
Chart (2020)	Peak position
Australian Albums (ARIA)	22
Austrian Albums (Ö3 Austria)	38
Belgian Albums (Ultratop Flanders)	14
Belgian Albums (Ultratop Wallonia)	48
Canadian Albums (Billboard)	3
Danish Albums (Hitlisten)	14
Dutch Albums (Album Top 100)	17
Estonian Albums (Eesti Tipp-40)	24
French Albums (SNEP)	29
German Albums (Offizielle Top 100)	56
Irish Albums (Official Charts)	29
Italian Albums (FIMI)	74
Lithuanian Albums (AGATA)	18
New Zealand Albums (RMNZ)	27
Norwegian Albums (VG-lista)	8
Swedish Albums (Sverigetopplistan)	18
Swiss Albums (Schweizer Hitparade)	19
UK Albums (Official Charts)	7
US Billboard 200	8
US Top R&B/Hip-Hop Albums (Billboard)	4

=== Year-end charts ===
Year-end chart performance for Partymobile
Chart (2020)	Position
US Top R&B/Hip-Hop Albums (Billboard)	92

== Certifications ==
Certifications for Partymobile
Region	Certification	Certified units/sales
Canada (Music Canada)	Platinum	80,000^{‡}
New Zealand (RMNZ)	Gold	7,500^{‡}
United States (RIAA)	Gold	500,000^{‡}
^{‡} Sales+streaming figures based on certification alone.

== Release history ==
Release dates and formats for Partymobile
Region	Date	Label(s)	Format(s)	Edition(s)	Ref.
Various	March 27, 2020	OVO Sound; Warner	Digital download; streaming	Standard	
United States	July 8, 2020	OVO Sound; Warner	LP	Standard	
