= PartyNextDoor 3 =

Studio album by PartyNextDoor
- Released: August 12, 2016
- Length: 65:43
- Labels: OVO; Warner Bros.
- Producers: PartyNextDoor (also exec.); 40 (also exec.); Baba Stiltz; Boi-1da; Bizness Boi; Neenyo; FWDSLXSH; G.Ry; Illangelo; L8 Show; Neenyo; Nineteen85; Sevn Thomas; Supa Dups; Varg

PartyNextDoor chronology
Colours (2014)	PartyNextDoor 3 (2016)	Colours 2 (2017)

Singles from PartyNextDoor 3
- 1. "Come and See Me" Released: March 23, 2016; 2. "Not Nice" Released: July 22, 2016; 3. "Only U" Released: 2016

PartyNextDoor 3 (also stylized as PX3) is the second studio album by Canadian singer PartyNextDoor. It was released on August 12, 2016, by OVO Sound and Warner Bros. Records. The album was supported by two singles: "Come and See Me" featuring Drake, and "Not Nice". On August 21, 2026, a 10-year anniversary edition of the album was released, adding three previously unreleased tracks: “Some of Your Love”, “Routine Rouge”, and “You Made It”.

== Singles ==
The album's first single, "Come and See Me" was released digitally on the iTunes Store and Apple Music on March 23, 2016. The song features guest vocals from the fellow Canadian rapper and label-mate Drake, with production that was provided by 40.

The album's second single, "Not Nice" was released digitally as the pre-order for the album on the iTunes Store and Apple Music on July 22, 2016, and later sent to radio as the second official single. The track was also co-written by Drake, with the production that was provided by 40, Illangelo, Supa Dups and Nineteen85.

"Don't Know How" was released on the iTunes Store and Apple Music as the first promotional single on August 5, 2016. The song was produced by Bizness Boi and Neenyo.

== Critical reception ==
Professional ratings
Aggregate scores
Source	Rating
Metacritic	69/100
Review scores
Source	Rating
AllMusic	3/5 stars
XXL	(L)
The Guardian	3/5 stars

PartyNextDoor 3 received positive reviews from music critics. At Metacritic, which assigns a normalized rating out of 100 to reviews from mainstream publications, the album received an average score of 69, based on eight reviews, indicating "generally favorable reviews". Writing for Exclaim!, Ryan B. Patrick praised the album's "on point" production but criticized PartyNextDoor's tendency to "get lost in his own haze of vulnerabilities".

== Commercial performance ==
PartyNextDoor 3 debuted at number three on the US Billboard 200, earning 50,000 album equivalent units with 29,000 copies in pure album sales in its first week of release. On January 22, 2019, the album was certified gold by the Recording Industry Association of America (RIAA) for combined sales and album-equivalent units of over 500,000 units in the United States.

== Track listing ==
Credits adapted from AllMusic.

No.	Title	Writer(s)	Producer(s)	Length
1.	"High Hopes"	Jahron Brathwaite; Lucy Walters	PartyNextDoor; Varg	7:22
2.	"Don't Run"	Brathwaite; Rupert Thomas, Jr.; Aubrey Graham; Lucas Stiltz; Andre Robertson; Christian Patey	Sevn Thomas; L8 Show^{[a]}; Baba Stiltz^{[b]}; Bizness Boi^{[b]}	4:03
3.	"Nobody"	Brathwaite; Olubowale Akintimehin	PartyNextDoor	4:10
4.	"Not Nice"	Brathwaite; Paul Jefferies; Dwayne Chin-Quee; Carlo Montagnese; Noah Shebib; Aubrey Graham; Andrew Hershey; Azim Palmer	Nineteen85; Supa Dups^{[a]}; Illangelo^{[a]}; 40^{[b]}	3:22
5.	"Only U"	Brathwaite; Matthew Samuels	Boi-1da	2:55
6.	"Don't Know How"	Brathwaite; Robertson	Bizness Boi	2:54
7.	"Problems & Selfless"	Brathwaite; Ryan Martinez	G. Ry	3:37
8.	"Temptations"	Brathwaite	PartyNextDoor	2:43
9.	"Spiteful"	Brathwaite	PartyNextDoor	5:35
10.	"Joy"	Brathwaite; Shebib; Sean Seaton; Devendra Banhart	40; PartyNextDoor; Neenyo^{[b]}	3:15
11.	"You've Been Missed"	Brathwaite; Yinka Bankole-Ojo; Seaton; Robertson	FWDSLXSH; Neenyo; Bizness Boi^{[b]}; PartyNextDoor^{[b]}	4:00
12.	"Transparency"	Brathwaite; Seaton; Robertson	PartyNextDoor; Neenyo^{[b]}; Bizness Boi^{[b]}	3:50
13.	"Brown Skin"	Brathwaite; Shebib	40; PartyNextDoor	3:58
14.	"1942"	Brathwaite	PartyNextDoor	5:41
15.	"Come and See Me" (featuring Drake)	Brathwaite; Shebib; Graham	40	3:55
16.	"Nothing Easy to Please"	Brathwaite; Shebib	40; PartyNextDoor	4:23
Total length:				65:43

10-Year edition track listing
No.	Title	Writer(s)	Producer(s)	Length
17.	"Some of Your Love"	Brathwaite; Jordan Evans; Jordon Manswell; J'vell Boyce; Jean-Jacques Debout	Jordan Evans; Jordon Manswell; J'vell Boyce	2:39
18.	"Routine Rouge"	Brathwaite; Edward Murray	PartyNextDoor; Sledgren	3:08
19.	"You Made It"	Brathwaite	Jordan Evans; Matthew Burnett; Jordon Manswell	3:05
Total length:				74:36

Notes

- ^{^[a]} signifies a co-producer
- ^{^[b]} signifies an additional producer

== Charts ==
=== Weekly charts ===
Chart (2016)	Peak position
Australian Albums (ARIA)	13
Belgian Albums (Ultratop Flanders)	24
Belgian Albums (Ultratop Wallonia)	68
Canadian Albums (Billboard)	4
Dutch Albums (Album Top 100)	24
French Albums (SNEP)	79
New Zealand Albums (RMNZ)	14
Swiss Albums (Schweizer Hitparade)	36
UK Albums (Official Charts)	11
US Billboard 200	3
US Top R&B/Hip-Hop Albums (Billboard)	1

Chart (2026)	Peak position
Portuguese Streaming Albums (AFP)	200

=== Year-end charts ===
Chart (2016)	Position
US Billboard 200	187
US Top R&B/Hip-Hop Albums (Billboard)	65

== Certifications ==
Region	Certification	Certified units/sales
Canada (Music Canada)	Platinum	80,000^{‡}
New Zealand (RMNZ)	Gold	7,500^{‡}
United States (RIAA)	Gold	500,000^{‡}
^{‡} Sales+streaming figures based on certification alone.

== Release history ==
Release dates and formats for PartyNextDoor 3
Region	Date	Label(s)	Format(s)	Edition(s)	Ref.
Various	August 12, 2016	OVO Sound; Warner	Digital download; streaming	Standard	
United States	September 30, 2016	OVO Sound; Warner	CD	Standard	
United States	January 27, 2017	OVO Sound; Warner	LP	Standard	
