= If You're Reading This It's Too Late =

Mixtape by Drake
- Released: February 13, 2015
- Studios: Chozen; The Hazelton; S.O.T.A. (Toronto); The New York Palace (New York City); Sandra Gale Studio (Yolo Estate, California)
- Genre: Hip hop
- Length: 68:38
- Labels: OVO; Young Money; Cash Money; Republic
- Producers: 40; Boi-1da; Eric Dingus; Jimmy Prime; MostHigh; Nylz; PartyNextDoor; Syk Sense; WondaGurl

Drake chronology
Nothing Was the Same (2013)	If You're Reading This It's Too Late (2015)	What a Time to Be Alive (2015)

Singles from If You're Reading This It's Too Late
- 1. "Preach" Released: March 29, 2015; 2. "Energy" Released: July 10, 2015

If You're Reading This It's Too Late is the fourth mixtape by Canadian rapper Drake. It was surprise released on February 13, 2015 through OVO Sound, Young Money, Cash Money and Republic Records. The mixtape was primarily produced by Drake's longtime collaborators Boi-1da and 40, with additional production contributed by OVO signee PartyNextDoor, among others. Features include PartyNextDoor, Travis Scott, and Lil Wayne.

If You're Reading This It's Too Late received positive reviews and debuted atop the US Billboard 200, moving 535,000 album-equivalent units its first week. This achievement marked Drake's fourth time at the top of the chart. The mixtape also broke Spotify's first-week streaming record with over 17.3 million streams in the first three days. It was previously held by Drake himself, with his album Nothing Was the Same (2013), with 15.146 million streams in the first week. The album was nominated for Best Rap Album at the 2016 Grammy Awards. In 2020, the album was ranked 367th on Rolling Stone's updated list of the 500 Greatest Albums of All Time.

== Background ==
In July 2014, Drake announced the title of his fourth studio album to be Views from the 6, upon which recording had reportedly not begun in session. In November 2014, in an interview, Toronto Raptors basketball player DeMar DeRozan mentioned that Drake was intending to release a mixtape in January 2015. On February 12, 2015, Drake released a short film titled Jungle, which featured snippets of new songs such as "Know Yourself" and "Jungle".

In an interview with HipHopDX, DatPiff founder Kyle Reilly revealed that Drake was initially in talks to release If You're Reading This It's Too Late as a free download on DatPiff hosted by DJ Drama, before Cash Money Records intervened. Due to its release via digital download outlets such as iTunes and Amazon Music as well as physically in vinyl and CD formats, contractually it is considered his fourth studio album for Cash Money Records. The album's cover art was done by Canadian artist Jim Joe.

== Release and promotion ==
On February 12, 2015, the album was posted as an iTunes link from Drake's Facebook. It also was uploaded to OVO Sound's official SoundCloud account, but was quickly removed. It was released onto the iTunes Store on February 13, 2015, by Cash Money Records.

Drake hinted on his Instagram account of an alternate version of the project by DJ Candlestick and hosted by OG Ron C, titled If You're Choppin' This It's Too Late. This version was later released on April 14. The physical version of the album was also released on April 21, with two bonus tracks "How About Now" and "My Side" in stores as "collector's edition".

== Critical reception ==
Professional ratings
Aggregate scores
Source	Rating
AnyDecentMusic?	7.4/10
Metacritic	78/100
Review scores
Source	Rating
AllMusic	3.5/5 stars
The A.V. Club	B−
The Daily Telegraph	4/5 stars
Entertainment Weekly	B+
The Guardian	4/5 stars
Los Angeles Times	3/4 stars
NME	6/10
Pitchfork	8.3/10
Rolling Stone	4/5 stars
Spin	7/10

If You're Reading This It's Too Late was met with generally positive reviews. At Metacritic, which assigns a normalized rating out of 100 to reviews from mainstream publications, the mixtape received an average score of 78, based on 33 reviews. Aggregator AnyDecentMusic? gave it 7.4 out of 10, based on their assessment of the critical consensus.

Tim Sendra of AllMusic said, "It makes for an album that's hard to love right away, but if you stick with it, is a rewarding listen." Evan Rytlewski of The A.V. Club said, "Drake may not have an hour's worth of great songs here, but he does have an hour's worth of thoughts he needs to get off his chest." Neil McCormick of The Daily Telegraph said, "Drake is amongst the most musically and lyrical progressive proponents of his chosen medium, bringing a level of educated artiness and psychological self-awareness to a genre too often reliant on big beats and braggadocio." Kyle Anderson of Entertainment Weekly said, "Late is hardly a throwaway. In fact, it might be his most consistently rewarding full-length yet." Eric Zaworski of Exclaim! praised the release's production, writing that it "revels in the hazy drone of the 'Toronto Sound' that OVO's 40 and Boi-1da helped define, with offerings from up-and-comers like Brampton's WondaGurl and PRIME's Eric Dingus rounding it out." Paul Lester of The Guardian said, "the former child TV star comes out fighting, amid machinegun fire, complaining about everyone from his peers to his family – but he convinces more as the original sad rapper."

Randall Roberts of Los Angeles Times said, "The 17 tracks read like a fed-up farewell note penned in Drake's typically introspective, first-person style. It's so fresh the ink's still wet: bracingly honest and filled with observations about the darkness just outside the circle of the spotlight." Kevin Ritchie of Now said, "Drake is increasingly astute at reframing hip-hop braggadocio about wealth and competition as a kind of existential crisis through telling--but now familiar--details about his life ("I got two mortgages $30 million in total") and subtle uses of melody and atmosphere." Craig Jenkins of Pitchfork said, "On If You're Reading This, all of this chest beating is delivered over the most darkly hypnotic beats Drake's graced since So Far Gone." Simon Vozick-Levinson of Rolling Stone said, "For the first time in his career, Drake doesn't sound like he wants to be remembered as one of the greats. This time, he just is." Andrew Unterberger of Spin said, "Too Late definitely scans as a transitional work, a transfixing moment-in-time sort of recording that sees an unprecedentedly fortified Drake firing off paranoid and power-drunk thoughts from his basement, sounding even lonelier than he does than when he specifically talks about feeling lonely."

Claire Lobenfeld of Fact said, "It's Too Late is a woozy, scattershot thing--Late Night Drake, if you will." Jim Farber of New York Daily News said, "The album ends up seeming more like a stop-gap than a surge ahead. For the first two-thirds, Drake relies on his usual sing-song style, stoking interest only with his inventive stretches in phrasing.... Otherwise, cooler hooks, melodic flashes of R&B, or great variation can be hard to find." Alex Denney of NME said, "For all the music's cagey intelligence, Drake sounds like the kind of guy who comes sauntering out the traps in a 100m race and immediately breaks out into a victory lap, pausing only to remonstrate with hecklers." Steve "Flash" Juon of RapReviews said, "If You're Reading This It's Too Late isn't that good.... There are definitely some songs that have commercial potential that I don't hate, and though I'd rather hear Drake rapping than singing, "Jungle" seems like the kind of track that with a few choice edits could get radio play."

=== Rankings ===
Select rankings of If You're Reading This It's Too Late
Publication	List	Rank	Ref.
The Guardian	The Best Albums of 2015	14	
NME	NME's Albums of the Year 2015	23	
Pitchfork	The 50 Best Albums of 2015	17	
Pitchfork	The 200 Best Albums of the 2010s	69	
Rolling Stone	50 Best Albums of 2015	3	
Rolling Stone	40 Best Rap Albums of 2015	2	
Rolling Stone	500 Greatest Albums of All Time	367	
Rolling Stone	The 200 Greatest Hip-Hop Albums of All Time	125	
Stereogum	The 50 Best Albums of 2015	25	

=== Industry awards ===
Awards and nominations for If You're Reading This It's Too Late
Year	Ceremony	Category	Result	Ref.
2015	BET Hip Hop Awards	Album of the Year	Nominated	
2015	Billboard Music Awards	Top Rap Album	Nominated	
2015	Polaris Music Prize	Polaris Music Prize	Longlisted	
2016	Billboard Music Awards	Top Rap Album	Nominated	
2016	Grammy Awards	Best Rap Album	Nominated	

== Commercial performance ==
If You're Reading This It's Too Late debuted at number one on the Canadian Albums Chart, selling 37,000 copies in its first week. The mixtape also debuted at number one on the US Billboard 200, selling 535,000 album-equivalent units, 495,000 of which consisted of traditional whole album sales. The mixtape was also streamed 17.3 million times on Spotify, breaking Drake's own record that was made with Nothing Was the Same's debut week. Because of the mixtape, Drake also became the first rapper to top the US Billboard Artist 100. As of December 2015, the mixtape has sold 1.1 million copies in the United States. On October 27, 2023, the mixtape was certified quadruple platinum by the Recording Industry Association of America (RIAA) for combined sales and album-equivalent units of over four million units.

== Track listing ==
If You're Reading This It's Too Late track listing
No.	Title	Writer(s)	Producer(s)	Length
1.	"Legend"	Aubrey Graham; Jahron Brathwaite; Benjamin Bush; Stephen Garrett; Quentin Miller; Timothy Mosley	PartyNextDoor	4:01
2.	"Energy"	Graham; Matthew Samuels; Matthew O'Brien; Richard Dorfmeister; Markus Kienzi; Phillip Thomas	Boi-1da; OB O'Brien^{[a]}	3:01
3.	"10 Bands"	Graham; Samuels; Rupert Thomas Jr.; Miller; Adam Feeney	Boi-1da; Sevn Thomas^{[a]}	2:57
4.	"Know Yourself"	Graham; Samuels; Anderson Hernandez; Joshua Scruggs; Miller; Peter Milray; Allen Ritter	Boi-1da; Vinylz^{[a]}; Syk Sense^{[a]}	4:35
5.	"No Tellin'"	Graham; Samuels; Feeney; Thomas Paxton-Beesley; Kenza Samir	Boi-1da; Frank Dukes^{[a]}	5:10
6.	"Madonna"	Graham; Noah Shebib; Bush; Garrett; Mosley	40	4:08
7.	"6 God"	Graham; Samuels; Scruggs	Boi-1da; Syk Sense	3:00
8.	"Star67"	Graham; Fred Muehlboeck; Amir Obeid	MostHigh; Nylz; Vinylz^{[b]}	4:55
9.	"Preach" (featuring PartyNextDoor)	Graham; Brathwaite; Shebib; Alicia Cook; Kerry Brothers Jr.; Edwin Jantunen	PartyNextDoor	3:56
10.	"Wednesday Night Interlude" (featuring PartyNextDoor)	Brathwaite; Nathan Shaw	PartyNextDoor	3:32
11.	"Used To" (featuring Lil Wayne)	Graham; Dwayne Carter Jr.; Ebony Oshunrinde; Miller; Samir; Marcello Giombini	WondaGurl	4:28
12.	"6 Man"	Graham; Shebib; Jahmar Carter; Scott Storch; Jill Scott; Tariq Trotter; Ahmir Thompson	40; Daxz^{[a]}	2:47
13.	"Now & Forever"	Graham; Eric Dingus; Gordon Phillips	Dingus; Jimmy Prime	4:41
14.	"Company" (featuring Travis Scott)	Graham; Jacques Webster; Oshunrinde; Ritter; Bryan Simmons; Joshua Luellen	WondaGurl; Travis Scott; Ritter^{[a]}; TM88^{[a]}	4:12
15.	"You & the 6"	Graham; Samuels; Shebib; Ramon Ibanga Jr.; Hernandez; Ritter; Majid Al-Maskati; Jenna Andrews; Jordan Andrews	Boi-1da; 40^{[a]}; Illmind^{[a]}	4:24
16.	"Jungle"	Graham; Shebib; Samir; Gabriel Garzón-Montano	40	5:20
17.	"6PM in New York"	Graham; Samuels; Feeney; Thomas Jr.; Samir	Boi-1da; Frank Dukes^{[a]}; Sevn Thomas^{[a]}	4:43
Total length:				68:38

CD/Vinyl (bonus tracks)
No.	Title	Writer(s)	Producer(s)	Length
18.	"How About Now"	Graham; Samuels; Jordan Evans; Donald DeGrate; Richard Hailey	Boi-1da; Evans^{[a]}	3:55
19.	"My Side"	Graham; Shebib; Samuels; Noel Cadastre	40; Boi-1da^{[a]}	4:40
Total length:				77:13

Notes

- ^{^[a]} signifies a co-producer
- ^{^[b]} signifies an uncredited co-producer
- "Madonna" is 2:58 on streaming and digital copies of the album, omitting the second verse. The full version is exclusive to physical copies of the album

Sample credits

- "Legend" contains a sample of "So Anxious", written by Timothy Mosley, Stephen Garrett and Benjamin Bush, performed by Ginuwine.
- "Energy" contains samples of "Eazy-Duz-It", written by Eric Wright, Lorenzo Patterson, Andre Young and Antoine Carraby, performed by Eazy-E; and "Ridin' Spinners", performed by Three 6 Mafia.
- "Know Yourself" contains a sample of "Tinted Glass", written by Peter Milray, performed by Network.
- "No Tellin'" contains excerpts of "No Talk", performed by River Tiber.
- "Madonna" contains a sample of "So Anxious", written by Timothy Mosley, Stephen Garrett and Benjamin Bush, performed by Ginuwine.
- "6 God" contains a sample of "Haunted Chase", included from the Donkey Kong Country 2: Diddy's Kong Quest OST, written by David Wise.
- "Preach" contains samples of "Body Party", written by Ciara Harris, Nayvadius Wilburn and Michael Williams II, performed by Ciara; as well as "Stay", performed by Henry Krinkle.
- "Preach" and "Wednesday Night Interlude" both contains excerpts of "Unfaith", performed by Ekali.
- "6 Man" contains an interpolation of "You Got Me", written by Tariq Trotter, Ahmir Thompson, Scott Storch and Jill Scott, performed by The Roots.
- "Jungle" contains a sample of "6 8", written and performed by Gabriel Garzón-Montano.
- "How About Now" contains a sample of "My Heart Belongs To U", written by Donald DeGrate, performed by Jodeci.

== Personnel ==
Credits were adapted from the mixtape's liner notes.

Musicians

- Drake – vocals
- Matthew Samuels – bass guitar (tracks 3, 4, 7), drum programming (3–5, 15, 17),
- Rupert Thomas – drum programming (3, 17)
- Joshua Scruggs – bass guitar, drum programming (4, 7)
- Anderson Hernandez – bass guitar (4, 15), drum programming (4), programming (15)
- Noah Shebib – additional keyboards (8, 15)
- Daxz – drum programming (12)
- Allen Ritter – bass guitar (15)

Technical

- Noah Shebib – mixing (1, 2, 4, 6, 7, 9, 10, 13, 14, 17), engineering (2, 3, 5, 11, 12, 15)
- Noel "Gadget" Campbell – mixing (3, 5, 7, 11, 12, 15, 16)
- Noel Cadastre – engineering (1–9, 11, 13–17), recording arrangement (17)
- Evan Stewart – engineering (9), mixing assistance (1, 4, 6, 7, 11, 14), engineering assistance (2, 3, 5, 8, 16)
- Micah "Chozen" Williams – engineering (9, 10)
- Matthew Samuels – recording arrangement (3, 5, 17)
- Les Bateman – mixing assistance (2, 3, 5, 7, 11, 15, 16)
- Gregg Moffett – mixing assistance (9, 10, 13, 17), engineering assistance (1, 3, 5, 7)
- Coran "Cans" Nariman – engineering assistance (4)
- Mark Robinson – engineering assistance (6)

== Charts ==
=== Weekly charts ===
Chart performance for If You're Reading This It's Too Late
Chart (2015)	Peak position
Australian Albums (ARIA)	2
Austrian Albums (Ö3 Austria)	20
Belgian Albums (Ultratop Flanders)	31
Belgian Albums (Ultratop Wallonia)	47
Canadian Albums (Billboard)	1
Danish Albums (Hitlisten)	6
Dutch Albums (Album Top 100)	15
Finnish Albums (Suomen virallinen lista)	30
French Albums (SNEP)	55
German Albums (Offizielle Top 100)	89
Irish Albums (IRMA)	13
Japanese Albums (Oricon)	188
New Zealand Albums (RMNZ)	3
Norwegian Albums (VG-lista)	14
Scottish Albums (Official Charts)	8
Swedish Albums (Sverigetopplistan)	16
Swiss Albums (Schweizer Hitparade)	7
UK Albums (Official Charts)	3
UK R&B Albums (Official Charts)	1
US Billboard 200	1
US Top R&B/Hip-Hop Albums (Billboard)	1

=== Year-end charts ===
2015 year-end chart performance for If You're Reading This It's Too Late
Chart (2015)	Position
Australian Albums (ARIA)	57
Canadian Albums (Billboard)	5
UK Albums (OCC)	49
US Billboard 200	4
US Top R&B/Hip-Hop Albums (Billboard)	1

2016 year-end chart performance for If You're Reading This It's Too Late
Chart (2016)	Position
Canadian Albums (Billboard)	29
Danish Albums (Hitlisten)	83
US Billboard 200	35
US Top R&B/Hip-Hop Albums (Billboard)	19

2017 year-end chart performance for If You're Reading This It's Too Late
Chart (2017)	Position
US Billboard 200	86
US Top R&B/Hip-Hop Albums (Billboard)	69

2018 year-end chart performance for If You're Reading This It's Too Late
Chart (2018)	Position
US Billboard 200	139

=== Decade-end charts ===
Decade-end chart performance for If You're Reading This It's Too Late
Chart (2010–2019)	Position
US Billboard 200	70

== Certifications ==
Certifications for If You're Reading This It's Too Late
Region	Certification	Certified units/sales
Australia (ARIA)	Platinum	70,000^{‡}
Canada (Music Canada)	2× Platinum	160,000^{‡}
Denmark (IFPI Danmark)	Platinum	20,000^{‡}
New Zealand (RMNZ)	Platinum	15,000^{‡}
United Kingdom (BPI)	Platinum	300,000^{‡}
United States (RIAA)	5× Platinum	5,000,000^{‡}
^{‡} Sales+streaming figures based on certification alone.

== Release history ==
Release dates and formats for If You're Reading This It's Too Late
Region	Date	Label(s)	Format(s)	Ref.
Various	February 13, 2015	Cash Money	Digital download	
Various	April 21, 2015	Cash Money; OVO; Republic; Young Money	CD	
Various	October 28, 2016	Cash Money; OVO; Republic; Young Money	Vinyl	

== See also ==
- List of number-one albums of 2015 (Canada)
- List of UK R&B Albums Chart number ones of 2015
- List of Billboard 200 number-one albums of 2015
- List of Billboard number-one R&B/hip-hop albums of 2015
