= Some Special Shows 4 U =

2025 concert tour by Drake and PartyNextDoor

- Tour by Drake and PartyNextDoor
- Promotional poster for mainland Europe
- Location: Europe
- Associated albums: Some Sexy Songs 4 U
- Start date: July 11, 2025
- End date: September 23, 2025
- No. of shows: 37
- Supporting acts: Summer Walker; Burna Boy; Vybz Kartel; Boy Better Know; DJ Spade
- Attendance: 677,656 / 677,656
- Box office: $122,099,506

Drake and PartyNextDoor concert chronology
- Anita Max Win Tour (2025); Some Special Shows 4 U (2025)

The Some Special Shows 4 U tour was a co-headlining concert tour by Canadian musicians Drake and PartyNextDoor, in support of their collaborative album, Some Sexy Songs 4 U (2025). The tour, which is Drake's sixth co-headlining tour and PartyNextDoor's second, commenced on July 11, 2025, in London, and concluded on September 23, in Hamburg, consisting of 37 shows.

== Background ==
In February 2025, Drake embarked on the Anita Max Win Tour in Oceania; however, due to scheduling issues and the release of Drake and PartyNextDoor's collaborative album, Some Sexy Songs 4 U, the final four dates of the tour were postponed and are set to be rescheduled. Later that month, Drake was announced as the headliner for all three nights of Wireless Festival in London that same year. All tickets for the festival sold out within minutes, setting the record for the fastest sale of tickets in festival history.

On June 3, the Some Special Shows 4 U Tour was announced for Europe, with tickets available for initial presale on June 4, and general sale on June 6. An extra date in Manchester, Birmingham, Zurich, Cologne, Amsterdam, Berlin, and Munich, as well as two extra dates in Assago (Milan), were added on June 5, due to extreme demand. On June 18, an extra Manchester date was added for August 4. The tour marks Drake's first live performances in Italy.

On July 21, the August 9 show in Zurich was cancelled, due to issues with existing venue renovations and expected setup timelines for Drake's staging. Six days later, it was announced that the July 28 show in Manchester will be rescheduled to August 5, with the tour citing unforeseen ferry schedule and travel logistics. On August 1, it was announced that the August 7 show in Antwerp was pushed back one day, with a spokesperson for Drake again citing issues with travel logistics.

== Concert synopsis ==
A typical show of the Some Special Shows 4 U Tour lasts around 2 hours. It consists of 41 to 45 songs, with Drake and PartyNextDoor performing independently and together. With slightly varying times for each performance, Drake typically comes on stage between 9:15pm and 9:30pm, performing independently until being replaced by PartyNextDoor at 10:25pm. Drake returns on stage at 10:40pm and performs with PartyNextDoor until 10:50pm. Drake then performs independently until between 11:00pm and 11:30pm, when the show concludes.

The tour featured a stage which forms a ring around the standing room audience, with walkways running along the long end of the floor and larger stages at opposite ends of the arena. Drake typically performs across all the stages during a show.

The tour attracted some controversy due to audience members chanting "fuck Kendrick" during the shows, referencing Drake's 2024 feud with rapper Kendrick Lamar. The tour also featured instances of crowd trouble: objects, including empty water bottles and toilet paper, were thrown on stage near Drake by concertgoers at some shows in Amsterdam and London.

== Critical reception ==
In a synopsis for Yahoo, Jaspreet Kaur wrote Drake "was intent on proving something [with his performances] and he more than succeeded". Kaur commended Drake's energy, stage presence and vocals, saying "he delivered every song with raw vulnerability; you could feel every word". Maria Sarabi of Hello! praised Drake's stage presence and the versatility of the music, saying that it goes from "a burst of energy" to "intimate and nostalgic" and called the show "too special to miss". The Source's Shawn Grant called the show "explosive" and noted the chemistry between Drake and PartyNextDoor. This was echoed by Ian Westhead of ATV Today, who called the pair's chemistry "palpable" and underscored Drake's "high-energy" and "powerhouse" performance. Writing for The Manc, Thomas Melia praised the setlist, calling it "stacked", and highlighted Drake's "comical and cheeky" stage presence and his chemistry with PartyNextDoor, saying, "Drake’s career is timeless... Forget "One Dance" – [fans] had many."

In a review for Manchester Evening News, Danielle Roper also praised Drake's performance, writing, "[he] bounces around the stage and pounds down the runways with enormous energy [and] dexterity". In a mixed review, Rolling Stone's Ben Jolley commended Drake's "tireless puppy-like" energy and the show's "visually impressive" production, but criticized it for being overlong and for PartyNextDoor's "filler" performances, writing, "certain rounds of this career-spanning show fare better than others. [It] would certainly have benefited from a sharp edit". Kyann-Sian Williams of NME also gave a mixed review, praising its music selection but criticizing its conviction, and wrote, "watching Drake [is] still a rare, generational spectacle [but the tour] should've been [his] victory lap, reminding us why he earned all his success. Instead, it feels like a man floating above his own myth, still chasing the love he's already received".

In a positive review for The Observer, Shaad D'Souza called the tour "a strange, soppy bubble of narcissism – and it's wildly entertaining", praising Drake's catalog and emphasis on audience energy, calling the crowd "its own form of visual entertainment". He also wrote, "[Drake's] music is about feeling good, feeling your own emotions, prioritising yourself in a totally toxic way. That feeling is magnified [by the tour]. Drake's universe is a strange but happy one".

== Set list ==
This set list is representative of the show in Birmingham, performed on July 20, 2025. This set list is not representative of every show on the tour.

Drake

1. "Gimme a Hug"
2. "Marvins Room"
3. "Teenage Fever"
4. "Passionfruit"
5. "Jungle"
6. "What Did I Miss?"
7. "Headlines"
8. "Know Yourself"
9. "Nonstop"
10. "Sicko Mode" (Drake's contributions only)
11. "No Face"
12. "Circadian Rhythm"
13. "Laugh Now Cry Later"
14. "God's Plan"
15. "In My Feelings"
16. "Nice for What"
17. "Controlla" (Remixed version)
18. "Find Your Love" (Remixed version)
19. "Hold On, We're Going Home" (Remixed version)
20. "One Dance" (Remixed version)
21. "Blue Green Red"
22. "Who Told You" (Drake's contributions only)

PartyNextDoor

23. "Break from Toronto"
24. "Wus Good / Curious"
25. "TBH"
26. "Make It to the Morning"
27. "No Chill"

Drake and PartyNextDoor

28. "CN Tower"
29. "Something About You"
30. "Spider-Man Superman"
31. "Die Trying"
32. "Somebody Loves Me"
33. "OMW"

Drake

34. "Girls Want Girls"
35. "Fancy"
36. "Love Me" (Drake's contributions only)
37. "Hours in Silence"
38. "Rich Baby Daddy"
39. "You Broke My Heart"
40. "Knife Talk"
41. "Rich Flex"
42. "IDGAF"
43. "Hotline Bling"
44. "Nokia"
45. "Yebba's Heartbreak" (Backing vocals only)

=== Notes ===
- On the July 11 show in London, Drake performed "Nice for What" with Lauryn Hill.
- On the July 12 show in London, Drake performed "Who Told You" with J Hus, and "Knife Talk" and "Rich Flex" with 21 Savage.
- Starting with the July 21 show in Birmingham, "Blue Green Red", "Something About You", "Spider-Man Superman" and "OMW" were removed from the set list and replaced with "Come and See Me".
- On the July 23 show in Birmingham, "Gimme a Hug" was replaced with "Iron Man" by Black Sabbath in tribute to singer Ozzy Osbourne, who died a day prior.
- On the July 25 show in Manchester, Drake also performed "Which One" with Central Cee.
- On the July 30 show in Amsterdam, Drake also performed "Madiba Riddim".
- Starting with the July 31 show in Amsterdam, "Gimmie a Hug" was replaced by "Over My Dead Body" and "Over" was added to the setlist.
- On the August 4 and August 5 shows in Manchester, Drake also performed "Signs" and "Which One", additionally performing "The Motto" during the August 5 show.
- On the August 8 show in Antwerp, Drake also performed "Madiba Riddim", "Energy", "Jumpman", and "Over".
- On the August 11 show in Zurich and on the August 15 and August 16 shows in Cologne, Drake performed "IDGAF" with Yeat.
- On the August 16 show in Cologne, Drake also performed "Signs".
- On the August 21 and August 22 shows in Stockholm, Drake also performed "Which One", "Over", "Started From the Bottom" and "Jumpman".
- On the August 25 show in Copenhagen, Drake also performed "Madiba Riddim" and "Signs".
- On the August 30, September 1 and September 2 shows in Assago, Drake also performed "Energy, "Jumpman", "Over", "Started From the Bottom", "Madiba Riddim" and "Signs".
- On the September 1 and September 2 shows in Assago and the September 5 show in Paris, Drake also performed "Which One", and "IDGAF" and "Flawless" with Yeat. Sfera Ebbasta also made surprise appearances for the Assago shows, performing "G63" and "Non Metterci Becco" on the first night, "Calcolatrici" and "XDVR" on the second night, and "Visiera a Becco" on both nights.

== Shows ==
Date (2025)	City	Country	Venue	Supporting act(s)	Attendance	Revenue
July 11 (Note: This show was part of Wireless Festival.)	London	England	Finsbury Park	PartyNextDoor (Note: Drake was the solo headliner of Wireless Festival. PartyNextDoor was the co-headliner for all other tour dates.); Summer Walker	150,000 / 150,000	$33,588,832
July 12	London	England	Finsbury Park	Boy Better Know	150,000 / 150,000	$33,588,832
July 13	London	England	Finsbury Park	Burna Boy; Vybz Kartel	150,000 / 150,000	$33,588,832
July 20	Birmingham	England	Utilita Arena Birmingham	DJ Spade	39,128 / 39,128	$7,150,436
July 21	Birmingham	England	Utilita Arena Birmingham	DJ Spade	39,128 / 39,128	$7,150,436
July 23	Birmingham	England	Utilita Arena Birmingham	DJ Spade	39,128 / 39,128	$7,150,436
July 25	Manchester	England	Co-op Live	DJ Spade	35,282 / 35,282	$5,883,675
July 26	Manchester	England	Co-op Live	DJ Spade	35,282 / 35,282	$5,883,675
July 30	Amsterdam	Netherlands	Ziggo Dome	DJ Spade	43,710 / 43,710	$6,400,864
July 31	Amsterdam	Netherlands	Ziggo Dome	DJ Spade	43,710 / 43,710	$6,400,864
August 2	Amsterdam	Netherlands	Ziggo Dome	DJ Spade	43,710 / 43,710	$6,400,864
August 4	Manchester	England	Co-op Live	DJ Spade	35,282 / 35,282	$5,883,675
August 5 (Note: This show was originally scheduled for July 28, 2025.)	Manchester	England	Co-op Live	DJ Spade	35,282 / 35,282	$5,883,675
August 8 (Note: This show was originally scheduled for August 7, 2025.)	Antwerp	Belgium	Sportpaleis	DJ Spade	19,875 / 19,875	$3,094,001
August 11	Zurich	Switzerland	Hallenstadion	DJ Spade	29,000 / 29,000	$5,820,337
August 12	Zurich	Switzerland	Hallenstadion	DJ Spade	29,000 / 29,000	$5,820,337
August 15	Cologne	Germany	Lanxess Arena	DJ Spade	48,879 / 48,879	$7,501,867
August 16	Cologne	Germany	Lanxess Arena	DJ Spade	48,879 / 48,879	$7,501,867
August 18	Cologne	Germany	Lanxess Arena	DJ Spade	48,879 / 48,879	$7,501,867
August 21	Stockholm	Sweden	Avicii Arena	DJ Spade	31,443 / 31,443	$5,631,925
August 22	Stockholm	Sweden	Avicii Arena	DJ Spade	31,443 / 31,443	$5,631,925
August 24	Copenhagen	Denmark	Royal Arena	DJ Spade	31,049 / 31,049	$5,806,754
August 25	Copenhagen	Denmark	Royal Arena	DJ Spade	31,049 / 31,049	$5,806,754
August 29	Assago (Note: Marketed as Milan in promotional material.)	Italy	Unipol Forum	DJ Spade	55,798 / 55,798	$9,535,481
August 30	Assago	Italy	Unipol Forum	DJ Spade	55,798 / 55,798	$9,535,481
September 1	Assago	Italy	Unipol Forum	DJ Spade	55,798 / 55,798	$9,535,481
September 2	Assago	Italy	Unipol Forum	DJ Spade	55,798 / 55,798	$9,535,481
September 7	Paris	France	Accor Arena	DJ Spade	34,000 / 34,000	$6,174,854
September 8	Paris	France	Accor Arena	DJ Spade	34,000 / 34,000	$6,174,854
September 11	Berlin	Germany	Uber Arena	DJ Spade	46,992 / 46,992	$7,102,703
September 12	Berlin	Germany	Uber Arena	DJ Spade	46,992 / 46,992	$7,102,703
September 14	Berlin	Germany	Uber Arena	DJ Spade	46,992 / 46,992	$7,102,703
September 16	Munich	Germany	Olympiahalle	DJ Spade	45,470 / 45,470	$7,005,170
September 18	Munich	Germany	Olympiahalle	DJ Spade	45,470 / 45,470	$7,005,170
September 19	Munich	Germany	Olympiahalle	DJ Spade	45,470 / 45,470	$7,005,170
September 22	Hamburg	Germany	Barclays Arena	DJ Spade	31,749 / 31,749	$5,518,932
September 23	Hamburg	Germany	Barclays Arena	DJ Spade	31,749 / 31,749	$5,518,932
Total					677,656 / 677,656	$122,099,506

== Cancelled shows ==
List of cancelled concerts, showing date, city, country, venue, and reason for cancellation
Date	City	Country	Venue	Reason
August 9, 2025	Zurich	Switzerland	Hallenstadion	Venue renovations and setup timelines
