= Somebody Loves Me (PartyNextDoor and Drake song) =

Single by PartyNextDoor and Drake

from the album Some Sexy Songs 4 U
- Released: March 11, 2025
- Recorded: 2024
- Studio: S.O.T.A (Florida); Sanctuary (Nassau)
- Genre: R&B
- Length: 3:02 (album version); 3:01 (Part 2 featuring Cash Cobain)
- Label: Santa Anna; OVO; Republic
- Songwriters: Jahron Braithwaite; Aubrey Graham; Phillip Boelhoff
- Producers: DJ Lewis; O Lil Angel; Wondra030

PartyNextDoor singles chronology
"Dreamin'" (2024)	"Somebody Loves Me" (2025)	"Die Trying" (2025)

Drake singles chronology
"Gimme a Hug" (2025)	"Somebody Loves Me" / "Nokia" (2025)	"Die Trying" (2025)

"Somebody Loves Me" is a song by Canadian musicians PartyNextDoor and Drake. It is the sixteenth track from their collaborative studio album Some Sexy Songs 4 U. Written by Drake, PartyNextDoor and Phillip Boelhoff, it was produced by DJ Lewis, O Lil Angel, and Wondra030, it was released on February 14, 2025, by Santa Anna Label Group, OVO Sound and Republic Records. It impacted US rhythmic radio as the album's third single on March 11, 2025.

== Critical reception ==
The song received positive reviews. Billboard's Michael Saponara and Carl Lamarre ranked the song as the second best track on Some Sexy Songs 4 U. Saponara described the track as a "vintage toxic R&B [anthem]" and that the "duo delivered on their promise and showcased they can still dominate the lane when the pick-and-roll is called".

== Music videos ==
Nineteen music videos were released for "Somebody Loves Me" directed by various directors. They were released on August 28, 2025, through Drake's YouTube channel. The most-viewed video for the song is the Justice Silvera-directed video, achieving over 3.6 million views on YouTube. On the videos' descriptions, the synopsis are written below it.

== Remix ==
In April 2025, a song tentatively titled "Somebody Eats Me" by rapper Cash Cobain surfaced on the Internet, which heavily sampled "Somebody Loves Me". On September 4, Drake premiered the final version of the track on his "Iceman: Episode 3" stream, promoting his upcoming ninth studio album. The final version omitted a portion of Cash Cobain's verse from the leak, and added new verses from Drake and PartyNextDoor. The final version would be released on September 5 as "Somebody Loves Me Pt. 2".

== Credits and personnel ==
Credits were adapted from the liner notes.

Recording

- S.O.T.A Studios – Florida, United States
- Sanctuary Studios – Nassau, The Bahamas

Musicians

- Drake – vocals, songwriter
- PartyNextDoor – vocals, songwriter
- Phillip Boelhoff – songwriter
- Destiny Nowell – background vocals

Technical

- Chris Athens – mastering engineer
- Noel Cadastre – recording engineer, mixing engineer
- Dave Huffman – assistant mastering engineer
- Prep Bijan – engineering

== Charts ==
=== Weekly charts ===
Weekly chart performance for "Somebody Loves Me"
Chart (2025)	Peak position
Australia (ARIA)	97
Canada Hot 100 (Billboard)	27
Global 200 (Billboard)	43
UK Hip Hop/R&B (OCC)	30
UK Streaming (OCC)	74
US Billboard Hot 100	30
US Hot R&B/Hip-Hop Songs (Billboard)	13
US Rhythmic Airplay (Billboard)	1

Weekly chart performance for "Somebody Loves Me Pt. 2"
Chart (2025)	Peak position
New Zealand Hot Singles (RMNZ)	11
UK Singles (OCC)	83
UK Hip Hop/R&B (OCC)	22
US Billboard Hot 100	27
US Hot R&B/Hip-Hop Songs (Billboard)	3

=== Year-end charts ===
Year-end chart performance for "Somebody Loves Me"
Chart (2025)	Position
US Billboard Hot 100	85
US Hot R&B/Hip-Hop Songs (Billboard)	15
US Rhythmic Airplay (Billboard)	14

== Certifications ==
Certifications for "Somebody Loves Me"
Region	Certification	Certified units/sales
United Kingdom (BPI)	Silver	200,000^{‡}
United States (RIAA)	Platinum	1,000,000^{‡}
^{‡} Sales+streaming figures based on certification alone.
