= Teenage Fever =

Song by Drake

from the album More Life
- Released: March 18, 2017
- Genre: Electro
- Length: 3:39
- Label: Young Money; Cash Money
- Songwriters: Rodney Jerkins; Aubrey Drake Graham; Jennifer Lopez; LaShawn Daniels; Cory Rooney; Fred Jerkins III; Marvin "Hagler" Thomas
- Producer: Marvin "Hagler" Thomas

Audio video
- "Teenage Fever" on YouTube

"Teenage Fever" is a song by Canadian rapper Drake. It premiered on OVO Sound Radio alongside his fifth mixtape, More Life, on March 18, 2017, released by Young Money Entertainment and Cash Money Records in association with Apple Music. The track samples elements from Jennifer Lopez's 1999 single, "If You Had My Love". Its production, created in FL Studio, was inspired by the death of Marvin "Hagler" Thomas's nephew.

"Teenage Fever" was the twelfth most-streamed song in the U.S. during the tracking week ending March 23, 2017, debuting at number 35 on the Billboard Hot 100 and earning a platinum certification from the Recording Industry Association of America. The song also reached number 22 on the Canadian Hot 100 and number 37 on the UK Singles Chart. It achieved gold certification in Brazil and Denmark, platinum in the UK, double platinum in New Zealand, and triple platinum in Australia. Lopez performed a cover of the song at the Time 100 Gala, while Drake included it in his It's All a Blur Tour performances.

== Background and release ==
During an interview with Entertainment Tonight on January 18, 2017, Jennifer Lopez confirmed that she was working with Drake for his upcoming project. She added that "we'll see if it's on his next album". Written by Rodney Jerkins, Drake, Jennifer Lopez, LaShawn Daniels, Cory Rooney, Fred Jerkins III, and its producer Marvin "Hagler" Thomas, "Teenage Fever" was released as part of his fifth mixtape More Life by Young Money Entertainment and Cash Money Records.

In collaboration with Apple Music, the mixtape debuted on OVO Sound Radio on March 18, 2017, six months after its track list was teased. Lopez made an appearance as a sampled artist, but she was expected on another song that was playing in the background of a leaked video, which portrayed her and Drake dancing to a track that featured both their vocals. During Drake's ongoing beef with Kendrick Lamar, "Teenage Fever" was used as a reference to support the accusations made by Lamar that Drake is a pedophile.

== Composition ==
"Teenage Fever"
A 20-second sample of "Teenage Fever" by Drake, where part of the chorus is heard, interpolating "If You Had My Love".

"Teenage Fever" is three minutes and 39 seconds long. It is the fourteenth track on More Life, produced by Martin "Hagler" Thomas, mixed by Noel "Gadget" Campbell and mastered by Chris Athens with assistance from David Huffman. It is a love song that portrays the initial excitement of developing feelings for someone new.

The song contains a slowed-down vocal sample of "If You Had My Love" by Jennifer Lopez on the chorus. During Deconstructed for Genius, a segment where record producers analyze the instrumentals of songs, Hagler said that he was going through a lot when he made the beat, because of the death of his nephew who perished in a car accident. Hagler was in Toronto with Noah "40" Shebib when he produced "Teenage Fever". The instrumental, produced in FL Studio, contains reversed melodies. For the chords, he applied gross beat, an audio effect plugin, on the Rhodes piano. Decapitator, a saturation plugin, was added to the bassline and the hi-hats were assembled using Effectrix, an audio sequencer.

Writing for Rolling Stone, Rob Sheffield described it as "a near-perfect electro-swoon groove", and went on to praise Drake's musical craft. Slate described it as "a sly and blessedly fleeting allusion to his personal life". Towards the end of the track, British rapper Dave is heard performing the outro.

== Commercial performance ==
According to Nielsen Music, on the tracking week ending March 23, 2017, "Teenage Fever" was the twelfth most streamed song in the U.S. It debuted at number 35 on the U.S. Billboard Hot 100 on the chart dating April 8, 2017, and reached number 18 on the U.S. Hot R&B/Hip-Hop Songs chart. It peaked at number 22 on the Canadian Hot 100. In the U.K., the Official Charts Company ranked Drake's most streamed songs in 2023, "Teenage Fever" placed 29th out of 40. It debuted at number 37 on the UK singles chart, and reached number 11 on the UK Hip Hop and R&B Singles Chart in the tracking week of March 31, 2017 – April 6, 2017. Elsewhere, it peaked at number 8 in Sweden, number 49 in Ireland, number 67 in Portugal, number 93 in the Netherlands, and number 172 in France.

"Teenage Fever" was certified platinum by the Recording Industry Association of America for selling over 1,000,000 units in the U.S. It was certified triple platinum by the Australian Recording Industry Association in Australia for moving 210,000 figures, double platinum by Recorded Music NZ in New Zealand for selling 60,000 units, and platinum by the British Phonographic Industry in the United Kingdom for moving 600,000 sales figures. "Teenage Fever" was also certified gold for selling 45,000 units in Denmark and 20,000 units in Brazil by IFPI Denmark and Pro-Música Brasil respectively.

== Live performances ==
Jennifer Lopez covered Drake's verse from "Teenage Fever" during her performance at the Time 100 Gala in 2018. Drake performed the song on July 31, 2023, in Philadelphia, and again on February 2, 2024, in Tampa, Florida during his fifth co-headlining concert tour, It's All a Blur Tour. He performed the song on February 4, 2025, during his Anita Max Win Tour at the RAC Arena in Perth, Australia.

== Personnel ==
Credits were adapted from the liner notes.

Musicians

- Aubrey Drake Graham – vocals, songwriter
- Jennifer Lopez – sampled artist, songwriter
- Rodney Jerkins – songwriter
- LaShawn Daniels – songwriter
- Cory Rooney – songwriter
- Fred Jerkins III – songwriter
- Marvin "Hagler" Thomas – producer, songwriter

Technical

- Noel Cadastre – recording engineer
- Noel "Gadget" Campbell – mixing engineer
- Chris Athens – mastering engineer
- David Huffman – assistant mastering engineer

== Charts ==
Chart performance for "Teenage Fever"
Chart (2017)	Peak position
Canada (Canadian Hot 100)	22
Ireland (IRMA)	49
France (SNEP)	172
Netherlands (Single Top 100)	93
Portugal (AFP)	67
Sweden (Sverigetopplistan)	8
UK Singles (OCC)	37
UK Hip Hop/R&B (OCC)	11
US Billboard Hot 100	35
US Hot R&B/Hip-Hop Songs (Billboard)	18

== Certifications ==
Certifications for "Teenage Fever"
Region	Certification	Certified units/sales
Australia (ARIA)	3× Platinum	210,000^{‡}
Brazil (Pro-Música Brasil)	Gold	20,000^{‡}
Denmark (IFPI Danmark)	Gold	45,000^{‡}
New Zealand (RMNZ)	2× Platinum	60,000^{‡}
United Kingdom (BPI)	Platinum	600,000^{‡}
United States (RIAA)	Platinum	1,000,000^{‡}
^{‡} Sales+streaming figures based on certification alone.
