= Die Trying (PartyNextDoor, Drake, and Yebba song) =

Single by PartyNextDoor, Drake, and Yebba

from the album Some Sexy Songs 4 U
- Released: April 18, 2025
- Recorded: 2024
- Studio: Sanctuary (Nassau)
- Genre: R&B; pop
- Length: 3:15
- Label: Santa Anna; OVO; Republic
- Songwriters: Jahron Brathwaite; Aubrey Graham; Abigail Smith; Jordan Ullman; Kenneth Rockwell Ullman; Noah Smith; Blue Foley; Pearl Clarkin; Brock Butler
- Producer: Jordan Ullman

PartyNextDoor singles chronology
"Somebody Loves Me" (2025)	"Die Trying" (2025)	"Some of Your Love" (2026)

Drake singles chronology
"Nokia" / "Somebody Loves Me" (2025)	"Die Trying" (2025)	"2 Mazza" (2025)

Yebba singles chronology
"Waterfall (I Adore You)" (2023)	"Die Trying" (2025)	"Yellow Eyes" (2026)

"Die Trying" is a song recorded by Canadian musicians PartyNextDoor and Drake, and American singer Yebba for the former two's collaborative studio album, Some Sexy Songs 4 U. Produced by Jordan Ullman, it was released along with the rest of the album on February 14, 2025, by Santa Anna Label Group, OVO Sound and Republic Records. It was released as a single on April 18, 2025.

== Composition ==
"Die Trying" is 3 minutes and 15 seconds long. Produced by Jordan Ullman of Majid Jordan, it was mixed by 40 with assistance from OUPSiNG, and mastered by Chris Athens assisted by Dave Huffman. Jordan's brother, Kenneth Rockwell Ullman plays the guitar in the song.

== Critical reception ==
The song received mixed reviews. Billboard's Michael Saponara ranked the song as the thirteenth best track on Some Sexy Songs 4 U. Saponara wrote that Drake and Party "slow the pace down and bring out the guitars for an airy instrumental that Natasha Bedingfield could’ve meshed with" and that "Yebba’s soothing coo brings [the song] tastefully across the finish line". However, Alphonse Pierre for Pitchfork wrote that the track is a "half-assed attempt to get the Nashville bag". Writing for Exclaim!, Alex Hudson described the track as an "unexpectedly cute acoustic pop ditty".

== Credits and personnel ==
Credits were adapted from the liner notes.

Recording

- S.O.T.A Studios – Florida, United States
- Sanctuary Studios – Nassau, The Bahamas

Musicians

- PartyNextDoor – vocals, songwriter
- Drake – vocals, songwriter
- Yebba – vocals, songwriter
- Jordan Ullman – producer, keyboards, programming
- Kenneth Ullman – guitar

Technical

- 40 – mixing engineer
- Chris Athens – mastering engineer
- Noel Cadastre – recording engineer
- Prep Bijan – recording engineer
- Dave Huffman – assistant mastering engineer
- OUPSiNG – assistant mixing engineer

== Charts ==
=== Weekly charts ===
Weekly chart performance for "Die Trying"
Chart (2025)	Peak position
Australia (ARIA)	40
Australia Hip Hop/R&B (ARIA)	8
Canada Hot 100 (Billboard)	14
Global 200 (Billboard)	32
Ireland (IRMA)	51
Lebanon English Airplay (Lebanese Top 20)	13
New Zealand Hot Singles (RMNZ)	4
Sweden Heatseeker (Sverigetopplistan)	8
UK Singles (Official Charts)	42
US Billboard Hot 100	21

=== Year-end charts ===
Year-end chart performance for "Die Trying"
Chart (2025)	Position
Canada (Canadian Hot 100)	66

== Certifications ==
Certifications for "Die Trying"
Region	Certification	Certified units/sales
Canada (Music Canada)	2× Platinum	160,000^{‡}
Denmark (IFPI Danmark)	Gold	45,000^{‡}
New Zealand (RMNZ)	Platinum	30,000^{‡}
United Kingdom (BPI)	Silver	200,000^{‡}
United States (RIAA)	Platinum	1,000,000^{‡}
^{‡} Sales+streaming figures based on certification alone.
