= Some Sexy Songs 4 U =

Studio album by PartyNextDoor and Drake
- Released: February 14, 2025
- Recorded: 2024–2025
- Studios: Sanctuary (Nassau); The Chapel; S.O.T.A. (Toronto); Metalworks (Mississauga)
- Genres: R&B; hip-hop; trap
- Length: 73:30
- Languages: English; Spanish
- Labels: OVO; Santa Anna; Republic
- Producers: PartyNextDoor; 29 Millions; Aiona; Alex Lustig; Ali Roots; Bangs; Blaccmass; Chibu; DJ Lewis; Earl on the Beat; Eli; Elkan; Gent!; Gordo; Harley Arsenault; Imovekiloz; Johannes Klahr; JOP; Jordan Ullman; Jose De Luna; Kid Masterpiece; Kiyoshi; Laf; Livewire; London Cyr; Mighty Max; M3rge; Nasamadeit; Niketaz; Niko; Noel Cadastre; Nyan; O Lil Angel; Prep; Reemz; Richard Zestenker; Room33; Scandi; Simon Hessman; Skip2Fame; Turrini; Vawn; Wondra030

PartyNextDoor chronology
PartyNextDoor 4 (2024)	Some Sexy Songs 4 U (2025)

Drake chronology
100 Gigs (2024)	Some Sexy Songs 4 U (2025)	Iceman (2026)

Singles from Some Sexy Songs 4 U
- 1. "Gimme a Hug" Released: February 26, 2025; 2. "Nokia" Released: March 11, 2025; 3. "Somebody Loves Me" Released: March 11, 2025; 4. "Die Trying" Released: April 18, 2025

Some Sexy Songs 4 U (stylized as $ome $exy $ongs 4 U or shortened to $$$4U) is a collaborative studio album by Canadian musicians PartyNextDoor and Drake. It was released on February 14, 2025, by OVO Sound, Santa Anna, and Republic Records. The album features guest appearances from Pimmie, Yebba, and Chino Pacas. Production on the album was handled by PartyNextDoor and Drake's frequent collaborators Noel Cadastre, Gordo, and Jordan Ullman of Majid Jordan, among others.

Originally set to release in late-2024, Some Sexy Songs 4 U was delayed multiple times. The album serves as a follow-up to the artists' respective studio albums PartyNextDoor 4 (2024) and For All the Dogs (2023). It marks PartyNextDoor's first collaborative project and Drake's third, after 2015's What a Time to Be Alive (with Future) and 2022's Her Loss (with 21 Savage). The album was released among the backdrop of Drake's ongoing legal dispute with Universal Music Group (UMG) and was his first full-length release following his feud with Kendrick Lamar. Some Sexy Songs 4 U was supported by four singles, including "Nokia" and "Die Trying". The pair embarked on the Some Special Shows 4 U tour in support of the album.

Some Sexy Songs 4 U opened with first-week sales of 246,000 album-equivalent units in the United States and debuted at number one on the Billboard 200, marking PartyNextDoor's first chart-topper and Drake's fourteenth, tying him with Jay-Z and Taylor Swift for the most number-one albums on the chart by solo artists. It also topped the albums chart in the artists' native of Canada. Internationally, it peaked in the top ten in Australia, Belgium, the Netherlands, Ireland, Lithuania, New Zealand, Norway, Sweden, Switzerland, and the United Kingdom. Upon its release, the album received mixed reviews from critics, who praised its production and intimate nature, but criticized the runtime and lyricism.

== Background ==
The album follows the pair's numerous collaborations since PartyNextDoor was signed to Drake's record label, OVO Sound, back in 2013, with the first of these being Drake's guest appearance on "Over Here" from PartyNextDoor's eponymous mixtape (2013). Alongside their collaborations, they have contributed to each other's individual songs as a writer or producer. PartyNextDoor supported the release of his album PartyNextDoor 4 (2024) through a twenty-four-stop Canada and U.S. live tour. On August 2, 2024, at the tour's stop at the Budweiser Stage in Toronto—the artists' hometown—Drake performed as a surprise guest, with his set foregoing any of the hip-hop tracks in his discography. He then announced the collaborative album, saying, "On behalf of me and Party, we've been working on something for y'all. So, you get the summer over with, you do what you need to do. I know all you girls are outside. When it gets a little chilly, PartyNextDoor and Drake album will be waiting right there for you".

Just two days later, the OVO Instagram page seemingly hinted at the album by posting backstage pictures of Drake and PartyNextDoor that was taken after the concert. During an interview on August 5, PartyNextDoor revealed that his favorite collaboration with Drake "[are] the [ones] we [are] doing right now. All 15 of them", seemingly revealing that the pair were working on 15 songs for the album. On August 6, Drake released 100 gigabytes of data, including behind-the-scenes clips, tour rehearsals, and studio footage. He also previewed three unreleased tracks (tracks of which what would later be released as the 100 Gigs) under an Instagram page by the name "plottttwistttttt". On August 7, video clips surfaced of nightclubs in Canada previewing unreleased music from the album. On the same day, via the "plottttwistttttt" Instagram account, Drake reposted a tweet, blurring out the words "album rollout" regarding another unheard track.

On October 5, Drake attended at Tyrone Edwards' Nostalgia Party in Toronto, where he called out his "fake friends" in the music industry and cited PartyNextDoor as a "real" friend. He also hinted at the album's impending release by saying "shoutout to my brother PX, album dropping soon". In an appearance on The Fry Yiy Show on SiriusXM that same month, OVO engineer, Noel Cadastre, stated that the album only required "finishing touches" and called November "a jam-packed month for me [to finish the album]". PartyNextDoor then revealed work on the album would continue after the conclusion of the European leg of his Sorry I'm Outside Tour on November 6, saying, "I have one more show on this tour, then the album is getting finished". During a Kick live stream with xQc on November 24, Drake stated the album was almost complete, saying, "[the] album is 75 percent done. Shout out to PX, cooking right now," and added that "the album sounds incredible... It's the sound people know and love us for". On December 26, Drake appeared on a Kick live stream with Adin Ross, in which he stated that the album is one of the records that he is "most proud of in [his] life". He also revealed that the album was supposed to release in November, but was delayed.

Some Sexy Songs 4 U's release follows legal action by Drake against Universal Music Group (UMG), the parent company of Republic Records, with whom Drake has a recording contract. In November 2024, Drake initiated a legal petition against UMG and Spotify in the U.S., alleging they conspired to artificially inflate the number of streams of the diss track, "Not Like Us" by Kendrick Lamar on the service during Drake's feud with Lamar earlier that year by implementing pay-to-play, malicious bots, and other tactics. Drake withdrew the petition on January 14, 2025, and filed a lawsuit in U.S. district court a day later, alleging defamation against UMG for promoting "Not Like Us". This legal dispute caused confusion regarding which label or company would act as the distributor for Some Sexy Songs 4 U. It was eventually released through OVO, Santa Anna, and Republic, each of which are the artists' labels, while it was distributed through Santa Anna (owned by Sony Music), but licensed to Republic.

== Artwork and promotion ==
On February 3, 2025, the album's title was revealed and its release date of February 14 was announced. The announcement included a snippet of "Deeper". On February 9, Drake shared a snippet of the song "Crying in Chanel". A day later, Drake shared a promotional skit for the album starring the Canadian comedic duo Jermaine and Trevaunn Richards, which depicted Trevaunn practicing a romantic speech with his brother for his girlfriend but being unable or unwilling to tell her that he loves her. According to Jon Powell of Revolt, this exemplifies the "playful, self-aware marketing that helped Drake maintain his cultural dominance for well over a decade". Drake previously collaborated with the Richards by making a cameo appearance in the duo's "T-Dot Goon Scrap DVD 2" comedy sketch in May 2017.

The following day, Drake shared the album's official cover art via Instagram, which depicted Drake (left) and PartyNextDoor (right) standing together during a snowstorm in front of Absolute World in Mississauga, Ontario, wearing oversized fur coats. On February 12, Drake shared a snippet of the track "Somebody Loves Me" on "@plottttwistttttt". He also shared a photo of the title page of December 2024-draft of a screenplay called "$$$ 4 U" (the acronym for the album title): it listed Drake and PartyNextDoor as its writers and that it was based on an unreleased novel of the same name by Drake's father, Dennis Graham. A day later, Drake revealed the album's 21-song tracklist via Instagram and confirmed its runtime to be 74 minutes.

In October 2025, PartyNextDoor released $$$, a short film inspired by the album.

== Controversy ==
On February 13, 2025, some social media users and Freddie Gibbs accused Drake and PartyNextDoor of plagiarizing use of the dollar symbol in the album's title and bunnies in its promotional material from Gibbs' album Soul Sold Separately (2022). Canadian rapper John River accused Drake and PartyNextDoor of plagiarizing the pose in front of Absolute World in the album's artwork from his music video to his 2021 single "Hope City II": he claimed PartyNextDoor and "another OVO artist" contacted him "obsessing" over his video and "thought process", but threatened to blackball him after River refused to act as a ghostwriter.

== Music and composition ==
Some Sexy Songs 4 U contains twenty-one tracks, with a playing time of over 73 minutes. Its album release coincides with Valentine's Day, marking Drake's third full-length project to be released near that date, after So Far Gone (2009) and If You're Reading This It's Too Late (2015); according to HotNewHipHop, Drake's albums released during this time "reflect his shifting perspectives on love, success, and emotional vulnerability", saying, "Few artists have aligned themselves with a holiday like Drake has with Valentine's Day".

=== Production ===
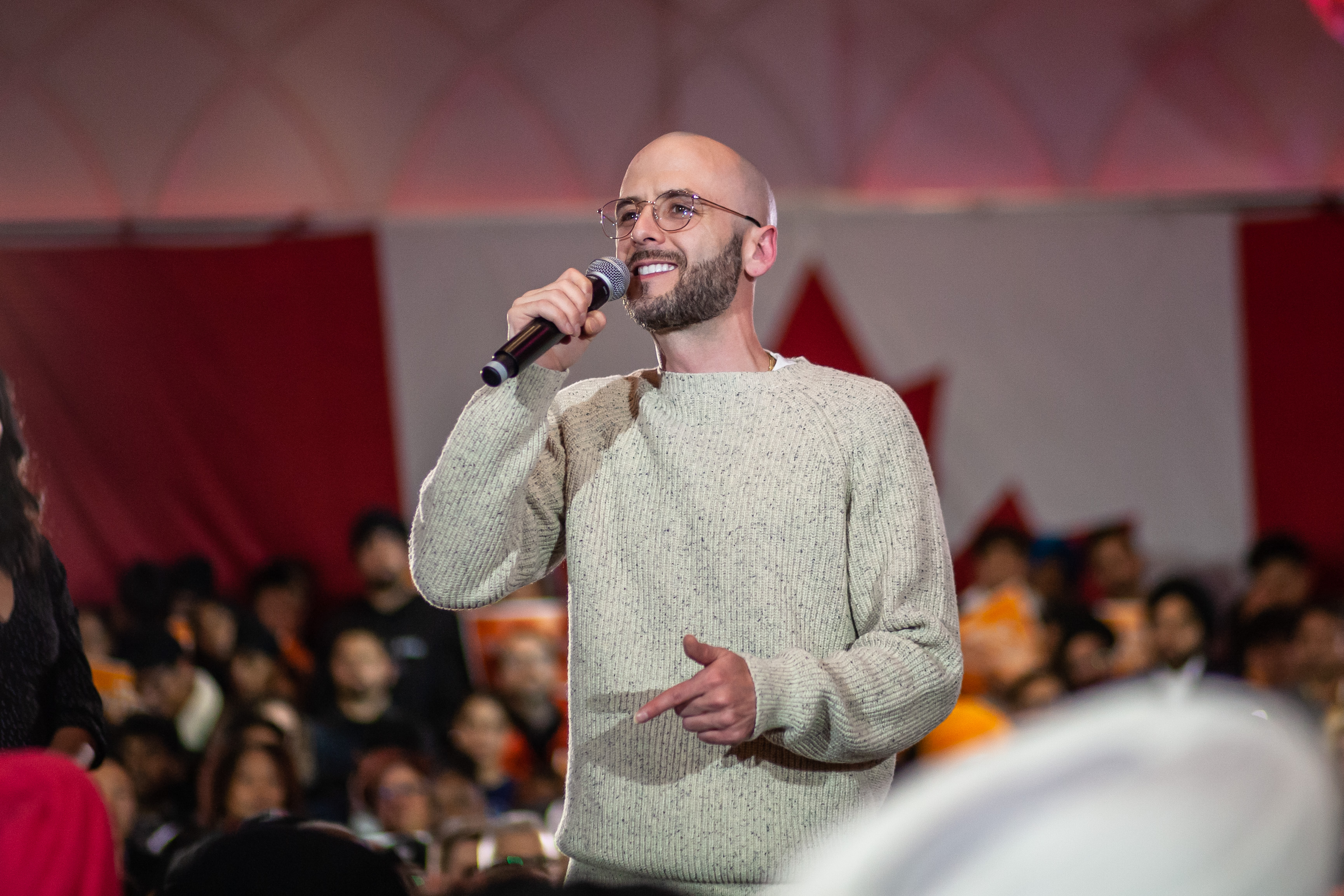
Some Sexy Songs 4 U is Drake's first album to not include longtime collaborator and friend 40 as a producer.

According to Will Schube and Kia Turner of Complex, Some Sexy Songs 4 U primarily mixes elements of contemporary R&B, hip-hop, and trap. It also explores alternative rock, acoustic pop, and regional Mexican on certain songs. The album features production from several different producers, which was handled primarily by Drake's longtime collaborators Noel Cadastre, Gordo, Jordan Ullman and PartyNextDoor himself, alongside PartyNextDoor's frequent collaborators Alex Lustig, Niketaz, and Niko.

=== Lyrics and themes ===
According to Joe Coscarelli of The New York Times, the lyrical themes on the album are reminiscent of both Drake and PartyNextDoor's previous works, including Drake's Dark Lane Demo Tapes (2020) and PartyNextDoor's PartyNextDoor 3 (2016). On the album, Drake takes several shots at other artists, including Kendrick Lamar and Joe Budden, while he makes references to Charli XCX and her album Brat (2024), 21 Savage, and Tate McRae.

Throughout the record, "Drake's attention remains primarily on the ladies" while PartyNextDoor "opens up about his sexual escapades", according to Billboard's Carl Lamarre and Michael Saponara. Drake covers the topics of a bachelor lifestyle, settling down, being turned on by his peers, and his previous sexual experiences. Similarly, PartyNextDoor covers themes of sex, money, infidelity, and sexual jealousy.

=== Songs ===
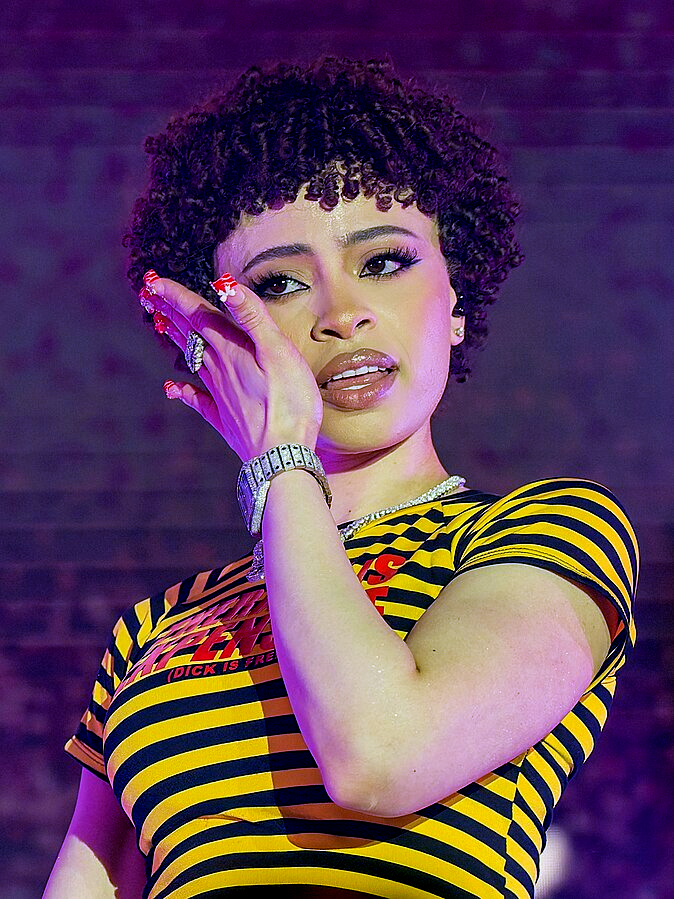
"Glorious" features uncredited vocal samples from a 2023 interview by Ice Spice.

In the album's opening song, "CN Tower", the two artists refer to the CN Tower, an observation tower in Toronto; it famously appears on the cover of Drake's fourth album Views (2016). They refer to the tower's lighting schedule at night. In "Spider-Man Superman", Drake and PartyNextDoor sample "The Real Her" by Drake, Lil Wayne, and André 3000. In the song, both artists refer to a relationship with a woman while acknowledging the fact "that they can't provide everything that may be asked of them". In "Deeper" (performed by PartyNextDoor), he "aims to be his girl's favorite and, ultimately, dives head-first without any fear of repercussion". In "Gimme a Hug" (performed by Drake), he addresses his feud with Kendrick Lamar while also taking shots at Budden and others who have turned on him during his feud. On February 18, Drake aired an unnamed song featuring New Orleans bounce artist Heaven via the "plottttwistttttt" Instagram account, hinting it was not included on Some Sexy Songs 4 U due to sample clearance issues related to its use of "Breakin' My Heart (Pretty Brown Eyes)" by Mint Condition.

== Critical reception ==
Professional ratings
Aggregate scores
Source	Rating
Metacritic	54/100
Review scores
Source	Rating
AllMusic	2.5/5 stars
Clash	5/10
Exclaim!	5/10
Financial Times	2/5 stars
Pitchfork	5.9/10
Rolling Stone	3.5/5 stars
Sputnikmusic	1.0/5

Some Sexy Songs 4 U was met with mixed reviews. At Metacritic, which assigns a rating out of 100 to reviews from professional publications, the album received a weighted average score of 54, based on 7 reviews, indicating "mixed or average reviews".

Revolt's Jon Powell praised Some Sexy Songs 4 U, saying "with its blend of moody soul, atmospheric production and candid lyricism, [the album] is arguably the magnum opus of [the artists'] decade-long creative partnership". Jeff Ihaza of Rolling Stone said the album offers fans of the artists' "breezy R&B sound plenty to grasp onto", calling the tracklist "well-executed [with] signature OVO-style hits". He also praised the artists for their "magnetic chemistry that jells on several moments on the record" and singled out "Nokia" and "Die Trying" as highlights, calling the latter "replete with catchy acoustic guitar and paired nicely with PartyNextDoor's soaring, elastically rhythmic vocals". In a joint review for Complex, Will Schube and Kia Turner stated Some Sexy Songs 4 U is "a playful, low stakes collection of slow jams [which] is laid back [and] frisky", and commented the artists are "in their ideal element", praising its production as offering a "silky smooth snowy listen". However, Schube critiqued Drake's increased presence over PartyNextDoor on the album and Turner wrote the songs are "more nostalgic than sexy." Exclaim!'s Alex Hudson singled out "Nokia", "Die Trying" and "Gimme a Hug" for praise, calling them "thoroughly fun", and labelled Some Sexy Songs 4 U as an improvement over Drake's previous efforts but criticized the runtime, concluding that the album represents a "very mild" victory for Drake.

In a mixed review, Clash's Robin Murray wrote that Some Sexy Songs 4 U "epitomises many of the faults lodged against Drake recently", critiquing its lyricism and length, but said "when the album works, it supplies more than enough highlights to grace a playlist update" and that it will resonate with the two artists' core fanbase: "there's always going to be pieces here that will thrill long-time fans". Stereogum's review was also mixed, saying "at their best, [Drake] and PartyNextDoor leverage their chemistry enough to escape the monotony of the production" but concluded that "the 73-minute runtime will make you want to escape like the throes of an awkward hookup." HotNewHipHop's Aron A. criticized Drake's contributions to the album, calling them "driven by ego and external validation [rather] than passion", but praised PartyNextDoor's efforts, saying he "offers a level of intimacy and vulnerability that Drake increasingly shies away from". Ludovic Hunter-Tilney for the Financial Times wrote that Drake is "ingenious" to use "playfulness and humour [as part of] a charm offensive" on the album to reframe the context of his feud with Lamar, praising its production, but ultimately called the execution "underwhelming", criticizing its runtime.

Pitchfork's Alphonse Pierre wrote that the record is Drake's "most R&B-centric" project since So Far Gone (2009) but criticized Drake's lyrics, singing, and PartyNextDoor's contributions, which he labelled "forgettable". Writing for The Hollywood Reporter in a negative review, Jonny Coleman described the record as a "bloated, 21-song snoozer", saying "there aren't really any highlights, and not too many lowlights" and described the music as "flat—no soul, no swing, no bangers, [and] no vibe". Dakota Foss of Sputnikmusic gave the album a negative review for containing misogynistic themes and for its similarity with Drake's previous albums, concluding "the [album] fails on every level". Chris Richards of The Washington Post criticized the lyrics, stating it "reverts [Drake] to his callous lothario factory settings", labelling the songs "easy to hate", and saying Some Sexy Songs 4 U sounds "defeated [and] familiarly bland [where] embarrassments jump out".

== Awards and nominations ==
Awards and nominations for Some Sexy Songs 4 U
Organization	Year	Category	Result	Ref.
American Music Awards	2025	Favorite R&B Album	Nominated	

== Commercial performance ==
Some Sexy Songs 4 U earned over 56.6 million first-day streams on the global Spotify chart, averaging over 2.5 million streams per song: this was the second-highest streaming debut of the year, around 1 million streams short from the number one, The Weeknd's Hurry Up Tomorrow. The album broke the first-day streaming record for the most streamed R&B/Soul album in the history of Apple Music.

In Party and Drake's home country of Canada, Some Sexy Songs 4 U debuted at number one on the Billboard Canadian Albums, marking Party's first and Drake's fifteenth number-one album in the country. The album debuted at number one on the US Billboard 200 with 246,000 album-equivalent units, including 25,000 pure album sales. It earned a total of 287.04 million on-demand streams in the debut week, which resulted in the largest streaming week of 2025 for any album. Some Sexy Songs 4 U is PartyNextDoor's first number-one album in the US and Drake's fourteenth, tying him with Jay-Z and Taylor Swift for the most number-one albums among soloists. All 21 tracks debuted on the Billboard Hot 100, with two appearing in the top ten. With Some Sexy Songs 4 U, Drake extended many of his Hot 100 chart records, including the most top-ten hits (80), top-20 entries (139), top 40 hits (216) and overall charted titles (358). In its second week, the album dropped to number two on the Billboard 200, moving 119,000 units. In its third week, it held its spot at number two on the chart, moving 90,000 units, before it dropped to number three in its fourth week, moving 79,000 units. As of January 2, 2026, the album was the eighth best-selling album of the 2025 year according to Hits, moved a total 1,766,000 album-equivalent units, including 66,000 pure album sales, 111,000 song sales, 2.192 billion audio-on-demand streams, and 97 million video-on-demand streams.

Internationally, the album debuted in the top ten of Australia, Belgium, the Netherlands, Ireland, Hungary, Lithuania, New Zealand, Norway, Sweden, and Switzerland, top twenty in France and Spain and top forty in Italy and Finland. All 21 tracks debuted on the Official South African Charts, with seven in the top ten. It debuted at number three on the UK Albums Chart, moving 20,746 album-equivalent units in its first week. The album marked Party's highest debut on the chart and became Drake's fourteenth top-ten.

== Track listing ==
Credits adapted from Tidal and the ASCAP and BMI Repertoire where applicable.

Some Sexy Songs 4 U track listing
No.	Title	Writer(s)	Producer(s)	Length
1.	"CN Tower"	Jahron Braithwaite; Aubrey Graham; Noel Cadastre; David Hughes; Kaushik Barua; Dwayne Carter; Stephen Garrett; Darius Harrison; James Scheffer; Rex Zamor	Cadastre; Prep Bijan; Kid Masterpiece	4:01
2.	"Moth Balls"	Braithwaite; Graham; Hughes; Harold Lewis; Asante Boreland; Eliel Brown; Octavian Godji	PartyNextDoor; Prep Bijan; DJ Lewis; Aiona; O Lil Angel; Eli	3:32
3.	"Something About You"	Braithwaite; Graham; James Cyr; Nyan Lieberthal; Markeith Thonger; Duncan Carolan; Dorien Johnson; Kareem Hussein; George Herrera; Omar Lupuku; Tyshane Thompson; Drew Ferguson	Nyan; London Cyr; Livewire; Reemz; Vawn; Kiyoshi	3:38
4.	"Crying in Chanel" (performed by Drake)	Braithwaite; Graham; Cadastre; Lewis; Godji; Tyler Nguyen	Cadastre; DJ Lewis; O Lil Angel; ProdbyTy	3:19
5.	"Spider-Man Superman"	Braithwaite; Graham; Cadastre; Lewis; Godji	Cadastre; DJ Lewis; O Lil Angel	3:23
6.	"Deeper" (performed by PartyNextDoor)	Brathwaite; Feliciano Ponce; Alexander Lustig; Mert Han; Robin Turrini; Harrissis Tsakmaklis; Luzian Tuetsch	Alex Lustig; Turrini; Room33; LAF Collective	2:52
7.	"Small Town Fame" (performed by Drake)	Graham; Jhené Aiko Chilombo; Benjamin Levin; Magnus Høiberg; Adam Feeney; Thomas Paxton; Celestine Amajoyi; Isaac Earl Bynum; Gentuar Memishi; Bennett Pepple; Marques Hutchison; Aliandro Prawl; Oriyomi Ojelade	Earl on the Beat; Gent!; Chibu; Ali Roots; Bangs; Skip2Fame; M3rge	2:28
8.	"Pimmie's Dilemma" (with Pimmie)	Phimphisa Truong; Godwin Ajayi	Imovekiloz	1:58
9.	"Brian Steel" (performed by Drake)	Graham; Lieberthal; Harley Arsenault; Donald Alford; Frederick Taylor; Keyshia Cole	Nyan; Arsenault	1:51
10.	"Gimme a Hug" (performed by Drake)	Graham; Cadastre; Barua; Simon Hessman; Johannes Klahr; Richard Zestenker; Diamanté Blackmon	Cadastre; Gordo; Kid Masterpiece; Klahr; Zestenker; Hessman	3:13
11.	"Raining in Houston" (performed by Drake)	Braithwaite; Graham; Cadastre; Barua	Cadastre; Kid Masterpiece	4:04
12.	"Lasers"	Braithwaite; Graham; David Hughes; Leonsio Muca; Nikita Iaremchuk; Tobias Rasmussen	Niko; Scandi; 29 Millions	3:18
13.	"Meet Your Padre" (with Chino Pacas)	Brathwaite; Graham; Lewis; Godji; Cristian Ávila; Jesús Ortiz Paz; Jose de Luna	DJ Lewis; O Lil Angel; JOP; de Luna	4:31
14.	"Nokia" (performed by Drake)	Graham; Paul Elkan	Elkan	4:01
15.	"Die Trying" (with Yebba)	Brathwaite; Graham; Abigail Smith; Jordan Ullman; Kenneth Ullman; Noah Smith; Blue Foley; Pearl Clarkin; Brock Butler	J. Ullman	3:15
16.	"Somebody Loves Me"	Braithwaite; Graham; Lewis; Godji; Phillip Boelhoff	DJ Lewis; O Lil Angel; Wondra030	3:02
17.	"Celibacy"	Braithwaite; Graham; Cadastre; Barua	Cadastre; Kid Masterpiece	3:55
18.	"OMW"	Braithwaite; Graham; Cadastre	Cadastre	3:53
19.	"Glorious"	Braithwaite; Graham; Godji; Lewis; Cadastre; Embrack Jevhaun; Maxime Breton; Isis Gaston	Cadastre; DJ Lewis; O Lil Angel; Nasamadeit; Mighty Max	3:25
20.	"When He's Gone"	Braithwaite; Graham; Muca; Nathaniel Kim; Nicola Kollar	Niko; Crater; Niketaz	3:29
21.	"Greedy"	Braithwaite; Graham; Arsenault; Barua; Cadastre; Elijah Fox-Peck	Cadastre; Kid Masterpiece; Arsenault	6:26
Total length:				73:30

Notes

- All tracks are stylized in all caps.

Sample and interpolation credits

- "CN Tower" contains samples of "Lollipop", written by Dwayne Carter, Stephen Garrett, Darius Harrison, Rex Zamor, and Jim Jonsin, as performed by Lil Wayne and Static Major.
- "Spider-Man Superman" contains samples of "The Real Her", written by Aubrey Graham, Dwayne Carter, Noah Shebib and André Benjamin, as performed by Drake, Lil Wayne, and André 3000.
- "Gimme a Hug" contains samples from "I Miss You", written by Aaron Hall and Gregory Cauthen, as performed by Hall.
- "Nokia" contains an interpolation of the Nokia tune, composed by Francisco Tárrega.

== Personnel ==
Musicians

- Drake – vocals (tracks 1–5, 7, 9–21)
- PartyNextDoor – vocals (tracks 1–3, 5, 6, 12, 13, 15–21), background vocals (11), keyboards (2)
- Hassan Phills – background vocals (track 7)
- Paul Omar "Elkan" Agyei – background vocals (track 14), additional vocals (14), keyboards (14)
- Destiny Nowell – background vocals (track 16)
- Noel Cadastre – keyboards (tracks 1, 4, 5, 10, 11, 17–19, 21)
- Prep Bijan – keyboards (tracks 1, 2, 17)
- Kid Masterpiece – keyboards (tracks 1, 10, 11, 21), guitar (11)
- Asante "Aiona" Boreland – keyboards (track 2)
- DJ Lewis – keyboards (tracks 2, 4, 5, 13, 16, 19)
- Eli Brown – keyboards (track 2)
- O Lil Angel – keyboards (tracks 2, 4, 5, 13, 16, 19)
- Duncan "Kiyoshi" Carolan – keyboards (track 3)
- Dorien "Livewire" Johnson – keyboards (track 3)
- London Cyr – keyboards (track 3)
- Kareem "Reemz" Hussein – keyboards (track 3)
- Marketih "Vawn" Thonger – keyboards (track 3)
- Nyan Liberthal – keyboards (tracks 3, 9)
- Alex Lustig – keyboards (track 6)
- Feliciano "Feli Ciano" Ecar – keyboards (track 6)
- Mert "Room33" Han – keyboards (track 6)
- Robin Turrini – keyboards (track 6)
- Harissis "Aki" Tsakmakils – keyboards (track 6)
- Luzian "Luz" Tuetsch – keyboards (track 6)
- Aliandro Prawl – keyboards (track 7)
- Ajak "Bangs" Chol – keyboards (track 7)
- Chibu Amajoyi – keyboards (track 7)
- Isaac "Earl" Bynum – keyboards (track 7)
- Gentuar "GENT!" Memishi – keyboards (track 7)
- Oriyomi "Skip2Fame" Ojelade – keyboards (track 7)
- Marques "M3rge" Hutchinson – keyboards (track 7)
- Godwin "Imovekiloz" Ajayi – keyboards (track 8)
- Harley Arsenault – keyboards (tracks 9, 21)
- Gordo – keyboards (track 10)
- Johannes Klahr – keyboards (track 10)
- Richard "LIOHN" Zastenker – keyboards (track 10)
- Simon Hessman – keyboards (track 10)
- Nikita "29millions" Laremchuk – keyboards (track 12)
- Leonsio "Niko" Muca – keyboards (tracks 12, 20)
- Tobias "Scandi" Rasmussen – keyboards (track 12)
- Jose "Meño" De Luna – keyboards (track 13)
- Jesús "JOP" Ortiz Paz – keyboards (track 13)
- Jordan Ullman – keyboards (track 15)
- Philip Böllhoff – keyboards (track 16)
- Embrack "Nasamadeit" Jevhaun – keyboards (track 19)
- Nicola "Niketaz" Kollar – keyboards (track 20)
- Nathaniel "Crater" Kim – keyboards (track 20)
- Godwin Sonzi – guitar (track 5)
- Kenneth Ullman – guitar (track 15)

Technical

- Chris Athens – mastering
- Noel Cadastre – mixing (tracks 1, 4–10, 12–14, 16, 18–21), engineering (1–5, 7, 9–21)
- Alex Tumay – mixing (tracks 2, 3, 6, 13, 17)
- 40 – mixing (tracks 10, 11, 15)
- Prep Bijan – engineering (tracks 1–3, 5, 6, 11–13, 15–21)
- Dave Huffman – mastering assistance
- Oupsing – mixing assistance (tracks 10, 15)

== Charts ==
=== Weekly charts ===
Weekly chart performance for Some Sexy Songs 4 U
Chart (2025)	Peak position
Australian Albums (ARIA)	2
Australian Hip Hop/R&B Albums (ARIA)	1
Austrian Albums (Ö3 Austria)	9
Belgian Albums (Ultratop Flanders)	5
Belgian Albums (Ultratop Wallonia)	9
Canadian Albums (Billboard)	1
Danish Albums (Hitlisten)	2
Dutch Albums (Album Top 100)	4
Finnish Albums (Suomen virallinen lista)	36
French Albums (SNEP)	14
German Albums (Offizielle Top 100)	31
Hungarian Albums (MAHASZ)	10
Icelandic Albums (Tónlistinn)	3
Irish Albums (Official Charts)	2
Italian Albums (FIMI)	34
Japanese Dance & Soul Albums (Oricon)	11
Japanese Hot Albums (Billboard Japan)	88
Lithuanian Albums (AGATA)	10
New Zealand Albums (RMNZ)	2
Nigerian Albums (TurnTable)	4
Norwegian Albums (VG-lista)	2
Scottish Albums (Official Charts)	98
Spanish Albums (PROMUSICAE)	14
Swedish Albums (Sverigetopplistan)	6
Swiss Albums (Schweizer Hitparade)	3
UK Albums (Official Charts)	3
UK R&B Albums (Official Charts)	2
US Billboard 200	1
US Top R&B/Hip-Hop Albums (Billboard)	1

=== Monthly charts ===
Monthly chart performance for Some Sexy Songs 4 U
Chart (2025)	Position
Japanese Dance & Soul Albums (Oricon)	21

=== Year-end charts ===
Year-end chart performance for Some Sexy Songs 4 U
Chart (2025)	Position
Australian Albums (ARIA)	36
Belgian Albums (Ultratop Flanders)	116
Canadian Albums (Billboard)	14
Dutch Albums (Album Top 100)	51
Icelandic Albums (Tónlistinn)	63
New Zealand Albums (RMNZ)	31
Swiss Albums (Schweizer Hitparade)	75
UK Albums (OCC)	50
US Billboard 200	12
US Top R&B/Hip-Hop Albums (Billboard)	4

== Certifications ==
Certifications for Some Sexy Songs 4 U
Region	Certification	Certified units/sales
Canada (Music Canada)	2× Platinum	160,000^{‡}
Denmark (IFPI Danmark)	Gold	10,000^{‡}
New Zealand (RMNZ)	Gold	7,500^{‡}
Portugal (AFP)	Gold	3,500^{‡}
United Kingdom (BPI)	Gold	100,000^{‡}
United States (RIAA)	Platinum	1,000,000^{‡}
^{‡} Sales+streaming figures based on certification alone.

== Release history ==
Release dates and formats for Some Sexy Songs 4 U
Region	Date	Label(s)	Format(s)	Edition(s)	Ref.
Various	February 14, 2025	OVO; Santa Anna; Republic	Digital download; streaming	Standard	
United States	February 16, 2025	OVO; Santa Anna; Republic	CD	Standard	
Various	February 18, 2025	OVO; Santa Anna; Republic	CD	Standard	
Various	May 9, 2025	OVO; Santa Anna; Republic	LP; Cassette	Standard	

== See also ==
- List of Billboard 200 number-one albums of 2025
- List of number-one albums of 2025 (Canada)
- 2025 in hip-hop
- 2025 in rhythm and blues
