= CN Tower (song) =

Song by PartyNextDoor and Drake

from the album Some Sexy Songs 4 U
- Released: February 14, 2025
- Recorded: 2024
- Studio: S.O.T.A (Florida); Sanctuary (Nassau)
- Genre: R&B
- Length: 4:02
- Label: Santa Anna; OVO; Republic
- Songwriters: Jahron Brathwaite; Aubrey Graham; Kaushik Barua; Noel Cadastre; Dwayne Carter; Stephen Garrett; Darius Harrison; David Hughes; James Scheffer; Rex Zamor
- Producers: Noel Cadastre; Prep; Kid Masterpiece

"CN Tower" is a song by Canadian musicians PartyNextDoor and Drake. It is the first track from their collaborative studio album Some Sexy Songs 4 U. Written by Drake and PartyNextDoor and produced by Noel Cadastre, Prep, and Kid Masterpiece, it was released on February 14, 2025, by Santa Anna Label Group, OVO Sound and Republic Records.

== Composition ==
The songs beat is described as a "mellow R&B beat, blending atmospheric synths, deep bass, and slow, rhythmic percussion." Throughout the track slight variations in the instrumentation and layering, ambient synths and reverb-drenched textures ebb and flow, adding emotional depth and keeping the composition from feeling repetitive.

"CN Tower" contains a sample from Lil Wayne and Static Major’s 2008 single, "Lollipop".

== Critical reception ==
The song received positive reviews. Billboard's Michael Saponara and Carl Lamarre ranked the song as the eighth best track on Some Sexy Songs 4 U. Lamarre wrote "Drake's penchant for memorable intros continues with this one, as heartbreak enters the conversation for him and PND. The CN Tower, a symbol of Toronto, adds a local flavor to the song."

== Credits and personnel ==
Credits were adapted from the liner notes.

Recording

- S.O.T.A Studios – Florida, United States
- Sanctuary Studios – Nassau, The Bahamas

Musicians

- Drake – vocals, songwriter
- PartyNextDoor – vocals, songwriter

Technical

- Chris Athens – mastering engineer
- Noel Cadastre – recording engineer, mixing engineer
- Dave Huffman – assistant mastering engineer
- Prep Bijan – engineering

== Charts ==
Chart performance for "CN Tower"
Chart (2025)	Peak position
Australia (ARIA)	38
Canada Hot 100 (Billboard)	13
Global 200 (Billboard)	26
New Zealand Hot Singles (RMNZ)	5
South Africa Streaming (TOSAC)	2
UK Singles (OCC)	22
UK Hip Hop/R&B (OCC)	7
US Billboard Hot 100	18
US Hot R&B/Hip-Hop Songs (Billboard)	9

== Certifications ==
Certifications for "CN Tower"
Region	Certification	Certified units/sales
Canada (Music Canada)	Gold	40,000^{‡}
United States (RIAA)	Gold	500,000^{‡}
^{‡} Sales+streaming figures based on certification alone.
