= Some of Your Love =

2026 single by PartyNextDoor

Single by PartyNextDoor

from the album PartyNextDoor 3 (10-Year Edition)
- Released: August 21, 2026
- Genre: R&B
- Length: 2:39
- Label: OVO Sound
- Songwriters: Jahron Brathwaite; Jordan Evans; Jordon Manswell; J'vell Boyce; J. Tatum; R. Dumas; Jean-Jacques Debout
- Producers: Jordan Evans; Jordon Manswell; J'vell Boyce

PartyNextDoor singles chronology
"Die Trying" (2025)	"Some of Your Love" (2026)

"Some of Your Love" is a song by Canadian singer PartyNextDoor from PartyNextDoor 3 (10-Year Edition), the tenth anniversary edition of his second studio album PartyNextDoor 3 (2016). An R&B song set to an "ethereal" melody, it premiered on Drake's Apple Music radio show OVO Sound Radio in 2015.

== Charts ==
Weekly chart performance for "Some of Your Love"
Chart (2026)	Peak position
Australia (ARIA)	32
Canada Hot 100 (Billboard)	28
New Zealand Hot Singles (RMNZ)	22
South Africa Streaming (TOSAC)	52
US Billboard Hot 100	36
US Hot R&B/Hip-Hop Songs (Billboard)	7
