= Anita Max Win Tour =

2025 concert tour by Drake

- Tour by Drake
- Location: Australia
- Start date: February 4, 2025
- End date: February 25, 2025 (Note: Set to span 16 shows and conclude on March 16, 2025, the tour's final four shows were postponed on February 25 and an undetermined number of extra dates were set to be added. The tour was officially cancelled on July 29.)
- Legs: 2
- No. of shows: 12
- Supporting act: DJ Spade
- Attendance: 200,396 (12 shows)
- Box office: $30.3 million (12 shows)

Drake concert chronology
- It's All a Blur Tour (2023–2024); Anita Max Win Tour (2025); Some Special Shows 4 U (2025)

The Anita Max Win Tour was the seventh headlining concert tour by Canadian rapper Drake. It commenced on February 4, 2025, in Perth and concluded on February 25.

The tour was announced on November 29, 2024, with seven dates across Melbourne, Sydney, Brisbane, and Auckland. The total number of shows was doubled by December 18, introducing a two-date stopover in Perth, and on January 14, 2025, further shows were added in Sydney and Brisbane. On January 29, the Auckland dates, originally set for February 28 and March 1, 2025, were rescheduled to conclude the tour on March 16.

On February 25, the final four shows were abruptly postponed due to scheduling conflicts and were originally set to be rescheduled, with additional shows planned, however, the remaining dates were ultimately cancelled on July 29.

== Background ==
The tour, which is Drake's first in Oceania in eight years, since the Boy Meets World Tour (2017), is named after the "Anita Max Wynn" character first introduced by Drake on a December 2023 Kick live stream: the character's name is a pun on the gambling phrase "I need a max win", which refers to hitting the maximum payout on a slot machine.

The tour was announced on November 29, 2024, with seven dates across Melbourne, Sydney, Brisbane, and Auckland. Due to overwhelming demand, this was doubled by December 18, with additional shows added in Australia, including the introduction of a two-date stopover in Perth. The tour was extended on January 14, 2025 to include further shows in Sydney and Brisbane. On January 29, the Auckland dates were rescheduled from February 28 and March 1, 2025, to March 15 and March 16, respectively, due to scheduling conflicts. On February 25, the tour, which was set to conclude on March 16, in Auckland, was abruptly cancelled due to scheduling conflicts: the affected dates are set to be rescheduled, with a spokesperson for Drake confirming that further shows are also planned, although, dates are yet to be determined. Ticket holders were given the option of keeping their tickets for the new dates or requesting refunds. On July 29, the remaining dates were officially cancelled, citing scheduling conflicts.

According to The Courier-Mail, key stage equipment, including the central clear walkway used for the main performance, was shipped to Europe at the end of February and arrived in the continent by late April 2025. Georgia Clelland of The Courier-Mail speculated this may indicate a European leg of the tour to either begin or conclude with Drake's rumored appearance as headliner for Wireless Festival in London in July 2025. In February 2025, Drake was announced as the headliner for all three nights of the festival, with each night featuring a different setlist. It also marks his first UK performance in six years and first headlining Wireless performance since 2012. All tickets sold out within minutes, setting the record for the fastest sale of tickets in festival history.

== Concert synopsis ==
An Anita Max Win Tour show consists of between 40 and 42 songs and lasts just over 2 hours, with Drake addressing the crowd throughout the show. The songs are broadly played in order of release from each studio album (except for 2010's Thank Me Later) of his discography. Select songs which contain guest appearances by Drake are also performed, as well as live debuts of some songs. The concert staging features Drake performing on a giant, lateral clear walkway, and includes direct audience interactions, including performing within the general admission pit for "God's Plan".

Prior to the start of the show, Drake enters the arena through the crowd by descending its steps flanked by security. He wears a custom-made hoodie covered in bulletholes, with smoke also flowing from the back of the garment, while the instrumental for "Over My Dead Body" plays. According to David Friend of The Canadian Press, the attire and show introduction symbolizes that Drake is "still standing" following his publicized rap feud with Kendrick Lamar and other artists in 2024.

== Reception ==
The tour's legs in Australia and New Zealand, Drake's first in the region in eight years, received mixed reviews, with praise for Drake's performances and fan engagement, but criticism for its logistical challenges, specifically its ticketing concerns and abrupt scheduling adjustments.

The tour attracted widespread attention for Drake giving out large sums of money to some concertgoers during the shows: at the first two Melbourne dates, he gave away $45,000. This led to several subsequent ticketholders at other dates appearing with signs asking for financial aid, which Brenna Cooper of LADbible labelled as "genuinely dystopian".

== Set list ==
This set list was taken from the show in Perth on February 4, 2025. It does not represent all shows throughout the tour.

1. "Over My Dead Body" (Instrumental)
2. "Marvins Room"
3. "Headlines"
4. "HYFR (Hell Ya Fucking Right)"
5. "The Motto"
6. "She Will" (Drake's contributions only)
7. "Love Me" (Drake's contributions only)
8. "Pound Cake / Paris Morton Music 2" (Instrumental)
9. "Started from the Bottom"
10. "Hold On, We're Going Home"
11. "My Way (Remix)" (Drake's contributions only)
12. "Energy"
13. "Know Yourself"
14. "Hotline Bling"
15. "Feel No Ways"
16. "Childs Play"
17. "Controlla"
18. "One Dance"
19. "Passionfruit"
20. "Fake Love"
21. "God's Plan"
22. "Nonstop"
23. "In My Feelings"
24. "Nice for What"
25. "Ratchet Happy Birthday"
26. "Sicko Mode" (Drake's contributions only)
27. "No Guidance" (Drake's contributions only)
28. "Laugh Now Cry Later"
29. "What's Next"
30. "Wants and Needs"
31. "Girls Want Girls"
32. "Knife Talk"
33. "Massive"
34. "Jimmy Cooks"
35. "Rich Flex"
36. "Search & Rescue"
37. "Rich Baby Daddy"
38. "IDGAF"
39. "You Broke My Heart"
40. "No Face"
41. "Circadian Rhythm"
42. "Yebba's Heartbreak" (Instrumental)

Notes

- On the February 12 show in Melbourne, Drake performed "Recognize" and "Come and See Me" with PartyNextDoor.
- On the February 25 show in Brisbane, Drake performed "Nokia" as a surprise song.

== Tour dates ==
List of 2025 concerts, showing date, city, country, and venue
Date	City	Country	Venue	Supporting act	Attendance	Revenue
February 4, 2025	Perth	Australia	RAC Arena	DJ Spade	28,661 / 28,661 (100%)	$4,079,422
February 5, 2025	Perth	Australia	RAC Arena	DJ Spade	28,661 / 28,661 (100%)	$4,079,422
February 9, 2025	Melbourne	Australia	Rod Laver Arena	DJ Spade	71,315 / 71,315 (100%)	$10,506,568
February 10, 2025	Melbourne	Australia	Rod Laver Arena	DJ Spade	71,315 / 71,315 (100%)	$10,506,568
February 12, 2025	Melbourne	Australia	Rod Laver Arena	DJ Spade	71,315 / 71,315 (100%)	$10,506,568
February 13, 2025	Melbourne	Australia	Rod Laver Arena	DJ Spade	71,315 / 71,315 (100%)	$10,506,568
February 16, 2025	Sydney	Australia	Qudos Bank Arena	DJ Spade	74,267 / 74,267 (100%)	$11,638,449
February 17, 2025	Sydney	Australia	Qudos Bank Arena	DJ Spade	74,267 / 74,267 (100%)	$11,638,449
February 19, 2025	Sydney	Australia	Qudos Bank Arena	DJ Spade	74,267 / 74,267 (100%)	$11,638,449
February 20, 2025	Sydney	Australia	Qudos Bank Arena	DJ Spade	74,267 / 74,267 (100%)	$11,638,449
February 24, 2025	Brisbane	Australia	Brisbane Entertainment Centre	DJ Spade	26,153 / 26,153 (100%)	$4,105,596
February 25, 2025	Brisbane	Australia	Brisbane Entertainment Centre	DJ Spade	26,153 / 26,153 (100%)	$4,105,596
Total					200,396	$30,330,035

== Cancelled shows ==
List of cancelled concerts, showing date, city, country, venue, and reason for cancellation
Date	City	Country	Venue	Reason
March 4, 2025 (Note: The third show in Brisbane was originally set to be rescheduled until being cancelled.)	Brisbane	Australia	Brisbane Entertainment Centre	Scheduling conflicts
March 7, 2025 (Note: The fifth show in Sydney was originally set to be rescheduled until being cancelled.)	Sydney	Australia	Qudos Bank Arena	Scheduling conflicts
March 15, 2025 (Note: The first show in Auckland, originally set for February 28, 2025, was rescheduled to March 15; it was further set to be rescheduled until being cancelled.)	Auckland	New Zealand	Spark Arena	Scheduling conflicts
March 16, 2025 (Note: The second show in Auckland, originally set for March 1, 2025, was rescheduled to March 16; it was further set to be rescheduled until being cancelled.)	Auckland	New Zealand	Spark Arena	Scheduling conflicts
