= List of number-one albums of 2025 (Canada) =

These are the Canadian number-one albums of 2025. The chart is compiled by Luminate and published in Billboard magazine as Top Canadian Albums.

== Number-one albums ==
Key
†	Indicates best-performing album of 2025

List of number-one albums
Issue date	Album	Artist(s)	Ref.
January 4	Christmas	Michael Bublé	
January 11	SOS	SZA	
January 18	SOS	SZA	
January 25	SOS	SZA	
February 1	SOS	SZA	
February 8	SOS	SZA	
February 15	Hurry Up Tomorrow	The Weeknd	
February 22	Hurry Up Tomorrow	The Weeknd	
March 1	Some Sexy Songs 4 U	PartyNextDoor and Drake	
March 8	So Close to What	Tate McRae	
March 15	So Close to What	Tate McRae	
March 22	Mayhem	Lady Gaga	
March 29	Music	Playboi Carti	
April 5	Music	Playboi Carti	
April 12	Eternal Sunshine	Ariana Grande	
April 19	Some Sexy Songs 4 U	PartyNextDoor and Drake	
April 26	Some Sexy Songs 4 U	PartyNextDoor and Drake	
May 3	The Highlights	The Weeknd	
May 10	The Highlights	The Weeknd	
May 17	The Highlights	The Weeknd	
May 24	Even in Arcadia	Sleep Token	
May 31	I'm the Problem †	Morgan Wallen	
June 7	I'm the Problem †	Morgan Wallen	
June 14	I'm the Problem †	Morgan Wallen	
June 21	I'm the Problem †	Morgan Wallen	
June 28	I'm the Problem †	Morgan Wallen	
July 5	I'm the Problem †	Morgan Wallen	
July 12	I'm the Problem †	Morgan Wallen	
July 19	I'm the Problem †	Morgan Wallen	
July 26	Swag	Justin Bieber	
August 2	I'm the Problem †	Morgan Wallen	
August 9	I'm the Problem †	Morgan Wallen	
August 16	I'm the Problem †	Morgan Wallen	
August 23	KPop Demon Hunters (Soundtrack from the Netflix Film)	Various artists	
August 30	KPop Demon Hunters (Soundtrack from the Netflix Film)	Various artists	
September 6	KPop Demon Hunters (Soundtrack from the Netflix Film)	Various artists	
September 13	Man's Best Friend	Sabrina Carpenter	
September 20	Man's Best Friend	Sabrina Carpenter	
September 27	I'm the Problem †	Morgan Wallen	
October 4	KPop Demon Hunters (Soundtrack from the Netflix Film)	Various artists	
October 11	KPop Demon Hunters (Soundtrack from the Netflix Film)	Various artists	
October 18	The Life of a Showgirl	Taylor Swift	
October 25	The Life of a Showgirl	Taylor Swift	
November 1	The Life of a Showgirl	Taylor Swift	
November 8	The Life of a Showgirl	Taylor Swift	
November 15	The Life of a Showgirl	Taylor Swift	
November 22	The Life of a Showgirl	Taylor Swift	
November 29	The Life of a Showgirl	Taylor Swift	
December 6	The Life of a Showgirl	Taylor Swift	
December 13	The Life of a Showgirl	Taylor Swift	
December 20	The Life of a Showgirl	Taylor Swift	
December 27	Christmas	Michael Bublé	

== See also ==
- List of Canadian Hot 100 number-one singles of 2025
