= List of Canadian Hot 100 number-one singles of 2025 =

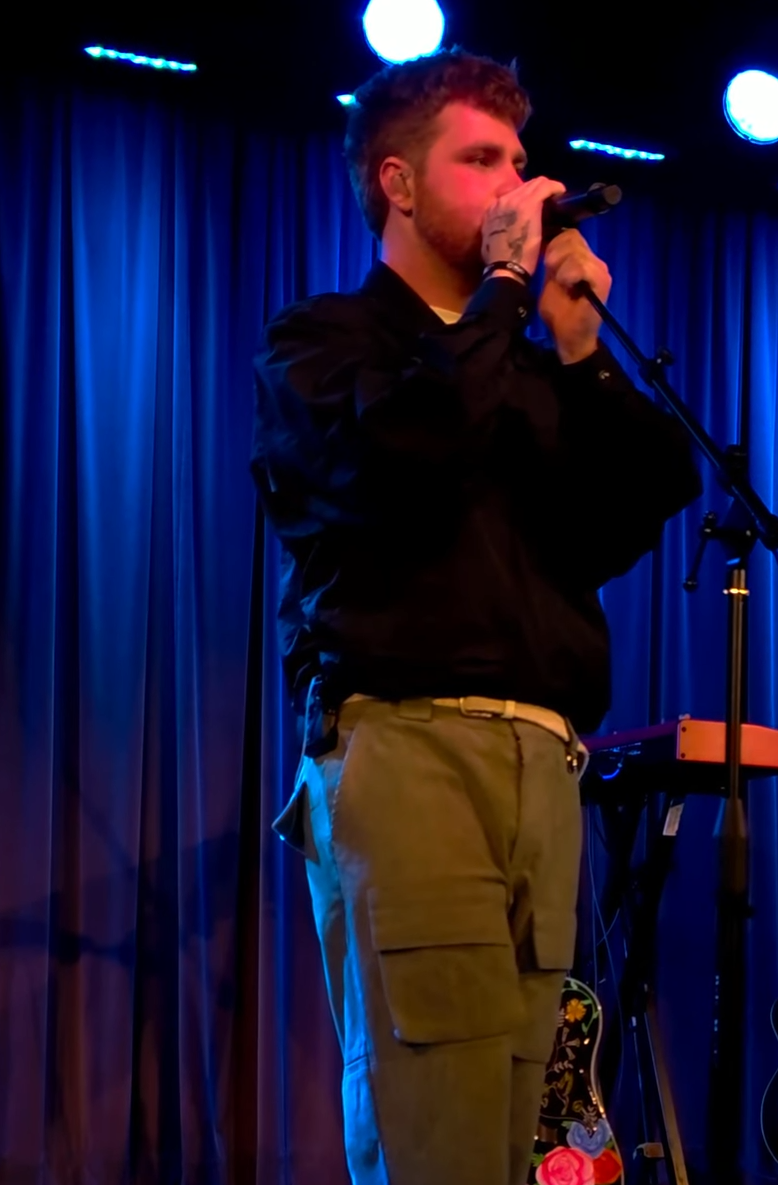
"Ordinary" by Alex Warren (pictured) is the longest-running number-one song of 2025, spending 21 consecutive weeks atop the Canadian Hot 100.

This is a list of the Canadian Hot 100 number-one singles of 2025. The Canadian Hot 100 is a chart that ranks the best-performing singles of Canada. Its data, published by Billboard magazine and compiled by Luminate, is based collectively on each single's weekly physical and digital sales, as well as airplay and streaming.

== Chart history ==
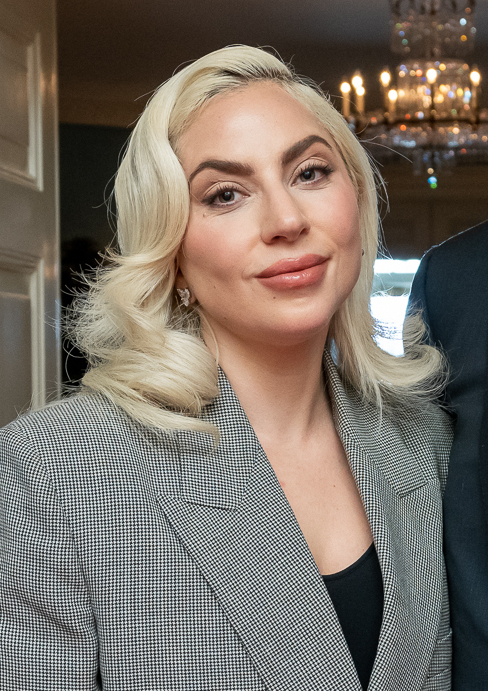
Lady Gaga (pictured) spent six consecutive weeks at number one with the single, "Die with a Smile", her duet with Bruno Mars.

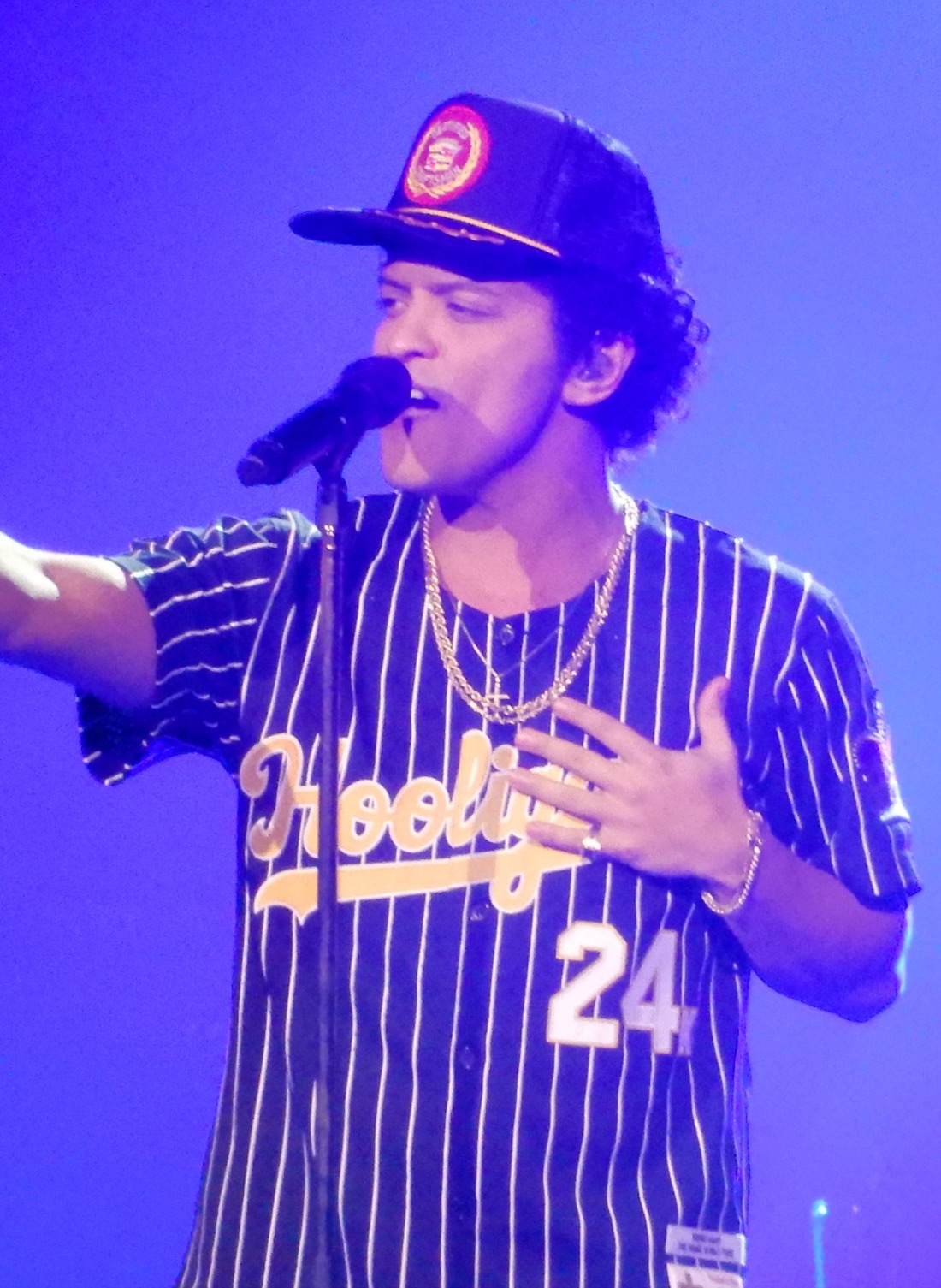
Bruno Mars (pictured) scored two number-one songs, the most of any artist this year with "Die with a Smile" and "APT.".

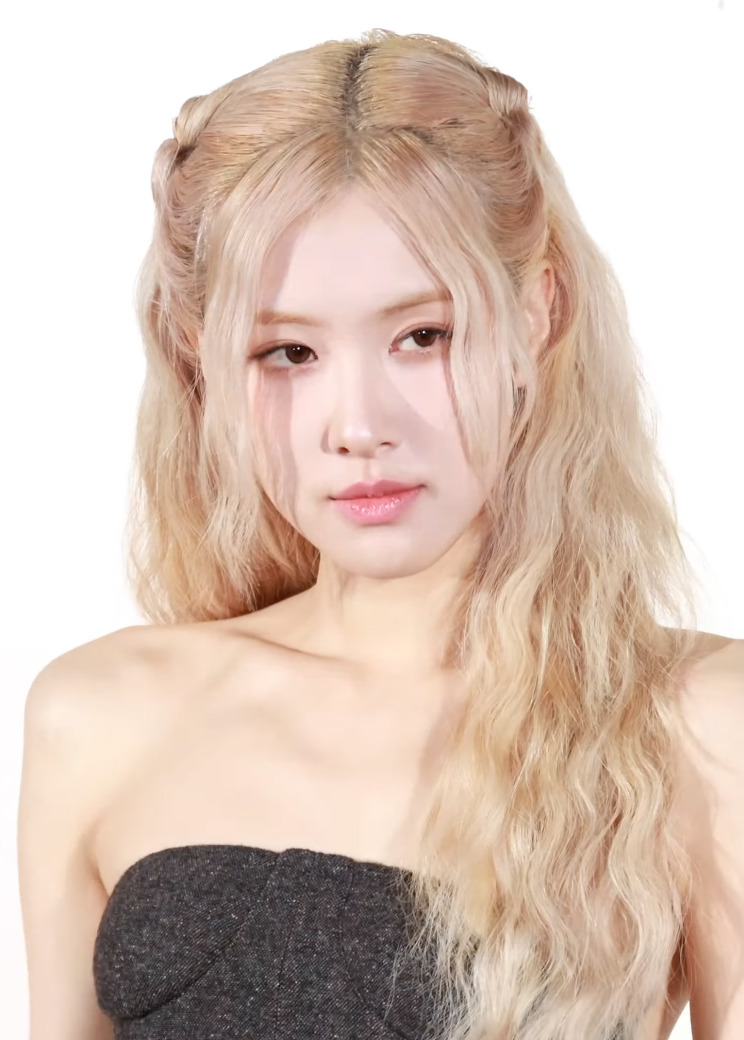
Rosé (pictured) became the first female K-pop artist to earn a number-one song with the Bruno Mars collaboration, "APT.", which spent seven consecutive weeks atop the chart.

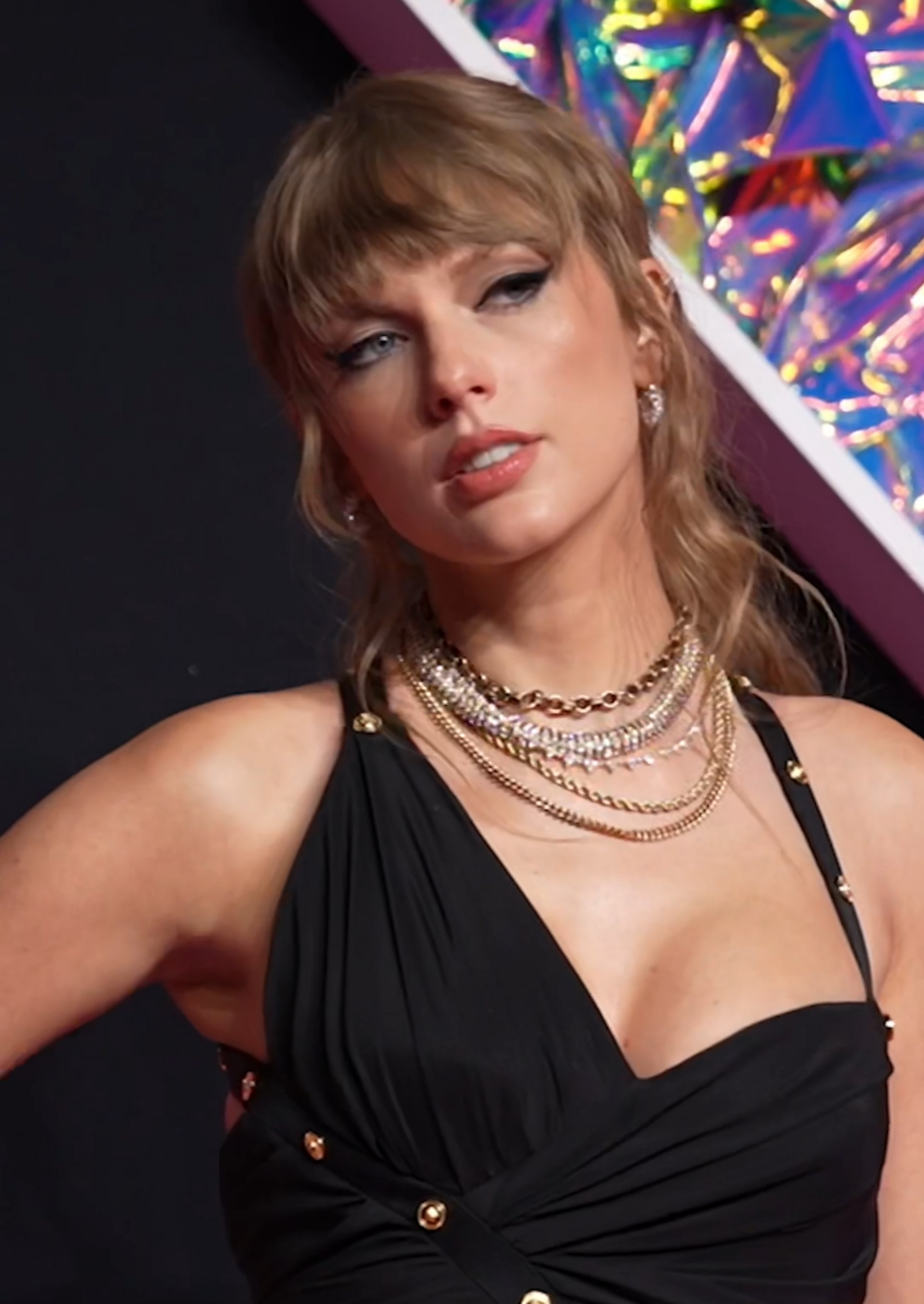
Taylor Swift (pictured) earned her 13th number-one song with "The Fate of Ophelia", tying for the most on the Canadian Hot 100. The single spent 10 weeks atop the chart.

The best-performing song of 2025, "A Bar Song (Tipsy)" by Shaboozey, peaked at number one on the Canadian Hot 100 chart dated May 11, 2024.

List of number-one songs
No.	Issue date	Song	Artist(s)	Ref.
re	January 4	"All I Want for Christmas Is You"	Mariah Carey	
209	January 11	"Die with a Smile"	Lady Gaga and Bruno Mars	
209	January 18	"Die with a Smile"	Lady Gaga and Bruno Mars	
209	January 25	"Die with a Smile"	Lady Gaga and Bruno Mars	
209	February 1	"Die with a Smile"	Lady Gaga and Bruno Mars	
209	February 8	"Die with a Smile"	Lady Gaga and Bruno Mars	
209	February 15	"Die with a Smile"	Lady Gaga and Bruno Mars	
210	February 22	"Not Like Us"	Kendrick Lamar	
211	March 1	"APT."	Rosé and Bruno Mars	
211	March 8	"APT."	Rosé and Bruno Mars	
211	March 15	"APT."	Rosé and Bruno Mars	
211	March 22	"APT."	Rosé and Bruno Mars	
211	March 29	"APT."	Rosé and Bruno Mars	
211	April 5	"APT."	Rosé and Bruno Mars	
211	April 12	"APT."	Rosé and Bruno Mars	
212	April 19	"Ordinary"	Alex Warren	
212	April 26	"Ordinary"	Alex Warren	
212	May 3	"Ordinary"	Alex Warren	
212	May 10	"Ordinary"	Alex Warren	
212	May 17	"Ordinary"	Alex Warren	
212	May 24	"Ordinary"	Alex Warren	
212	May 31	"Ordinary"	Alex Warren	
212	June 7	"Ordinary"	Alex Warren	
212	June 14	"Ordinary"	Alex Warren	
212	June 21	"Ordinary"	Alex Warren	
212	June 28	"Ordinary"	Alex Warren	
212	July 5	"Ordinary"	Alex Warren	
212	July 12	"Ordinary"	Alex Warren	
212	July 19	"Ordinary"	Alex Warren	
212	July 26	"Ordinary"	Alex Warren	
212	August 2	"Ordinary"	Alex Warren	
212	August 9	"Ordinary"	Alex Warren	
212	August 16	"Ordinary"	Alex Warren	
212	August 23	"Ordinary"	Alex Warren	
212	August 30	"Ordinary"	Alex Warren	
212	September 6	"Ordinary"	Alex Warren	
213	September 13	"Golden"	Huntrix (Ejae, Audrey Nuna and Rei Ami)	
213	September 20	"Golden"	Huntrix (Ejae, Audrey Nuna and Rei Ami)	
213	September 27	"Golden"	Huntrix (Ejae, Audrey Nuna and Rei Ami)	
213	October 4	"Golden"	Huntrix (Ejae, Audrey Nuna and Rei Ami)	
213	October 11	"Golden"	Huntrix (Ejae, Audrey Nuna and Rei Ami)	
214	October 18	"The Fate of Ophelia"	Taylor Swift	
214	October 25	"The Fate of Ophelia"	Taylor Swift	
214	November 1	"The Fate of Ophelia"	Taylor Swift	
214	November 8	"The Fate of Ophelia"	Taylor Swift	
214	November 15	"The Fate of Ophelia"	Taylor Swift	
214	November 22	"The Fate of Ophelia"	Taylor Swift	
214	November 29	"The Fate of Ophelia"	Taylor Swift	
214	December 6	"The Fate of Ophelia"	Taylor Swift	
214	December 13	"The Fate of Ophelia"	Taylor Swift	
214	December 20	"The Fate of Ophelia"	Taylor Swift	
re	December 27	"All I Want for Christmas Is You"	Mariah Carey	

== See also ==
- List of number-one albums of 2025 (Canada)
