= Pimmie =

American singer and songwriter

- Origin: Houston, Texas, U.S.
- Genres: R&B
- Occupations: Singer; songwriter
- Years active: 2024–present
- Label: OVO Sound

Pimmie is an American R&B singer-songwriter and recording engineer from Houston, Texas. She is best known for her feature on "Pimmie's Dilemma," a track from the collaborative album Some Sexy Songs 4 U (2025) by Drake and PartyNextDoor, which became her first entry on the Billboard Hot 100. In 2026 she released her debut album, Don't Come Home, through OVO Sound.

== Career ==
Pimmie began her career as a self-taught mixing and mastering engineer, offering her services on online production marketplaces before focusing on her own recordings. In February 2024, she released her debut EP, Bittersweet. In October 2024, she released Bye Luv, a three-track EP produced by Imovekilo, who also features on Some Sexy Songs 4 U as a producer.

In February 2025, Pimmie appeared on "Pimmie's Dilemma," track eight of Some Sexy Songs 4 U, a collaborative album by Drake and PartyNextDoor released on 14 February 2025, through OVO Sound and Republic Records. She was the sole vocalist on the track. The album debuted at number one on the Billboard 200 with 246,000 equivalent album units in its first week, and all 21 of its tracks debuted on the Billboard Hot 100. "Pimmie's Dilemma" debuted at number 45 on the Billboard Hot 100 dated 1 March 2025, her first chart entry. The Fader compared Drake's introduction of Pimmie to his earlier featuring of Giveon and Yebba on earlier albums.

In January 2026, Pimmie signed to OVO Sound, releasing "Bet" as her first single under the label. Her debut album, Don't Come Home, was released on 6 March 2026, through OVO Sound under exclusive licence to Santa Anna Label Group.

== Discography ==
- Don't Come Home (2026)
