= Gimme a Hug =

Single by Drake

from the album Some Sexy Songs 4 U
- Released: February 26, 2025
- Recorded: 2024
- Studio: S.O.T.A (Florida); Sanctuary (Nassau)
- Genre: Hip-hop
- Length: 3:13
- Label: Santa Anna; OVO; Republic
- Songwriters: Aubrey Graham; Noel Cadastre; Kaushik Barua; Simon Hessman; Johannes Klahr; Richard Zestenker; Diamanté Blackmon
- Producers: Gordo; Kid Masterpiece; Klahr; Liohn; Simon on the Moon; Noel Cadastre

Drake singles chronology
| "Modo Capone" (2024) | "Gimme a Hug" (2025) | "Nokia" (2025) |

"Gimme a Hug" is a song recorded by Canadian rapper Drake for his collaborative studio album with PartyNextDoor entitled Some Sexy Songs 4 U. Produced by Gordo, Kid Masterpiece, Klahr, Liohn, Simon on the Moon and Noel Cadastre, it was released on February 14, 2025, by Santa Anna Label Group, OVO Sound and Republic Records. It impacted US rhythmic radio as the lead single on February 26, 2025. In the song, he addresses his on-going feud with Kendrick Lamar and other artists.

== Composition ==
"Gimme a Hug" is 3 minutes and 13 seconds long. Produced by Klahr, Gordo, Kid Masterpiece, Liohn, Simon on the Moon and Noel Cadastre, it was mixed by 40 and Cadastre with assistance from OUPSiNG, and mastered by Chris Athens assisted by Dave Huffman. "Gimme a Hug" samples from Aaron Hall's 1993 single, "I Miss You", and a composition by Terrell Grice, titled "Sing".

== Critical reception ==
The song received positive reviews. Billboard's Carl Lamarre ranked the song as the best track on Some Sexy Songs 4 U. Lamarre compared Drake's flow on the track to his on "Family Matters", stating that he "feasts on his rivals with his Teflon rhyme scheme" while describing the song as "punchline galore".

== Credits and personnel ==
Credits were adapted from the liner notes.

Recording

- S.O.T.A Studios – Florida, United States
- Sanctuary Studios – Nassau, The Bahamas

Musicians

- Drake – vocals, songwriter
- Gordo – producer, keyboards, programming
- Kid Masterpiece – producer, keyboards, programming
- Liohn – producer, keyboards, programming
- Klahr – producer, keyboards, programming
- Simon on the Moon – producer, keyboards, programming
- Noel Cadastre – producer, keyboards, programming

Technical

- 40 – mixing engineer
- Chris Athens – mastering engineer
- Noel Cadastre – recording engineer, mixing engineer
- Dave Huffman – assistant mastering engineer
- OUPSiNG – assistant mixing engineer

== Charts ==
=== Weekly charts ===
Weekly chart performance for "Gimme a Hug"
| Chart (2025) | Peak position |
|---|---|
| Australia (ARIA) | 44 |
| Australia Hip Hop/R&B (ARIA) | 13 |
| Canada (Canadian Hot 100) | 10 |
| Global 200 (Billboard) | 18 |
| Ireland (IRMA) | 54 |
| New Zealand Hot Singles (RMNZ) | 3 |
| Nigeria (TurnTable Top 100) | 32 |
| South Africa Streaming (TOSAC) | 1 |
| Sweden Heatseeker (Sverigetopplistan) | 19 |
| UK Singles (OCC) | 21 |
| UK Hip Hop/R&B (OCC) | 6 |
| US Billboard Hot 100 | 6 |
| US Hot R&B/Hip-Hop Songs (Billboard) | 5 |
| US Rhythmic Airplay (Billboard) | 4 |

=== Year-end charts ===
Year-end chart performance for "Gimme a Hug"
| Chart (2025) | Position |
|---|---|
| US Hot R&B/Hip-Hop Songs (Billboard) | 30 |
| US Rhythmic Airplay (Billboard) | 35 |

== Certifications ==
Certifications for "Gimme a Hug"
| Region | Certification | Certified units/sales |
|---|---|---|
| United States (RIAA) | Gold | 500,000^{‡} |
^{‡} Sales+streaming figures based on certification alone.

== Release history ==
Release dates and formats for "Gimme a Hug"
| Region | Date | Format(s) | Label(s) | Ref. |
|---|---|---|---|---|
| United States | 26 February 2025 | Rhythmic crossover | OVO; Santa Anna; Republic | |
