= Nokia (song) =

Single by Drake

from the album Some Sexy Songs 4 U
- Released: March 11, 2025
- Studio: S.O.T.A (Florida); Sanctuary (Nassau)
- Genre: Hip-hop; pop rap
- Length: 4:01
- Label: Santa Anna; OVO; Republic
- Songwriters: Aubrey Graham; Paul Agyei
- Producer: Elkan

Drake singles chronology
"Gimme a Hug" (2025)	"Nokia" (2025)	"Somebody Loves Me" (2025)

Music video
- "Nokia" on YouTube

"Nokia" (stylized in all caps) is a song by Canadian rapper Drake from his collaborative studio album with PartyNextDoor entitled Some Sexy Songs 4 U. Written by Drake and produced by Paul Omar "Elkan" Agyei (who provides additional vocals), it was released on February 14, 2025, by Santa Anna Label Group, OVO Sound and Republic Records. It impacted contemporary hit radio as the album's second single on March 11, 2025. "Nokia" peaked at number five on the Canadian Hot 100 and number two on the Billboard Hot 100 on April 19, 2025. Outside of North America, "Nokia" peaked within the top ten of the charts in Australia, New Zealand, and the United Kingdom.

== Composition ==
The beat is described as a "sweaty Atlanta bass beat peppered with flashy synths" with "androgynous vocals" (by Elkan). In the second half of the song, "the beat stutters and slows into a crunchy groove" and Drake raps in a "Whodini-type flow". The synth sounds sample the well-known Nokia ringtone from the 1990s and early 2000s.

== Critical reception ==
The song received positive reviews. Billboard's Michael Saponara ranked the song as the fifth best track on Some Sexy Songs 4 U. Saponara wrote that the track is an "electronic banger that has girls running around with glowstick necklaces" while stating that it would make "Daft Punk proud". He also stated that the track "showcases the supreme innovator" within Drake. Pitchfork's Mano Sundaresan wrote that the song "immediately feels ready for a drunken karaoke night" while describing it as an "indulgent, fan-service record".

HotNewHipHop ranked the song as the 4th best rap song of 2025.

== Music video ==
The song's official music video was released on March 31, 2025. It was deleted moments after its upload on YouTube, however, it was soon reuploaded. The video was shot in IMAX, was directed by Theo Skudra, and features a cameo from Shai Gilgeous-Alexander. Described as "nostalgic" by Rolling Stone's Tomás Mier, the video is black-and-white and features Nokia's famous snake game. Billboard's Michael Saponara wrote that Drake "invites a crew of girls for a Carnival-themed celebration before switching his focus to beautiful women flanking him for a night of rollerblading".

== Credits and personnel ==
Credits were adapted from the liner notes.

Recording

- S.O.T.A Studios – Florida, United States
- Sanctuary Studios – Nassau, The Bahamas

Musicians

- Drake – vocals, songwriter
- Elkan – producer, keyboards, additional vocals, background vocals, programming

Technical

- Chris Athens – mastering engineer
- Noel Cadastre – recording engineer, mixing engineer
- Dave Huffman – assistant mastering engineer

== Charts ==
=== Weekly charts ===
Chart performance for "Nokia"
Chart (2025)	Peak position
Australia (ARIA)	5
Australia Hip Hop/R&B (ARIA)	1
Canada Hot 100 (Billboard)	5
Canada CHR/Top 40 (Billboard)	11
Central America Anglo Airplay (Monitor Latino)	14
Colombia Anglo Airplay (Monitor Latino)	5
Colombia Anglo Airplay (National-Report)	7
Costa Rica Anglo Airplay (Monitor Latino)	8
Global 200 (Billboard)	8
Iceland (Tónlistinn)	17
Ireland (IRMA)	20
Lebanon (Lebanese Top 20)	5
Lithuania (AGATA)	39
Mexico Anglo Airplay (Monitor Latino)	18
New Zealand (Recorded Music NZ)	4
Nicaragua Anglo Airplay (Monitor Latino)	6
Nigeria (Turntable Top 100)	39
Norway (IFPI Norge)	63
Puerto Rico Anglo Airplay (Monitor Latino)	7
South Africa Streaming (TOSAC)	9
Suriname (Nationale Top 40)	11
Sweden Heatseeker (Sverigetopplistan)	1
Switzerland (Schweizer Hitparade)	56
UK Singles (Official Charts)	10
UK Hip Hop/R&B (Official Charts)	1
US Billboard Hot 100	2
US Adult Pop Airplay (Billboard)	40
US Hot R&B/Hip-Hop Songs (Billboard)	2
US Pop Airplay (Billboard)	10
US Rhythmic Airplay (Billboard)	1
Venezuela Anglo Airplay (Monitor Latino)	9

=== Year-end charts ===
Year-end chart performance for "Nokia"
Chart (2025)	Position
Australia (ARIA)	35
Canada (Canadian Hot 100)	21
Canada CHR/Top 40 (Billboard)	45
Global 200 (Billboard)	64
Iceland (Tónlistinn)	29
New Zealand (Recorded Music NZ)	31
UK Singles (OCC)	75
US Billboard Hot 100	24
US Hot R&B/Hip-Hop Songs (Billboard)	8
US Pop Airplay (Billboard)	41
US Rhythmic Airplay (Billboard)	4

== Certifications ==
Certifications for "Nokia"
Region	Certification	Certified units/sales
Denmark (IFPI Danmark)	Gold	45,000^{‡}
New Zealand (RMNZ)	Platinum	30,000^{‡}
United Kingdom (BPI)	Gold	400,000^{‡}
United States (RIAA)	3× Platinum	3,000,000^{‡}
^{‡} Sales+streaming figures based on certification alone.

== Release history ==
Release dates and formats for "Nokia"
Region	Date	Format(s)	Label(s)	Ref.
Various	February 14, 2025	Digital download; streaming	OVO; Santa Anna; Republic	
United States	March 11, 2025	Contemporary hit radio	OVO; Santa Anna; Republic	
United States	April 8, 2025	Rhythmic crossover	OVO; Santa Anna; Republic	
