= Chris Athens =

American mastering engineer from Texas (died 2026)

- Origin: Austin, Texas, U.S.
- Occupation: Mastering engineer
- Years active: mid-1990s–2026
- Website: chrisathensmasters.com

Chris Athens (died 20 March 2026) was an American mastering engineer from Stony Point, New York. He began his career at Sony Music Studios in New York in the mid-90s, where he worked until 1998, when he moved to Sterling Sound, where he worked for 13 years. In 2010, he founded his own studio, Chris Athens Masters, in his hometown of Austin, Texas.

As of 2026, Athens was a six-time Grammy Awards nominee. He received his first Grammy Award for Best Historical Album nomination at the 42nd Annual Grammy Awards in 2000 for Sony Music 100 Years: Soundtrack for a Century.

His work with Canadian musician Drake earned him two Grammy Award for Album of the Year nominations – at the 59th Annual Grammy Awards in 2017 for Views and at the 61st Annual Grammy Awards in 2019 for Scorpion, as well as a Grammy Award for Record of the Year nomination for "God's Plan". He also has two Grammy Award for Best Engineered Album, Non-Classical nominations for Ella Mai's eponymous debut studio album and Robert Glasper's Black Radio III.

In 2018, at the 19th Annual Latin Grammy Awards Athens received two Latin Grammy Award for Record of the Year nominations for Bomba Estéreo's "Internacionales" and Rosalía's "Malamente". The following year, at the 20th Annual Latin Grammy Awards, he achieved his third nomination in the respective category with Rosalía's "Aute Cuture", along the way winning a Latin Grammy Award for Album of the Year and a Latin Grammy Award for Best Engineered Album both for Rosalía's El mal querer. At the 22nd Annual Latin Grammy Awards held in 2021, C. Tangana's song "Te Olvidaste" brought the engineer his fourth Record of the Year nomination, while C. Tangana's album El Madrileño gave him an Album of the Year nomination and Best Engineered Album win.

Athens died on 20 March 2026.
