= 2017 iHeartRadio Music Awards =

Annual US music awards ceremony

- Date: March 5, 2017
- Location: The Forum, Inglewood
- Country: United States
- Hosted by: Ryan Seacrest
- Most awards: Drake (7)
- Most nominations: Drake (15)

Television/radio coverage
- Network: TBS, TNT, truTV and CTV (Canada)

The 2017 iHeartRadio Music Awards were held on March 5, 2017 at The Forum in Inglewood, California, and hosted by Ryan Seacrest. The list of nominations was announced on January 3, 2017. Drake received the most nominations with fifteen categories, followed by The Chainsmokers with twelve.

== Performances ==
The following artists performed at the show:

Artist(s)	Song(s)
Katy Perry; Skip Marley	"Chained to the Rhythm"
Big Sean	"Bounce Back" "Moves"
Noah Cyrus; Labrinth	"Make Me (Cry)"
Ed Sheeran	"Shape of You" "Castle on the Hill"
The Chainsmokers; Coldplay	"Paris" "Something Just Like This"
Thomas Rhett	"Star of the Show"
Shawn Mendes	"Mercy"
Bruno Mars	"Treasure" "That's What I Like"

== Winners & nominees ==
The nominees were announced on January 3, 2017. Winners are highlighted in boldface.

Song of the Year (presented by Jeremy Renner)	Female Artist of the Year
**"Can't Stop the Feeling!" – Justin Timberlake**; "Cheap Thrills" – Sia featuring Sean Paul; "Closer" – The Chainsmokers featuring Halsey; "One Dance" – Drake featuring Wizkid and Kyla; "Stressed Out" – Twenty One Pilots	**Adele**; Selena Gomez; Ariana Grande; Rihanna; Sia
Male Artist of the Year	Best New Artist
**Justin Bieber**; Luke Bryan; Drake; Shawn Mendes; The Weeknd	**The Chainsmokers**; Kelsea Ballerini; Chance the Rapper; Joss Favela; Bryson Tiller; The Strumbellas; CNCO
Best Duo/Group of the Year	Album of the Year (per genre)
**Twenty One Pilots**; The Chainsmokers; Coldplay; DNCE; Florida Georgia Line	Pop: **25 – Adele**; Rock: **Hardwired... to Self-Destruct – Metallica**; Alternative Rock: **Blurryface – Twenty One Pilots**; Country: **Traveller – Chris Stapleton**; Dance: **Collage – The Chainsmokers**; Hip-Hop: **Views – Drake**; R&B: **Anti – Rihanna**; Latin: **Energía – J Balvin**; Regional Mexican: **Recuerden Mi Estilo – Los Plebes del Rancho de Ariel Camacho**
Alternative Rock Song of the Year	Alternative Rock Artist of the Year
**"Heathens" – Twenty One Pilots**; "Bored to Death" – Blink-182; "Dark Necessities" – Red Hot Chili Peppers; "Ride" – Twenty One Pilots; "Trouble" – Cage the Elephant	**Twenty One Pilots**; Blink-182; Cage the Elephant; Coldplay; The Strumbellas
Rock Song of the Year	Rock Artist of the Year
"**Bang Bang" - Green Day**; "Dark Necessities" - Red Hot Chili Peppers; "The Devil's Bleeding Crown" – Volbeat; "Take Me Down" – The Pretty Reckless; "The Sound of Silence" - Disturbed	**Disturbed**; Five Finger Death Punch; Red Hot Chili Peppers; Shinedown; Volbeat
Country Song of the Year	Country Artist of the Year (presented by Kelsea Ballerini)
**"Somewhere on a Beach" - Dierks Bentley**; "Church Bells" - Carrie Underwood; "Snapback" - Old Dominion; "T-Shirt" - Thomas Rhett; "You Should Be Here" - Cole Swindell	**Thomas Rhett**; Jason Aldean; Luke Bryan; Carrie Underwood; Keith Urban
Dance Song of the Year (presented by Ansel Elgort and Karrueche Tran)	Dance Artist of the Year
**"Closer" - The Chainsmokers featuring Halsey**; "Cold Water" - Major Lazer featuring Justin Bieber and MØ; "Don't Let Me Down" - The Chainsmokers featuring Daya; "I Took a Pill in Ibiza (SeeB Remix)" - Mike Posner; "Let Me Love You" - DJ Snake featuring Justin Bieber	**The Chainsmokers**; DJ Snake; Flume; Calvin Harris; Major Lazer
Hip-Hop Song of the Year	Hip-Hop Artist of the Year
**"One Dance" – Drake featuring Wizkid and Kyla**; "All the Way Up" - Fat Joe and Remy Ma featuring French Montana and Infared; "Controlla" – Drake; "For Free" - DJ Khaled featuring Drake; "Panda" - Desiigner	**Drake**; Desiigner; DJ Khaled; Future; J. Cole
R&B Song of the Year	R&B Artist of the Year
**"Work" - Rihanna featuring Drake**; "Exchange" - Bryson Tiller; "Needed Me" – Rihanna; "No Limit" - Usher featuring Young Thug; "Sorry" – Beyoncé	**The Weeknd**; Rihanna; Beyoncé; Bryson Tiller; Usher
Latin Song of the Year	Latin Artist of the Year
**"Duele el Corazón" - Enrique Iglesias featuring Wisin**; "Ay Mi Dios" - IAmChino featuring Pitbull, Yandel and El Chacal; "De Pies A Cabeza" - Maná featuring Nicky Jam; "La Carretera" - Prince Royce; "Ya Me Enteré" - Reik featuring Nicky Jam	**Nicky Jam**; Enrique Iglesias; J Balvin; Prince Royce; Yandel
Regional Mexican Song of the Year	Regional Mexican Artist of the Year
**"Solo Con Verte" - Banda Sinaloense MS de Sergio Lizárraga**; "Amor Del Bueno" - Calibre 50; "Cicatrices" - Regulo Caro; "Me Está Gustando" - Banda Los Recoditos; "¿Por Qué Terminamos?" - Gerardo Ortíz	**Calibre 50**; Banda El Recodo de Cruz Lizárraga; Banda Los Recoditos; Gerardo Ortíz; Remmy Valenzuela
Best New Rock/Alternative Rock Artist	Best New Country Artist
**The Strumbellas**; Foals; Kaleo; Nathaniel Rateliff & the Night Sweats; Red Sun Rising	**Kelsea Ballerini**; Chris Lane; Maren Morris; Granger Smith; Chris Stapleton
Best New Hip-Hop Artist	Best New Latin Artist
**Chance the Rapper**; Desiigner; DRAM; Kevin Gates; Kent Jones	**CNCO**; Christian Daniel; Sofía Reyes; Carlos Rivera; IAmChino
Best New R&B Artist	Best New Regional Mexican Artist
**Bryson Tiller**; Belly; Kayla Brianna; Dreezy; Ro James	**Joss Favela**; Cheyo Carrillo; Adriel Favela; Banda Los Sebastianes; La Séptima Banda
Best New Pop Artist	Producer of the Year
**The Chainsmokers**; Alessia Cara; Daya; Lukas Graham; Zayn	**Benny Blanco**; Mike Elizondo; Greg Kurstin; Max Martin; The Chainsmokers
Best Lyrics (presented by Macklemore)	Best Collaboration
**"Love Yourself" - Justin Bieber**; "7 Years" - Lukas Graham; "Came Here to Forget" - Blake Shelton; "Cheap Thrills" - Sia featuring Sean Paul; "Closer" - The Chainsmokers featuring Halsey; "Heathens" - Twenty One Pilots; "Scars to Your Beautiful" - Alessia Cara; "Send My Love (To Your New Lover)" – Adele; "Too Good" – Drake featuring Rihanna; "You Should Be Here" - Cole Swindell	**"Work" - Rihanna featuring Drake**; "Cheap Thrills" - Sia featuring Sean Paul; "Closer" - The Chainsmokers featuring Halsey; "Don't Let Me Down" - The Chainsmokers featuring Daya; "This Is What You Came For" - Calvin Harris featuring Rihanna
Best Song from a Movie	Best Cover Song
**"Girls Talk Boys" – 5 Seconds of Summer (Ghostbusters)**; "Can't Stop the Feeling!" – Justin Timberlake (Trolls); "Heathens" – Twenty One Pilots (Suicide Squad); "Just Like Fire" – P!nk (Alice Through the Looking Glass); "Still Falling for You" – Ellie Goulding (Bridget Jones's Baby)	**"Ex's & Oh's" - Fifth Harmony**; "All I Ask" - Bruno Mars; "Fast Car" - Justin Bieber; "Hands to Myself" – DNCE; "Here" - Shawn Mendes; "How Will I Know" - Ariana Grande; "Love on the Brain" - Kelly Clarkson; "Purple Rain" - Jennifer Hudson and the cast of The Color Purple; "The Sound of Silence" – Disturbed; "Too Good" - Zara Larsson
Best Music Video	Best Underground Alternative Band
"Work from Home" – Fifth Harmony featuring Ty Dolla $ign; "Can't Stop the Feeling!" – Justin Timberlake; "Don't Let Me Down" – The Chainsmokers featuring Daya; "Formation" – Beyoncé; "Hasta el Amanecer" – Nicky Jam; "Heathens" – Twenty One Pilots; "Hymn for the Weekend" – Coldplay; "I Took a Pill in Ibiza (SeeB Remix)" - Mike Posner; "Side to Side" – Ariana Grande featuring Nicki Minaj; "This Is What You Came For" – Calvin Harris featuring Rihanna; "Work" – Rihanna featuring Drake; "Pillowtalk" – Zayn	**Pierce the Veil**; Hey Violet; PVRIS; Sleeping with Sirens; Tonight Alive
Social Star Award	Best Fan Army (presented by Ryan Seacrest)
**Jack & Jack from Snapchat**; Alex Aiono from YouTube; Baby Ariel from Musical.ly; Steph Clavin from Instagram; Todrick Hall from YouTube; Hailey Knox from YouNow; Emma McGann from YouNow; Marcus Perez from Facebook; Jacob Sartorius from Musical.ly; xYego from Smule	**Fifth Harmony – Harmonizers**; 5 Seconds of Summer – 5SOSFam; Beyoncé – Beyhive; Justin Bieber – Beliebers; Selena Gomez – Selenators; Ariana Grande – Arianators; Lady Gaga - Little Monsters; Demi Lovato – Lovatics; Shawn Mendes - Mendes Army; Katy Perry – KatyCats; Rihanna – Rihanna Navy; Britney Spears – Britney Army; Twenty One Pilots – Skeleton Clique
Best Tour (presented by John Legend)	Best Solo Breakout
**A Head Full of Dreams Tour – Coldplay**	**Zayn**; Camila Cabello; Niall Horan; Louis Tomlinson; Olivia O'Brien
Most Thumbed-Up Artist of the Year	Most Thumbed-Up Song of the Year
**Drake**	**"One Dance" – Drake featuring Wizkid and Kyla**
Label of the Year	Innovator Award (presented by Big Sean)
**Republic Records**	**Bruno Mars**

== Category mistake ==
The day of the ceremony, Zayn was incorrectly announced as the winner for the Best Music Video category, and he accepted the award. The error was not caught until the next day, when the actual winner, Fifth Harmony, was announced on the iHeartRadio's official Twitter account. Zayn was then announced as the winner of the category "Best Solo Breakout".
