= Figure It Out (French Montana song) =

Single by French Montana featuring Kanye West and Nas

from the album Wave Gods and MC4
- Released: May 6, 2016
- Genre: Hip hop
- Length: 4:01
- Label: Epic
- Songwriters: Karim Kharbouch; Erik Alcock; Khalil Abdul-Rahman; Kanye West; Nasir Jones
- Producers: DJ Khalil; Rick Steel

French Montana singles chronology
"All the Way Up" (2016)	"Figure It Out" (2016)	"Lockjaw" (2016)

Kanye West singles chronology
"Pop Style" (2016)	"Figure It Out" (2016)	"That Part" (2016)

Nas singles chronology
"The Sickness" (2016)	"'Figure It Out" (2016)	"Deep" (2016)

"Figure It Out" is a song by American rapper French Montana, featuring Kanye West and Nas. The track was released on May 6, 2016 as the first single from Montana's mixtape MC4 (2016). It was also released as the first single from his mixtape Wave Gods (2016), which was released at an earlier date than the single itself.

== Background ==
Montana initially revealed that he had been working on music with West in July 2014 when he shared a snippet of a collaboration between them via Instagram. However, this snippet was revealed at a later date to be part of an unreleased track titled "Ass Shots" when it surfaced online in full.

"Figure It Out" didn't mark the only time that Montana was involved musically with Kanye West in its year of release, since he had vocals on "Siiiiiiiiilver Surffffeeeeer Intermission" from West's album The Life of Pablo (2016).

== Music video ==
On March 6, 2016, Montana shared a photo online of him and the two featured artists filming a music video for the song. It was officially released on May 5, 2016 and was filmed in a desert. Two days after the release of the music video, West tweeted out a link to it and also expressed his enjoyment from filming with Montana and Nas.

== Charts ==
Chart (2016)	Peak position
US Bubbling Under R&B/Hip-Hop Singles (Billboard)	4

== Release history ==
Region	Date	Format	Label	Ref.
Various	May 6, 2016	Digital download	Epic	
