= Grammy (disambiguation) =

Grammy Awards are presented by The Recording Academy of the United States to recognize outstanding achievements in music.

Grammy may also refer to:

- Latin Grammy Awards, an award recognizing achievement in the Latin music industry
- GMM Grammy, a Thai entertainment company

== See also ==
- "Grammys", a song by Drake from Views
