= Montana (album) =

Studio album by French Montana
- Released: December 6, 2019
- Length: 67:00
- Label: Montana; Coke Boys; Bad Boy; Epic
- Producer: Ashton Vines; Ben Billions; Cardo; Cashio; Cool & Dre; Couture; Cubeatz; Di Genius; French Montana; Harry Fraud; Hector Chaparro; Juicy J; London on da Track; Louis Bell; Mally Mall; Maaly Raw; Mixx; Murda Beatz; Prince 85; Rvssian; SAP; Scorp Dezel; Tony Seltzer; Yo Asel

French Montana chronology
Coke Wave 4 (2019)	Montana (2019)	CB5 (2020)

Singles from Montana
- 1. "Lockjaw" Released: May 27, 2016; 2. "No Shopping" Released: July 16, 2016; 3. "No Stylist" Released: September 20, 2018; 4. "Slide" Released: April 18, 2019; 5. "Wiggle It" Released: July 12, 2019; 6. "Suicide Doors" Released: September 13, 2019; 7. "Writing on the Wall" Released: September 27, 2019; 8. "Twisted" Released: October 11, 2019; 9. "Out of Your Mind" Released: January 21, 2020

Professional ratings
Review scores
Source	Rating
Allmusic	3/5 stars
Pitchfork	5.8/10

Montana (stylized in all caps) is the third studio album by American rapper French Montana. It was released on December 6, 2019, through Epic Records, Bad Boy, Coke Boys and Montana Entertainment. The production on the album was handled by multiple producers including Harry Fraud, Louis Bell, London on da Track, Cardo, Rvssian and Murda Beatz among others. The album also features guest appearances by Post Malone, Swae Lee, Kodak Black, Cardi B, Chris Brown, PartyNextDoor, ASAP Rocky and many others.

Montana was supported by seven singles: "No Stylist", "Slide", "Wiggle It", "Suicide Doors", "Writing on the Wall", "Twisted" and "Out of Your Mind". It also includes the singles "Lockjaw" featuring Kodak Black and "No Shopping" featuring Drake, which were previously released on Montana's 2016 mixtape MC4. The album received mixed-to-positive reviews from music critics and middling commercial performance. It debuted at number 25 on the US Billboard 200 chart, earning 25,000 album-equivalent units in its first week.

== Promotion ==
French Montana shared a trailer for the album directed by Kid Art, which features him "surrounded by a line of women in thigh-high red boots and dark burqas" and was called "connecting with his Muslim roots".

== Commercial performance ==
Montana debuted at number 25 on the US Billboard 200 chart, earning 25,000 album-equivalent units (including 6,000 copies in pure album sales) in its first week. This became Montana's lowest first week sales and lowest charting album to date. On December 5, 2019, the album was certified gold by the Recording Industry Association of America (RIAA) for combined sales and album-equivalent units of over 500,000 units in the United States.

== Track listing ==
Credits adapted from Tidal.

Side one
No.	Title	Writer(s)	Producer(s)	Length
1.	"Montana"	Karim Kharbouch; Mejdi Rhars; Rory Quigley; Ellas McDaniel; Koko Taylor; Les Baxter; Robert Caldwell	Prince 85; Harry Fraud; French Montana	3:26
2.	"Suicide Doors" (featuring Gunna)	Kharbouch; Sergio Kitchens; Quigley	Harry Fraud	3:33
3.	"50's & 100's" (featuring Juicy J)	Kharbouch; Jordan Houston	Juicy J	2:41
4.	"What It Look Like"	Kharbouch; Marcello Valenzano; Andre Lyon; Jonathan King; James Smith	Cool & Dre; SAP; French Montana	2:49
5.	"Lifestyle" (featuring Kodak Black and Kevin Gates)	Kharbouch; Bill Kapri; Kevin Gilyard; Ronald LaTour; Jocelyn Donald; Darwin Turner	Cardo	2:41
6.	"Salam Alaykum"	Kharbouch; Quigley; Baruch Nembhard; Liew Kellett	Harry Fraud; Mixx; French Montana	4:07
7.	"That Way"	Kharbouch; Paul Couture; Stephen Cropper; Donald Dunn; Al Jackson, Jr.; Booker Jones, Jr.; Edward Archer; Hoard Thompson; James Brown	Couture; French Montana	2:14
8.	"Say Goodbye" (featuring Belly)	Kharbouch; Ahmad Balshe; Scorp Dezel; Quigley; Jamal Rashid; Oluwaseyi Agbeti	Scorp Dezel; Harry Fraud; Mally Mall; French Montana	3:47
9.	"Coke Wave Boys" (featuring Chinx and Max B)	Kharbouch; Lionel Pickens; Charley Wingate; Quigley; Tony Seltzer; Ahmir Thompson; Jimmy Gray; Leonard Hubbard; Raphael Saadiq; Tarik Collins	Harry Fraud; Tony Seltzer	4:13

Side two
No.	Title	Writer(s)	Producer(s)	Length
1.	"Writing on the Wall" (featuring Post Malone, Cardi B, and Rvssian)	Kharbouch; Austin Post; Belcalis Almanzar; Tarik Johnston; Louis Bell; Stephen McGregor; Cashio; Azul; Richard McClashie	Bell; Rvssian; Di Genius; Cashio	3:21
2.	"Out of Your Mind" (with Swae Lee featuring Chris Brown)	Kharbouch; Khalif Brown; Christopher Brown; Rashid	Mally Mall	3:14
3.	"Wanna Be" (featuring PartyNextDoor)	Kharbouch; Jahron Brathwaite; London Holmes	London on da Track	3:22
4.	"Twisted" (featuring Juicy J, Logic, and ASAP Rocky)	Kharbouch; Houston; Sir Bryson Hall, Jr.; Rakim Mayers	Juicy J	4:22
5.	"Hoop" (featuring Quavo)	Kharbouch; Quavious Marshall; Nembhard; Jamaal Henry	Mixx; Maaly Raw	3:11
6.	"No Stylist" (featuring Drake)	Kharbouch; Aubrey Graham; Hector Chaparro; L. Holmes; Christian Ward; Floyd Bentley; Felix Pappalardi; Leslie Weistein; John Ventura; Christopher Dotson	Hector Chaparro; London on da Track	3:09
7.	"Wiggle It" (with Quality Control featuring City Girls)	Kharbouch; Caresha Brownlee; Jatavia Johnson; Benjamin Diehl; Raynford Humphrey; Gamal Lewis; Hugh Brankin; John Reid; Ross Campbell; Graham Wilson	Ben Billions; French Montana	2:42
8.	"Slide" (featuring Blueface and Lil Tjay)	Kharbouch; Johnathan Porter; Tione Merritt; Ashton Vines; Nembhard; Andre Young; Calvin Broadus, Jr.; Clarence Satchell; Delmar Arnaud; Eric Collins; Gregory Webster; Joseph Williams; Lawrence Parker; Leroy Bonner; Marshall Jones; Marvin Pierce; Norman Napier; Philip Thomas; Ralph Middlebrooks; Ricardo Brown; Walter Morrison	Ashton Vines; Mixx; French Montana	3:06
9.	"Saucy"	Kharbouch; Quigley	Harry Fraud	3:56

Side two Bonus tracks
No.	Title	Writer(s)	Producer(s)	Length
10.	"No Shopping" (featuring Drake)	Kharbouch; Graham; Shane Lindstrom; Kevin Gomringer; Tim Gomringer	Murda Beatz; Cubeatz	3:47
11.	"Lockjaw" (featuring Kodak Black)	Kharbouch; Kapri; Khaled Khaled; Diehl; Assil Youssef	Ben Billions; Yo Asel	3:43

== Personnel ==
Credits adapted from Tidal.

- Mixx – recording (tracks 1, 2, 4–6, 8, 9)
- ADHD – recording (tracks 1, 2, 7)
- Jaycen Joshua – mixing (tracks 1, 4, 5, 8, 9)
- Jacob Richards – mixing (track 1), mixing assistant (tracks 4, 5), engineering assistant (tracks 8, 9)
- Rashawn McLean – mixing (track 1), mixing assistant (tracks 4, 5), engineering assistant (tracks 8, 9)
- Mike Seaberg – mixing (track 1), mixing assistant (tracks 4, 5), engineering assistant (tracks 8, 9)
- John Sparkz – mixing (tracks 2, 6, 7)
- Colin Leonard – mastering (tracks 1, 3–9)
- Tommy Tee – writer (track 2)

== Charts ==
Chart (2019)	Peak position
Canadian Albums (Billboard)	23
Dutch Albums (Album Top 100)	74
French Albums (SNEP)	184
US Billboard 200	25
US Top R&B/Hip-Hop Albums (Billboard)	14

== Certifications ==
Region	Certification	Certified units/sales
Canada (Music Canada)	Gold	40,000^{‡}
United States (RIAA)	Gold	500,000^{‡}
^{‡} Sales+streaming figures based on certification alone.
