= Eman Kellam =

Nigerian-British Media Personality (born 1997)

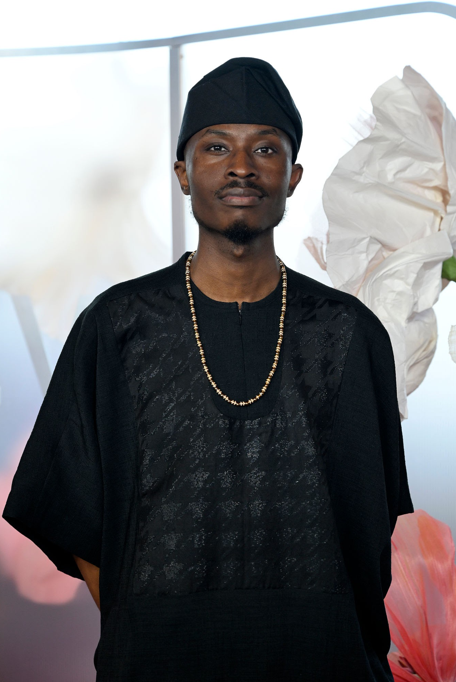
- Olaniyan in 2026
- Born: Emmanuel Kellam Olaniyan; 27 November 1997 (age 28); South London, London, England
- Education: BRIT School
- Occupations: Presenter; Journalist
- Years active: 2012–present

YouTube information
- Channel: EmanKellam
- Subscribers: 128 thousand
- Views: 16 million
- Last updated: 21 September 2026

Eman Kellam (born 27 November 1997) is a Nigerian-British media personality. He presents the webshows "British Slang With Eman Kellam" & "Eman Kellam & Friends".

== Personal life ==
Olaniyan was born and raised in South London, to parents of Nigerian origin. He attended Forest Hill School, and then The BRIT School for Performing Arts and Technology where he studied Broadcasting and Digital Communications.

== Youth politics & engagement ==
In October 2013, Olaniyan was elected as the Young Mayor for the London Borough of Lewisham, representing young people across the borough.

Olaniyan’s manifesto focused on improving youth opportunities, expanding access to apprenticeships, enhancing sports facilities, promoting inclusion and using social media to connect the council with young residents. During his first term, he managed a £30,000 youth budget which funded performing-arts showcases and youth-led community projects.

In 2015, Olaniyan was re-elected securing 1,883 first-preference votes and 863 second-preference votes giving a total of 2,746 votes.

His second term prioritised youth safety, mental health and employment opportunities. Olaniyan and his youth advisors introduced a system of small community grants that allowed youth groups to bid for funding and he worked with local police, faith organisations and charities to deliver violence-prevention and wellbeing programmes.

== Career ==
=== YouTube ===
Olaniyan started creating content on his YouTube channel "EmansBlogs" in 2012. He created video blogs in his kitchen. In 2014 he uploaded his most viewed video, "Pranking My African Dad", in which at 16 years old he pranked his father by telling him he had impregnated a 14-year-old girl.

This video has amassed over 9.6 million views on YouTube, 13.3 million views on Instagram and 15 million views on Facebook (as of November 2026) and has been widely reposted and discussed across various platforms including WorldStarHipHop and Bossip.

"Pranking My African Dad" has been widely quoted and referenced across African comedy, music and film in the years since its release with lines from the video being used as running jokes online. In a 2025 interview, Olaniyan described the video's ongoing cultural presence including it's use in memes, songs and film quotes as "an honour", while he pushed back on the suggestion that is has served as a "blueprint" for African comedy content.

=== French Montana collaboration ===
On 5 November 2016, French Montana released his album MC4 on the Apple Music show OVO Sound Radio. The show was curated by Noah "40" Shebib and Oliver El-Khatib who founded OVO Sound radio with Drake.

Olaniyan and his father featured on the show via an intro skit on French Montana’s MC4 album entitled "Check Come". The skit was taken from Olaniyan's "Pranking My African Dad" video.

=== Lifebabble, CBBC and BBC "Own It" ===
In January 2016, he appeared on the CBBC Channel on Lifebabble.

In February 2018 Olaniyan appeared on the same channel as a guest presenter to promote "BBC Own It", a new online learning resource commissioned by the BBC aimed at 9-12 year olds. Covering a range of topics that would relate to children growing up in the digital age. Own It launched nationally on Tuesday 7 February 2018. He then made several guest presenting appearances on the channel along with featuring in other CBBC shows.

=== YouTube Black Voices ===
In January 2021 YouTube announced the international list of creators of the inaugural YouTube Black Voices Class of 2021, of which Olaniyan was a UK class member.

Some members of the class of 2021 were also featured in the September 2021 issue of British Vogue in which Olaniyan was also included.

=== British Slang With Eman Kellam Series ===
Olaniyan produced the YouTube series British Slang With Eman Kellam, in which he would ask predominantly American actors to interpret slang commonly used by young people in the United Kingdom, often referred to as Multicultural London English (MLE) influenced by Caribbean and African linguistics. The series concluded on 24 November 2022.

Celebrity guests included Gabrielle Union, Denzel Washington, Childish Gambino, Regina Hall, Keke Palmer, Daniel Kaluuya and Issa Rae.

British Slang With Eman Kellam - Episode List'
Episode Number	Guest/s featured in Episode	Release Date
1	Unge	1 July 2015
2	Ben Hardy, Tye Sheridan, and Alexandra Shipp	24 May 2016
3	Dave Franco	8 August 2016
4	Nathan Zed	24 August 2016
5	RJ Cyler, Dacre Montgomery, and Ludi Lin	16 March 2017
6	Becky G and Naomi Scott	23 March 2017
7	Kaya Scodelario and Brenton Thwaites	24 May 2017
8	Demetrius Shipp Jr.	30 June 2017
9	Cara Delevingne and Dane DeHaan	25 July 2017
10	Gabrielle Union and Ajiona Alexus	6 May 2018
11	Childish Gambino and Phoebe Waller-Bridge	19 May 2018
12	Denzel Washington	11 August 2018
13	Shameik Moore	9 December 2018
14	John Cena	13 December 2018
15	Zachary Levi	22 March 2019
16	Regina Hall, Issa Rae, and Marsai Martin	7 April 2019
17	Daniel Kaluuya and Jodie Turner-Smith	2 February 2020
18	Keke Palmer	19 June 2022
19	Daniel Kaluuya and Keke Palmer	8 August 2022
20	Gabrielle Union and Jaboukie Young-White	24 November 2022

=== Eman Kellam & Friends ===
On 14 December 2024, after a 2 year hiatus, Olaniyan premiered a spinoff of his show "British Slang With Eman Kellam" on Tiktok & Instagram in which he hosts a chat with Hollywood actors & directors discussing film and culture released in short form snippets.

Episode 1 featured Aaron Pierre & Kelvin Harrison Jr. and was well received across social media.

Eman Kellam & Friends - Episode List'
Episode Number	Guest/s featured in Episode	Release Date
1	Aaron Pierre & Kelvin Harrison Jr.	14 December 2024
2	Wunmi Mosaku	15 April 2025
3	Michael B Jordan & Miles Caton	16 April 2025
4	Brendan Fraser & Hikari	25 December 2025
5	Michael Patrick King	27 March 2026
6	Spike Fearn & Angourie Rice	19 May 2026
7	Kane Parsons	25 May 2026
8	Letitia Wright & Bashy	19 August 2026
9	Andrew Garfield	4 October 2026

== Music career ==
=== 2021 ===
Olaniyan released his secret debut EP "For The Summer" on 10 June 2021.

== Filmography ==
=== Film ===
Year	Title	Role	Notes
2014	Will You Kill Me Now?	Toby	Short Film
2017	Action Point	Shorts (uncredited)	Feature Film
2021	Music, Trial & Trauma: The Movie	Producer	Short Film
2024	The Sidemen Story	(Himself) Cameo Appearance	Documentary
2025	Gone Clear	Verbaliser	Short Film

=== Television ===
Year	Title	Role	Notes
2014	Right This Minute	Himself	1 episode
2015	The Xperiment	Himself	1 episode
2016 - 2018	Lifebabble	Himself	26 episodes
2017	Inglorious Pranksters	Himself	1 episode
2018	BBC "Own It"	Himself	Team Own It Member
2018	CBBC Channel	Himself	Guest appearances
2019	All Over the Place	Himself	Series 9
2020	Monday Night Football	Himself	Guest Appearance
2022	Unapologetic with Zeze Millz & Yinka Bokinni	Himself	Series 2, Episode 1
2023	ITVx's Tell Me Everything You Know About	Himself	3 Episodes

== Discography ==
=== Extended plays ===
Title	Details	Peak chart positions	Certifications
Title	Details	UK	Certifications
For The Summer	Released: 10 June 2021; Label: Independent; Format: Streaming, digital download	-	

== Songwriting credits ==
Year	Title	Artist	Role	Album
2016	"Check Come"	French Montana	Writer	MC4 (album)
