= Writing on the Wall (French Montana song) =

2019 single by French Montana featuring Post Malone, Cardi B and Rvssian

Single by French Montana featuring Post Malone, Cardi B and Rvssian

from the album Montana
- Released: September 27, 2019
- Genre: Hip-hop; reggae
- Length: 3:21
- Label: Epic
- Songwriters: Karim Kharbouch; Austin Post; Belcalis Almanzar; Tarik Johnston; Louis Bell; Cashio; Azul; Richard McClashie; Stephen McGregor
- Producers: Louis Bell; Rvssian; Cashio; Azul

French Montana singles chronology
"Suicide Doors" (2019)	"Writing on the Wall" (2019)	"Twisted" (2019)

Post Malone singles chronology
"Allergic" (2019)	"Writing on the Wall" (2019)	"Take What You Want" (2019)

Cardi B singles chronology
"Yes" (2019)	"Writing on the Wall" (2019)	"WAP" (2020)

Rvssian singles chronology
"B11" (2019)	"Writing on the Wall" (2019)	"Late Night Call" (2019)

Music video
- "Writing on the Wall" on YouTube

"Writing on the Wall" is a song by Moroccan-American rapper French Montana featuring American musician Post Malone, American rapper Cardi B, and Jamaican producer Rvssian. It was released on September 27, 2019 as the fifth single from French Montana's third studio album Montana. It is also part of the official soundtrack for Need for Speed Heat.

== Background ==
French Montana first announced in an April 2019 Beats 1 interview with Zane Lowe that his album was "96% done" and he had a song with Post Malone and Cardi B. Montana further discussed the track in a May 2019 interview with Entertainment Weekly.

== Promotion ==
French Montana posted a montage of clips from the video on his social media accounts on September 26, announcing that the song would be released the following day.

== Awards and nominations ==
Year	Awards	Category	Result	Ref.
2020	BET Hip Hop Awards	Sweet 16: Best Featured Verse	Nominated	

== Charts ==
Chart (2019)	Peak position
Australia (ARIA)	43
Belgium (Ultratip Bubbling Under Flanders)	46
Canada Hot 100 (Billboard)	18
Canada CHR/Top 40 (Billboard)	49
Czech Republic Singles Digital (ČNS IFPI)	80
Greece (IFPI)	21
Hungary (Single Top 40)	5
Hungary (Stream Top 40)	33
Ireland (IRMA)	42
Lithuania (AGATA)	30
New Zealand Hot Singles (RMNZ)	4
Norway (VG-lista)	19
Portugal (AFP)	85
Scotland Singles (OCC)	71
Slovakia Singles Digital (ČNS IFPI)	40
Sweden (Sverigetopplistan)	40
Switzerland (Schweizer Hitparade)	54
UK Singles (OCC)	44
UK Hip Hop/R&B (OCC)	30
US Billboard Hot 100	56
US Hot R&B/Hip-Hop Songs (Billboard)	33
US Pop Airplay (Billboard)	29
US Rhythmic Airplay (Billboard)	14
US Rolling Stone Top 100	45

== Certifications ==
Region	Certification	Certified units/sales
Canada (Music Canada)	Gold	40,000^{‡}
United States (RIAA)	Gold	500,000^{‡}
^{‡} Sales+streaming figures based on certification alone.

== Release history ==
Region	Date	Format	Label	Ref.
Various	September 27, 2019	Digital download; streaming	Epic	
Italy	October 11, 2019	Top 40 radio	Sony	
United States	October 15, 2019	Top 40 radio	Epic	
