= Fire & Desire =

2016 song by Drake

Promotional single by Drake

from the album Views
- Released: April 7, 2016
- Recorded: 2016
- Genre: R&B
- Length: 3:58
- Label: OVO; Republic
- Songwriters: Aubrey Graham; Noah Shebib; Brandy Norwood; Rochad Holiday; Curtis Wilson; William Young
- Producers: 40; Hagler; Jordan Lewis

"Fire & Desire" is a song by Canadian rapper Drake, recorded for his fourth studio album Views (2016). The song was certified platinum on June 29, 2018.

== Composition and lyrics ==
“Fire & Desire” is a smooth low-energy R&B song with a length of three minutes and fifty-eight seconds. The song plays with chilly chords and clipped electronic drums. The song samples the 1994 song “I Dedicate (Part II)” by Brandy, used throughout the whole song from the beginning to the end. Drake's ability to dive into personal experiences and emotions is demonstrated in "Fire & Desire”. The song is about recognizing the significance of his lady ("you're a real-ass woman and I like it," he sings).

== Reception ==
Bandwagon's Angela Buensuceso was positive towards "Fire & Desire."

== Charts ==
Chart performance for "Fire & Desire"
Chart (2016)	Peak position
Canada Hot 100 (Billboard)	64
UK Singles (Official Charts)	88
US Billboard Hot 100	75
US Hot R&B/Hip-Hop Songs (Billboard)	30

== Certifications ==
Certifications for "Fire & Desire"
Region	Certification	Certified units/sales
Australia (ARIA)	Platinum	70,000^{‡}
United Kingdom (BPI)	Gold	400,000^{‡}
United States (RIAA)	Platinum	1,000,000^{‡}
^{‡} Sales+streaming figures based on certification alone.
