= No Shopping =

Single by French Montana featuring Drake

Single by French Montana featuring Drake

from the album MC4 and Montana
- Released: July 16, 2016
- Recorded: 2016
- Genre: Hip hop
- Length: 3:47
- Label: Bad Boy; Coke Boys; Epic
- Songwriters: Karim Kharbouch; Aubrey Graham; Shane Lindstrom; Kevin Gomringer; Tim Gomringer
- Producers: Murda Beatz; Cubeatz

French Montana singles chronology
"Lockjaw" (2016)	"No Shopping" (2016)	"Cookin" (2016)

Drake singles chronology
"Controlla" (2016)	"No Shopping" (2016)	"Too Good" (2016)

"No Shopping" is a single by American rapper French Montana, from his mixtape MC4. The track features a guest appearance from Canadian rapper Drake. It was released on July 16, 2016. The hip hop track was produced by Murda Beatz and Cubeatz. The song was certified Gold by the Recording Industry Association of America (RIAA) in December 2016, for selling over 500,000 digital copies in the United States.

== Music video ==
The music video premiered on MTV on July 29, 2016.

== Charts ==
=== Weekly charts ===
Chart (2016)	Peak position
Canada (Canadian Hot 100)	25
France (SNEP)	129
UK Singles (OCC)	129
US Billboard Hot 100	36
US Hot R&B/Hip-Hop Songs (Billboard)	12

=== Year-end charts ===
Chart (2016)	Position
US Hot R&B/Hip-Hop Songs (Billboard)	82

== Certifications ==
Region	Certification	Certified units/sales
Canada (Music Canada)	Platinum	80,000^{‡}
United States (RIAA)	Platinum	1,000,000^{‡}
^{‡} Sales+streaming figures based on certification alone.

== Release history ==
Country	Date	Format	Label
United States	July 16, 2016	Digital download	Bad Boy; Interscope; Epic
United States	July 16, 2016	Rhythmic contemporary radio	Bad Boy; Interscope; Epic
