= Lockjaw (song) =

Single by French Montana featuring Kodak Black

from the album Wave Gods, MC4 and Montana
- Released: May 27, 2016
- Recorded: 2015
- Genre: Hip-hop; trap
- Length: 3:43
- Label: Epic
- Songwriters: Karim Kharbouch; Dieuson Octave; Khaled Khaled; Benjamin Diehl; Assil Youssef
- Producers: Ben Billions; Yo Asel

French Montana singles chronology
"Figure It Out" (2016)	"Lockjaw" (2016)	"No Shopping" (2016)

Kodak Black singles chronology
"Like Dat" (2016)	"Lockjaw" (2016)	"Going Viral" (2016)

Music video
- "Lockjaw" on YouTube

"Lockjaw" is a song by Moroccan-American rapper French Montana featuring fellow American rapper Kodak Black. It was released on May 27, 2016, as a single in promotion of the former's mixtape MC4. It was also originally on his twentieth mixtape Wave Gods. The track was written alongside DJ Khaled and producers Ben Billions and Yo Asel. The song is featured in the video game WWE 2K17 and The Contract DLC for Grand Theft Auto Online on the Radio Los Santos station. The song was certified Platinum by the Recording Industry Association of America (RIAA) in March 2017, for selling over 1,000,000 digital copies in the United States.

== Music video ==
The song's accompanying music video premiered on June 9, 2016 on French Montana's Vevo account on YouTube. It was directed by SpiffTV. Since its release, the video has received over 170 million views on YouTube. Scenes were shot between Port-au-Prince, Haiti and Broward County, Florida.

== Remix ==
The official remix features a newly additional verse by Gucci Mane. The second remix entitled "Clue Radio Remix" was released with DJ Clue featuring Jeezy, Rick Ross, DJ Khaled and the original Kodak Black.

== Lawsuit ==
Following the release of the song, Montana, along with co-artist Kodak Black and producer Ben Billions, were sued in 2016 by Moroccan producer Yo Asel. The lawsuit, filed in a New York federal court, alleged that the defendants unlawfully used a beat that Asel had created and sent to French Montana's team via email. Asel claimed he had not been credited or compensated for his work, which formed the basis of the hit song.

The case proceeded for several years. In 2018, it was reported that the parties had reached a settlement agreement to resolve the lawsuit out of court. The terms of the settlement were not disclosed to the public.

== Commercial performance ==
On the week of July 23, 2016, "Lockjaw" debuted at number 98 on the Billboard Hot 100, peaking at number 73 for two non-consecutive weeks, before leaving the chart after its appearance at number 99 the week of September 24. It reappeared at number 100 the week of October 8 but left the next week. The song made its second re-entry at number 97 on the week of November 5, 2016, moved to number 96 the week after before leaving completely, spending thirteen weeks on the chart.

=== Weekly charts ===
Chart (2016)	Peak position
US Billboard Hot 100	73
US Hot R&B/Hip-Hop Songs (Billboard)	23

=== Year-end charts ===
Chart (2016)	Position
US Hot R&B/Hip-Hop Songs (Billboard)	77

== Certifications ==
Region	Certification	Certified units/sales
Canada (Music Canada)	Platinum	80,000^{‡}
United States (RIAA)	2× Platinum	2,000,000^{‡}
^{‡} Sales+streaming figures based on certification alone.

== Release history ==
Region	Date	Format	Ref.
United States	May 27, 2016	Digital download	
