= MC4 (mixtape) =

Mixtape by French Montana
- Released: November 5, 2016
- Recorded: 2013–2016
- Genre: Hip hop
- Length: 58:28
- Labels: Coke Boys; Bad Boy; Maybach; Epic
- Producers: Ben Billions; Bizzy; CritaCal; Cubeatz; DannyBoyStyles; Detail; DJ Khaled; DJ Khalil; Earl and E; Harry Fraud; iLLA; LJ Milan; Maaly Raw; Masar; Murda Beatz; Rick Steel; Sauce Lord Rich; Sidney Swift; The Alchemist; The ANMLS; The Mekanics; The Superiors

French Montana chronology
Wave Gods (2016)	MC4 (2016)	Jungle Rules (2017)

Singles from MC4
- 1. "Figure It Out" Released: May 6, 2016; 2. "Lockjaw" Released: May 27, 2016; 3. "No Shopping" Released: July 16, 2016; 4. "Said N Done" Released: August 5, 2016; 5. "XPlicit" Released: September 2, 2016; 6. "Have Mercy" Released: September 2, 2016; 7. "2 Times" Released: September 2, 2016; 8. "Brick Road" Released: September 27, 2016; 9. "Paid For" Released: October 12, 2016

MC4 (abbreviation for Mac & Cheese 4) is the twenty-first mixtape by American rapper French Montana. MC4 was originally intended to be released as his second studio album. It was released on November 5, 2016, by Coke Boys Records, Bad Boy Records, Maybach Music Group and Epic Records. However, the album's release was canceled after Target unofficially released the album on CD on its original release date of August 19, 2016, two months before the album was set to release, which was later leaked online in its entirety. Subsequently, the album was heavily bootlegged. It was French Montana's last project released by Maybach Music Group before leaving the label.

MC4 is the fourth installment in the Mac & Cheese series, and was intended to be the first of the series to be released as an album. On November 5, 2016, Montana unexpectedly released the album as a mixtape instead and premiered it on Canadian rapper Drake's Beats 1 radio show, OVO Sound, later that night.

The mixtape features guest appearances from Kanye West, Miguel, Drake, Jeezy, ASAP Rocky, Kodak Black, Nas and Chinx. The album's production was handled by Harry Fraud, Murda Beatz, Detail, DJ Khalil, DannyBoyStyles and The Alchemist, among others.

== Release and promotion ==
On November 9, 2013, French Montana unveiled the original cover art for "Mac & Cheese 4" but had not specified whether it would be an album or a mixtape. The rapper had recently released his debut album Excuse My French earlier that year. On January 8, 2014, in an interview with Rolling Stone, he announced that MC4 would be his sophomore album dropping sometime later in the year. On June 29, 2014, in an interview with MTV News at the 2014 BET Awards, French revealed that his second album would be dropping in November, and would include appearances from the likes of Kanye West, will.i.am and then-fellow Coke Boys members Lil Durk and Chinx.

On December 8, 2014, French announced that he and longtime record producer Harry Fraud would be releasing a collaborative EP titled Mac & Cheese: The Appetizer, on December 16, 2014, to serve as a prequel to the upcoming album. Following delays, on December 19, French released Mac & Cheese: The Appetizer, consisting of seven tracks, with Harry Fraud On May 8, 2015, French released his twentieth mixtape, Casino Life 2. On October 26, 2015, French and Fetty Wap released their collaborative mixtape, Coke Zoo. French announced that his second album was pushed back for to an unspecified release sometime in 2016. On February 19, 2016, French released his twenty first mixtape, Wave Gods.

=== Unofficial release and original album leak ===
The album was set to be released on August 19, 2016, however, French tweeted a couple days before the original release that the album was pushed back for "sample clearance issues". However, the album was leaked in its entirety on August 19, 2016, on its original release date and two months before its new release date, due to Target unofficially releasing the album on CD despite the push back, which some people managed to get a hold of the album and release it on the internet as a leak, which was heavily bootlegged. Later on August 24, 2016, the CEO of French's main label, Epic Records, L.A. Reid, later stated that French's statement that he posted on Twitter was false, and the album was delayed because of the lack of hype for it, and Reid wanted to add hype by pushing it back.

=== Original cancellation and revival as a mixtape ===
French cancelled the project on October 6, 2016 because of the unofficial Target release, the album's leak and some "sample clearance issues" on tracks like "I'm Heated" and "2 Times". However, he also mentioned that a couple of the songs on the album will appear on his next mixtape. Despite the cancellation, the album has re-appeared on the iTunes Store for purchase as previously scheduled, but was again removed hours later. However, on November 5, 2016, Montana unexpectedly released the album as a mixtape instead and premiered it on Drake's Beats 1 radio show, OVO Sound radio later that night.

== Track listing ==
Credits adapted from Tidal and BMI.

No.	Title	Writer(s)	Producer(s)	Length
1.	"Ready (Intro)"	Karim Kharbouch; Leigh Elliott; Ahmad Balshe; Jason Quenneville; Danny Schofield; Abel Tesfaye; Gordon Sumner	Lee Major; Foreign Teck^{[b]}	4:38
2.	"Play Yaself"	Kharbouch; Rory Quigley; Peter Morén; John Eriksson; Björn Yttling	Harry Fraud	4:28
3.	"No Shopping" (featuring Drake)	Kharbouch; Shane Lindstrom; Tim Gomringer; Kevin Gomringer; Aubrey Graham	Murda Beatz; Cubeatz^{[a]}	3:47
4.	"2 Times"	Kharbouch; Jamaal Henry; Mary Brockert; Allen McGrier	Maaly Raw; CritaCal	3:46
5.	"Everytime" (featuring Jeezy)	Kharbouch; Earl Hood; Eric Goudy II; Larry Norton; Jay Jenkins	Earl & E	2:30
6.	"Said N Done" (featuring ASAP Rocky)	Kharbouch; Hood; Goudy II; Rakim Mayers; Mary Cross; Johnnie Frierson	Earl & E	3:05
7.	"I'm Heated"	Kharbouch; Sidney Swift; Mark Morales; Damon Wimbley	Swift	3:36
8.	"Lockjaw" (featuring Kodak Black)	Kharbouch; Benjamin Diehl; Khaled Khaled; Assil Youssef; Dieuson Octave	Ben Billions; Yo Asel	3:42
9.	"Check Come"	Kharbouch; Fisher; Swift; Joe Campion	Detail; Swift; Campion	5:37
10.	"Brick Road"	Kharbouch; Quigley; Fred Lowinger; Russ Mitkowski; Judson Nielsen	Harry Fraud	2:51
11.	"Xplicit" (featuring Miguel)	Kharbouch; Schofield; Miguel Pimentel; Diehl; Brandon Hollemon; Balshe	DannyBoyStyles; Ben Billions	3:40
12.	"Figure It Out" (featuring Kanye West and Nas)	Kharbouch; Kanye West; Nasir Jones; Khalil Abdul-Rahman; Erik Alcock	DJ Khalil; Rick Steel	4:01
13.	"Have Mercy" (featuring Beanie Sigel, Jadakiss and Styles P)	Kharbouch; Dwight Grant; Jason Phillips; David Styles; Ray Fraser; Khaled; Junior Brown; Roderick Harvey; Earl Lynch; Danny McKen; George Scarlett; Wendy Stewart; Headley Bennett; Huford Brown; Lloyd Ferguson; Robert Lyn; Roy Donat; Leroy Sibbles; Fitzroy Simpson; Mary Brockert; Allen McGrier	Illa; DJ Khaled	6:47
14.	"Chinx & Max / Paid For" (featuring Max B and Chinx)	Kharbouch; Alcock; Lorne Milan; Sidney Reynolds; Javon Reynolds; Charly Wingate; Lionel Pickens	Part 1 produced by The Superiors; LJ Milan; Rick Steel Part 2 produced by Harry Fraud; The Alchemist; Masar^{[b]}	9:06
Total length:				58:28

Notes

- ^{^[a]} signifies a co-producer
- "Xplicit" is stylized as "XPlicit"

Sample credits

- "Ready (Intro)" contains a sample from "Belong to the World", written by Abel Tesfaye, Danny Schofield, Ahmad Balshe, and Jason Quenneville, and performed by The Weeknd.
- "Check Come" contains samples from the viral video "Pranking My African Dad" made by British Nigerian YouTube personality Eman Kellam.
