= No Stylist (song) =

Single by French Montana featuring Drake

from the album Montana
- Released: September 20, 2018
- Recorded: 2018
- Genre: Hip hop; Trap
- Length: 3:12
- Label: Epic
- Songwriters: Karim Kharbouch; Aubrey Graham; London Holmes; Christian Ward; Floyd Bentley; Felix Pappalardi; Leslie Weistein; John Elis Ventura; Hector Chaparro; Christopher Dotson
- Producer: London on da Track

French Montana singles chronology
"Just Got Paid" (2018)	"No Stylist" (2018)	"Ya Nour El Ein" (2018)

Drake singles chronology
"Sicko Mode" (2018)	"No Stylist" (2018)	"Mia" (2018)

Music video
- "No Stylist" on YouTube

"No Stylist" is a song by Moroccan-American French Montana featuring Canadian rapper Drake. It was released on September 20, 2018. The song was released a single alongside an EP titled No Stylist / French Montana. It was later added to Montana's third studio album Montana, which was released in December 2019.

== Background ==
The song was previewed at the Tao Downtown Nightclub in New York City on August 21, 2018. In the song, Drake threw more shots at Kanye West by saying, "Yeah, keepin' it G, I told her "don't wear no 350s 'round me", referencing the Adidas sneaker, Adidas Yeezy.

== Music video ==
The song's accompanying music video was released on October 9, 2018. It featured cameos from ASAP Rocky, Cam’ron, Dapper Dan, Jean-Raymond, Young Thug, Luka Sabbat, and Slick Rick.

== Personnel ==
Credits adapted from Tidal.

- French Montana – vocals
- Drake – vocals
- London on da Track – production, programming
- Hector Chaparro – production, programming
- Floyd Bentley – background vocals
- Baruch "Mixx" Nembhard – recording engineering
- Sauce Miyagi – recording engineering
- Jaycen Joshua – mixing engineering
- Colin Leonard – mastering engineering
- Jacob Richards, Mike Seaberg, Rashawn Mclean – assistant engineering

== Charts ==
=== Weekly charts ===
Chart (2018–19)	Peak position
Australia (ARIA)	69
Austria (Ö3 Austria Top 40)	68
Belgium (Ultratip Bubbling Under Flanders)	14
Canada Hot 100 (Billboard)	16
Czech Republic Singles Digital (ČNS IFPI)	64
Germany (GfK)	66
Greece International Digital Singles (IFPI)	22
Ireland (IRMA)	33
Lithuania (AGATA)	29
Netherlands (Single Top 100)	84
New Zealand Hot Singles (RMNZ)	8
Norway (VG-lista)	26
Portugal (AFP)	52
Scottish Singles Sales (Official Charts)	74
Sweden (Sverigetopplistan)	54
Switzerland (Schweizer Hitparade)	36
UK Singles (Official Charts)	19
UK Hip Hop/R&B (Official Charts)	5
US Billboard Hot 100	47
US Hot R&B/Hip-Hop Songs (Billboard)	22
US Rhythmic Airplay (Billboard)	11

=== Year-end charts ===
Chart (2019)	Position
US Hot R&B/Hip-Hop Songs (Billboard)	87
US Rhythmic (Billboard)	48

== Certifications ==
Region	Certification	Certified units/sales
Australia (ARIA)	Platinum	70,000^{‡}
Canada (Music Canada)	3× Platinum	240,000^{‡}
Denmark (IFPI Danmark)	Gold	45,000^{‡}
Germany (BVMI)	Gold	200,000^{‡}
New Zealand (RMNZ)	Gold	15,000^{‡}
Poland (ZPAV)	Gold	10,000^{‡}
United Kingdom (BPI)	Platinum	600,000^{‡}
United States (RIAA)	2× Platinum	2,000,000^{‡}
^{‡} Sales+streaming figures based on certification alone.

== Release history ==
Region	Date	Format	Label	Ref.
Various	September 20, 2018	Digital download; streaming	Epic	
United States	October 16, 2019	Rhythmic contemporary	Epic	
