= Controlla =

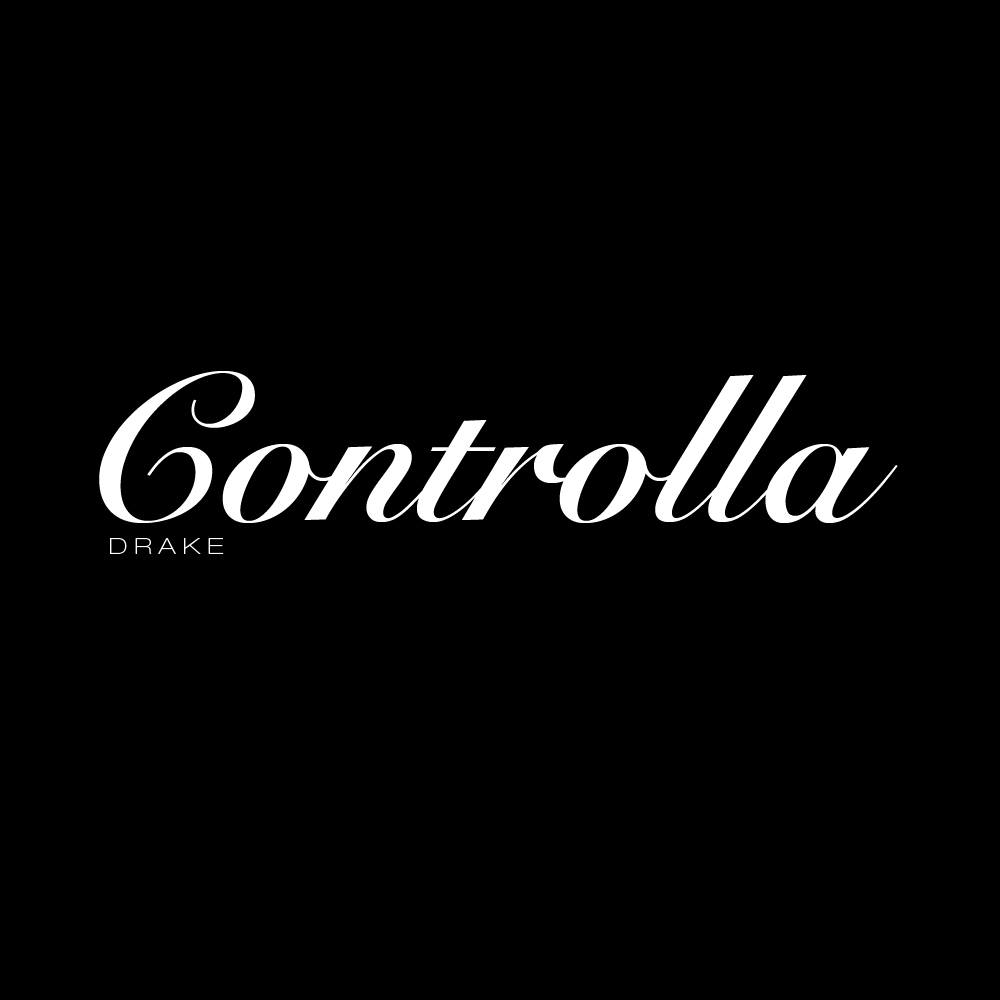

Single by Drake

from the album Views
- Released: June 7, 2016
- Recorded: 2015
- Genre: Dancehall
- Length: 4:05
- Label: Young Money; Cash Money; Republic
- Songwriters: Aubrey Graham; Matthew Samuels; Allen Ritter; Dwayne Chin-Quee; Stephen McGregor; Garfield Riley Jr.; Moses Davis; Donald Dennis; Gary Jackson; Patrick Roberts; Andrew Thomas; Andrae Hugh Sutherland; Melvyn Gonzalez
- Producers: Boi-1da, Supa Dups

Drake singles chronology
"Back on Road" (2016)	"Controlla" (2016)	"No Shopping" (2016)

"Controlla" is a song by Canadian rapper Drake, recorded for his fourth studio album Views. The song was released as the fourth single from the album in the US on June 7, 2016. The dancehall song was written by Drake, Matthew Samuels, Dwayne Chin-Quee, Stephen McGregor, Moses Davis, Produced by Boi-1da, Supa Dups, Di Genius, and Allen Ritter

It reached number 27 in Canada, number 18 in the UK, and number 16 on the US Billboard Hot 100. "Controlla" was the second dancehall single to be released from Views, along with "One Dance" and "Too Good".

Pitchfork listed "Controlla" on their ranking of the 100 best songs of 2016 at number 62.

== Background ==
Prior to the album's release, "Controlla" was one of two tracks from Views leaked online; The leaked version featured dancehall artist Popcaan. The song was still included on the album without Popcaan's contributions and an additional Drake verse plus a Beenie Man sample.

== Production and composition ==
"Controlla" was written by Drake, Matthew Samuels, Allen Ritter, Dwayne Chin-Quee, Stephen McGregor, Moses Davis, Donald Dennis, Gary Jackson, Patrick Roberts, Andrew Thomas, and produced by Boi-1da, Supa Dups, and Charles "Jamandass da Terminator" Omondi. In addition to Drake's lead vocals, the track contains samples of "Tear Off Mi Garment" performed by Beenie Man, though sources compared the song to Rihanna's "Work", the same track Drake was featured on.

== Track listing ==
Digital download
No.	Title	Length
1.	"Controlla"	4:05

== Charts ==
=== Weekly charts ===
Weekly chart performance for "Controlla"
Chart (2016)	Peak position
Australia (ARIA)	46
Belgium (Ultratip Bubbling Under Flanders)	8
Belgium (Ultratip Bubbling Under Wallonia)	9
Canada Hot 100 (Billboard)	27
Czech Republic Singles Digital (ČNS IFPI)	73
France (SNEP)	58
Germany (GfK)	83
Ireland (IRMA)	41
Italy (FIMI)	95
Netherlands (Dutch Tipparade 40)	23
Netherlands (Single Top 100)	30
New Zealand (Recorded Music NZ)	27
Portugal (AFP)	22
Scotland Singles (OCC)	66
Spain (Promusicae)	100
Sweden (Sverigetopplistan)	69
Switzerland (Schweizer Hitparade)	37
UK Singles (OCC)	18
UK Hip Hop/R&B (OCC)	5
US Billboard Hot 100	16
US Hot R&B/Hip-Hop Songs (Billboard)	5
US Pop Airplay (Billboard)	40
US Rhythmic Airplay (Billboard)	1

=== Year-end charts ===
2016 year-end chart performance for "Controlla"
Chart (2016)	Position
Canada (Canadian Hot 100)	66
France (SNEP)	200
Netherlands (Single Top 100)	76
Switzerland (Schweizer Hitparade)	92
UK Singles (OCC)	43
US Billboard Hot 100	41
US Hot R&B/Hip-Hop Songs (Billboard)	11
US Rhythmic (Billboard)	10

== Certifications ==
Certifications and sales for "Controlla"
Region	Certification	Certified units/sales
Australia (ARIA)	3× Platinum	210,000^{‡}
Brazil (Pro-Música Brasil)	Platinum	60,000^{‡}
Canada (Music Canada)	2× Platinum	160,000^{‡}
Denmark (IFPI Danmark)	Platinum	90,000^{‡}
France (SNEP)	Platinum	200,000^{‡}
Germany (BVMI)	Gold	200,000^{‡}
Italy (FIMI)	Gold	25,000^{‡}
Mexico (AMPROFON)	Gold	30,000^{‡}
New Zealand (RMNZ)	3× Platinum	90,000^{‡}
Portugal (AFP)	Platinum	10,000^{‡}
Spain (Promusicae)	Gold	30,000^{‡}
Sweden (GLF)	Platinum	40,000^{‡}
United Kingdom (BPI)	2× Platinum	1,200,000^{‡}
United States (RIAA)	5× Platinum	5,000,000^{‡}
^{‡} Sales+streaming figures based on certification alone.
