= Too Good =

2016 single by Drake featuring Rihanna

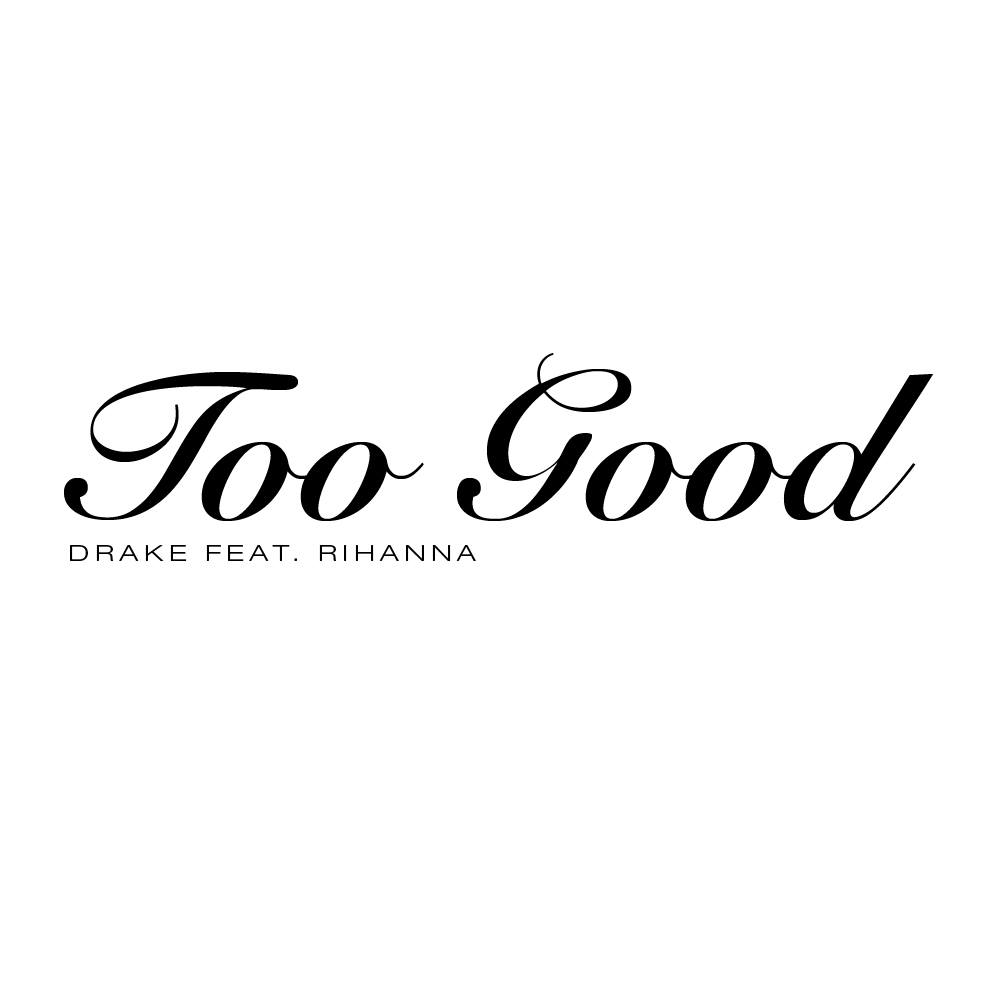

Single by Drake featuring Rihanna

from the album Views
- Released: July 26, 2016
- Recorded: 2015
- Studio: SOTA Studios (Toronto, ON)
- Genre: Dancehall
- Length: 4:23
- Label: Young Money; Cash Money; Republic
- Songwriters: Aubrey Graham; Robyn Fenty; Paul "Nineteen85" Jefferies; Maneesh Bidaye; Dwayne Chin-Quee; Andrew Hershey; Andre Sutherland; Atom Martin; Terence Lam
- Producers: Nineteen85; Supa Dups; Bidaye

Drake singles chronology
| "No Shopping" (2016) | "Too Good" (2016) | "Big Amount" (2016) |

Rihanna singles chronology
| "Sledgehammer" (2016) | "Too Good" (2016) | "Love on the Brain" (2016) |

"Too Good" is a song by Canadian rapper Drake, featuring Barbadian singer Rihanna, released in the United Kingdom on May 15, 2016, as the fourth single from his fourth studio album Views (2016), before later being serviced to US contemporary hit radio on July 26, 2016, as the fifth and final single from the album. It samples the dancehall song "Love Yuh Bad" performed by Popcaan and uses samples from wavrly.com. The song was co-written by Drake and Rihanna alongside Andrew Hershey, Andre Sutherland, Atom Martin, and the track's producers Nineteen85, Maneesh Bidaye, and Dwayne Chin-Quee.

"Too Good" was a commercial success, reaching number 9 in Canada, number 3 in the UK, and number 14 on the US Billboard Hot 100. Following "One Dance" and "Controlla", "Too Good" was the third dancehall single to be released from Views.

== Composition ==
"Too Good" is written in the key of D major and has a tempo of 118 beats per minute. The vocals in the song span from A_{3} to D_{5} with the song moving in common time.

== Production ==
"Too Good" came into fruition after both Drake and Rihanna recorded her 2016 single "Work", Drake recalled stating "I was like, I think I have one that would follow this one up really nicely. She got in the studio and just bodied it. It was like a flawless victory when she sent it back ... We have a genuine energy between us." "Too Good" was written by Drake, Paul Jefferies, Rihanna, Maneesh Bidaye, Diego Sanchez, Dwayne Chin-Quee, Andrew Hershey, Andre Sutherland, Atom Martin and Terence Lam, and produced by Nineteen85 and Supa Dups. In addition to Drake's lead vocals, the track features a guest appearance from Rihanna and contains vocal and lyrical samples of "Love Yuh Bad" performed by Popcaan. It is the fourth collaboration between Drake and Rihanna after "What's My Name?", "Take Care" and "Work".

== Critical reception ==
Matthew Ramirez of Pitchfork Media named the song "The Best New Track" of the day and "Too Good" a highlight from Views. Ramirez stated, ""Too Good" is a vestige of the same creative juices that flowed through "Work"'s Caribbean-inspired polyrhythm. (A similar influence is all over Views.) Drake clumsily interprets a Popcaan song that nineteen85 (of dvsn) ends up sampling anyway, but give him some credit for embracing his fake patois. This is one of a few songs on Views that benefits from his unabashed shamelessness in the same way that texting someone at 4 a.m. and claiming you did it on accident is shameless. ("I wanna benefit from the friendship/I wanna get the late night message" is the Drake-iest moment here.) People always feel unappreciated and overworked in their relationships, and here Drake and Rihanna nail that dynamic as only they can—mixing blunt neediness with lust."

Ed Masley of AZCentral said it revisited "the Caribbean dancehall rhythms" of Rihanna's “Work", and going on to note that Drake "and his greatest female duet partner trade off verses in a richly detailed he-said/she-said portrait of what may be going through the other person's head while you're busy convincing yourself that you're the only person putting any effort into this relationship."

Billboard ranked "Too Good" at number 32 on their "100 Best Pop Songs of 2016" list: “Drake hit the jackpot with the dancehall sound of "One Dance," but the addition of Caribbean queen Rihanna on this dueling duet takes his island vibe to the next level. Don't be fooled by the Views track's sunny beat, though: These two should really break up, if they know what's good for them.”

== Charts ==
=== Weekly charts ===
| Chart (2016) | Peak position |
|---|---|
| Australia (ARIA) | 3 |
| Australia Urban (ARIA) | 1 |
| Austria (Ö3 Austria Top 40) | 38 |
| Belgium (Ultratop 50 Flanders) | 9 |
| Belgium (Ultratop 50 Wallonia) | 30 |
| Canada Hot 100 (Billboard) | 9 |
| Czech Republic Singles Digital (ČNS IFPI) | 26 |
| Denmark (Tracklisten) | 14 |
| Euro Digital Song Sales (Billboard) | 11 |
| France (SNEP) | 29 |
| Germany (GfK) | 30 |
| Hungary (Single Top 40) | 30 |
| Ireland (IRMA) | 7 |
| Italy (FIMI) | 33 |
| Netherlands (Dutch Top 40) | 9 |
| Netherlands (Single Top 100) | 6 |
| New Zealand (Recorded Music NZ) | 4 |
| Norway (VG-lista) | 27 |
| Portugal (AFP) | 9 |
| Scottish Singles Sales (Official Charts) | 21 |
| Slovakia Airplay (ČNS IFPI) | 87 |
| Slovakia Singles Digital (ČNS IFPI) | 19 |
| Spain (Promusicae) | 41 |
| Sweden (Sverigetopplistan) | 13 |
| Switzerland (Schweizer Hitparade) | 25 |
| UK Singles (Official Charts) | 3 |
| UK Hip Hop/R&B (Official Charts) | 2 |
| US Billboard Hot 100 | 14 |
| US Adult Pop Airplay (Billboard) | 38 |
| US Dance Airplay (Billboard) | 15 |
| US Dance Club Songs (Billboard) | 32 |
| US Hot R&B/Hip-Hop Songs (Billboard) | 3 |
| US Pop Airplay (Billboard) | 9 |
| US Rhythmic Airplay (Billboard) | 1 |

=== Year-end charts ===
| Chart (2016) | Position |
|---|---|
| Australia (ARIA) | 34 |
| Australia Urban (ARIA) | 4 |
| Belgium (Ultratop Flanders) | 40 |
| Belgium (Ultratop Wallonia) | 85 |
| Canada (Canadian Hot 100) | 26 |
| Denmark (Tracklisten) | 48 |
| France (SNEP) | 100 |
| Germany (Official German Charts) | 65 |
| Italy (FIMI) | 72 |
| Netherlands (Dutch Top 40) | 62 |
| Netherlands (Single Top 100) | 26 |
| New Zealand (Recorded Music NZ) | 28 |
| Sweden (Sverigetopplistan) | 47 |
| Switzerland (Schweizer Hitparade) | 56 |
| UK Singles (Official Charts Company) | 18 |
| US Billboard Hot 100 | 29 |
| US Hot R&B/Hip-Hop Songs (Billboard) | 7 |
| US Mainstream Top 40 (Billboard) | 46 |
| US Rhythmic (Billboard) | 7 |

== Certifications ==
| Region | Certification | Certified units/sales |
|---|---|---|
| Australia (ARIA) | 6× Platinum | 420,000^{‡} |
| Belgium (BRMA) | Platinum | 20,000^{‡} |
| Canada (Music Canada) | 4× Platinum | 320,000^{‡} |
| Denmark (IFPI Danmark) | 2× Platinum | 180,000^{‡} |
| France (SNEP) | Platinum | 133,333^{‡} |
| Germany (BVMI) | Gold | 200,000^{‡} |
| Italy (FIMI) | 2× Platinum | 100,000^{‡} |
| Mexico (AMPROFON) | Platinum+Gold | 90,000^{‡} |
| New Zealand (RMNZ) | 4× Platinum | 120,000^{‡} |
| Portugal (AFP) | 2× Platinum | 20,000^{‡} |
| Spain (Promusicae) | Platinum | 60,000^{‡} |
| Sweden (GLF) | 3× Platinum | 120,000^{‡} |
| United Kingdom (BPI) | 3× Platinum | 1,800,000^{‡} |
| United States (RIAA) | 5× Platinum | 5,000,000^{‡} |
^{‡} Sales+streaming figures based on certification alone.

== Release history ==
Release dates and formats for "Too Good"
| Region | Date | Format | Label | Ref. |
|---|---|---|---|---|
| United States | July 26, 2016 | Contemporary hit radio | Republic | |
| Italy | October 7, 2016 | Radio airplay | Universal | |
