= Wave Gods =

Mixtape by French Montana
- Released: February 19, 2016
- Recorded: 2015
- Genre: Hip hop
- Length: 47:30
- Label: Coke Boys, Bad Boy, MMG
- Producer: AK47; Ben Billions; Black Metaphor; DJ Khalil; Arizona Slim; Harry Fraud; Jayze; Key Wane; London on da Track; Chize; Metro Boomin; Rick Steel; Southside; Tariq Beats; The Mekanics; Trakformaz; Wess; 88-Keys

French Montana chronology
Coke Zoo (2015)	Wave Gods (2016)	MC4 (2016)

Singles from Wave Gods
- 1. "Figure It Out" Released: May 6, 2016; 2. "Lockjaw" Released: May 27, 2016

Wave Gods is the twentieth mixtape by Moroccan rapper French Montana, released on February 19, 2016. The mixtape features guest appearances from Future, Kanye West, Nas, Travis Scott, Big Sean, Chris Brown, Quavo, Belly, Kodak Black, Puff Daddy, Jadakiss, Chinx and ASAP Rocky. Production was handled by AK47, Ben Billions, Black Metaphor, DJ Khalil, Harry Fraud, Jayze, Key Wane, London on da Track, Metro Boomin, Rick Steel, Southside, Tariq Beats, The Mekanics, Trakformaz and Wess.

A sequel to the mixtape, Coke Wave 2: Cosmos Brothers, which is a collaborative mixtape between Montana and Max B, the DJ of Wave Gods, is set to release on May 22, 2026.

== Track listing ==
No.	Title	Producer(s)	Length
1.	"Wave Gods (Intro)" (featuring Chris Brown)	Harry Fraud; The Mekanics; AK47	2:26
2.	"Miley Cyrus" (featuring Future)	The Mekanics; Tariq Beats	4:20
3.	"Sanctuary Part II" (featuring Hikaru Utada)	Black Metaphor	5:17
4.	"Figure It Out" (featuring Kanye West and Nas)	DJ Khalil; Rick Steel	4:00
5.	"Man of My City" (featuring Travis Scott and Big Sean)	Metro Boomin; Southside	3:22
6.	"Max B Interlude"		1:42
7.	"Holy Moly"	Key Wane	3:00
8.	"Groupie Love" (featuring Quavo)	London on da Track	4:13
9.	"Jackson 5" (featuring Belly)	The Mekanics; Jayze; Wess	3:47
10.	"Lockjaw" (featuring Kodak Black)	Ben Billions	3:48
11.	"Puff Interlude"		1:16
12.	"Old Man Wildin'" (featuring Puff Daddy and Jadakiss)	88-Keys	3:07
13.	"All Over" (featuring Chinx)	Arizona Slim; Chize	3:17
14.	"Off the Rip (Remix)" (featuring ASAP Rocky and Chinx)	Trakformaz	3:55

Notes

- "Old Man Wildin'" features uncredited vocals by Manolo Rose.
- "Lockjaw" and "Figure It Out" are also included on his canceled second studio album MC4.
- "Man of My City" features uncredited vocals by K Camp.
- "Sanctuary Part II" features uncredited vocals and sampling by Hikaru Utada.
