= Views (album) =

Studio album by Drake
- Released: April 29, 2016
- Recorded: 2015–2016
- Studios: The Connaught Hotel (London); CR3; S.O.T.A. (Toronto); Sandra Gale Studio (Yolo Estate, California); Triangle (Atlanta)
- Genres: Hip-hop; R&B; dancehall; pop
- Length: 81:14
- Labels: Cash Money; Republic; Young Money
- Producers: 40; Boi-1da; Frank Dukes; Jordan Ullman; Kanye West; Maneesh Bidaye; Murda Beatz; Nineteen85; Sevn Thomas; Southside

Drake chronology
| What a Time to Be Alive (2015) | Views (2016) | More Life (2017) |

Singles from Views
- 1. "Hotline Bling" Released: July 31, 2015; 2. "One Dance" Released: April 5, 2016; 3. "Pop Style" Released: April 5, 2016; 4. "Controlla" Released: June 7, 2016; 5. "Too Good" Released: July 26, 2016

Views is the fourth studio album by Canadian rapper Drake. It was released on April 29, 2016, by Cash Money Records, Republic Records, and Young Money Entertainment. Recording sessions took place from 2015 to 2016, with both Drake and his longtime collaborator and record producer 40 serving as the record's executive producers. 40 also primarily handled the production on the album alongside Nineteen85, Maneesh Bidaye, Kanye West, and Jordan Ullman, among others. It also features guest appearances by PartyNextDoor, the late Pimp C, Dvsn, Wizkid, Kyla, Future, and Rihanna.

Views takes influence from West Indian and West African music. The album marks Drake's first full foray into Jamaican dancehall music, while also featuring other genres such as R&B, trap, Afrobeats, UK funky, and pop. Similar to his previous records, the album sees Drake discussing romance, experiences with betrayal, and celebrations of loyalty and friendship. The album was supported by five singles: "One Dance", which topped the US Billboard Hot 100, "Hotline Bling", "Pop Style", "Controlla", and "Too Good".

Views debuted at number one on the US Billboard 200, with 1.04 million album-equivalent units in its first week of release, including 852,000 copies, and achieving a then-record over 245 million streams. It spent 13 non-consecutive weeks at number one on the Billboard 200 and became Drake's first number-one album on the UK Albums Chart. All 20 songs from the album charted on the Billboard Hot 100.

Views received generally favorable reviews from critics, though many found it to be an overlong retread of Drake's previous work. Despite this, it became one of Drake's most commercially successful albums having been certified Diamond by the Recording Industry Association of America (RIAA) and six-times platinum by Music Canada. It was nominated for Album of the Year at the 2017 Grammy Awards and won Top Billboard 200 Album and Top Rap Album at the 2017 Billboard Music Awards, among other awards.

== Background ==
The album's title was first announced as Views from the 6, as it first appeared from a report in a July 2014 article from Billboard. According to Drake on Twitter, "the 6" is a reference to his hometown of Toronto, Ontario. On April 29, 2016, it was revealed that the title had been shortened to Views.

== Artwork ==
The cover artwork for Views was released via Drake's Twitter account on April 24, 2016, which features Drake sitting atop the CN Tower in Toronto. The fact that Drake was significantly larger than life-size on the cover was widely discussed, and CN Tower's Twitter account later confirmed it to be photoshopped. The album cover and booklet were shot by Toronto-based photographer Caitlin Cronenberg.

== Themes and production ==
Songs on Views see Drake discussing his relationship woes, experiences with betrayal, and celebrations of loyalty and friendship. Writing for Vice, Emma Garland said that what the album "lacks in lyrical sentiment, it makes up for in musical experimentation and production." Garland further define the album as a "minimal nuance of If You're Reading This It's Too Late [that] has bloomed into the more fleshed-out format of Take Care." Elliott Sharp of Red Bull Music described the album's vibe as "chill, slow, smooth, soft, silk, and sleepy". In an interview with Apple Music's Zane Lowe, Drake said that the theme of the album is the "haphazard, ever-changing weather in Toronto."

Views takes influence from West Indian and West African music, while it marks Drake's first full foray into Jamaican dancehall music, after having previously explored the genre on his 2015 mixtape, If You're Reading This It's Too Late. Of the five singles released from Views, three were primarily dancehall songs ("One Dance", "Controlla" and "Too Good"). Other genres featured on the album include R&B, hip hop, trap, Afrobeat, UK funky, and pop.

== Promotion ==
Drake premiered a single, titled "Summer Sixteen" through OVO Sound Radio on January 30, 2016. The track was produced by 40, Boi-1da and Cubeatz. The song contains a slowed-down sample of "Glass Tubes" performed by Brian Bennett. The cover art was designed by Filip Pągowski, who was a creator of the Comme des Garçons logo. The song peaked at number six on the US Billboard Hot 100, selling 215,000 copies in its first week, making it the highest debut sales of Drake's career. As of March 27, 2016, the single sold 358,000 copies in the United States.

On April 4, 2016, the album was initially teased in London. On April 9, Drake released a trailer for Views on Twitter. On April 26, Drake revealed that Views would include 20 songs, more than any of his previous albums, excluding the bonus tracks. After his last "pop-up" store stop in his home city of Toronto, Drake released the album's cover artwork on social media. On April 29, the album premiered on Apple Music's OVO Sound Radio, following his interview with Beats 1's radio host Zane Lowe, and then released on both Apple Music and iTunes exclusively, followed by a release on to other digital retailers and a physical release a week later, and a release on to other streaming services a week after that. On May 14, Drake was the host and musical guest on an episode of Saturday Night Live, where he sang "One Dance" and "Hype". On September 26, Drake released a short film on Apple Music, titled "Please Forgive Me", which features several songs from Views.

=== Singles ===
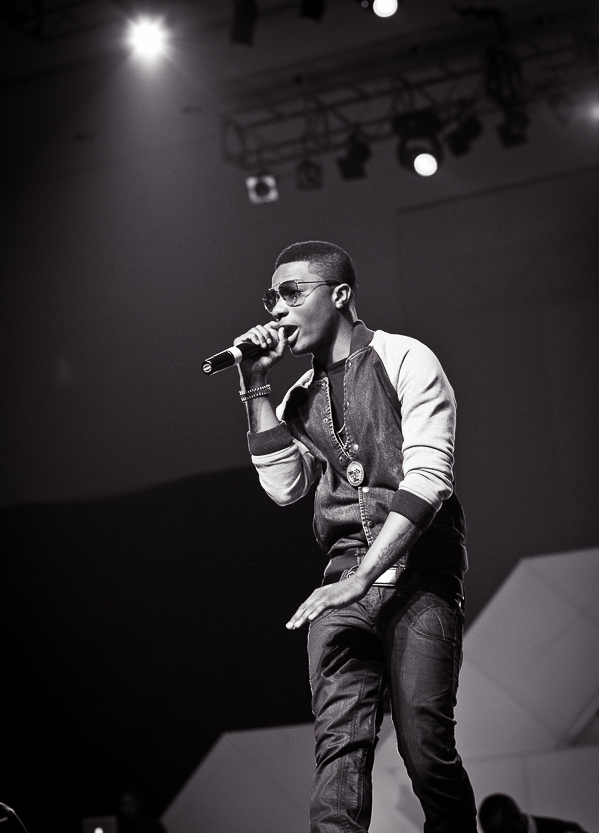
Nigerian Afrobeats artist Wizkid was involved in the writing and production of "One Dance".

"Hotline Bling" was released as the album's lead single on July 31, 2015, the song was produced by Nineteen85. Despite the song being released as the official lead single for Views, "Hotline Bling" was included as the bonus track on the physical album. (Note: The digital version, including the streaming service version, Hotline Bling is not classified as bonus track.)

"One Dance" was released as the album's second single on April 5, 2016. The song features guest appearances from Nigerian singer Wizkid and British singer Kyla. Wizkid also co-wrote and co-produced the song. Nineteen85 also produced the song, with co-production by DJ Maphorisa and Drake's longtime collaborator 40. It spent 15 consecutive weeks atop the UK Singles Chart.

"Pop Style" was released as the album's third single on April 5, 2016. The song features guest appearances from American hip hop duo The Throne (composed of rappers Kanye West and Jay-Z), while the production was handled by Sevn Thomas and Frank Dukes, with additional production by Drake's longtime collaborator Boi-1da, alongside 40. Upon the release, Drake removed The Throne's verses, and then re-recorded his own verses as a part of their replacement verses to the song.

"Controlla" was released as the album's fourth single in the United States on June 7, 2016. The song was produced by Boi-1da, with co-production by Supa Dups and Allen Ritter, with additional production by Di Genius. The leaked version features a guest appearance from Jamaican dancehall artist Popcaan.

"Too Good" was released as the album's fifth single on July 26, 2016. The song features a guest appearance from Barbadian singer Rihanna, while the production was handled by Nineteen85, with additional production by Supa Dups.

=== Other songs ===
In August 2014, a one-minute-long snippet, titled "Views from the Six" was leaked online. On September 24, 2016, an extended version of "Faithful" with two additional verses from Dvsn was premiered on OVO Sound Radio. On May 21, 2016, the remix version for "Hype" featuring Lil Wayne, premiered on OVO Sound Radio. On February 17, 2017, Future premiered an extended cut of the song "Grammys" with additional verse from himself on his radio show, Freebandz Radio.

== Critical reception ==
Professional ratings
Aggregate scores
| Source | Rating |
|---|---|
| AnyDecentMusic? | 6.7/10 |
| Metacritic | 69/100 |
Review scores
| Source | Rating |
| AllMusic | 2.5/5 stars |
| The A.V. Club | B− |
| The Daily Telegraph | 3/5 stars |
| Entertainment Weekly | B |
| The Guardian | 4/5 stars |
| NME | 4/5 |
| The Observer | 4/5 stars |
| Pitchfork | 6.8/10 |
| Rolling Stone | 3.5/5 stars |
| Spin | 7/10 |

Views was met with generally favorable reviews from critics. At Metacritic, which assigns a normalized rating out of 100 to reviews from mainstream publications, the album received an average score of 69, based on 31 reviews, indicating "generally favorable reviews". Aggregator AnyDecentMusic? gave it 6.7 out of 10, based on their assessment of the critical consensus.

Many reviewers found it overlong and lacking in a cohesive theme, while claiming Drake was not challenging himself artistically; according to MTV's Meghan Garvey, the unenthusiastic response to the record may have been attributed to Drake's "unwillingness (or inability) to significantly evolve beyond his time-tested signature sound, clinging to the comfort of the same frosty 40 beats, zingy aphorisms, and perennial trust issues". Reviewing Views in The New York Times, Jon Caramanica said Drake's "emotional excavations aren't as striking as they were a few years ago, when they had the sting of the new to them." In The A.V. Club, Evan Rytlewski argued that he had "done this before and done it better", describing the album as "too long and stubbornly low energy". Neil McCormick wrote in The Daily Telegraph that in spite of some evocative production and Drake's impressive rapping skills, his continued "navel gazing" demonstrated a lack of emotional maturity and insight. Andy Gill of The Independent was more critical, panning the album as "utterly wearying and unpersuasive" while declaring that "rarely has one man moaned quite so much about so little."

Alexis Petridis wrote a largely positive review in The Guardian, arguing that Views "offers a lengthy inventory of miseries, cleverly offset by a sly sense of humour and eclectic sound". He deemed it "compelling evidence that this is the defining pop artist of the moment". In The Observer, Kitty Empire found the lyrical and production detail "pin-sharp", and Mojo's Andy Cowan wrote that the overly introspective themes were redeemed by Drake's nimble flow and clever sense of humor. NME journalist Nick Levine said his "signature brand of downbeat introspection remains gripping". Los Angeles Times critic Mikael Wood wrote that the record "sets his harshest thoughts about women against the prettiest, most sensual music he's ever made", featuring a number of "deeply beautiful tracks" that "further dismantles whatever barrier was left between rap and R&B following Drake's earlier albums". In 2026, Complex lauded Views as Drake's best album.

=== Year-end lists ===
Select year-end rankings of Views
| Publication | List | Rank | Ref. |
|---|---|---|---|
| Billboard | Best Albums of 2016 | 17 | |
| The Guardian | The Best Albums of 2016 | 20 | |
| The New York Times | The Best Albums of 2016 (Jon Caramanica) | 10 | |
| NME | NME's Albums of the Year 2016 | 17 | |
| HotNewHipHop | Hottest 20 Albums of 2016 | 20 | |
| People | Top 10 Albums of 2016 | 5 | |
| Rolling Stone | 50 Best Albums of 2016 | 42 | |
| Vibe | The 25 Best Albums of 2016 | 9 | |

=== Industry awards ===
Awards and nominations for Views
| Year | Ceremony | Category | Result | Ref. |
|---|---|---|---|---|
| 2016 | American Music Awards | Favorite Pop/Rock Album | Nominated | |
| 2016 | American Music Awards | Favorite Rap/Hip-Hop Album | Won | |
| 2016 | BET Hip Hop Awards | Album of the Year | Won | |
| 2016 | Soul Train Music Awards | Best Album of the Year | Nominated | |
| 2017 | Billboard Music Awards | Top Billboard 200 Album | Won | |
| 2017 | Billboard Music Awards | Top Rap Album | Won | |
| 2017 | Grammy Awards | Album of the Year | Nominated | |
| 2017 | Grammy Awards | Best Rap Album | Nominated | |
| 2017 | iHeartRadio Music Awards | Hip-Hop Album of the Year | Won | |

== Commercial performance ==
In Drake's home country of Canada, Views sold 110,000 album-equivalent units, and sold 92,000. In the United States, Views debuted at number one on the US Billboard 200, with 1.04 million album-equivalent units in its first week of release, including 852,000 pure album sales and over 245 million streams (despite the album, with the exclusion of its singles released at the time, only available to stream on Apple Music for the first two weeks), more than previous record 115.2 million by Beyoncé's Lemonade (despite that album only available to stream on Tidal). It had the biggest week for an album since Adele's 25 collected 1.19 million units in its fifth week of release (week ending December 24, 2015). The last album by a male artist to post a bigger pure album sales week was Justin Timberlake's The 20/20 Experience, when it debuted with 968,000 copies sold in the week ending March 24, 2013. Views became Drake's sixth consecutive number-one album (fifth as solo artist) on the Billboard 200 and largest sales week. It stayed in the top spot for nine consecutive weeks, and spent a total of 13 non-consecutive weeks at number one. In the year 2016, it accumulated 4.14 million equivalent album units, of which 1.6 million were pure sales, ranking as the second best-selling album of the year in pure sales, and the most-consumed album based on album-equivalent units.

In the United Kingdom, the album debuted at number one on the UK Albums Chart, with 78,000 sales, becoming Drake's first number-one on that chart. With Views, Drake also joined Adele, Michael Bublé, and Taylor Swift as the only artists in the 2010s decade to have an album remain at number one on the Billboard 200 for six consecutive weeks. Overall, as of 2016, Views has attained one billion streams in the United States, according to his record label. As of April 2018, Views has sold 1.73 million recognized copies and a total of 5.41 million album-equivalent units in the United States.

Nearly every song from Views charted on the Billboard Hot 100 during its debut week; Drake held 20 songs on the chart. As a result, he broke the record for most songs on the Billboard Hot 100, simultaneously. He would later go on to break his own record twice, once through More Life in 2017, and again through Scorpion in 2018. Several of the songs on the album also went platinum by the Recording Industry Association of America (RIAA).

Views was ranked as the second most popular album of 2016 on the Billboard 200. The following year it was ranked as the thirteenth most popular album of the 2017, and in 2018, two years after its release, the album was ranked as the forty-seventh most popular album of the year.

== Track listing ==
Views track listing
| No. | Title | Writer(s) | Producer(s) | Length |
|---|---|---|---|---|
| 1. | "Keep the Family Close" | Aubrey Graham; Maneesh Bidaye | Bidaye | 5:28 |
| 2. | "9" | Graham; Noah Shebib; Matthew Samuels; Brian Alexander Morgan; David Brooks; Craig Marsh; Craig Harrisingh; David Harrisingh | 40; Boi-1da^{[a]}; Morgan^{[a]} | 4:15 |
| 3. | "U with Me?" | Graham; Shebib; Kanye West; Dacoury Natche; Ricci Riera; Axel Morgan; Jahron Brathwaite; Anderson Hernandez; Ozan Yildirim; Dave Goode; Earl Simmons; Mark Andrews; Anthony Fields; Tamir Ruffin; Phillip Weatherspoon | 40; West; DJ Dahi^{[a]}; Riera^{[a]}; Axlfolie^{[a]}; Vinylz^{[b]}; Oz^{[b]} | 4:57 |
| 4. | "Feel No Ways" | Graham; Shebib; Jordan Ullman; Anne Dudley; Malcolm McLaren; Nayvadius Wilburn | Ullman; 40^{[b]}; West^{[b]} | 4:00 |
| 5. | "Hype" | Graham; Samuels; Paul Jefferies; Anthony Tucker; Kevin Gomringer; Tim Gomringer; Maurice Jordan | Boi-1da; Nineteen85; The Beat Bully^{[a]}; Cubeatz^{[b]} | 3:29 |
| 6. | "Weston Road Flows" | Graham; Shebib; Steven Vidal; Mary Blige; Sean Combs; Carl Thompson; Jon Levine; David Carty | 40; Stwo^{[a]} | 4:13 |
| 7. | "Redemption" | Graham; Shebib; Michael Olsen; William Norwood; LaShawn Daniels; Freddie Jerkins; Rodney Jerkins | 40 | 5:33 |
| 8. | "With You" (featuring PartyNextDoor) | Graham; Jefferies; Brathwaite; Shane Lindstrom; Carl McCormick | Murda Beatz; Nineteen85^{[b]} | 3:15 |
| 9. | "Faithful" (featuring Pimp C and Dvsn) | Graham; Shebib; Samuels; Jefferies; Daniel Daley; Chad Butler; Bryan-Michael Cox; Johntá Austin; Kevin Hicks | 40; Boi-1da^{[a]}; Nineteen85^{[a]} | 4:50 |
| 10. | "Still Here" | Graham; Shebib; Jahmar Carter | Daxz; 40^{[a]}; Bidaye^{[b]} | 3:09 |
| 11. | "Controlla" | Graham; Samuels; Allen Ritter; Dwayne Chin-Quee; Stephen McGregor; Garfield Riley Jr.; Moses Davis; Donald Dennis; Gary Jackson; Patrick Roberts; Andrew Thomas | Boi-1da; Supa Dups^{[a]}; Ritter^{[a]}; Di Genius^{[b]} | 4:05 |
| 12. | "One Dance" (featuring Wizkid and Kyla) | Graham; Jefferies; Shebib; Ayodeji Balogun; Errol Reid; Kyla Smith | Nineteen85; 40^{[a]}; Wizkid^{[a]}; DJ Maphorisa^{[c]} | 2:54 |
| 13. | "Grammys" (featuring Future) | Graham; Shebib; Wilburn; Joshua Luellen; Ronald LaTour; Daveon Jackson | 40; Southside; Cardo^{[a]}; Yung Exclusive^{[a]} | 3:40 |
| 14. | "Childs Play" | Graham; Shebib; Leland Wayne; Mark Morales; Darren Robinson; Damon Wimbley | 40; Metro Boomin^{[b]}; Ullman^{[b]}; Nineteen85^{[b]} | 4:01 |
| 15. | "Pop Style" | Graham; Rupert Thomas, Jr.; Adam Feeney; Samuels; Shebib; West; Shawn Carter | Sevn Thomas; Frank Dukes; Boi-1da^{[b]}; 40^{[b]} | 3:32 |
| 16. | "Too Good" (featuring Rihanna) | Graham; Jefferies; Bidaye; Chin-Quee; Robyn Fenty; Andrew Hershey; Andre Sutherland; Atom Martin; Terence Lam | Nineteen85; Supa Dups^{[b]} | 4:23 |
| 17. | "Summers Over Interlude" | Bidaye; Majid Al Maskati | Bidaye | 1:46 |
| 18. | "Fire & Desire" | Graham; Shebib; Brandy Norwood; Rochad Holiday; Curtis Wilson; William Young | 40; Hagler^{[b]}; Jordan Lewis^{[b]} | 3:58 |
| 19. | "Views" | Graham; Bidaye; Samuels; Aion Clarke | Bidaye; 40^{[b]}; Boi-1da^{[b]} | 5:11 |
| 20. | "Hotline Bling" (bonus track) | Graham; Jefferies; Timmy Thomas | Nineteen85 | 4:27 |
| Total length: | | | | 81:14 |

Track notes

- ^{^[a]} signifies a co-producer
- ^{^[b]} signifies an additional producer
- ^{^[c]} signifies an uncredited co-producer

Sample credits

- "9" contains a sample of "Dying", performed by Mavado featuring Serani.
- "U with Me?" contains a sample of "What These Bitches Want"; and contains an interpolation of "How's It Goin' Down", performed by DMX.
- "Weston Road Flows" contains a sample of "Mary's Joint", performed by Mary J. Blige.
- "One Dance" contains a sample of "Do You Mind (Crazy Cousins Remix)", performed by Paleface featuring Kyla.
- "Feel No Ways" contains a sample of "World's Famous", performed by Malcolm McLaren.
- "Redemption" contains a sample of "One Wish", performed by Ray J.
- "Faithful" contains samples of "Get Gone", performed by Ideal; and "Tom Ford (Remix)", performed by Jay-Z featuring Pimp C.
- "Controlla" contains a sample of "Tear Off Mi Garment", performed by Beenie Man.
- "Childs Play" contains a sample of "Like a Soldier", performed by Ha-Sizzle.
- "Too Good" contains a sample of "Love Yuh Bad", performed by Popcaan.
- "Fire & Desire" contains a sample of "I Dedicate (Part II)", performed by Brandy.
- "Views" contains a sample of "The Question Is", performed by The Winans.
- "Hotline Bling" contains a sample of "Why Can't We Live Together", performed by Timmy Thomas.

== Personnel ==
Credits adapted from the album's liner notes.

Performance

- Drake – vocals
- PartyNextDoor – background vocals (3)
- Baka – background vocals (5)
- Divine Brown – background vocals (3)
- Darhyl "Hey DJ" Camper Jr. – background vocals (7, 9)
- Aion "Voyce" Clarke – background vocals (1, 19)
- Beverly Crandon – background vocals (16)
- Daniel Daley – background vocals (4)
- Sabrina Galmo – background vocals (1)
- Jelleestone – background vocals (2)
- Jeremih – background vocals (8)
- James Vincent McMorrow – background vocals (5)
- Beenie Man – background vocals (11)
- Majid Al Maskati – background vocals (17)

Musicians

- Maneesh Bidaye – instruments (1, 16, 17, 19)
- Boi-1da – drum programmer (2, 5, 9, 15)
- Chantal Dube – harp (1, 3, 14)
- Greg Moffett – additional bass (3)
- Brian Morgan – drum programmer (2)
- Michael Olsen – cello (3, 4, 5, 6, 7, 9, 11, 14)
- Dalton Tennant – additional keyboards (3)

Technical

- Noel Cadastre – recording
- Greg Moffett – recording
- Noah "40" Shebib – recording
- Harley Arsenault – assistant recording
- Noel "Gadget" Campbell – mixer
- Michael Brooks – assistant mixer
- Peter "Zlender" Vickers – assistant mixer (20)
- Chris Athens – mastering
- Dave Huffman – assistant mastering

Miscellaneous

- Caitlin Cronenberg – album photography
- Nicky Orenstein – art direction, design

== Charts ==
=== Weekly charts ===
2016 chart performance for Views
| Chart (2016) | Peak position |
|---|---|
| Australian Albums (ARIA) | 1 |
| Austrian Albums (Ö3 Austria) | 20 |
| Belgian Albums (Ultratop Flanders) | 3 |
| Belgian Albums (Ultratop Wallonia) | 13 |
| Canadian Albums (Billboard) | 1 |
| Czech Albums (ČNS IFPI) | 16 |
| Danish Albums (Hitlisten) | 1 |
| Dutch Albums (Album Top 100) | 3 |
| Finnish Albums (Suomen virallinen lista) | 2 |
| French Albums (SNEP) | 4 |
| German Albums (Offizielle Top 100) | 11 |
| Greek Albums (IFPI) | 22 |
| Hungarian Albums (MAHASZ) | 31 |
| Irish Albums (IRMA) | 2 |
| Italian Albums (FIMI) | 10 |
| Japanese Albums (Oricon) | 97 |
| New Zealand Albums (RMNZ) | 1 |
| Norwegian Albums (VG-lista) | 1 |
| Portuguese Albums (AFP) | 6 |
| Scottish Albums (Official Charts) | 2 |
| Spanish Albums (Promusicae) | 12 |
| Swedish Albums (Sverigetopplistan) | 2 |
| Swiss Albums (Schweizer Hitparade) | 4 |
| UK Albums (Official Charts) | 1 |
| UK R&B Albums (Official Charts) | 1 |
| US Billboard 200 | 1 |
| US Top R&B/Hip-Hop Albums (Billboard) | 1 |

2025 chart performance for Views
| Chart (2025) | Peak position |
|---|---|
| Nigerian Albums (TurnTable) | 70 |

=== Year-end charts ===
2016 year-end chart performance for Views
| Chart (2016) | Position |
|---|---|
| Australian Albums (ARIA) | 14 |
| Belgian Albums (Ultratop Flanders) | 49 |
| Belgian Albums (Ultratop Wallonia) | 117 |
| Canadian Albums (Billboard) | 3 |
| Danish Albums (Hitlisten) | 4 |
| Dutch Albums (MegaCharts) | 11 |
| French Albums (SNEP) | 40 |
| German Albums (Offizielle Top 100) | 100 |
| Icelandic Albums (Plötutíóindi) | 20 |
| New Zealand Albums (RMNZ) | 7 |
| Swedish Albums (Sverigetopplistan) | 4 |
| Swiss Albums (Schweizer Hitparade) | 76 |
| UK Albums (OCC) | 8 |
| US Billboard 200 | 2 |
| US Top R&B/Hip-Hop Albums (Billboard) | 1 |

2017 year-end chart performance for Views
| Chart (2017) | Position |
|---|---|
| Australian Albums (ARIA) | 91 |
| Canadian Albums (Billboard) | 9 |
| Danish Albums (Hitlisten) | 22 |
| New Zealand Albums (RMNZ) | 24 |
| Swedish Albums (Sverigetopplistan) | 62 |
| UK Albums (OCC) | 52 |
| US Billboard 200 | 13 |
| US Top R&B/Hip-Hop Albums (Billboard) | 10 |

2018 year-end chart performance for Views
| Chart (2018) | Position |
|---|---|
| Canadian Albums (Billboard) | 38 |
| Danish Albums (Hitlisten) | 68 |
| US Billboard 200 | 47 |
| US Top R&B/Hip-Hop Albums (Billboard) | 27 |

2019 year-end chart performance for Views
| Chart (2019) | Position |
|---|---|
| US Billboard 200 | 69 |
| US Top R&B/Hip-Hop Albums (Billboard) | 33 |

2020 year-end chart performance for Views
| Chart (2020) | Position |
|---|---|
| US Billboard 200 | 98 |

2021 year-end chart performance for Views
| Chart (2021) | Position |
|---|---|
| US Billboard 200 | 103 |

2022 year-end chart performance for Views
| Chart (2022) | Position |
|---|---|
| US Billboard 200 | 80 |
| US Top R&B/Hip-Hop Albums | 56 |

2023 year-end chart performance for Views
| Chart (2023) | Position |
|---|---|
| US Billboard 200 | 60 |
| US Top R&B/Hip-Hop Albums (Billboard) | 33 |

2024 year-end chart performance for Views
| Chart (2024) | Position |
|---|---|
| Australian Hip Hop/R&B Albums (ARIA) | 33 |
| US Billboard 200 | 79 |
| US Top R&B/Hip-Hop Albums (Billboard) | 27 |

2025 year-end chart performance for Views
| Chart (2025) | Position |
|---|---|
| Australian Albums (ARIA) | 94 |
| Belgian Albums (Ultratop Flanders) | 173 |
| Dutch Albums (Album Top 100) | 98 |
| US Billboard 200 | 69 |
| US Top R&B/Hip-Hop Albums (Billboard) | 18 |

=== Decade-end charts ===
Decade-end chart performance for Views
| Chart (2010–2019) | Position |
|---|---|
| US Billboard 200 | 9 |

== Certifications ==
Certifications for Views
| Region | Certification | Certified units/sales |
|---|---|---|
| Australia (ARIA) | 2× Platinum | 140,000^{‡} |
| Austria (IFPI Austria) | Gold | 7,500^{*} |
| Canada (Music Canada) | 6× Platinum | 480,000^{‡} |
| Denmark (IFPI Danmark) | 6× Platinum | 120,000^{‡} |
| France (SNEP) | 3× Platinum | 300,000^{‡} |
| Germany (BVMI) | Gold | 100,000^{‡} |
| Italy (FIMI) | Platinum | 50,000^{‡} |
| Mexico (AMPROFON) | Platinum+Gold | 90,000^{^} |
| Netherlands (NVPI) | Platinum | 40,000^{‡} |
| New Zealand (RMNZ) | 6× Platinum | 90,000^{‡} |
| Poland (ZPAV) | Platinum | 20,000^{‡} |
| Singapore (RIAS) | Platinum | 10,000^{*} |
| Sweden (GLF) | 2× Platinum | 80,000^{‡} |
| United Kingdom (BPI) | 3× Platinum | 900,000^{‡} |
| United States (RIAA) | Diamond | 10,000,000^{‡} |
^{*} Sales figures based on certification alone.^{^} Shipments figures based on certification alone.^{‡} Sales+streaming figures based on certification alone.

== See also ==
- 2016 in hip hop music
- List of number-one albums of 2016 (Australia)
- List of number-one albums of 2016 (Canada)
- List of number-one albums from the 2010s (New Zealand)
- List of UK Albums Chart number ones of the 2010s
- List of UK R&B Albums Chart number ones of 2016
- List of Billboard 200 number-one albums of 2016
- List of Billboard number-one R&B/hip-hop albums of 2016
- Culture of Canada
