= Coke Zoo =

Mixtape by French Montana and Fetty Wap
- Released: October 26, 2015
- Genre: Hip hop
- Length: 45:02
- Label: Coke Boys; RGF; Maybach Music; 300
- Producer: AK47; Bassivity; Eye Beat; Metro Boomin; Mike DZL; Mixx; NickEBeats; Peoples; Remo The Hitmaker; RGF Productions; The Mekanics; Yung Lan

French Montana chronology
Casino Life 2: Brown Bag Legend (2015)	Coke Zoo (2015)	Wave Gods (2016)

Fetty Wap chronology
Fetty Wap (2015)	Coke Zoo (2015)	For My Fans (2015)

Coke Zoo is a collaborative mixtape by American rappers French Montana and Fetty Wap. The mixtape was announced in early October and released on October 26, 2015, by Coke Boys, RGF, Maybach Music Group and 300 Entertainment. It features guest appearances from Chris Brown, Puff Daddy, Zoo Gang associates Monty and Nitt Da Gritt, and Coke Boy associates Lil Durk and Zack. Production derives from AK47, Bassivity, Eye Beat, Metro Boomin, Mike DZL, Mixx, NickEBeats, Peoples, Remo The Hitmaker, RGF Productions, The MeKanics and Yung Lan.

== Background ==
On October 9, French Montana's brother Cokeboy Zack appeared on Revolt TV announcing the release of the mixtape Coke Zoo, a collaboration between French Montana and Fetty Wap. On October 12, actress Sanaa Lathan, rumored to be dating French at the time, uploaded an early version of the mixtape cover on her Instagram, further confirming the upcoming release.

The two rappers had recently accompanied Chris Brown on his nationwide One Hell of a Nite Tour, alongside the likes of Migos, Omarion and August Alsina. During which, the two had recorded eight tracks together which culminated in the Coke Zoo mixtape, a play on French's "Coke Boys" and Fetty's "Zoo Gang" rap collectives, respectively. The record features five collaboration tracks between French Montana and Fetty Wap, in addition to two tracks from Fetty Wap, and another five tracks from French Montana.

== Critical reception ==
Sheldon Pearce of Pitchfork praised the chemistry between the two rappers but felt that "Many of the ideas and sounds on Coke Zoo feel like Fetty Wap B-sides and leftovers."

== Track listing ==
Coke Zoo track listing
No.	Title	Producer(s)	Length
1.	"First Time" (performed by French Montana featuring Puff Daddy)	AK47; The Mekanics	2:32
2.	"Power"	Peoples; NickEBeats	3:29
3.	"Freaky" (featuring Monty)	The MeKanics	5:25
4.	"Whip It" (featuring Zack)	Eye Beat; Metro Boomin	3:58
5.	"Last of the Real Ones" (performed by French Montana featuring Zack)	Mike DZL	5:50
6.	"Angel"	Yung Lan	4:18
7.	"Sometimes"	Peoples	2:51
8.	"Gangsta Way" (performed by French Montana featuring Chris Brown)	Remo the Hitmaker	3:42
9.	"Damn Chainz" (performed by Fetty Wap featuring Nitt da Gritt)	RGF Productions	3:45
10.	"Jamaican Trainer" (Skit)		0:42
11.	"My Squad" (performed by Fetty Wap)	RGF Productions	1:54
12.	"See Me" (performed by French Montana featuring Lil Durk)	Bassivity	3:58
13.	"Concentration" (performed by French Montana)	The Mekanics; Mixx	2:48
Total length:			45:12
