= Yeat discography =

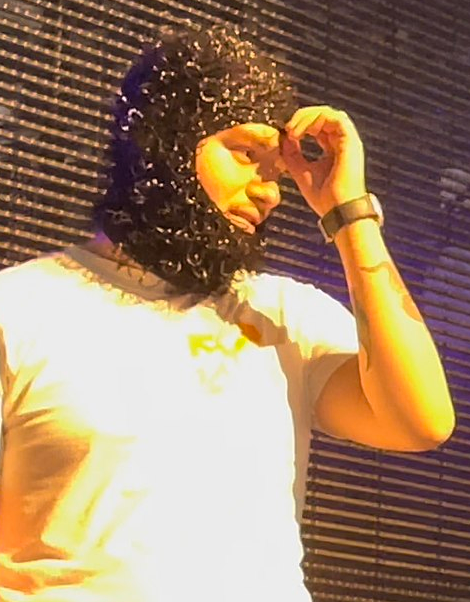
- Yeat in 2022
- Studio albums: 6
- EPs: 8
- Singles: 26
- Mixtapes: 5

The discography of American rapper Yeat consists of six studio albums, five mixtapes, eight extended plays, and 26 singles.

On September 20, 2018, Yeat released his debut extended play titled Deep Blue Strips. He released his debut mixtape titled Wake Up Call on January 9, 2019. He released his second extended play titled Different Creature on July 18, 2019. Yeat then released his second mixtape titled I'm So Me on January 3, 2020.

On April 18, 2020, Yeat self-released his third extended play titled We Us on April 18, 2020, only for digital downloading. He released his fourth extended play titled Hold On on September 11, 2020. Yeat then released his third mixtape titled Alive on April 2, 2021, through his new label, Twizzy Rich.

Yeat started gaining recognition when he released his fourth mixtape 4L on June 11, 2021, which included many songs that gained popularity on the social media app TikTok. He then released his debut studio album Up 2 Me on September 10, 2021, which also had tracks go viral on the platform. In the week of January 19, 2022, Up 2 Me debuted at number 183 on the Billboard 200, making it Yeat's first project to go on the chart. It later peaked at number 58.

He then released his second studio album and sequel to his April 2021 mixtape 2 Alive on February 18, 2022, through Geffen Records, Interscope Records, Field Trip Recordings, Listen to the Kids and Twizzy Rich, and peaked at number 6 on the Billboard 200.

On June 28, 2022, Yeat released a single titled "Rich Minion" that was used in a trailer for Minions: The Rise of Gru produced by Lyrical Lemonade. The song was later associated with the Gentleminions, a TikTok trend involving people dressed in formal attire to go watch the movie in theaters. The song also peaked at number 99 on the Billboard Hot 100, making it his second song to reach that chart, the first being "Money So Big", which debuted at number 95.

On September 2, 2022, Yeat released a single from his sixth extended play Lyfe titled "Talk". Lyfe was released a week later on September 9, 2022. His third studio album Afterlyfe was released on February 24, 2023. Yeat was featured on Canadian rapper and singer Drake's song "IDGAF" from his album For All the Dogs, which debuted at number two on the Billboard Hot 100 and number one on the Global 200, making it Yeat's most highest-performing song.

2093 was released on February 16, 2024, featuring American rappers Lil Wayne and Future, while the P2 deluxe edition adds another feature from Drake. On May 3, 2024, Yeat released two singles, "King tonka", "Heavy Stunts" featuring rapper Don Toliver. On October 18, 2024, Yeat released the studio album Lyfestyle, which debuted at number one on the Billboard 200, marking his first number-one album of his career.

In March 2025, Pitchfork confirmed in an article that Yeat and Don Toliver would be releasing a collaborative album in 2025, alongside headlining the Summer Smash 2025 festival together on June 20, 2025, the statement regarding the album was later removed from the article.

On March 27, 2026, Yeat released his sixth studio album ADL, with several features including songs with Kylie Jenner, NBA YoungBoy and Julia Wolf. It debuted at number five on the Billboard 200.

== Studio albums ==
List of studio albums, with selected chart positions
Title	Album details	Peak chart positions										Sales (Note: Sales figures for albums, EPs, and singles are pure sales that do not take equivalent units into account.)	Certifications
Title	Album details	US	US R&B/HH	AUS	CAN	DEN	NLD	GER	IRE	NZ	UK	Sales	Certifications
Up 2 Me	Released: September 10, 2021; Labels: Interscope, Foundation, Twizzy Rich; Formats: LP, CD, digital download, streaming	58	31	—	81	—	—	—	—	—	—		
2 Alive	Released: February 18, 2022; Labels: Geffen, Interscope, Field Trip, Listen to the Kids, Twizzy Rich; Formats: LP, digital download, streaming	6	3	—	19	—	—	—	—	—	—		RIAA: Gold; ZPAV: Gold
Afterlyfe	Released: February 24, 2023; Label: Twizzy Rich, Geffen, Field Trip; Format: LP, digital download, streaming	4	2	58	5	—	37	49	25	17	20		ZPAV: Gold
2093	Released: February 16, 2024; Label: Capitol, Field Trip, Lyfestyle Corporation; Format: LP, digital download, streaming	2	2	49	5	23	18	23	23	14	24	US: 12,000	
Lyfestyle	Released: October 18, 2024; Label: Capitol, Field Trip, Lyfestyle Corporation; Format: LP, CD, digital download, streaming	1	1	46	13	—	47	59	66	29	52	US: 60,000	
ADL	Released: March 27, 2026; Label: Capitol, Field Trip, Lyfestyle Corporation; Format: LP, CD, digital download, streaming	5	2	29	21	—	36	47	—	21	86	US: 26,000	
"—" denotes a recording that did not chart or was not released in that territory.

== Mixtapes ==
List of mixtapes, with selected details
Title	Mixtape details	Peak chart positions		
Title	Mixtape details	US	AUS	CAN
Wake Up Call	Released: January 9, 2019; Label: StreamCut; Format: Digital download, streaming	—	—	—
I'm So Me	Released: January 3, 2020; Label: Mega Millions; Format: Digital download, streaming	—	—	—
Alive	Released: April 2, 2021; Label: Twizzy Rich; Format: Digital download, streaming	—	—	—
4L	Released: June 10, 2021; Label: Twizzy Rich; Format: Digital download, streaming	—	—	—
Luh Leakyz Vol. 1	Released: October 23, 2026; Label: Capitol, Field Trip, Lyfestyle Corporation; Format: LP, CD, digital download, streaming	39	64	86

== Extended plays ==
List of extended plays, with selected chart positions and certifications
Title	EP details	Peak chart positions			Certifications
Title	EP details	US	CAN	NZ	Certifications
Deep Blue Strips	Released: September 20, 2018; Label: StreamCut; Format: Digital download, streaming	—	—	—	
Different Creature	Released: July 18, 2019; Label: StreamCut; Format: Digital download, streaming	—	—	—	
We Us	Released: April 18, 2020; Label: Self-released; Format: Digital download, streaming	—	—	—	
Hold On	Released: September 11, 2020; Label: Self-released; Format: Digital download, streaming	—	—	—	
Trendi	Released: August 5, 2021; Label: Twizzy Rich; Format: Digital download, streaming	—	—	—	
Lyfe	Released: September 9, 2022; Label: Twizzy Rich, Geffen, Field Trip; Format: LP, digital download, streaming	10	24	36	RIAA: Gold; MC: Gold; ZPAV: Gold
Dangerous Summer	Released: August 1, 2025; Label: Lyfestyle, Field Trip, Capitol; Format: CD, digital download, streaming	9	65	27	
Cocoon	Released: September 18, 2026; Label: Lyfestyle, Field Trip, Capitol; Format: Streaming	88	96	40	
"—" denotes a recording that did not chart or was not released in that territory.

== Singles ==
List of singles as lead artist, showing year released and album name
Title	Year	Peak chart positions				Certifications	Album
Title	Year	US	CAN	NZ Hot	WW	Certifications	Album
"Loot" (featuring Jban$2Turnt)	2018	—	—	—	—		Non-album singles
"Rockin It"	2018	—	—	—	—		Non-album singles
"Big Geek Week"	2019	—	—	—	—		Non-album singles
"Number 1"	2019	—	—	—	—		Non-album singles
"Money Move" (featuring Nessly)	2019	—	—	—	—		Non-album singles
"Not the Same"	2019	—	—	—	—		Non-album singles
"G550" (with Splashwoe)	2019	—	—	—	—		Non-album singles
"Flashey"	2020	—	—	—	—		Non-album singles
"Cali"	2021	—	—	—	—		Non-album singles
"Get Busy"	2021	—	—	—	—	RIAA: Gold	Up 2 Me
"Still Countin"	2022	—	—	26	—		2 Alive
"Rich Minion"	2022	99	94	30	—		Non-album single
"Talk"	2022	42	55	3	85	RIAA: Platinum; MC: Platinum; ZPAV: Gold	Lyfe
"Already Rich"	2023	—	—	—	—	RIAA: Gold; ZPAV: Gold	Non-album singles
"My Wrist" (with Young Thug)	2023	— (Note: "My Wrist" did not enter the Billboard Hot 100, but peaked at number six on the Bubbling Under Hot 100 Singles chart.)	—	8	—	RIAA: Gold	Non-album singles
"Bigger Then Everything"	2023	— (Note: "Bigger Then Everything" did not enter the Billboard Hot 100, but peaked at number seven on the Bubbling Under Hot 100 Singles chart.)	—	16	—		Non-album singles
"King Tonka"	2024	—	—	25	—		Non-album singles
"Go Again" (with Bnyx featuring Superheaven)	2024	—	—	33	—		Non-album singles
"5Brazy" (featuring Quavo)	2024	—	—	—	—		Non-album singles
"The Bell"	2025	— (Note: "The Bell" did not enter the Billboard Hot 100, but peaked at number five on the Bubbling Under Hot 100 Singles chart.)	—	9	—		Non-album singles
"Feel No Wayz (Yeat Mix)"	2025	—	—	39	—		Non-album singles
"Im Yeat" (with Bnyx)	2025	—	—	21	—		Non-album singles
"Dog House" (with Drake and Julia Wolf)	2025	53	39	14	116		Non-album singles
"New Trip" (Quavo featuring Yeat and Bnyx)	2025	—	—	31	—		TBA
"Made It on Our Own" (with EsDeeKid)	2026	— (Note: "Made It on Our Own" did not enter the Billboard Hot 100, but peaked at number 14 on the Bubbling Under Hot 100 chart.)	92	10	—		Non-album single
"Let King Tonka Talk" (with King Kylie)	2026	—	—	22	—		ADL
"Million Dollar Minion"	2026	—	—	—	—		Non-album singles
"On Nothing"	2026	—	—	15	—		Non-album singles
"—" denotes a recording that did not chart or was not released in that territory.

== Other charted and certified songs ==
List of other charted songs, with selected chart positions
Title	Year	Peak chart positions										Certifications	Album
Title	Year	US	US R&B /HH	CAN	LAT Stream.	LTU	NZ	NZ Hot	SWI	UK	WW	Certifications	Album
"Sorry Bout That"	2021	—	—	—	—	—	—	—	—	—	—	RIAA: Gold	4L
"Turban"	2021	—	—	—	—	—	—	—	—	—	—	RIAA: Gold	Up 2 Me
"Money So Big"	2021	95	31	88	—	—	—	—	—	—	—	RIAA: Platinum; BPI: Silver; RMNZ: Gold	Up 2 Me
"Poppin"	2022	91	35	—	—	—	—	17	—	—	—	RIAA: Platinum	2 Alive
"Outside" (featuring Young Thug)	2022	— (Note: "Outside" did not enter the Billboard Hot 100, but peaked at number 16 on the Bubbling Under Hot 100 Singles chart.)	—	—	—	—	—	—	—	—	—		2 Alive
"Rackz Got Me" (featuring Gunna)	2022	— (Note: "Rackz Got Me" did not enter the Billboard Hot 100, but peaked at number seven on the Bubbling Under Hot 100 Singles chart.)	44	—	—	—	—	38	—	—	—	RIAA: Gold	2 Alive
"On Tha Line"	2022	—	—	—	—	—	—	—	—	—	—	RIAA: Gold	2 Alive
"Big Tonka" (featuring Lil Uzi Vert)	2022	— (Note: "Big Tonka" did not enter the Billboard Hot 100, but peaked at number five on the Bubbling Under Hot 100 Singles chart.)	44	—	—	—	—	30	—	—	—		2 Alive
"3G" (featuring Lil Uzi Vert)	2022	— (Note: "3G" did not enter the Billboard Hot 100, but peaked at number eight on the Bubbling Under Hot 100 Singles chart.)	47	—	—	—	—	—	—	—	—		2 Alive
"Flawless" (featuring Lil Uzi Vert)	2022	77	24	94	—	—	—	18	—	—	—	RIAA: Platinum; ZPAV: Gold	Lyfe
"Out the Way"	2022	— (Note: "Out the Way" did not enter the Billboard Hot 100, but peaked at number one on the Bubbling Under Hot 100 Singles chart.)	36	73	—	—	—	25	—	—	—	RIAA: Platinum; BPI: Silver; MC: Platinum; RMNZ: Gold; ZPAV: Gold	Lyfe
"No More Talk"	2023	77	27	81	—	29	—	17	—	—	—		Afterlyfe
"Shmunk" (featuring YoungBoy Never Broke Again)	2023	83	29	100	—	—	—	27	—	—	—		Afterlyfe
"Bettr Off"	2023	— (Note: "Bettr Off" did not enter the Billboard Hot 100, but peaked at number two on the Bubbling Under Hot 100 Singles chart.)	34	—	—	—	—	—	—	—	—	ZPAV: Gold	Afterlyfe
"Nun I'd Change"	2023	— (Note: "Nun I'd Change" did not enter the Billboard Hot 100, but peaked at number 23 on the Bubbling Under Hot 100 Singles chart.)	—	—	12	20	—	29	—	—	—		Afterlyfe
"How It Go"	2023	— (Note: "How It Go" did not enter the Billboard Hot 100, but peaked at number three on the Bubbling Under Hot 100 Singles chart.)	39	—	—	58	—	—	—	—	—		Afterlyfe
"Split"	2023	79	28	97	20	43	—	23	—	—	—		Afterlyfe
"IDGAF" (Drake featuring Yeat)	2023	2	2	1	—	6	6	—	6	5	1	ARIA: Gold; BPI: Silver; RMNZ: Gold; ZPAV: Gold	For All the Dogs
"Psycho CEO"	2024	89	37	79	—	—	—	12	—	—	—		2093
"Power Trip"	2024	— (Note: "Power Trip" did not enter the Billboard Hot 100, but peaked at number 12 on the Bubbling Under Hot 100 chart.)	—	—	—	—	—	18	—	—	—		2093
"Breathe"	2024	42	13	36	5	—	—	4	—	81	82	RIAA: Gold; RMNZ: Gold	2093
"More"	2024	— (Note: "More" did not enter the Billboard Hot 100, but peaked at number 21 on the Bubbling Under Hot 100 chart.)	—	—	—	—	—	—	—	—	—		2093
"Nothing Change"	2024	— (Note: "Nothing Change" did not enter the Billboard Hot 100, but peaked at number 18 on the Bubbling Under Hot 100 chart.)	—	—	—	—	—	—	—	—	—		2093
"Lyfestyle" (with Lil Wayne)	2024	— (Note: "Lyfestyle" did not enter the Billboard Hot 100, but peaked at number seven on the Bubbling Under Hot 100 chart.)	47	—	—	—	—	—	—	—	—		2093
"ILUV"	2024	— (Note: "ILUV" did not enter the Billboard Hot 100, but peaked at number 11 on the Bubbling Under Hot 100 chart.)	—	—	—	—	—	17	—	—	—		2093
"Stand on It" (with Future)	2024	— (Note: "Stand on It" did not enter the Billboard Hot 100, but peaked at number one on the Bubbling Under Hot 100 chart.)	42	91	—	—	—	—	—	—	—		2093
"If We Being Real"	2024	— (Note: "If We Being Real" did not enter the Billboard Hot 100, but peaked at number two on the Bubbling Under Hot 100 chart.)	29	57	—	63	—	29	85	63	163	RIAA: Gold; BPI: Silver; RMNZ: Gold; ZPAV: Gold	2093
"Heavy Stunts" (with Don Toliver)	2024	—	47	—	—	—	—	21	—	—	—		Non-album single
"Geek Time"	2024	—	—	—	—	—	—	19	—	—	—		Lyfestyle
"STFU"	2024	—	—	—	—	—	—	20	—	—	—		Lyfestyle
"Orchestrate"	2024	—	—	—	—	—	—	32	—	—	—		Lyfestyle
"Be Quiet" (with Kodak Black)	2024	—	—	—	—	—	—	26	—	—	—		Lyfestyle
"Put It Ong"	2025	— (Note: "Put It Ong" did not enter the Billboard Hot 100, but peaked at number 13 on the Bubbling Under Hot 100 chart.)	34	—	—	—	—	23	—	—	—		Dangerous Summer
"Loco"	2025	—	—	—	—	—	—	25	—	—	—		Dangerous Summer
"Come n Go"	2025	93	15	51	12	16	—	20	52	88	—	RIAA: Platinum; MC: Gold; RMNZ: Gold	Dangerous Summer
"2Tone" (with Don Toliver)	2025	—	—	—	—	—	—	24	—	—	—		Dangerous Summer
"Rendezvous" (Don Toliver featuring Yeat)	2026	30	10	40	—	—	—	—	—	—	49		Octane
"Purpose General"	2026	—	49	—	—	—	—	17	—	—	—		ADL
"Face the Flame" (with YoungBoy Never Broke Again and Grimes)	2026	—	—	—	—	—	—	31	—	—	—		ADL
"Lose Control" (with Elton John)	2026	— (Note: "Lose Control" did not enter the Billboard Hot 100, but peaked at number 23 on the Bubbling Under Hot 100 chart.)	—	—	—	—	—	22	—	—	—		ADL
"Griddle" (with Don Toliver)	2026	97	27	89	—	—	—	12	—	—	—		ADL
"Earned It"	2026	—	44	—	—	—	—	30	—	—	—		Cocoon
"Miss My Dawg" (featuring Drake)	2026	55	13	43	—	—	—	14	—	—	—		Cocoon
"Cocoon"	2026	—	—	—	—	—	—	40	—	—	—		Cocoon
"Lil Krazy"	2026	—	37	—	—	—	—	—	—	—	—		Luh Leakyz Vol. 1
"Time Passed"	2026	—	40	—	—	—	—	—	—	—	—		Luh Leakyz Vol. 1
"X with the Boot Up"	2026	—	47	—	—	—	—	—	—	—	—		Luh Leakyz Vol. 1
"Countup" (with Summrs)	2026	—	41	—	—	—	—	—	—	—	—		Luh Leakyz Vol. 1
"—" denotes a recording that did not chart or was not released in that territory.

== Guest appearances ==
List of non-single guest appearances, with other performing artists, showing year released and album name
Title	Year	Other performer(s)	Album
"Probably!"	2020	Autumn!	Solidarity
"Not da Same"	2021	Kankan	Rr
"Fuk da Clout"	2021	Kankan	Rr
"Cap to Me"	2021	UnoTheActivist	Unoverse 3
"Yam"	2021	sharkboy	UNDERWATER
"Pop Out"	2021	KillBunk	Non-album single
"Yeet"	2022	Yung Kayo	DFTK
"Lock It Up"	2022	Whethan, midwxst, Matt Ox	MIDNIGHT
"I Don't Text Back"	2022	YoungBoy Never Broke Again	Ma' I Got a Family
"Geeked Up"	2024	Don Toliver	Hardstone Psycho
"Crusin'"	2024	Childish Gambino	Bando Stone & The New World
"Work"	2025	Anyma	The End of Genesys
"Trip Out"	2025	Sheck Wes	JackBoys 2
"Switch It"	2025	BNYX, Zukenee	Loading...
"Rendezvous"	2026	Don Toliver	Octane
"Eaters"	2026	YSL Records, Young Thug, Travis Scott, Future, Tezzus	Slime Language 3
"Freezer"		Summrs	BADMAN
