= Already Rich =

Single by Yeat
- Released: May 3, 2023
- Recorded: 2021
- Label: Geffen; Capitol
- Songwriter: Noah Smith
- Producer: Noble

Yeat singles chronology
"Talk" (2022)	"Already Rich" (2023)	"My Wrist" (2023)

"Already Rich" (originally stylized as "Ard up") is a song written and performed by American rapper Yeat. Produced by Noble, it was released on May 3, 2023.

== Background ==
"Already Rich" was often referred to by the unofficial name "ard up", was originally leaked in 2021, and saw success on social media apps such as TikTok. The song was leaked during the summer of 2021, before the release of Yeat’s debut studio album Up 2 Me, and quickly gained popularity. The project was randomly released on May 3, 2023, this version of the song features an altered version of the intro.

The cover art comes from an Instagram story posted by Yeat on April 11, 2023. The song was later certified gold by the Recording Industry Association of America on December 11, 2024.

== Certifications and sales ==
Region	Certification	Certified units/sales
Poland (ZPAV)	Gold	25,000^{‡}
United States (RIAA)	Gold	500,000^{‡}
^{‡} Sales+streaming figures based on certification alone.
