= Nun I'd Change =

Single by Yeat

from the album Afterlyfe
- Released: February 24, 2023
- Genre: Darksynth
- Label: Field Trip; Listen to the Kids; Geffen; Interscope; Twizzy Rich
- Songwriter: Noah Smith
- Producers: BNYX; Colin Magdamo

Official Audio
- "Nun id change" on YouTube

"Nun I'd Change" (stylized as Nun id change) is a song written, produced, and performed by American singer, Yeat and was released alongside his third studio album, Afterlyfe on February 24, 2023. It was produced by Bnyx and Colin Magdamo.

== Background ==
"Nun id change” showcases Yeat taking on a darksynth house beat whilst talking about his wealth and how he feels when high. Before it found its spot as the fifth track on his album, AftërLyfe, Yeat would tease a portion of it on his Instagram account, alongside the tracklist.

== Critical reception ==
"Nun id change" deploys a "wavy" blend of "dance-house and hip-hop". The song has the vibe of Drake's Honestly, Nevermind. It serves as Yeat's [switch up] to the popularization of jersey club in the rap industry.

== Charts ==
Chart performance for "Nun I'd Change"
Chart (2023)	Peak position
Latvia Streaming (LAIPA)	12
Lithuania (AGATA)	20
New Zealand Hot Singles (RMNZ)	29
US Bubbling Under Hot 100 (Billboard)	23
