= 2093 (album) =

Studio album by Yeat
- Released: February 16, 2024
- Genres: Experimental hip-hop; rage; electro-industrial; industrial hip-hop; trap
- Length: 70:29
- Labels: Capitol; Field Trip; Lyfestyle
- Producers: Oscar Adler; AM; Bart How; Benny Bock; Bnyx; Bugz Ronin; Carlton; Charlie Coffeen; Dulio; Farsight; GeoGotBands; Teo Halm; Jasper Harris; Hitgirl; Keyon Christ; Ninetyniiine; Rio Leyva; LRBG; Rex Kudo; Tom Lev; OJ2Milly; Outtatown; Perdu; Radiate; Aaron Shadrow; Star Boy; Synthetic; UpMadeIt; Warpstr; WhoIce; Yeat; Zamorrah

Yeat chronology
Afterlyfe (2023)	2093 (2024)	Lyfestyle (2024)

2093 is the fourth studio album by American rapper Yeat, released on February 16, 2024, through Capitol Records, Field Trip Recordings and Lyfestyle Corporation. The album features guest appearances from Lil Wayne and Future, while the P2 deluxe edition adds another guest appearance from Drake. It serves as the follow-up to Afterlyfe (2023). The album received generally positive reviews and debuted at number two on Billboard 200, selling 70,000 album equivalent-units in its first week, marking as Yeat's second-highest charting album after his fifth studio album also released on the same year, Lyfestyle.

== Background ==
Following the release of Afterlyfe, Yeat would release the single "Bigger Then Everything", as well as be featured on Drake's song "IDGAF" in August and October 2023, respectively.

Yeat further described the theme of 2093 as a "dystopian society" and said that people would have no idea what it was "going to sound like". A teaser trailer for the album featured futuristic animations and revolves around the tale of a "corporate police state," inspired by Nineteen Eighty-Four (1984). Further album teases included pictures showing Yeat in Paris, recording with Donald Glover in a recording studio, as well as a FaceTime between him and Drake. Yeat also posted a snippet of a song with Future. On February 15, the rapper announced the album and shared the tracklist on Instagram.

On February 17, just a day after the album's original release, Yeat released 2093 (P2) with two additional tracks. On February 21, Yeat released 2093 (P3) with four additional tracks, however, the album was only made available to buy as a digital copy on his official website to boost overall sales.

== Critical reception ==
Professional ratings
Aggregate scores
Source	Rating
Metacritic	62/100
Review scores
Source	Rating
AllMusic	3/5 stars
HipHopDX	2.8/5
HotNewHipHop	4/5
Pitchfork	5.8/10
RapReviews	7/10
Slant Magazine	3.5/5 stars

2093 received positive reviews from music critics. On Metacritic, which assigns a normalized rating out of 100 to reviews from professional publications, the album received an average score of 62, based on six reviews, indicating "generally favorable reviews".

Reviewing the album for AllMusic, Paul Simpson wrote, "The ambitious and experimental 2093 is filled with lyrics about a corporate police state, sometimes delivered first-person in the guise of an evil CEO. There are moments of subtle humor, like when he buys the entire planet, then sells it seemingly without a second thought. Still, he sounds rather joyless as he's taking over the world, appearing to lament his wealth and power instead of flaunting it." In a review for Pitchfork, Alphonse Pierre remarked, "Yeat's older projects threw you into the deep end of his magma flows and fuzzy world-building and asked that you either get it or don't. An album this safe and familiar will be great for packing out bigger concert venues but only makes his musical identity more nebulous." In Slant Magazine, Paul Attard stated that, "Yeat remains the same single-minded alien that he was when he made Afterlyfe, and 2093 contains similar issues. Repetition is a big one, and not just in the sense of saying the same word over and over again——but in songs that, though they're certainly cutting edge when compared to what else is out there, begin to blur together over time. But while that prevents 2093 from sounding quite as forward-minded as its title suggests, Yeat is finally tapping into a style he can confidently call his own."

== Commercial performance ==
2093 debuted at number two on the US Billboard 200 chart, earning 70,000 album-equivalent units, including 12,000 pure sales. The album also accumulated a total of 79.15 million on-demand streams of the album's songs.

== Track listing ==
2093 track listing
No.	Title	Writer(s)	Producer(s)	Length
1.	"Psycho CEO"	Noah Smith; Abdul Moiz; George Kala	Dulio; GeoGotBands; OJ2Milly; WhoIce	3:45
2.	"Power Trip"	Smith; Jasper Harris; Aaron Shadrow; Arman Andican; Thomas Levesque; Oscar Adler	Yeat; Harris; Shadrow; AM; Tom Lev; Adler	4:24
3.	"Breathe"	Smith; Bart van Hoewijk; Anton Mendo	Bart How; Star Boy	2:50
4.	"More"	Smith; Daniel Perez; Javier Mercado	Bugz Ronin; Synthetic	2:45
5.	"Bought the Earth"	Smith; Rex Kudo; Carlton McDowell Jr.; Charlie Coffeen	Kudo; Carlton; Coffeen	2:58
6.	"Nothing Change"	Smith; Kala	Yeat; GeoGotBands	3:57
7.	"U Should Know"	Smith; Moiz	Dulio; Nelie	3:06
8.	"Lyfestyle" (with Lil Wayne)	Smith; Dwayne Carter Jr.; Mercado	Synthetic; Fendii; Aywhat	3:56
9.	"ILUV"	Smith; Mercado; Rio Leyva; Edith Frances; Ethan Kath	Yeat; Synthetic; Rio Leyva	3:03
10.	"Tell Me"	Smith; Mercado; Louis Esposito; Spencer Mott	Yeat; Synthetic; Perdu; Radiate; LRBG; Farsight	4:03
11.	"Shade"	Smith; Mercado; Esposito	Synthetic; Perdu; Ninetyniiine; UpMadeIt; Hitgirl; Key Christ; Zamorrahhh	4:02
12.	"Keep Pushin"	Smith; Moiz	Yeat; Dulio	2:46
13.	"Riot & Set It Off"	Smith	Yeat	2:38
14.	"Team CEO"	Smith; Tobias Dekker	Outtatown	3:17
15.	"2093"	Smith; Andican; Adler; Ethan Andrade	Yeat; AM; Adler; Warpstr	2:24
16.	"Stand on It" (with Future)	Smith; Naydavius Cash; Kala	GeoGotBands	3:00
17.	"Familia"	Smith; Benjamin Saint-Fort; Moiz	Bnyx; Dulio; Farsight	2:34
18.	"Mr. Inbetweenit"	Smith	Yeat; 730hahah; OMGZanoza	3:18
19.	"Psychocaine"	Smith; Moiz	Yeat; Dulio; OJ2Milly; WhoIce	2:46
20.	"Run They Mouth"	Smith; Kala	Yeat; GeoGotBands; WhoIce	3:26
21.	"If We Being Real"	Smith; Mercado; Esposito; Mott	Synthetic; Perdu; Radiate; Fendii; LRBG; Dreamr	2:52
22.	"1093"	Smith; Kudo; Benny Bock	Yeat; Rex Kudo; Bock	2:36
Total length:				70:29

Phase 2 deluxe edition additional track listing
No.	Title	Writer(s)	Producer(s)	Length
7.	"As We Speak" (featuring Drake)	Smith; Aubrey Graham; Mercado; Esposito; Mott; Aidan McDougall; Caleb Bryant; Gabriel St-Onge; Alexander Kanaev; Grachev Alexey	Yeat; Synthetic; Perdu; Radiate; Sharkboy; LRBG; Babymind; Bryant; McDougall	4:01
13.	"Never Quit"	Smith; Mendo; Aaron Shadrow; Teo Halm	Yeat; Star Boy; Shadrow; Halm	3:00

Phase 3 deluxe edition additional track listing
No.	Title	Writer(s)	Producer(s)	Length
25.	"Time Passed"	Smith; Mercado; Esposito; Mott	Synthetic; Perdu; Radiate; Fendii; Darkoivx	2:21
26.	"Oh My Pockets"	Smith; Kala	GeoGotBands	3:03
27.	"Sklub"	Smith; Pablo Sanchez	Dreamawake	3:15
28.	"H.A.B"	Smith; Sanchez	Dreamawake	2:26

Notes

- "More", "Nothing Change", "Lyfestyle", "Tell Me", "Psychocaine", "Run They Mouth", "If We Being Real", and "Oh My Pockets" have the last "e" in the title replaced with "ë". For example, "More" is stylized as "Morë". In addition, "Time Passed" is stylized as "Timë Passed".
- "Power Trip" contains background vocals from Childish Gambino.
- "Breathe" interpolates the Regular Show episode "Slam Dunk".
- "ILUV" samples "Fleece" by Crystal Castles.

== Charts ==
=== Weekly charts ===
Weekly chart performance for 2093
Chart (2024)	Peak position
Australian Albums (ARIA)	49
Australian Hip Hop/R&B Albums (ARIA)	12
Austrian Albums (Ö3 Austria)	4
Belgian Albums (Ultratop Flanders)	65
Belgian Albums (Ultratop Wallonia)	56
Canadian Albums (Billboard)	5
Danish Albums (Hitlisten)	23
Dutch Albums (Album Top 100)	18
Finnish Albums (Suomen virallinen lista)	45
German Albums (Offizielle Top 100)	23
Hungarian Albums (MAHASZ)	6
Irish Albums (Official Charts)	23
Italian Albums (FIMI)	90
Lithuanian Albums (AGATA)	5
New Zealand Albums (RMNZ)	14
Norwegian Albums (VG-lista)	12
Polish Albums (ZPAV)	12
Portuguese Albums (AFP)	12
Swiss Albums (Schweizer Hitparade)	5
UK Albums (Official Charts)	24
US Billboard 200	2
US Top R&B/Hip-Hop Albums (Billboard)	2

=== Year-end charts ===
Year-end chart performance for 2093
Chart (2024)	Position
US Top R&B/Hip-Hop Albums (Billboard)	60

== Certifications ==
Certifications for 2093
Region	Certification	Certified units/sales
Poland (ZPAV)	Gold	10,000^{‡}
^{‡} Sales+streaming figures based on certification alone.
