= I'm Yeat =

Single by Yeat and Bnyx

from the EP Dangerous Summer
- Released: July 18, 2025
- Length: 2:49
- Label: Lyfestyle; Field Trip; Capitol
- Producers: Bnyx; Sapjer

Yeat singles chronology
"The Bell" (2025)	"I'm Yeat" (2025)	"Dog House" (2025)

"I'm Yeat" (stylized as "Im Yeat" in all caps) is a song written and performed by American rapper Yeat and American producer Bnyx. Co-written and co-produced by Sapjer, it was released on July 18, 2025, as the lead single from the former's seventh extended play Dangerous Summer (2025).

== Background ==
The snippet of "I'm Yeat" was played at the Beach, Please! Festival in Romania, in front of 122,000 people.

Following the release of "I'm Yeat," the announcement for the release of Yeat's sixth extended play, Dangerous Summer was revealed in an Instagram post. The song's production was handled by Bnyx and Sapjer.

== Reception ==
Zachary Horvath of HotNewHipHop says the beat of the song has a "nightmarish" and "unearthly" feeling to it.

== Personnel ==
- Bnyx – producer, programmer, composer, lyricist
- Sapjer – producer, composer, lyricist
- Yeat – composer, lyricist
- Patrick Rosario – mastering, mixing, recording engineer

== Charts ==
Chart performance for "I'm Yeat"
Chart (2025)	Peak position
New Zealand Hot Singles (RMNZ)	21
