= Psycho CEO =

2024 song by Yeat

Song by Yeat

from the album 2093
- Released: February 16, 2024
- Genre: Experimental hip-hop
- Length: 3:45
- Label: Capitol; Field Trip; Lyfestyle Corporation
- Songwriters: Noah Smith; Abdul Moiz; George Kala
- Producers: Dulio; GeoGotBands; OJ2Milly; WhoIce

"Psycho CEO" is a song by American rapper Yeat from his fourth studio album 2093 (2024). It was produced by Dulio, GeoGotBands, OJ2Milly and WhoIce.

== Background and composition ==
The title of the song refers to an alter-ego of Yeat which he introduces. The song uses "banging drums" and "harmonies that interact with each other such that it sounds like five different Yeats having conversations beneath the main vocal line." Yeat also raps, "I'ma cut you off, cut you off when you talkin' to me".

== Critical reception ==
Will Schube of HipHopDX called the song a "monk-ish chat" and described the music as "nuts", additionally writing "Even the way his delivery shifts from line to line and the way he employs different flows is enticing. He has a great idea tucked in the first full verse. 'I just poured a planet in my IV bag,' he spits, delivering the sort of evocative and goofy line that's made Yeat so endearing. But he then follows it up with a total dud: 'You ain't go no money, it's obviously sad.'" Alphonse Pierre of Pitchfork commented, "Plenty of rappers have tagged themselves the boss, head honcho, or even CEO, but every time Yeat mentions the 'Psycho CEO,' I can only think of how incredibly corny it is, like asking Elon Musk to host SNL."

== Charts ==
Chart performance for "Psycho CEO"
Chart (2024)	Peak position
Canada (Canadian Hot 100)	79
New Zealand Hot Singles (RMNZ)	12
US Billboard Hot 100	89
US Hot R&B/Hip-Hop Songs (Billboard)	37
