= The Bell (Yeat song) =

2025 single by Yeat

Single by Yeat
- Released: April 18, 2025
- Length: 2:44
- Label: Lyfestyle; Field Trip; Capitol
- Songwriters: Noah Smith; Javier Mercado; Primo Pepper; Cai Burns; Cat Burns
- Producers: Synthetic; Primo; Cai Burns; Cat Burns

Yeat singles chronology
"Work" (2025)	"The Bell" (2025)	"Feel No Wayz (Yeat Mix)" (2025)

Music video
- "The Bell" on YouTube

"The Bell" is a song by American rapper Yeat. He premiered the song during his performance at Coachella, before releasing it a week later on April 18, 2025. It was produced by Synthetic, Primo, Cai Burns and Cat Burns.

== Background ==
Yeat debuted the song live at the Weekend 1 set of Coachella. He performed it in front of a 50-foot golden bell placed at the center of the stage, paying homage to his song "Get Busy".

== Composition ==
The production contains "deep, rumbling basslines" and "sharp, echoing chimes that mimic a tolling bell". In the lyrics, Yeat revolves around his success, sense of detachment from others, and creating his own identity. He also uses offbeat ad-libs.

== Music video ==
The music video was released alongside the single. It depicts how Yeat's Coachella performance was organized.

== Charts ==
Chart performance for "The Bell"
Chart (2025)	Peak position
New Zealand Hot Singles (RMNZ)	9
US Bubbling Under Hot 100 (Billboard)	5
