= Rackz Got Me =

"Rackz Got Më"

Single by Yeat and Gunna

from the album 2 Alivë
- Released: February 17, 2022
- Songwriters: Noah Smith; Fyodor Viktorovich; Sergio Kitchens; Jammarius Hill
- Producers: Trgc; Takado

Official Audio
- "Rackz Got Më" on YouTube

"Rackz Got Me" (stylized as Rackz Got Më) is a song written, produced, and performed by American singer, Yeat featuring Gunna and was released alongside 2 Alivë on February 18, 2022.

== Background ==
"Rackz Got Më" is a song off Yeat's 2 Alivë featuring fellow rapper Gunna. A snippet of this track was previewed by Yeat on Instagram Live on February 7, 2022, on which a vast majority of the track was played. On the track, Yeat capitalizes on the sound that blew him to fame, utilizing his signature bell sound effect on the 808s. This song leaked along with the rest of the project on February 16, 2022. On July 13, 2024, "Rackz Got Më" was certified gold by the Recording Industry Association of America.

== Charts ==
Chart	Peak position
New Zealand Hot Singles (RMNZ)	38
US Bubbling Under Hot 100 (Billboard)	7
US Hot R&B/Hip-Hop Songs (Billboard)	44

== Certifications and sales ==
Region	Certification	Certified units/sales
United States (RIAA)	Gold	500,000^{‡}
^{‡} Sales+streaming figures based on certification alone.
