= Stand on It (Yeat song) =

2024 song by Yeat featuring Future

Song by Yeat featuring Future

from the album 2093
- Released: February 16, 2024
- Length: 3:00
- Label: Capitol; Field Trip; Lyfestyle Corporation
- Songwriters: Noah Smith; Naydavius Cash; George Kala
- Producer: GeoGotBands

"Stand on It" is a song by American rapper Yeat featuring fellow American rapper Future, written alongside producer GeoGotBands for the former's fourth studio album 2093 (2024).

== Critical reception ==
Gabriel Bras Nevares of HotNewHipHop stated that Future's appearance is "mixed way too low, but he does his thing" and the song "feel[s] repetitive". Jeff Ihaza of Rolling Stone described Future's guest verse as "half-hearted" but wrote that it "still manage[s] to feel jarring in contrast with the general emptiness of Yeat's content." Reviewing 2093 for RapReviews, Steve "Flash" Juon commented the album "spends so much time being too cool for the room that guest stars like Future on the GeoGotBands produced 'Stand On It' really aren't necessary. Perhaps his own lyrics aren't either? 'Sit, like a mutt, yeah yeah, sit, you a bitch.' 'You can suck my dick, I don't give no fuck about this shit.' It's pretty obviously a trope for Yeat at this point that he wants you to know he doesn't care at all. He could have just looped Big Sean saying "I don't, give a, fuck about you or anything that you do."

== Charts ==
Chart performance for "Stand on It"
Chart (2024)	Peak position
Canada (Canadian Hot 100)	91
US Bubbling Under Hot 100 Singles (Billboard)	1
US Hot R&B/Hip-Hop Songs (Billboard)	42
