= ADL (album) =

2026 studio album by Yeat

Studio album by Yeat
- Released: March 27, 2026 (Note: While ADL was released on March 26 at 8:00 p.m. EDT, streaming services list March 27 as the release date. This article uses March 27 for consistency.)
- Genres: Hip-hop; pop rap; trap; rage
- Length: 62:01
- Labels: Lyfestyle; Field Trip; Capitol
- Producers: Bnyx; Sapjer; Gio Lacerna; Yeat; Lucid; Dulio; Vagosrose; Valhal; Prodbyflames; Madebyjarel; Ashe; Mathaius Young; Benny Henny; 206derek; Sonny Digital; Honorable C.N.O.T.E.; Cade; Kaaj; Bass; Smo; Lodoni; Dylan Brady; Daniel Chetrit; Shlohmo; Joe Stanley; Jonnywood; Jaasu; Rampa; Wondra; Malachiii; Steven Shaeffer; Synthetic; Empathy; Cade; Safari; Youngernextlife; Orin; Gleero; Cole YoursTruly

Yeat chronology
Dangerous Summer (2025)	ADL (2026)	Cocoon (2026)

Singles from ADL
- 1. "Let King Tonka Talk" Released: March 20, 2026

ADL is the sixth studio album by the American rapper Yeat. It was released through Lyfestyle Corporation, Field Trip Recordings, and Capitol Records on March 27, 2026. A double album, it consists of the discs A Dangerous Lyfe and A Dangerous Love. It features collaborations with Don Toliver, Elton John, YoungBoy Never Broke Again, Kid Cudi, Grimes, Julia Wolf, Kylie Jenner (under her alter-ego King Kylie), Swizz Beatz, Joji, and 070 Shake. Production was handled by Dylan Brady, Bnyx, Rampa, Synthetic, Lucid, and Sapjer, among others. It was supported by the single "Let King Tonka Talk".

== Background ==
Development on ADL began during the production of Yeat's fifth album, Lyfestyle. In an October 2024 interview with The Fader, the producer Synthetic described the emerging sound of ADL as a more refined version of 2093, Yeat's fourth album; Synthetic also estimated that ADL would take "three or four months to a year" to be completed. In July 2025, Yeat announced Dangerous Summer, an extended play that serves as a precursor to the album. On July 26, 2025, producer Bnyx confirmed that Dangerous Summer would be its own separate project from ADL. The EP was released on August 1, 2025. Three days before the album’s release, Yeat would showcase the album’s feature list on a page panel from the New York Times newspaper.

== Recording and production ==
In an October 2025 interview with Complex, Yeat characterized his approach to ADL as "polished and meticulous", a departure from the rapid pace of production he had become accustomed to over the course of his career. He explained that during the making of his EP Dangerous Summer, he began to revisit songs after recording sessions, something he would rarely do in the past. He credited this shift to sobriety, the end of a relationship, and a conversation with his manager, Zack Bia.

While working on ADL, Yeat left his house more often and found inspiration while traveling through Europe and Japan. In Saint-Tropez, France, he rented villas for himself, the producers Bnyx and Sapjer, and an engineer so that they could work in tandem. During production, Yeat would also listen to the ambient music of artists like Jon Hassell to identify potential samples.

== Critical reception ==
Professional ratings
Aggregate scores
Source	Rating
Metacritic	54/100
Review scores
Source	Rating
AllMusic	2.5/5 stars
Clash	5/10
The Needle Drop	3/10
RapReviews	6.5/10
Rolling Stone	3/5 stars
Slant Magazine	1.5/5 stars

According to the review aggregator Metacritic, ADL received "mixed or average reviews" based on a weighted average score of 54 out of 100 from 5 critic scores. In a mixed review, Clash found ADL bloated and, at times, aimless. Pointing to the list of collaborators, which ranges from YoungBoy Never Broke Again to Elton John, they write that both discs lack a coherent identity, likening them to "a widescreen blockbuster that is big on stunning vistas, and short on plot". While complementing Yeat's "wholly distinctive ... slick, effects-laden flows" on songs like "Griddle", "2Nite", "Lose Control", "No More Ghosts", and "Real Life Shit", they also highlight "Liv Like Dis", "Silk Face", and "Geek Luv" as examples of excess holding the album back for all but the most dedicated fans.

Paul Attard for Slant stated that the album "sacrifices something central: the zany, off-kilter personality that once defined both Yeat and his music." Anthony Fantano wrote how bloated the project was, stating how the album sees lack personality, and how ADL sees Yeat trying to fit in the conformities of Kanye West.

Mosi Reeves of Rolling Stone gave the album decent praise, writing how he sees Yeat evolving from the chaotic, punk-influenced energy of his earlier work toward a clearer, more mainstream sound; however, the results are very mixed. Reeves appreciates the enunciation of Yeat's vocals, as well as the melodic velocity he is putting out, delving away from the over-saturation of the rage rap style. While Reeves did praise some of the tracks and enjoyed Yeat's high energy and claimed that his vocal tone is his strongest asset, he did criticize Yeat's limited range in terms of lyrical depth. All in all, he wrote how the album saw Yeat evolve, but his maturation as an artist remained incomplete.

== Commercial performance ==
Yeat's ADL debuted at number five on the Billboard 200, with 57,000 album-equivalent units, making it his seventh top-ten placement on the chart following the release of Dangerous Summer, which debuted at number 9.

== Track listing ==
Disc one – A Dangerous Lyfe
No.	Title	Writer(s)	Producer(s)	Length
1.	"Purpose General"	Noah Smith; Benjamin Saint-Fort; Alexis-Giovani Lacerna; Jasper Levering	Bnyx; Gio Lacerna; Sapjer	3:25
2.	"Face the Flame" (with YoungBoy Never Broke Again and Grimes)	Smith; Kentrell Gaulden; Claire Boucher; Saint-Fort; Abdul Moois; Abdullah Hussein; Lucien Dunne; Yaroslav Sazhin; Artem Murashov; Elijah Milinin	Yeat; Bnyx; Dulio; Lucid; Prodbyflames; Vagosrose; Valhal; Madebyjarel	3:44
3.	"Lose Control" (with Elton John)	Smith; Elton John; Dunne	Lucid	2:39
4.	"Griddle" (with Don Toliver)	Smith; Caleb Toliver; Saint-Fort; Derek Anderson; Asher Meadows; Joshua Ayers	Bnyx; 206Derek; Ashe; Benny Henny; Mathaius Young	2:37
5.	"What I Want" (with Bnyx)	Smith; Saint-Fort	Bnyx	2:39
6.	"Liv Like Dis"	Smith; Levering; Dunne; Carlton Mays Jr.; Sonny Uwaezuoke	Sapjer; Lucid; Honorable C.N.O.T.E.; Sonny Digital	2:41
7.	"Taller"	Smith; Saint-Fort; Cade Blodgett; Kaj Dellensen; Sebastiaan Bink	Bnyx; Cade; Kaaj; Bass	2:48
8.	"My Way" (with Julia Wolf)	Smith; Julia Capello; Saint-Fort; Levering; Dunne; Ismo Kari; Lorenzo Spadoni	Bnyx; Sapjer; Lucid; Smo; Iodoni	3:12
9.	"Let King Tonka Talk" (with King Kylie)	Smith; Kylie Jenner; Dunne; Daniel Chetrit; Dylan Brady	Lucid; Chetrit; Brady	3:01
10.	"Dangerous House"	Smith; Levering; Henry Laufer	Sapjer; Shlohmo	3:52
11.	"No More Ghosts" (with Kid Cudi)	Smith; Scott Mescudi; Dunne; Joe Stanley; Che Maddix	Lucid; Stanley	2:50
Total length:				33:28

Disc two – A Dangerous Love
No.	Title	Writer(s)	Producer(s)	Length
1.	"2Nite"	Smith; Saint-Fort; Dunne	Bnyx; Lucid	2:45
2.	"Geek Luv"	Smith; Jaasu Mallory; Jonathan Birkner	Yeat; Jaasu; Jonnywood	2:28
3.	"Naked"	Smith; Gregor Sütterlin; Malachi Cohen; Philip Böllhoff	Yeat; Rampa; Malachii; Wondra030	1:33
4.	"Went Wrong" (with 070 Shake)	Smith; Danielle Balbuena; Dunne; Dave Hamelin	Lucid	3:36
5.	"Real Life Shit"	Smith; Levering	Sapjer	3:12
6.	"My Time" (with Swizz Beatz)	Smith; Kasseem Dean; Levering; Steven Shaeffer	Sapjer; Shaeffer	3:29
7.	"2Planes"	Smith; Dunne; Juan Alvarado; Javier Mercado	Lucid; Empathy; Synthetic	2:07
8.	"Silk Face"	Smith; Blodgett; Ansel Montgomery; Martin Samoska; Michael Price	Cade; Youngernextlife; Safari	2:32
9.	"Back Home" (with Joji)	Smith; George Miller; Dunne; Mercado; Orin Friedman; Stephan Sergeevich	Lucid; Synthetic; Orin; Gleero	3:13
10.	"Up from Here"	Smith; Dunne; Cole Ostin; Talay Riley; Tyler Lewis	Lucid; Cole YoursTruly	3:38
Total length:				28:33

Notes

- "Face the Flame" is stylized as "Face the Flamë".
- "Live Like Dis" is stylized as "Liv Likë Dis".
- "Taller" is stylized as "Tallër".
- "2Planes" is stylized as "2Planës".
- "Silk Face" is stylized as "Silk Facë".
- "No More Ghosts" is stylized in all caps.

== Charts ==
Chart performance for ADL
Chart (2026)	Peak position
Australian Albums (ARIA)	29
Australian Hip Hop/R&B Albums (ARIA)	6
Austrian Albums (Ö3 Austria)	22
Belgian Albums (Ultratop Flanders)	105
Belgian Albums (Ultratop Wallonia)	182
Canadian Albums (Billboard)	21
Dutch Albums (Album Top 100)	36
German Albums (Offizielle Top 100)	47
Hungarian Albums (MAHASZ)	16
Lithuanian Albums (AGATA)	19
New Zealand Albums (RMNZ)	21
Norwegian Albums (IFPI Norge)	39
Polish Albums (ZPAV)	42
Portuguese Albums (AFP)	33
Swiss Albums (Schweizer Hitparade)	11
UK Albums (Official Charts)	86
US Billboard 200	5
US Top R&B/Hip-Hop Albums (Billboard)	2
