= On Nothing =

2026 diss track by Yeat

Single by Yeat
- Released: September 4, 2026
- Length: 2:03
- Label: Lyfestyle; Field Trip; Capitol
- Songwriters: Noah Smith; Lucius Lowe; Jacob Williams
- Producers: Luc1us; Cxsket

Yeat singles chronology
"Million Dollar Minion" (2026)	"On Nothing" (2026)

Music video
- "On Nothing" on YouTube

"On Nothing" (stylized in all caps) is a song written and performed by American rapper Yeat. Co-written and co-produced by Luc1us and Cxsket, it was released on September 4, 2026, and serves as a diss to Travis Scott.

== Background and release ==
Yeat first made an appearance on Travis Scott's compilation album JackBoys 2, where he was featured on the track "Trip Out" (stylized in all caps) with Sheck Wes. However he and Wes were both shortly removed off of streaming media due to unknown reasons. Then, on March 20, 2026, Yeat collaborated with Scott's ex-wife, Kylie Jenner, on the track "Let King Tonka Talk". Then, on August 28, 2026, Yeat made an appearance on Young Thug's compilation album Slime Language 3. However, shortly after, Yeat was removed, this came after the fact that someone off the song gave Thug an ultimatum, stating that either their verse get's dropped, or Thug cuts Yeat's, to which Thug sided with Scott and removed Yeat off the project. Following his removal, rumors online began spreading that Scott was offended by Yeat's collaborations with Jenner, which prompted at him removing him off JackBoys 2, and giving Thug the ultimatum. Upon the events, Yeat would speak on the situation via social media and would announce the track's release as well as its cover art, the track would ultimately release at noon of September 4, 2026, alongside its designated music video, which featured a cameo appearance from Summrs.

== Composition and lyricism ==
"On Nothing" comes in at a runtime of two minutes and three seconds. Yeat co-wrote the song with Luc1us and Cxsket, who handled the music production for the track. On the other hand, Yeat handled the engineering of the track, where he did both the mixing, and mastering for it. According to Quincy Dominic of Rating Games Music, the track features a "slippery" beat with "futuristic, almost mechanical production". Lyrically, Yeat has an "unpredictable flow", where on the track, it sees Yeat take jabs at Scott by mentioning his nickname La Flame, where he raps "I'ma put out that flame, it's fuckin' lame", in the chorus, and in a later verse, Yeat raps, "I don't fuck with Flame, not a lot to say, if I saw a candle, I'd shush it/What more could I say?"

== Critical reception ==
“On Nothing” generated mixed reviews by music journalists. According to Quincy Dominic of Rating Games Music, he wrote how "punchy" and "action-packed" Yeat's verse is, writing how he needs to see more escalation between Scott and Yeat. In his weekly roundup review for the week, Anthony Fantano of The Needle Drop slated how mediocre the track is, despite showing love to Yeat's work in the past, he stated how unmemorable the flow is, how mediocre the beat is, and how scuffed Yeat's vocal mix is. He ends the review by saying that the song doesn't fit the vibe of what Yeat's normally known for. According to Jeff Ihaza of Rolling Stone, he wrote that the track is a crude imitation of Travis Scott.

== Personnel ==
These credits are adapted from various music streaming services.

- Yeat (Noah Smith) – vocals, composition, recording, mixing, mastering
- Luc1us (Lucius Lowe) – composition, production, programming
- Jacob Williams – composition
- Cxsket – production, programming

== Charts ==
Chart performance for "On Nothing"
Chart (2026)	Peak position
New Zealand Hot Singles (RMNZ)	15
Romania (Billboard)	23
US Hot R&B/Hip-Hop Songs (Billboard)	43
