= Breathe (Yeat song) =

2024 song by Yeat

Song by Yeat

from the album 2093
- Released: February 16, 2024
- Genre: Rage; hip house; EDM trap
- Length: 2:50
- Label: Capitol; Field Trip; Lyfestyle Corporation
- Songwriters: Noah Smith; Bart van Hoewijk; Anton Mendo
- Producers: Bart How; Star Boy

"Breathe" is a song by American rapper Yeat, released on February 16, 2024, from his fourth studio album 2093 (2024). It was collaboratively produced by Dutch beatmakers Bart How and Star Boy.

== Composition ==
Music critics have described the song as having "more in common with EDM than rap", with rhythms of the type as well as dance music elements. The production uses a "deafening house bassline" and "breathy" ad-libs. The song also contains a sample from the animated sitcom Regular Show.

== Critical reception ==
Gabriel Bras Nevares of HotNewHipHop described the song an "absolute standout" from 2093. Steve "Flash" Juon of RapReviews wrote favorably of the sample, commenting "If Bart How and Star Boy were going to pick from any surreal cartoon that seems like it could be from an alternate sci-fi future (anthropomorphic animals, talking gumball machines, vaporous cloud girlfriends) they chose the right one."

== Charts ==
=== Weekly charts ===
Weekly chart performance for "Breathe"
| Chart (2024) | Peak position |
|---|---|
| Australia Hip Hop/R&B (ARIA) | 26 |
| Australia New Music Singles (ARIA) | 19 |
| Canada (Canadian Hot 100) | 36 |
| Global 200 (Billboard) | 82 |
| Ireland (IRMA) | 79 |
| Latvia Streaming (LAIPA) | 5 |
| Lithuania (AGATA) | 17 |
| New Zealand Hot Singles (RMNZ) | 4 |
| Poland (Polish Streaming Top 100) | 88 |
| UK Singles (Official Charts) | 81 |
| US Billboard Hot 100 | 42 |
| US Hot R&B/Hip-Hop Songs (Billboard) | 13 |

=== Year-end charts ===
2024 year-end chart performance for "Breathe"
| Chart (2024) | Position |
|---|---|
| US Hot R&B/Hip-Hop Songs (Billboard) | 73 |

== Certifications ==
Certifications for Breathe
| Region | Certification | Certified units/sales |
|---|---|---|
| New Zealand (RMNZ) | Gold | 15,000^{‡} |
| United States (RIAA) | Gold | 500,000^{‡} |
^{‡} Sales+streaming figures based on certification alone.
