= Made It on Our Own =

2026 single by Yeat and EsDeeKid

Single by Yeat and EsDeeKid
- Released: February 27, 2026
- Genre: Hip-hop
- Length: 2:49
- Label: Lyfestyle Corporation; Field Trip; Capitol Records
- Songwriters: EsDeeKid; Mathaius Young; Noah Smith; Lucien Dunne
- Producers: Lucid; Mathaius Young

Yeat singles chronology
| "Rendezvous" (2026) | "Made It on Our Own" (2026) | "Let King Tonka Talk" (2026) |

EsDeeKid singles chronology
| "Omens" (2026) | "Made It on Our Own" (2026) |

Music video
- "Made It on Our Own" on YouTube

"Made It on Our Own" is a single by American rapper Yeat and British rapper EsDeeKid. It was released on February 27, 2026, through Lyfestyle Corporation, Field Trip, and Capitol Records. It was intended for Yeat's album, ADL, however it did not make the final album.

== Background ==
Months before the tracks release, Yeat and EsDeeKid teased a possible collaboration. The song was produced by Lucid and Mathaius Young.

== Critical reception ==
"Made It On Our Own" received mixed reviews from music critics. Tom Breihan of Stereogum described the song as boring. Breihan stated that the song is depressing because "EsDeeKid does not sound good when he doesn't sound like he's rapping by candlelight in a leaky, unfinished basement." Tallie Spencer from HotNewHipHop stated that the production of the song "leans into atmospheric synths and knocking drums."

Writing for Ones to Watch, Jazmin Kylene highlighted that the two artists come from different parts of the world, their sounds still dance in perfect harmony on the song.

== Music video ==
The music video for "Made It on Our Own" was premiered a day before the song released. Directed by Director X, the music video was filmed at Drake's mansion in Toronto, known as The Embassy. The video features cameos from American music video director Cole Bennett, who is seen filming Yeat, and Chicago Bears quarterback Caleb Williams.

== Usage in media ==
The song was later added to the NBA 2K27 video game.

== Charts ==
Chart performance for "Made It on Our Own"
| Chart (2026) | Peak position |
|---|---|
| Australia Hip Hop/R&B (ARIA) | 25 |
| Canada (Canadian Hot 100) | 92 |
| New Zealand Hot Singles (RMNZ) | 10 |
| US Bubbling Under Hot 100 (Billboard) | 14 |
| US Hot R&B/Hip-Hop Songs (Billboard) | 39 |
