= If We Being Real =

2024 song by Yeat

Song by Yeat

from the album 2093
- Released: February 16, 2024
- Genre: Industrial hip-hop; Psychedelic rap
- Length: 2:52
- Label: Capitol; Field Trip; Lyfestyle Corporation
- Songwriters: Noah Smith; Javier Mercado; Louis Esposito; Spencer Mott; Joey Fenderson; Gabriel St-Onge; Eric Kjell Jowett
- Producers: Synthetic; Perdu; Radiate; Fendii; LRBG; Dreamr

"If We Being Real" (stylized as "If We Being Rëal") is a song by American rapper Yeat, released on February 16, 2024, from his fourth studio album 2093 (2024). It was produced by Synthetic, Perdu, Radiate, Fendii, LRBG and Dreamr.

== Critical reception ==
Reviewing 2093 for HotNewHipHop, Gabriel Bras Nevares cited "If We Being Real" as one of the tracks with "progressive, crunchy, well-structured, and thoroughly immersive beats".

== Virality ==
"If We Being Real" became viral on the social media platform TikTok. A slowed-down version of the song, described by Billboard as "ominous", saw widespread use as the background track in edits (video montages) of various real people and fictional characters, including King Baldwin IV from the film Kingdom of Heaven, Rafe Cameron from the Netflix series Outer Banks, and the basketball player Anthony Edwards. This virality contributed to an increase in streams in the United States: Between March 29 and April 4, 2024, the song received 1.92 million streams, whereas from April 26 to May 2 it exceeded 6 million. On October 16, 2026, the track was added as a Jam Track in the popular battle royale game Fortnite.

== Charts ==
Chart performance for "If We Being Real"
Chart (2024)	Peak position
Canada (Canadian Hot 100)	57
Global 200 (Billboard)	175
Lithuania (AGATA)	63
New Zealand Hot Singles (RMNZ)	29
US Bubbling Under Hot 100 Singles (Billboard)	2
US Hot R&B/Hip-Hop Songs (Billboard)	29

== Certifications ==
Certifications for "If We Being Real"
Region	Certification	Certified units/sales
Brazil (Pro-Música Brasil)	2× Platinum	80,000^{‡}
New Zealand (RMNZ)	Gold	15,000^{‡}
Poland (ZPAV)	Gold	25,000^{‡}
United Kingdom (BPI)	Silver	200,000^{‡}
United States (RIAA)	Gold	500,000^{‡}
^{‡} Sales+streaming figures based on certification alone.
