= Out the Way =

2022 song by Yeat

Song by Yeat

from the EP Lyfe
- Released: September 9, 2022
- Length: 2:30
- Label: Field Trip; Geffen; Twizzy Rich
- Songwriters: Noah Olivier Smith; Benjamin Debosnigs Saint Fort; Niles Terrell Groce
- Producers: Bnyx; Snapz

Music video
- "Out thë Way" on YouTube

"Out the Way" (stylized as "Out thë Way") is a song by American rapper Yeat from his sixth extended play Lyfe (2022). It was produced by Bnyx and Snapz.

== Composition and critical reception ==
The song finds Yeat rapping on an electric beat about his reckless behavior and drug use. He also demands for the release of the 28 YSL Records members that were arrested and charged with racketeering.

Kieran Press-Reynolds of Pitchfork described that in the song, "Yeat wrenches out dino burps and evil Peppa Pig honks over a beat so squiggly it's like he's in front of you doing a goofy little dance." Paul Attard of Slant Magazine noted Yeat's vocal inflections in the song as showing stylistic influences of Young Thug, Future and Playboi Carti "rather transparently", writing, "yet his approach isn't a cheap pastiche of these disparate styles."

== Charts ==
=== Weekly charts ===
Weekly chart performance for "Out the Way"
Chart (2022–2023)	Peak position
Canada (Canadian Hot 100)	73
Lithuania (AGATA)	86
New Zealand Hot Singles (RMNZ)	25
US Bubbling Under Hot 100	1
US Hot R&B/Hip-Hop Songs (Billboard)	36

=== Year-end charts ===
Year-end chart performance for "Out the Way"
Chart (2023)	Position
US Hot R&B/Hip-Hop Songs (Billboard)	90

== Certifications ==
Certifications for "Out the Way"
Region	Certification	Certified units/sales
Canada (Music Canada)	Platinum	80,000^{‡}
New Zealand (RMNZ)	Gold	15,000^{‡}
Poland (ZPAV)	Gold	25,000^{‡}
United Kingdom (BPI)	Silver	200,000^{‡}
United States (RIAA)	Platinum	1,000,000^{‡}
^{‡} Sales+streaming figures based on certification alone.
