= Mallory Merk =

American musician and model

- Born: Shreveport, Louisiana
- Origin: New York City
- Genres: Alternative R&B; Pop
- Occupations: Singer; songwriter; model
- Years active: 2016–present
- Labels: Warner; Field Trip
- Website: www.mallorymerk.com

Mallory Merk is an American singer, songwriter, and model. She began her career as a model, appearing in campaigns for Pat McGrath Labs and Fenty Beauty, among others. In 2016, she began releasing music and was signed to Warner Records in association with Field Trip Records in 2020. Her most recent collection, an EP entitled Thorns, was released in August 2022.

== Early life ==
Mallory Merk was born in Shreveport, Louisiana. She grew up in both Milford in Connecticut (with her mother) and Trenton, New Jersey (with her father). She began composing songs as early as age 12. Merk was also a competitive fencer as a child.

== Career ==
At age 14, Merk debuted as a model in a campaign for Yeezy Season 2. The following year, she met makeup artist Pat McGrath, and appeared in numerous campaigns for Pat McGrath Labs in the ensuing years. Merk also appeared as a model in several magazines and was featured in the first campaign for Fenty Beauty in 2017. While modeling, Merk also began releasing music. She gained some recognition after the release of a cover of Drake's "Marvins Room" in 2016. In August of that year, she released her first EP, MM & Hh. In 2017, Merk appeared on the song SAD SAD from RAT BOY’s album SCUM (Deluxe). She followed that in July 2018 with her second EP, 111 Reasons'. In 2019, she was signed to Zack Bia's new record label, Field Trip Recordings.j

In 2020, Merk debuted several new singles, including "Ghosts" and "Fresh Out". Her Strangers EP came out in October 2020 via Field Trip Recordings. In December 2020, Warner Records announced the signing of Merk in partnership with Field Trip. In February 2021, she released her first single with Warner entitled "Just Because". That song appeared on her major label debut EP, Counterparts, in August of that year. She followed that with the EP, Thorns, released in August 2022. Merk's cover of Jet's "Are You Gonna Be My Girl" appeared in the trailer for the Netflix series, Enola Holmes 2, in September 2022.

== Discography ==
=== EPs ===
List of EPs with selected details
Title	Details
MM & Hh	Scheduled release: August 2016 (US); Label: Self-released; Formats: Digital download
111 Reasons	Scheduled release: July 12, 2018 (US); Label: Self-released; Formats: Digital download
Strangers	Scheduled release: October 9, 2020 (US); Label: Field Trip; Formats: Digital download
Counterparts	Scheduled release: August 13, 2021 (US); Label: Warner/Field Trip; Formats: Digital download
Thorns	Scheduled release: August 12, 2022 (US); Label: Warner/Field Trip; Formats: Digital download

=== Singles ===
List of singles as a lead artist with selected details
Title	Year	Album
"Ghosts"	2020	Strangers
"Fresh Out"	2020	Strangers
"Just Because"	2021	Counterparts
"Thorns"	2022	Thorns
