= Rich Minion =

2022 single by Yeat

Single by Yeat
- Released: June 28, 2022
- Genre: Trap
- Length: 2:45
- Label: Back Lot; Field Trip; Listen To The Kids; Geffen; Interscope; Twizzy Rich
- Songwriters: Noah Olivier Smith, Divjot Abhol
- Producer: Lotto

Yeat singles chronology
"Tonka Talk" (2022)	"Rich Minion" (2022)	"Talk" (2022)

"Rich Minion" is a song written and performed by American rapper Yeat, released through Back Lot Music, Field Trip Recordings, Listen To The Kids, Geffen Records, and Interscope Records on June 28, 2022 as a single. The song was featured in the trailer of the 2022 film, Minions: The Rise of Gru made by Lyrical Lemonade, but was released as a standalone single rather than as part of the soundtrack album.

== Background ==
About the song and its creation, Elliot Montanez on behalf of Lyrical Lemonade said:

Most of our fans know that we don't do collaborations often, but when we do, it's usually something that makes a memorable moment. I'm sure at no point did anyone ever expect Lyrical Lemonade to collaborate with the Minions, but here we are! Not only did Lyrical Lemonade founder Cole Bennett direct the trailer for the new Minions movie, but he also convinced them to have Yeat create the soundtrack to it! This is one of the most exciting moments in my time at Lyrical [Lemonade], this is an amazing moment and I hope that we all can take a minute to appreciate it.

== Composition ==
In the chorus, Yeat references how much he got paid to write and record a song for the movie: "I made a song for the Minions / How much they pay me? A million". Yeat samples the Minions from the movie throughout the song, as they repeat: "Ha (Huh?), hey Mel, la bastichi/ La papaya, du la potato (Yeah, la potato, oh, yeah)".

== Trend and impact ==
The song caused a trend around the world called Gentleminions, in which a group of people wear formal attire to watch the movie. Several movie theatres have stated that they would refuse entry to people who dressed up formally due to a history of trend participants throwing items in the theatres.

== Charts ==
Chart performance for "Rich Minion"
Chart (2022)	Peak position
Canada (Canadian Hot 100)	94
New Zealand Hot Singles (RMNZ)	30
US Billboard Hot 100	99
