= Lyfe (EP) =

EP by Yeat
- Released: September 9, 2022
- Genres: Rage, trap
- Length: 34:09
- Labels: Field Trip; Geffen; Twizzy Rich
- Producers: BenjiCold; Bnyx; Dulio; Luca Malaspina; madebyjarel; Mingo; Osmo; Opium Jai; Outlit; Snapz

Yeat chronology
2 Alive (2022)	Lyfe (2022)	Afterlyfe (2023)

Singles from Lyfe
- 1. "Talk" Released: September 2, 2022

Lyfe (stylized as Lyfë) is the sixth extended play by American rapper Yeat. It was released through Geffen Records, Field Trip and Twizzy Rich on September 9, 2022. The album features a guest appearance from Lil Uzi Vert.

== Background and promotion ==
On June 15, 2022, Yeat took to Twitter to announce the title of the EP. On September 2, 2022, he released the lead single, "Talk", a collaboration with American producer Bnyx. Upon releasing the EP's single "Talk", Yeat confirmed on Instagram that his forthcoming EP would release the following week on September 9, 2022.

== Commercial performance ==
Lyfe debuted at number ten on the US Billboard 200 with 30,000 sales in its first week, becoming Yeat's second top-ten project. The EP also accumulated a total of 42.08 million on-demand streams of the EP's songs during the tracking week.

== Critical reception ==
Professional ratings
Review scores
Source	Rating
Pitchfork	7.0/10

In a positive review, Pitchfork praised Yeat's unique style and energy, and felt that it was one of his strongest efforts to date, writing: "Rage rap can be rote and exhausting, but in small doses—like on the Portland rapper's new pared-down and hypnotic album—the style can be ridiculous fun, electrifying, and hyperreal."

== Track listing ==
Lyfe track listing
No.	Title	Writer(s)	Producer(s)	Length
1.	"Flawless" (featuring Lil Uzi Vert)	Noah Smith; Benjamin Saint-Fort; Symere Woods	Bnyx	2:56
2.	"Up Off X"	Smith; Zamani Mona; Sazhin Yaroslav Andreevich	Opium Jai; madebyjarel	3:18
3.	"Out the Way"	Smith; Saint-Fort; Niles Groce	Bnyx; Snapz	2:30
4.	"Wat It Feel Lyke"	Smith; Saint-Fort	Bnyx	2:10
5.	"Got It All"	Smith; Abdul Moiz; Alexander Reid-Lynch	Dulio; Osmo	2:51
6.	"Can't Stop It"	Smith; Fort	Bnyx	2:12
7.	"Krank"	Smith; Matthew Jefferson Rulloda	Mingo	2:55
8.	"Talk"	Smith; Saint-Fort	Bnyx	2:54
9.	"Come On"	Smith; James Addison	BenjiCold	3:24
10.	"System"	Smith; Samuel Buckley	Outlit	2:46
11.	"Holy 1"	Smith; Luca Malaspina	Malaspina	3:21
12.	"Killin Em"	Smith; Saint-Fort	Bnyx	2:52
Total length:				34:09

Notes

- Any song title that contains the letter 'e' is replaced with 'ë'. For example, "Flawless" is stylized as "Flawlëss". If a song contains two or more 'e's, then only the last one is replaced.
- Only the first letter of each song title is capitalized. For example, "Out thë Way" is stylized as "Out thë way"

== Personnel ==
- Rich Keller – mastering
- Noah Smith – mixing, recording

== Charts ==
Chart performance for Lyfe
Chart (2022–2023)	Peak position
Austrian Albums (Ö3 Austria)	57
Belgian Albums (Ultratop Flanders)	90
Canadian Albums (Billboard)	24
Finnish Albums (Suomen virallinen lista)	49
Lithuanian Albums (AGATA)	5
New Zealand Albums (RMNZ)	36
Polish Albums (ZPAV)	84
US Billboard 200	10

== Certifications ==
Certifications for Lyfe
Region	Certification	Certified units/sales
Canada (Music Canada)	Gold	40,000^{‡}
Poland (ZPAV)	Gold	10,000^{‡}
United States (RIAA)	Gold	500,000^{‡}
^{‡} Sales+streaming figures based on certification alone.
