= Money So Big =

2021 song by Yeat

Song by Yeat

from the album Up 2 Me
- Released: September 10, 2021
- Genre: Rage
- Length: 2:40
- Label: Interscope; Twizzy Rich
- Songwriters: Noah Olivier Smith; Jammarius Hill; Kostya Ryzhkov; Divjot Abhol
- Producers: Trgc; Nest

"Money So Big" (stylized as "Monëy so big") is a song by American rapper Yeat from his debut studio album Up 2 Me (2021). It was produced by Trgc and Nest. It gained traction through the video-sharing platform TikTok and has become Yeat's most popular songs.

== Composition ==
AllMusic described Yeat as "bending melodic hooks into distorted bleats on the fast-switching flows" in the song.

== Charts ==
=== Weekly charts ===
Chart performance for "Money So Big"
Chart (2022)	Peak position
Canada (Canadian Hot 100)	88
US Billboard Hot 100	95
US Hot R&B/Hip-Hop Songs (Billboard)	31

=== Year-end charts ===
2022 year-end chart performance for "Monëy So Big"
Chart (2022)	Position
US Hot R&B/Hip-Hop Songs (Billboard)	87

== Certifications ==
Certifications for "Money So Big"
Region	Certification	Certified units/sales
New Zealand (RMNZ)	Gold	15,000^{‡}
United Kingdom (BPI)	Silver	200,000^{‡}
United States (RIAA)	Platinum	1,000,000^{‡}
^{‡} Sales+streaming figures based on certification alone.
