= Up 2 Me =

Studio album by Yeat
- Released: September 10, 2021
- Genres: Hip-hop; digicore; rage
- Length: 56:28
- Labels: Interscope; Foundation; Twizzy Rich
- Producers: Yeat; Jonah Abraham; Artist; AyeMajin; Based1; Bnyx; Bred; Bugz Ronin; Dulio; F1lthy; Flansie; Gokami; Lucian; Lukrative; Malikai; Nest; Numbernine; Nuu; Outlit; Pink; Rio; Sharkboy; Skimayne; Snapz; Snypes; Starboyrob; Subzeroswiz; Synthetic; Thankyouwill; Trgc

Yeat chronology
Trendi (2021)	Up 2 Me (2021)	2 Alive (2022)

Singles from Up 2 Me
- 1. "Get Busy" Released: August 29, 2021

Up 2 Me (stylized as Up 2 Më) is the debut studio album by the American rapper Yeat. It was released on September 10, 2021, through Interscope Records, Foundation Media, and Twizzy Rich. It was supported by the single "Get Busy" and features a sole guest appearance from SeptembersRich. In 2022, it entered the US Billboard 200 at number 183 and ultimately peaked at number 58.

== Background ==
Yeat rose to prominence following the release of his 2021 mixtape 4L, which spawned the viral hits "Sorry Bout That" and "Money Twerk" and secured him a one-album distribution deal with Interscope Records. He then met Zack Bia, the founder of Field Trip Recordings, who introduced him to Lil Yachty, Drake, and the music video director Cole Bennett.

== Style and composition ==
=== Overview ===
Up 2 Me is primarily a rage album, although it has also been described as "digicore-inspired". Pitchfork's Alphonse Pierre compared it favorably to what he viewed as the "hollow" efforts of Ken Carson and Trippie Redd on their 2021 rage albums Project X and Trip at Knight. According to Pierre, while others in the genre were making "shameless ploy[s] for streams", Yeat showcased an ability to "bend and shape his voice without ever making it feel gimmicky". Characterized as quirky and refreshing, Yeat's vocal performance has been compared to Future, Travis Scott, Chief Keef, T-Pain, Young Thug, and Playboi Carti.

=== Songs ===
"Get Busy"
"Get Busy" is an example of Yeat's unique vocalism and production style.

On "Get Busy", Yeat invokes Dr. Seuss after breaking the fourth wall by declaring, "This song already was turnt, but here's a bell", a line followed by clanging church bells that envelope the beat and its "droning synths and nervous hi-hats". "Let Ya Know" and "Bak on Em" see Yeat confront his addiction to percocet. Suggesting the former "could be my last song", he bounces "between reckless drug talk and slight introspection" on the latter as his numb, emotionless vocals are "consumed by a beat so drowned-out that the only immediately recognizable sound is a chiming bell". Still, Yeat makes light of his struggle on "Trendy Way" when he raps, "this perky got me snail, you should call me Gary". Using his voice as an instrument on "Turban", Yeat re-creates "the tweedle of birdsong, the glitchiness of bad cell service, [and] the groan of a plastic straw puncturing the lid of a Big Gulp"; all of this culminates in a cry for a "Tonka truck" reminiscent of an exorcism.

== Release and promotion ==
Up 2 Me's lead single, "Get Busy", was first teased in August 2021 via a snippet shared online. As heard in the snippet, Yeat's line "This song already was turnt, but here's a bell" is followed by a cascade of ringing bells. This moment helped the song go viral on social media, where it was quoted by Lil Yachty, Drake, and the comedian Druski. On August 29, the song was officially released alongside a music video. In 2026, the album was reissued on vinyl and CD to commemorate the fifth anniversary of its release.

=== Commercial performance ===
In January 2022, Up 2 Me debuted at number 183 on the US Billboard 200 before peaking at number 58 in February. The album was Yeat's first entry on the chart.

=== In media ===
In 2022, several songs from the album were used in outside contexts. On television, "U Could Tell" was featured in the Euphoria episode "You Who Cannot See, Think of Those Who Can". In sports, "Money So Big" played as the Swedish Olympic champion Armand Duplantis broke the pole vaulting world record. And in advertising, the instrumental for "Turban" was used in a Nike and Dick's Sporting Goods commercial.

== Critical reception ==
Professional ratings
Review scores
Source	Rating
AllMusic	4/5 stars
Pitchfork	6.7/10

Up 2 Me received generally positive reviews from All Music, Alphonse Pierre of Pitchfork, and Chris Richards of The Washington Post.

In his Washington Post piece on Yeat, Chris Richards noted that Yeat "visits nearly every corner of his lungs, throat, mouth and sinuses on 'Turban'", and that "his approach still feels avant and inventive. Rhyming in alien purrs and phantasmal coos, it's as if he's melting into his beats".

Pitchfork reviewer Alphonse Pierre claims that "Yeat's inspiration feels like it refreshingly goes beyond Whole Lotta Red" while giving the album a 6.7/10. AllMusic stated that "It's funny, weird, and infectious, like the best of Up 2 Më. Uncommon production choices and Yeat's laid-back but surprisingly off-center personality make these tracks a breath of fresh air in a commercial rap landscape where artists and songs can sometimes feel interchangeable".

Year-end list rankings

Year‑end lists
Publication	List	Rank	Ref.
The Washington Post	Best music of 2021	9	

== Track listing ==
All lyrics are written by Noah Smith (Yeat), except "Cmon" and "Get Busy", written with Leon Hendriks (Skimayne) and Tuheij Maruwanaya (Flansie), "Morning Mudd", written with Daniel Perez (Bugz Ronin), and "Trendy Way", written with Canyon Moore (SeptembersRich).

Up 2 Me track listing
No.	Title	Producer(s)	Length
1.	"Cmon"	Flansie; Skimayne	1:42
2.	"Morning Mudd"	Bugz Ronin	2:24
3.	"Got Rich"	Yeat; F1lthy; Lucian; Lukrative	2:01
4.	"Let Ya Know"	Bred; Pink	2:33
5.	"Stayed tha Same"	Bnyx; Snapz	2:35
6.	"Get Busy"	Yeat; Flansie; Skimayne	2:37
7.	"Rokstar"	AyeMajin; Gokami; Starboyrob	2:13
8.	"Trendy Way" (featuring SeptembersRich)	Sharkboy	3:20
9.	"Swerved It"	Outlit	2:17
10.	"Ya Ya"	Rio; Synthetic	2:18
11.	"U Could Tell"	Yeat; Subzeroswiz	2:28
12.	"Factz"	Yeat; Synthetic	2:41
13.	"Bak on Em"	Yeat; Rio	2:00
14.	"Hey"	Yeat; Bnyx; Nuu	2:37
15.	"Turban"	Artist	2:35
16.	"Twizzy Rich"	Yeat; Synthetic	2:41
17.	"Told Ya"	Dulio; Malikai	3:08
18.	"Money So Big"	Nest; Trgc	2:40
19.	"Deserve It"	Yeat; Jonah Abraham; F1lthy; Lukrative	1:50
20.	"Kant Change"	Subzeroswiz	2:10
21.	"Callin Me"	Bnyx; Numbernine; Snypes	2:35
22.	"Lying 4 Fun"	Yeat; Based1; Thankyouwill	5:03
Total length:			56:28

=== Notes ===
- Any song title that contains the letter 'e' is replaced with 'ë'. For example, "U Could Tell" is stylized as "U could tëll". If a song contains two or more 'e's, then only the first one is replaced.
- Only the first letter of each song title is capitalized (except "Get Busy", "Ya Ya", "Twizzy Rich" and "Swerved It"). For example, "Money So Big" is stylized as "Monëy so big".

== Charts ==
=== Weekly charts ===
Weekly chart performance for Up 2 Me
Chart (2022)	Peak position
Canadian Albums (Billboard)	81
Lithuanian Albums (AGATA)	75
US Billboard 200	58
US Top R&B/Hip-Hop Albums (Billboard)	31

=== Year-end charts ===
2022 year-end chart performance for Up 2 Me
Chart (2022)	Position
US Billboard 200	175
US Top R&B/Hip-Hop Albums (Billboard)	72
