= IDGAF (Drake song) =

Song by Drake featuring Yeat

from the album For All the Dogs
- Released: October 6, 2023
- Genre: Trap; rage
- Length: 4:20
- Label: OVO; Republic
- Songwriters: Aubrey Graham; Noah Smith; Benjamin Saint Fort; Sebastian Shah; Norma Winstone; John Taylor
- Producers: Bnyx; Shah

Audio video
- "IDGAF" on YouTube

"IDGAF" is a song by Canadian rapper Drake featuring American rapper Yeat. It was released through OVO and Republic as the seventh track from Drake's eighth studio album, For All the Dogs, on October 6, 2023. The song was written alongside Norma Winstone, John Taylor, and producers Bnyx and Sebastian Shah.

== Background ==
The two artists were first linked together in August 2023, after Yeat received a shoutout by Drake for his song "Bigger Then Everything". On September 13, the rappers teamed up for a promotional campaign of Drake's NOCTA fashion collaboration with Nike.

== Composition ==
"IDGAF" was produced by Bnyx and Sebastian Shah and starts out with a sample "The Tunnel" (1977) by Azimuth. Yeat later interrupts the intro and proceeds with his "droning" verse over "sci-fi synthesizers" Over a running time of four minutes and 20 seconds, Drake and Yeat exchange hooks and verses on a "glitch-y bass thumper". The "raucous bass-heavy" production, akin to "rage beats", sees the rappers brag about their fame, talent and wealth, wasting "no energy" to think about people "beneath them".

== Critical reception ==
The staff of The Fader viewed the track as one of their favorite moments on the album. Writer Nadine Smith argued that, by simply serving as an "afterthought", Drake gives Yeat enough room to "do his thing and get weird". On the contrary, Kyle Denis of Billboard ranked "IDGAF" as one of the five worst tracks on For All the Dogs, once again highlighting Yeat's guest appearance as a "victory above else". While Denis acknowledges that Drake does not sound out of place or "awkward" next to Yeat, the latter was seen as having been given his "golden opportunity", effectively seizing his moment. Chris Richards of The Washington Post criticized Drake's performance on the track, labeling him a "cardboard cutout inserted" into what he thought was an otherwise "great Yeat track".

== Commercial performance ==
The song debuted at number one in Canada and on the Billboard Global 200, and at number two on the Billboard Hot 100. In its second week, the song remained in the top ten in the US Billboard Hot 100, falling to number four. The song also reached number one on the Billboard Streaming Songs chart, marking Drake's 20th number one record on said chart.

== Charts ==
=== Weekly charts ===
Weekly chart performance for "IDGAF"
Chart (2023–2024)	Peak position
Australia (ARIA)	6
Australia Hip Hop/R&B (ARIA)	3
Austria (Ö3 Austria Top 40)	16
Belgium (Billboard)	19
Canada Hot 100 (Billboard)	1
Czech Republic Singles Digital (ČNS IFPI)	20
Denmark (Tracklisten)	25
Finland (Suomen virallinen lista)	49
France (SNEP)	25
Germany (GfK)	62
Global 200 (Billboard)	1
Greece International (IFPI)	2
Hungary (Single Top 40)	17
Iceland (Tónlistinn)	3
Ireland (IRMA)	9
Italy (FIMI)	45
Latvia (LaIPA)	1
Lithuania (AGATA)	5
Luxembourg (Billboard)	5
MENA (IFPI)	12
Netherlands (Single Top 100)	24
New Zealand (Recorded Music NZ)	6
Norway (VG-lista)	13
Poland (Polish Streaming Top 100)	23
Portugal (AFP)	11
Romania (Billboard)	13
Slovakia Singles Digital (ČNS IFPI)	7
South Africa Streaming (TOSAC)	5
Sweden (Sverigetopplistan)	43
Switzerland (Schweizer Hitparade)	6
UAE (IFPI)	5
UK Singles (Official Charts)	5
UK Hip Hop/R&B (Official Charts)	3
US Billboard Hot 100	2
US Hot R&B/Hip-Hop Songs (Billboard)	2

=== Year-end charts ===
2023 year-end chart performance for "IDGAF"
Chart (2023)	Position
Hungary (Single Top 40)	93

2024 year-end chart performance for "IDGAF"
Chart (2024)	Position
Canada (Canadian Hot 100)	54
Global 200 (Billboard)	169
US Billboard Hot 100	83
US Hot R&B/Hip-Hop Songs (Billboard)	27

== Certifications ==
Certifications for "IDGAF"
Region	Certification	Certified units/sales
Australia (ARIA)	Gold	35,000^{‡}
Brazil (Pro-Música Brasil)	Platinum	40,000^{‡}
Canada (Music Canada)	2× Platinum	160,000^{‡}
New Zealand (RMNZ)	Platinum	30,000^{‡}
Poland (ZPAV)	Platinum	50,000^{‡}
Portugal (AFP)	Gold	5,000^{‡}
United Kingdom (BPI)	Silver	200,000^{‡}
Streaming
Greece (IFPI Greece)	Gold	1,000,000^{†}
^{‡} Sales+streaming figures based on certification alone.^{†} Streaming-only figures based on certification alone.
