= Minions: The Rise of Gru =

2022 American animated film by Kyle Balda

- Theatrical release poster
- Directed by: Kyle Balda
- Screenplay by: Matthew Fogel
- Story by: Brian Lynch; Matthew Fogel
- Produced by: Chris Meledandri; Janet Healy; Chris Renaud
- Starring: Steve Carell; Pierre Coffin; Taraji P. Henson; Michelle Yeoh; Russell Brand; Lucy Lawless; Dolph Lundgren; Danny Trejo; Jean-Claude Van Damme; Julie Andrews; Alan Arkin
- Edited by: Claire Dodgson
- Music by: Heitor Pereira
- Production companies: Universal Pictures; Illumination
- Distributed by: Universal Pictures
- Release dates: June 13, 2022 (Annecy); July 1, 2022 (United States)
- Running time: 87 minutes
- Country: United States
- Language: English
- Budget: $80–100 million
- Box office: $940 million

Minions: The Rise of Gru is a 2022 American animated comedy film directed by Kyle Balda, and written by Matthew Fogel from a story by Fogel and Brian Lynch. Produced by Universal Pictures and Illumination, it is the second installment in the Minions prequel series and the fifth overall installment in the Despicable Me franchise. It features Steve Carell reprising his role as Gru and Pierre Coffin as the Minions, along with Russell Brand, Will Arnett, Steve Coogan and Julie Andrews. New cast members include Taraji P. Henson, Michelle Yeoh and Alan Arkin in his final film role. Following up after the events of Minions (2015), an eleven-year-old Gru plans to become a supervillain with the help of his Minions, which leads to a showdown with a malevolent team, the Vicious 6.

After being delayed for two years due to the COVID-19 pandemic, Minions: The Rise of Gru had its world premiere at the Annecy International Animation Film Festival on June 13, 2022, and was theatrically released in the United States on July 1 by Universal. The film received mostly positive reviews from critics, with praise earned for its score, animation, humor, voice performances (particularly Carell's), and aesthetic, while also considering it an improvement to its predecessor, however some criticized its plot. It was also a commercial success, grossing $940 million worldwide and becoming the fifth-highest-grossing film of 2022. A third installment in the Minions series, Minions & Monsters, was released on July 1, 2026.

== Plot ==
In 1976, an eleven-year-old Gru dreams of becoming a supervillain, assisted by the Minions, whom he has hired to work for him. Gru is ecstatic when he receives an audition invitation from the Vicious 6, a supervillain team now led by Belle Bottom, who hope to find a new member to replace their founder, the supervillain Wild Knuckles, following their betrayal and attempted murder of Knuckles during a heist to steal the Zodiac Stone—a stone connected to the Chinese zodiac. Gru's interview goes poorly but, much to the outrage of the Vicious 6, he steals the stone and escapes with Minions Kevin, Stuart and Bob, handing it to another Minion, Otto, for safekeeping.

At his basement lair, Gru is outraged that Otto has traded the zodiac stone for a pet rock, firing the Minions before going alone to find it. However, Knuckles kidnaps Gru before taking him to San Francisco and informs the Minions that if they do not give him the stone within 48 hours, Gru will be killed. Failing to locate the stone, Kevin, Stuart and Bob leave for San Francisco to rescue Gru, while Otto leaves in pursuit of a biker whom he realizes has the stone as a necklace. When they reach Knuckles' house, they are chased by his goons until Master Chow, a former kung fu teacher who now makes a living at an acupuncture clinic, rescues them by defeating the goons.

The Minions learn kung fu, ending their training prematurely, and go to Knuckles' home to rescue Gru. Meanwhile, Otto catches up to and befriends the biker at Death Valley, who gives the stone back and takes him to San Francisco. Gru begins to bond with Knuckles after the latter's goons quit on him, and later saves him from being eaten by crocodiles in his pool. To begin teaching Gru how to be a villain, the two rob the Bank of Evil. In the meantime, the Vicious 6, having realized that Knuckles is alive, destroy his house in an attempt to find him. Failing to do so, they head towards Chinatown, with Kevin, Stuart and Bob in pursuit.

Returning to his destroyed house, a distraught Knuckles laments his friends' betrayal and decides to give up villainy, sending Gru away. During a Chinese New Year parade in Chinatown, Otto and Gru find each other with the stone but are cornered by the Vicious 6, who in turn are confronted by Anti-Villain League agents. The Vicious 6 then use the stone to turn themselves into enormous superpowered versions of animals from the Zodiac and prepare to kill Gru by tying him to the hands of a clock tower to rip him apart. Kevin, Stuart and Bob find Gru, but are turned into a rabbit, a rooster and a goat, respectively. However, Knuckles returns and fights the Vicious 6 with the Minions. Encouraged by Chow's teaching, Kevin, Stuart and Bob battle the Vicious 6 while Otto saves Gru, but Knuckles is critically burnt by Belle's dragon flames when trying to take the stone back. After Kevin, Stuart and Bob knock the Vicious 6 out, Gru uses the stone to turn them into rats. Congratulating the three Minions for saving his life, Gru reconciles with and rehires the Minions before returning Stuart, Kevin, and Bob back to normal.

The Vicious 6 are arrested, except Knuckles, who is hospitalized and seemingly succumbs to his injuries, while the stone is confiscated by the Anti-Villain League. At Knuckles' funeral, Gru gives a heartfelt eulogy but is overjoyed when he finds that Knuckles faked his death. Later, Gru hires Dr. Nefario in gratitude for an invention of his that helped him steal the stone.

== Voice cast ==
- Steve Carell as Gru, a rising supervillain and the boss of the Minions
- Pierre Coffin as Kevin, Stuart, Bob, Otto and the rest of the Minions, Gru's yellow, troublesome, newly hired henchmen
- Alan Arkin as Wild Knuckles, the former leader of the Vicious 6 who later becomes Gru's mentor
- Taraji P. Henson as Belle Bottom, a disco-themed master thief and the newly-appointed leader of the Vicious 6
- Michelle Yeoh as Master Chow, an acupuncturist and Kung Fu fighter who helps the Minions on their quest
- Julie Andrews as Marlena Gru, Gru's mother
- Russell Brand as Dr. Nefario, a scientist who runs a record store. This is the final time Brand voices Dr. Nefario.
- Jean-Claude Van Damme as Jean-Clawed, a member of the Vicious 6 with a giant mechanical lobster claw for his right arm
- Dolph Lundgren as Svengeance, a member of the Vicious 6 who is a roller skater
- Danny Trejo as Stronghold, a member of the Vicious 6 with superhuman strength and big metal hands
- Lucy Lawless as Nun-chuck, a member of the Vicious 6 who is a nun and wields nunchaku

Additionally, Will Arnett and Steve Coogan reprise their respective voice roles as Mr. Perkins and Silas Ramsbottom from the main Despicable Me films. While Michael Beattie voices both the VNC announcer and Guru Rick. Jimmy O. Yang, Kevin Michael Richardson and John DiMaggio voiced three of Wild Knuckles' henchmen; the latter previously voiced the Scoutmaster in the Minion Scouts animated short from 2019. RZA voices the biker who Otto befriends on his way to San Francisco. Raymond S. Persi voices Brad, the biker's nephew who Otto traded his pet rock for the Zodiac Stone.

== Production ==
Production and character designer Eric Guillon was ordered to unravel Gru's secrets once he started working on Despicable Me (2010) in 2007. After the commercial success of Minions (2015), Screen Daily considered a sequel to be "inevitable". Universal Pictures was developing sequel ideas in August 2017, and Guillon decided that these will explore Gru's early life. Pierre Coffin (the Minions) and Steve Carell (Gru) both reprised their Despicable Me roles. Carell was paid $12.5 million for his involvement. Production of the film shifted to remote work during the COVID-19 pandemic, following the temporary closure of Illumination Studios Paris. To incorporate 1970s culture and environment in the film, Wade Eastwood and Ric Meyers were hired as creative consultants while Flora Zhao joined in as a cultural consultant on Chinese culture. The film was officially completed on July 1, 2020.

The film was dedicated in memory of animator Madeline Montero, who died during production of the film.

== Music ==
The soundtrack album for the film was released on July 1, 2022, through Decca Records and Verve Label Group. The Jack Antonoff-produced soundtrack consists of various contemporary artists covering famous funk, pop and soul hits of the 1970s. "Turn Up the Sunshine" by Diana Ross and Tame Impala was released as the album's lead single on May 20, 2022. It was followed by Kali Uchis's cover of "Desafinado" and St. Vincent's cover of "Funkytown".

On July 8, 2022, the score from longtime Illumination composer Heitor Pereira was released with two versions of "Bad Moon Rising" and "You Can't Always Get What You Want" being performed by Steve Carell and Pierre Coffin, both songs that were not in the original soundtrack. A new version of the "Despicable Me" theme song, by Pereira and Pharrell Williams, featuring a chorus of children was used in the film but not included in the score or the soundtrack.

== Marketing and release ==
Universal's marketing strategy entailed an active social media campaign, and worldwide tours and activations. Promotional partners included CarMax, HelloFresh, IHOP, Levi's, Liberty Mutual and McDonald's. A trailer of Minions: The Rise of Gru was released in 2020, followed by another two in 2022. The first and third trailers featured "Sabotage" by Beastie Boys and "Lose Yourself" by Eminem in the second. For "Sabotage", Britt Hayes of The A.V. Club highlighted its "primitive" use in the first trailer, while Adam Pockross of Syfy Wire elaborated that the song performed screaming voices in the third. Some commentators reasoned that "Lose Yourself" impacted the film's action scenes in the second trailer. (Note: Attributed to multiple references:) Deadline Hollywood reported Universal spent $140 million promoting The Rise of Gru, and a total of $285 million on marketing, the biggest-ever campaign for a Despicable Me film.

Minions: The Rise of Gru debuted at the Annecy International Animated Film Festival on June 13, 2022, followed by a premiere on June 25, at the TCL Chinese Theatre in Hollywood, Los Angeles. The film was initially scheduled for release on July 3, 2020, but was postponed to July 2, 2021, and finally July 1, 2022. These shifts were reportedly made in response to the COVID-19 pandemic, which led to Illumination Mac Guff's temporary closure as the film was unfinished at that time. (Note: Attributed to multiple references:) The film was rumored to have been banned in Lebanon. While the reason for the ban has not been specified, users on social media speculate it was because the character Nun-chuck portrays nuns as evil. The theatrical Chinese release of the film replaced the ending scene with a message stating that Wild Knuckles was arrested and sentenced to twenty years in prison, pursued his love of acting and started his own theater troupe, while Gru "returned to his family".

Universal Pictures Home Entertainment released Minions: The Rise of Gru for digital download on August 30, 2022; on 4K Ultra HD Blu-ray, Blu-ray and DVD on September 6; and on Peacock on September 23. Physical copies contain behind-the-scenes featurettes, character descriptions, an extended scene, outtakes, recreational activities and short films Post Modern Minions and Minions and Monsters. As part of an 18-month deal for animated films from Universal, it streamed on Peacock for four months, before moving to Netflix for another ten in January 2023, and returned on Peacock for the last four that November. The Rise of Gru was the best-selling home-video release of September. Blu-ray accounted for 48 percent of its sales. By the end of 2022, the physical release had grossed about $14 million.

== Reception ==
=== Box office ===
Minions: The Rise of Gru grossed $370.3 million in the United States and Canada, and $569.9 million in other territories, for a worldwide total of $940.2 million. It was the fifth-highest-grossing film of 2022. Deadline Hollywood calculated the film's net profit as $368 million, accounting for production budgets, marketing, talent participations and other costs; box-office grosses and home media revenues placed it third on their list of 2022's "Most Valuable Blockbusters". The Rise of Gru's box-office success was attributed to its release date near Independence Day. Its marketing, which was said to have brought back families to theaters, was also cited. (Note: Attributed to multiple references:) According to Comscore analyst Paul Dergarabedian, the film was "perfectly executed" for family audiences, and Boxoffice Pro chief analyst Shawn Robbins elaborated this as a "pent-up demand" journey.

In the United States and Canada, Minions: The Rise of Gru was initially projected to gross $70–80 million from 4,391 theaters over its four-day opening weekend. After making $48.2 million on its first day (including an estimated $10.8 million from Thursday previews), the best for an animated film among the pandemic and of the Despicable Me franchise, estimates were raised to $129 million. It went on to debut to $107 million (and a four-day total of $123.1 million), topping the box office. Its total set the Independence Day weekend record, surpassing Transformers: Dark of the Moon's $115.9 million in 2011. The film made $46.1 million in its second weekend (a drop of 57%), finishing second behind newcomer Thor: Love and Thunder. Minions: The Rise of Gru is the sixth highest-grossing film of 2022 in this region.

The film opened in Australia a week before its U.S. release, debuting at $3.7 million. It added another 60 international markets in its sophomore weekend and made $87.2 million. The combined first and second offshore weekends were 13% below Minions and 3% below Despicable Me 3 (2017). Four countries—Argentina, Saudi Arabia, Israel and Venezuela—had the biggest opening weekend of all time for an animated film. The popular TikTok trend that accompanied its release (see below) was credited for Israel's record-breaking performance. In its third international weekend, Minions: The Rise of Gru passed the $400 million worldwide mark after adding $56.4 million to its total. In France, it set records for the biggest Illumination animation opening day of all time, the third-biggest animation opening day of all time, and the biggest opening (including previews) of 2022. The film passed the $500 million worldwide mark in its fourth weekend, $600 million worldwide by its fifth, and $700 million worldwide by its sixth.

=== Critical response ===
On the review aggregator website Rotten Tomatoes, 70% of 184 critics' reviews are positive, with an average rating of 6.1/10. The website's consensus reads: "The Minions' antic shenanigans are beginning to grate despite this sequel's injection of retro chic, although this loony marathon of gags will still delight young children." Metacritic, which uses a weighted average, assigned the film a score of 56 out of 100, based on 41 critics, indicating "mixed or average" reviews. Audiences polled by CinemaScore gave the film an average grade of "A" on an A+ to F scale, the same grade as its predecessor, while those at PostTrak gave the film an 87% overall positive score, with 71% saying they would definitely recommend it.

Johnny Oleksinski from the New York Post rated the film three out of four stars, stating that "while a tad too light, as these films often are, nobody is making animated characters as funny or likable (or marketable) as the Minions." Serena Puang from Boston Globe gave the film two and a half stars out of four and wrote: "The movie is fun: The music is unironically good—a particular standout is the Minions's rendition of Simon and Garfunkel's 'Cecilia'; Bob, as cute as ever, learns that 'even the smallest of us are capable of great things'."

Scroll.in's Udita Jhunjhunwala, giving a positive review, wrote: "The animated comedy is an 88-minute delight, further enlivened by the talented voice cast..." Clarisse Loughrey from The Independent rated the film three out of five stars, saying that "There's nothing all that special about The Rise of Gru, but it runs like a well-oiled machine." RogerEbert.com's Odie Henderson rated the film three out of five stars and praised the humor, writing, "The laughs are well paced and the viewer isn't given too much time to reflect on how ridiculous Matthew Fogel's screenplay is", despite feeling the pacing was "breakneck". He also commended the film's animation, deeming it "striking, from the gorgeously rendered Chinatown of the City by the Bay to the charming look of young Gru. He has the same big, expressive eyes that fill the emotional faces of his 'little gurls'", and its voice acting, stating that Carrell "does a fine job of making his Gru voice younger and less pronounced".

Peter Travers of ABC News stated: "Director Kyle Balda creates a traffic jam of chases and collisions with the Vicious Six morphing into giant animals, including dragons, tigers and monkeys. It's all too much and too ditzy. But would you want it any other way?". The Associated Press's Jake Coyle scored the film two-and-a-half stars out of four and ended his review, "If anything, the Minion craze has proven the timeless versatility of the googly-eyed henchmen—a cartoon concoction of childlike slapstick simplicity and eminent pliability. It's enough to make you curious to imagine the Minions in subsequent decades—on Wall Street in the '80s, maybe, or head banging at a Nirvana concert in 1990s Seattle."

Peter Bradshaw from The Guardian rated the film two stars out of five, writing that "the plot is perfunctory and it runs on the faintest of fumes". Bilge Ebiri from Vulture gave the film a negative review, writing that "it looks nice, the kids will enjoy it, and, at 87 minutes, it all goes down relatively smoothly—but it's not quite smart enough to be as stupid as it wants to be." Los Angeles Times's Katie Walsh, in a negative review, wrote: "These references, and the relentless assault of '70s needle drops, are fun, to a point, but the movie itself is 87 minutes of pure chaos, a hallucinatory, cacophonous fever dream of nonsensical subplots and Minion gibberish."

In a 2026 interview, Pierre Coffin, who provides the voices of the Minions, stated of the film, "I don't necessarily like it and it's strange to me."

=== "Gentleminions" TikTok trend ===
A popular Internet meme involving groups of Generation Z adolescent boys dressed in suits like the character Gru attending the film and some dressing up like Minions with the tag #Gentleminions began spreading on TikTok almost immediately after the film's release. The meme originated with a group of Australian high schoolers. It is usually accompanied by American rapper Yeat's song "Rich Minion", which was commissioned for the Cole Bennett-directed trailer of the film. Large groups recorded themselves cheering, throwing bananas at the screen, and performing Gru's trademark steepled fingers gesture. Several theaters in the United Kingdom banned groups of young men in formal attire from seeing the film due to their disruptive behavior during screenings. The meme was also documented in the United States, Norway, Singapore, and Israel.

The substantial meme subculture around The Rise of Gru was noted by The Face to be similar to memes surrounding the superhero film Morbius, released earlier in 2022. Both meme subcultures focused around a largely ironic appreciation for the supposed strengths of said film, often verging on the absurdist, but The Face noted that the interest in The Rise of Gru was largely based in genuine interest in the film and nostalgia for the previous Despicable Me films, whereas the interest in Morbius was ironic due to the latter's perceived lack of quality.

The social media accounts for Universal Pictures, Illumination, and the franchise acknowledged the meme, with the latter two posting a video that depicted the Minions participating in the trend.

PostTrak reported that 34% of The Rise of Gru audiences were between the ages of 13 and 17, an unusually high percentage for an animated film. Pamela McClintock of The Hollywood Reporter concluded that the results of the survey were a result of the Internet trend.

== Accolades ==
Accolades received by Minions: The Rise of Gru
Award	Date of ceremony	Category	Recipient(s)	Result	Ref.
Annie Awards	February 25, 2023	Best Animated Television Commercial	Minions: The Rise of Gru / The Office	Nominated	
Annie Awards	February 25, 2023	Outstanding Achievement for Animated Effects in an Animated Production	Frank Baradat, Simon Pate, Milan Voukassovitch and Milo Riccarand	Nominated	
Annie Awards	February 25, 2023	Outstanding Achievement for Storyboarding in an Animated Feature Production	Nima Azarba	Nominated	
Annie Awards	February 25, 2023	Outstanding Achievement for Storyboarding in an Animated Feature Production	Dave Feiss	Nominated	
Cinema Audio Society Awards	March 4, 2023	Outstanding Achievement in Sound Mixing for a Motion Picture – Animated	Tim Nielsen, Steve Slanec, Alan Meyerson and Jason Butler	Nominated	
Golden Trailer Awards	July 22, 2021	Best Animation/Family TV Spot	"Get Ready" (Inside Job)	Nominated	
Golden Trailer Awards	July 22, 2021	Best Animation TrailerByte for a Feature Film	"Shades Dance" (Inside Job)	Nominated	
Golden Trailer Awards	October 6, 2022	Best Animation/Family	"Ready" (AV Squad)	Nominated	
Golden Trailer Awards	October 6, 2022	Best Summer Blockbuster Trailer	"Ready" (AV Squad)	Nominated	
Golden Trailer Awards	October 6, 2022	Best Animation/Family TV Spot	"Mini Boss" (TRANSIT)	Nominated	
Golden Trailer Awards	June 29, 2023	Best Animation/Family	"New Adventure" (Inside Job)	Nominated	
Golden Trailer Awards	June 29, 2023	Best Animation/Family TV Spot (for a Feature Film)	"New Adventure 60" (Inside Job)	Nominated	
Golden Trailer Awards	June 29, 2023	Best Comedy TV Spot (for a Feature Film)	"One Shot" (Inside Job)	Nominated	
Golden Trailer Awards	June 29, 2023	Best Digital – Animation/Family	"Brace Yourself/#1 Comedy" (Paradise Creative)	Nominated	
Guild of Music Supervisors Awards	March 5, 2023	Best Music Supervision for Films Budgeted Over $25 Million	Rachel Levy and Mike Knobloch	Nominated	
Guild of Music Supervisors Awards	March 5, 2023	Best Song Written and/or Recorded Created for a Film	Jack Antonoff, Kevin Parker, Sam Dew, Patrik Berger, Diana Ross, Tame Impala, Mike Knobloch and Rachel Levy for "Turn Up the Sunshine"	Nominated	
Hollywood Music in Media Awards	November 16, 2022	Best Original Song in an Animated Film	Jack Antonoff, Kevin Parker, Sam Dew, Patrik Berger, Diana Ross and Tame Impala for "Turn Up the Sunshine"	Nominated	
Hollywood Music in Media Awards	November 16, 2022	Best Music Supervision – Film	Mike Knobloch and Rachel Levy	Nominated	
Hollywood Music in Media Awards	November 16, 2022	Original Song/Score – New Media	Yeat for Minions: The Rise of Gru Lyrical Lemonade	Nominated	
Hollywood Music in Media Awards	November 16, 2022	Soundtrack Album	Minions: The Rise of Gru	Nominated	
NAACP Image Awards	February 25, 2023	Outstanding Character Voice Performance – Motion Picture	Taraji P. Henson	Nominated	
Nickelodeon Kids' Choice Awards	March 4, 2023	Favorite Animated Movie	Minions: The Rise of Gru	Won	
Nickelodeon Kids' Choice Awards	March 4, 2023	Favorite Male Voice from an Animated Movie	Steve Carell	Nominated	
Nickelodeon Kids' Choice Awards	March 4, 2023	Favorite Female Voice from an Animated Movie	Taraji P. Henson	Nominated	
Producers Guild of America Awards	February 25, 2023	Outstanding Producer of Animated Theatrical Motion Pictures	Chris Meledandri, Janet Healy and Chris Renaud	Nominated	
Saturn Awards	October 25, 2022	Best Animated Film	Minions: The Rise of Gru	Nominated	
Visual Effects Society Awards	February 15, 2023	Outstanding Visual Effects in a Commercial	Gerome Viavant, Giles de Lusignan and Benjamin Le Ster	Nominated	

== Prequel ==
A prequel was released on July 1, 2026, after having been initially set to release on June 30, 2027.

== Works cited ==
- Croll, Ben (July 12, 2022). The Art of Eric Guillon: From the Making of Despicable Me to Minions, The Secret Life of Pets, and More. San Rafael, California: Insight Editions. ISBN 9781683836810.
