= Bigger Then Everything =

2023 single by Yeat

Single by Yeat
- Released: August 10, 2023
- Length: 3:38
- Label: Geffen; Field Trip
- Songwriters: Noah Smith; Benjamin Saint-Fort; Shady El Sayed; Pierfrancesco Pasini
- Producers: Bnyx; Shadyboy; Classy

Yeat singles chronology
"My Wrist" (2023)	"Bigger Then Everything" (2023)	"King Tonka" (2024)

Music video
- "Bigger Thën Everything" on YouTube

"Bigger Then Everything" (stylized as "bigger thën everything") is a single by American rapper Yeat, released on August 10, 2023, with an accompanying music video. It was produced by Bnyx, Shadyboy and Classy.

== Background ==
The production of the song contains a melody of piano keys and bell, over which Yeat reflects on his past and rise to fame, as well as boasting his success, wealth and connections which he can use against his enemies.

== Music video ==
The official music video was directed by Cole Bennett and features a cameo from BNYX, one of the song's producers.

== Charts ==
Chart performance for "Bigger Then Everything"
Chart (2023)	Peak position
New Zealand Hot Singles (RMNZ)	16
US Bubbling Under Hot 100 (Billboard)	7
US Hot R&B/Hip-Hop Songs (Billboard)	37
