= Get Busy (Yeat song) =

2021 single by Yeat

Single by Yeat

from the album Up 2 Me
- Released: August 29, 2021
- Length: 2:37
- Label: Interscope; Twizzy Rich
- Songwriters: Noah Smith; Tuheij Maruwanaya; Leon Hendriks
- Producers: Flansie; Skimayne

Yeat singles chronology
"Flashey" (2021)	"Get Busy" (2021)	"Yeat" (2022)

Music video
- "Gët Busy" on YouTube

"Get Busy" (stylized as "Gët Busy") is a song by American rapper Yeat, released on August 29, 2021 as the lead single from his debut studio album Up 2 Me (2021). It was produced by Flansie and Skimayne. The song went viral on the video-sharing platform TikTok and significantly helped Yeat rise to fame. A snippet of the song circulated online in August 2021, particularly the line "Yeah, this song already was turnt but here's a bell" followed by a church bell, which was later quoted by celebrities such as Drake.

== Background and promotion ==
A snippet of the song circulated online in August 2021. It became a viral sensation on TikTok, following the popularization of its verse "Yeah, this song already was turnt but here's a bell", followed by a church bell ringing in a series. The lyric was later quoted by rappers and other celebrities, including Drake, Lil Yachty and Druski, giving the song more exposure. Fans kept asking for Yeat to release the full version. "Get Busy" subsequently appeared on his album Up 2 Me in September.

== Composition ==
Yeat wrote "Get Busy" alongside its producers and engineers, Flansie and Skimayne. Prash 'Engine-Earz' Mistry handled the song's mixing and mastering. "Get Busy" is 2 minutes and 37 seconds long. It is a rage song that incorporates church bells.

== Critical reception ==
Alphonse Pierre of Pitchfork gave the track a positive review, writing "Though this would usually end with everyone underwhelmed, the official single is better than the extract. Before we hear the bells, he wails over Flansie and Skimayne production that sounds like a rocket ship blasting off. This build makes the eventual payoff of the bells even more satisfying—they pull you into an out of body experience like a well-timed drop during a DJ set. And even if that moment gets run into the ground by the inevitable downside of internet virality, 'Gët Busy' is good enough beyond it to survive." Chris Richards of The Washington Post described it as "an oozing, clanging new song where the rapper connects the dots between 'Chanel,' 'jail' and 'hell' — and then, without breaking rhyme, busts through the fourth wall to say, 'This song already was turnt, but here's a bell.' On cue, a church bell that sounds bigger than a Honda CRV chimes with cosmic significance."

== Certifications and sales ==
Region	Certification	Certified units/sales
United States (RIAA)	Gold	500,000^{‡}
^{‡} Sales+streaming figures based on certification alone.
