= My Wrist =

2023 single by Yeat and Young Thug

Single by Yeat and Young Thug
- Released: May 26, 2023
- Genre: Trap
- Length: 3:10
- Label: Field Trip Recordings; Geffen
- Songwriters: Noah Smith; Jeffery Williams; Jordan Jenks
- Producers: Pi'erre Bourne; Yeat

Yeat singles chronology
"Already Rich" (2023)	"My Wrist" (2023)	"Bigger Then Everything" (2023)

Young Thug singles chronology
"Potion" (2022)	"My Wrist" (2023)	"Oh U Went" (2023)

"My Wrist" is a song by American rappers Yeat and Young Thug. It was released as a single on May 26, 2023, through Field Trip and Geffen Records.

== Charts ==
Chart performance for "My Wrist"
Chart (2023)	Peak position
New Zealand Hot Singles (RMNZ)	8
US Bubbling Under Hot 100 (Billboard)	6
US Hot R&B/Hip-Hop Songs (Billboard)	46
