= 2 Alive =

2 Alivë

Studio album by Yeat
- Released: February 18, 2022
- Genres: Trap; rage
- Length: 62:40
- Labels: Geffen; Interscope; Field Trip; Listen to the Kids; TwizzyRich
- Producers: Ace; Akachi; AM; Aunix; Bangs; Bart How; Bass Charity; BenjiCold; Brandon Finessin; Bugz Ronin; Darkboy; Dream Awake; Dulio; Earl on the Beat; F1lthy; Flansie; Frankie Bash; GeoGotBands; Ginseng; Hue; Jonah Abraham; Kele; KP Beatz; Leqn; Lil Flexer; Lucian; Lucid; Lukrative; Malikai; Matthew Gomez; Misogi; mTwenty; ninetyniiine; Rision; Skimayne; Starboyrob; Supah Mario; Synthetic; Takado; Trgc; Yeat

Yeat chronology
Up 2 Me (2021)	2 Alivë (2022)	Lyfe (2022)

2 Alive deluxe edition cover

Singles from 2 Alive
- 1. "Still Countin" Released: February 11, 2022

2 Alive (stylized as 2 Alivë) is the second studio album by American rapper Yeat. It was released on February 18, 2022, by Geffen Records, Interscope Records, Field Trip Recordings, Listen to the Kids and TwizzyRich. The album features guest appearances from Young Thug, Gunna, Yung Kayo, Ken Carson, and SeptembersRich. The album was supported by one single, "Still Countin", which was released on February 11, 2022.

The deluxe edition, titled 2 Alive (Geek Pack), was released on April 1, 2022, with additional guest appearances by Lil Uzi Vert and Lancey Foux.

== Release ==
Yeat initially announced a January 2022 release date but delayed it to wait for an additional feature. On March 16, Yeat announced a supporting tour for the album, which included dates from April 8 to May 9.

== Commercial performance ==
2 Alive sold 35,000 album-equivalent units in the first week, debuting at number 6 on the US Billboard 200 chart. It is Yeat's first US top-ten album.

== Critical reception ==
Professional ratings
Review scores
Source	Rating
AllMusic	2.5/5 stars
HipHopDX	3.7/5
Pitchfork	6.6/10

In a positive review, David Aaron Brake of HipHopDX wrote that "though he didn't expand beyond the sounds of his previous work, Yeat's latest is a master class in precision and knowing what the audience craves. Excellent rap need not always be grand in scope: 2 Alivë proves success can come just as easily through zooming in".

In a mixed review, Alphonse Pierre of Pitchfork wrote that "the 21-year-old Portland rapper isn't doing anything all that new, but he has a refreshing album-focused approach, best listened to as one continuous stream, getting lost in the noisy madness". Writing for AllMusic, David Crone felt that the album's 20-song track list is "undeniably bloated, padded out with some fairly one-dimensional material".

== Track listing ==
2 Alive track listing
No.	Title	Writer(s)	Producer(s)	Length
1.	"Poppin"	Noah Smith	BenjiCold	2:47
2.	"Outside" (featuring Young Thug)	Smith,DeMario Priester,Luzian Gregor Tuetsch, Jorge Miguel Cardoso Augusto, Harissis Tsakmaklis, Feliciano Ponce Ecar, Jeffery Lamar Williams	Supah Mario; Bass Charity	3:51
3.	"Real Six"	Smith; Abdul Moiz; Robert Jurado; Jochem van Bliijkshof	Dulio; Rision; Ace	3:29
4.	"Nvr Again"	Smith; Jammarius Hill; Bart van Hoewijk	Trgc; Bart How	2:46
5.	"Luh Geek"	Smith; George Kala	GeoGotBands	2:56
6.	"Rackz Got Me" (featuring Gunna)	Smith; Sergio Kitchens; Hill; Fyodor Viktorovich	Trgc; Takado	3:01
7.	"Double"	Smith; Javier Mercado	Synthetic	2:50
8.	"On tha Line"	Smith; Jonathan Hernandez; Pablo Sanchez	Hue; Dream Awake	2:35
9.	"Jus Better"	Smith; Sanchez; Ákos Maluzsák	Dream Awake; Flexer	3:08
10.	"Jump"	Smith; Mercado; Matthew Gomez; Robert Ferguson	Synthetic; Gomez; Starboyrob	3:12
11.	"Dnt Lie"	Smith; Isaac Bynum; Jonah Abraham; Bennett Pepple	Earl on the Beat; Abraham; Bangs	3:32
12.	"Rollin"	Smith; Jurado; Moiz	Dulio; Rision	3:36
13.	"Taliban"	Smith; Addison	BenjiCold	2:58
14.	"Narcoticz" (featuring Yung Kayo)	Smith; Malachi Green; Mercado	Synthetic; Kele	3:50
15.	"Call Me"	Smith; Jurado; Amen Temesgen	Rision; Malikai	3:40
16.	"Kant Die"	Smith; Hill; Colin Franken	Trgc; Frankie Bash	2:41
17.	"Geek High" (featuring Ken Carson)	Smith; Kenyatta Frazier Jr.; Tuheij Maruwanaya	Flansie; Skimayne^{[a]}	2:33
18.	"Luh M" (featuring SeptembersRich)	Smith; Canyon Moore; Jacques Richard; Mercado	Darkboy; Synthetic	3:30
19.	"Smooktober"	Smith; Richard Ortiz; Arman Andican	F1lthy; AM	2:55
20.	"Still Countin"	Smith; Jurado; Mercado; Tobrak Masick; Nathan Chen	Rision; Synthetic; mTwenty; ninetyniiine	2:50
Total length:				62:40

Geek Pack (deluxe edition) track listing
No.	Title	Writer(s)	Producer(s)	Length
21.	"Big Tonka" (featuring Lil Uzi Vert)	Smith; Symere Woods; Brandon Veal	Brandon Finessin; Leqn; Aunix	3:28
22.	"Kant Relax"	Smith; Maruwanaya	Flansie	2:40
23.	"No Comment"	Smith; Moiz; Christian Baello	Dulio; Ginseng	2:31
24.	"3G" (featuring Lil Uzi Vert)	Smith; Woods; Hunter Brown; Daniel Perez	Akachi; Bugz Ronin	2:51
25.	"New Turban"	Smith; Perez; Zain Siddiqui; Baello	Bugz Ronin; Yeat; Misogi; Ginseng	2:48
26.	"Hater"	Smith; Abraham; Ștefan Cișmigiu; Kenneth Pannu; Pierre Thevenot	Jonah Abraham; Lucian; KP Beatz; Lukrative	2:33
27.	"Way Back"	Smith; Perez; Catellanos; Moiz	Bugz Ronin; Lucid; Dulio	3:14
28.	"Luv Money" (featuring Lancey Foux)	Smith; Lance Omal; Perez; Mercado	Bugz Ronin; Synthetic	3:34
29.	"Dub"	Smith; Kala	GeoGotBands	2:34
Total length:				88:53

Notes

- Any song title that contains the letter 'e' is replaced with 'ë'. For example, "Rackz Got Me" is stylized as "Rackz Got Më". If a song contains two or more 'e's, then the first one is only replaced.
- ^{^[a]} signifies an uncredited co-producer

== Personnel ==
- Joe LaPorta – mastering
- Noah Smith – mixing, recording

== Charts ==
=== Weekly charts ===
Weekly chart performance for 2 Alive
Chart (2022)	Peak position
Belgian Albums (Ultratop Flanders)	89
Canadian Albums (Billboard)	19
Lithuanian Albums (AGATA)	41
US Billboard 200	6
US Top R&B/Hip-Hop Albums (Billboard)	3

=== Year-end charts ===
2022 year-end chart performance for 2 Alive
Chart (2022)	Position
US Billboard 200	169
US Top R&B/Hip-Hop Albums (Billboard)	61

== Certifications ==
Certifications for 2 Alive
Region	Certification	Certified units/sales
Poland (ZPAV)	Gold	10,000^{‡}
United States (RIAA)	Gold	500,000^{‡}
^{‡} Sales+streaming figures based on certification alone.
