= Talk (Yeat song) =

2022 single by Yeat

Single by Yeat

from the EP Lyfe
- Released: September 2, 2022
- Recorded: Before June 15, 2022
- Genre: Hip hop
- Length: 2:54
- Label: Field Trip; Listen to the Kids; Geffen; Interscope; Twizzy Rich
- Songwriters: Noah Olivier Smith; Benjamin Debosnigs Saint Fort
- Producer: Bnyx

Yeat singles chronology
"Rich Minion" (2022)	"Talk" (2022)	"Already Rich" (2023)

"Talk" is a single by American rapper Yeat, released through Field Trip Recordings, Listen to the Kids, Geffen Records, and Interscope Records as a single on September 2, 2022. The song serves as the lead single to Yeat's sixth extended play Lyfe, and found success after going viral on TikTok. In the United States, the song entered at number 42 on the Billboard Hot 100.

== Critical reception ==
Kieran Press-Reynolds of Pitchfork noted the song's harsh instrumentals and unnerving background vocals, writing: "Police sirens set a frantic scene, and then a shrieking synth catapults Yeat's flexes into the sky: "Head #1 up on these charts, we stuck or what?" Mangled background vocals creep like demonic backup singers shadowing Yeat's steady voice. Barely any other major label rap production in 2022 sounds as unhinged and off-kilter as this."

== Charts ==
Chart performance for "Talk"
Chart (2022)	Peak position
Canada (Canadian Hot 100)	55
Global 200 (Billboard)	85
Iceland (Tónlistinn)	31
Lithuania (AGATA)	58
South Africa Streaming (TOSAC)	63
US Billboard Hot 100	42

== Certifications ==
Certifications for "Talk"
Region	Certification	Certified units/sales
Canada (Music Canada)	Platinum	80,000^{‡}
Poland (ZPAV)	Gold	25,000^{‡}
United States (RIAA)	Platinum	1,000,000^{‡}
^{‡} Sales+streaming figures based on certification alone.
