= Bnyx =

American record producer

- Born: Benjamin Saint Fort; April 23, 1995 (age 31); Delaware, U.S.
- Origin: Upper Darby Township, Pennsylvania, U.S.
- Genres: Hip-hop; electronic; trap; rage; plugg; cloud rap
- Occupations: Record producer; rapper; songwriter
- Instruments: Ableton Live; guitar; synthesizer; keyboard; vocals
- Years active: 2018–present
- Labels: Lyfestyle; Field Trip; Capitol; Data Club
- Member of: Working on Dying

Benjamin Saint Fort (born April 23, 1995), known professionally as Bnyx (/bɛniː ˈɛks/, "Benny X", stylized in all caps), is an American record producer and songwriter. He is known for extensively working with Yeat and has also produced for many artists, such as Drake, Nicki Minaj, Lil Tecca, Travis Scott, YoungBoy Never Broke Again, Kid Cudi, Lil Uzi Vert and Quavo among others. Bnyx is a member of the Philadelphia-founded producer collective Working on Dying.

== Early life ==
Benjamin Saint Fort was born on April 23, 1995, in Delaware to Haitian immigrant parents. His stage name comes from his nickname, Benny, and the letter X, which he states "represents/stands for "Extreme". Extreme [...] is what I strive for whenever I create music". His older brother, Felix, influenced him to start officially producing music after he heard some of what he had done. His younger brother, Patrick, known professionally as BeautifulMvn, is also a record producer and the two often produce songs together. In 2017, Bnyx started working at AT&T after having to drop out of college because of financial difficulties, where he saw that Travis Scott had released a remix of "Swang" by Rae Sremmurd and decided to make his own remix, which ended up gaining traction after repeatedly tweeting the link to his remix while replying to users on Twitter.

== Career ==
=== 2017–2021: Career beginnings and Working on Dying ===
Bnyx started pursuing music at the age of nine as a hobby with his father. He'd watch music videos and interviews as he enjoyed the business side of the music industry. Later in Benny's life, he'd reach out to people regarding beats, but would soon help writing lyrics too.

In 2021, Bnyx joined the producer collective Working on Dying. 2021 was also the year he started working with Yeat, with Bnyx having production credits on the 4L mixtape, Trendi extended play, and the album Up 2 Me, all of which were released in 2021.

=== 2022–present: Commercial success and rise to fame ===
In 2022, he produced multiple songs on Yeat's September extended play Lyfe, including the Lil Uzi Vert collaboration "Flawlëss".

In February 2023, he helped produce 8 of the 22 songs on Yeat's third album AfterLyfe. On April 7, 2023, Drake released the single "Search & Rescue", in which Bnyx helped produce. On May 12, Bnyx was involved in the production of a song by Cochise, titled "Kaneki". On June 30, Bnyx was involved in the production of a song by Lil Uzi Vert from their third studio album, Pink Tape, titled "Aye" (featuring Travis Scott). On July 28, Travis Scott released his fourth studio album, Utopia, in which Bnyx helped produce the songs "K-pop" (with Bad Bunny and the Weeknd), "Sirens", and "Meltdown" (featuring Drake), with "K-pop" being released as the lead single from the album exactly one week before. On August 10, Yeat released his single, "Bigger Then Everything" in which Bnyx co-produced. Bnyx would have five production credits on Quavo's Rocket Power, released on August 18, 2023.

On September 15, Bnyx co-produced Lil Tecca's "Hvn on Earth" with Kodak Black as a single from his album, Tec. On the same day, BNYX co-produced Drake's "Slime You Out" featuring SZA. The track debuted at the #1 spot on the Billboard Hot 100, marking Bnyx's first chart-topping song. On September 22, Lil Tecca released his third studio album, Tec, in which Bnyx produced both "Yves" and "HVN on earth" (with Kodak Black). On October 6, Drake released his eighth studio album, For All the Dogs in which Bnyx helped produce eight songs: "Fear of Heights", "IDGAF" (featuring Yeat), "7969 Santa", "Slime You Out" (with SZA), "What Would Pluto Do", "All the Parties" (featuring Chief Keef), "Rich Baby Daddy" (featuring SZA and Sexyy Red), and "Away From Home". On November 10, The Kid Laroi released his debut studio album, The First Time, in which "I Thought That I Needed You" and "What Went Wrong???" were produced by him. On December 8, Nicki Minaj released her highly anticipated Pink Friday 2, on which Bnyx co-produced the twentieth cut of the album, "Blessings" featuring Tasha Cobbs Leonard. At the end of 2023, Bnyx was crowned the "Best Hip-Hop Producer Alive" of the year.

On January 12, 2024, production from Bnyx would be featured on four tracks off Kid Cudi's ninth studio album, Insano: "Most Ain't Dennis", "ElectroWaveBaby", "Funky Wizard Smoke", and "Porsche Topless". On February 1, Bnyx produced YoungBoy Never Broke Again's "Bnyx Da Reaper". In April, he signed a record deal with Lyfestyle Corporation, Field Trip Recordings, and Capitol Records in preparation for the release of his debut studio album. Bnyx would produce "Missing Everything" from YoungBoy Never Broke Again's seventh studio album, I Just Got a Lot on My Shoulders, released on December 6, 2024, and would later produce "Trap 101" and co-produce "GD Galaxy" from the rapper's third compilation, More Leaks, released on March 7, 2025.

On January 3, 2025, Bnyx alongside Atlanta rapper Benji Blue Bills and online streamer YourRAGE would release the collaboration "Aye Rage", which would later be the lead single to Bnyx and Benji's collaborative album, Out The Blue, released on May 30, 2025.

On October 24, 2025, BNYX released his first EP as an artist, Loading... as a prelude to his debut studio album Genesis FM, released on 15 May 2026 with a deluxe edition released 4 days after.

== Discography ==
=== Studio albums ===
- Genesis FM

=== Extended plays ===
- Loading...

== Production discography ==
=== Charted singles ===
List of singles as either producer or co-producer
Title	Year	Peak chart positions										Certifications	Album
Title	Year	US	US R&B/HH	US Rap	AUS	CAN	FRA	IRE	NZ	UK	WW	Certifications	Album
"Talk" (Yeat)	2022	42	—	—	—	55	—	—	—	—	85	RIAA: Gold; MC: Platinum	Lyfe
"Search & Rescue" (Drake)	2023	2	1	1	8	4	118	6	11	5	3		Non-album single
"K-pop" (Travis Scott, Bad Bunny, and The Weeknd)	2023	7	2	2	22	14	20	30	27	24	5		Utopia
"Meltdown" (Travis Scott featuring Drake)	2023	3	1	1	8	1	21	10	4	10	2	MC: Platinum	Utopia
"Bigger Then Everything" (Yeat)	2023	— (Note: "Bigger Then Everything" did not enter the Billboard Hot 100, but peaked at number seven on the Bubbling Under Hot 100 Singles chart.)	37	—	—	—	—	—	— (Note: "Bigger Then Everything" did not enter the NZ Top 40 Singles Chart, but peaked at number 16 on the NZ Hot Singles Chart.)	—	—		Non-album single
"Hvn on Earth" (Lil Tecca featuring Kodak Black)	2023	88	30	—	—	69	—	—	— (Note: "Hvn on Earth" did not enter the NZ Top 40 Singles Chart, but peaked at number 17 on the NZ Hot Singles Chart.)	—	—		Tec
"Slime You Out" (Drake featuring SZA)	2023	1	1	—	12	2	77	8	9	10	3		For All the Dogs
"Rich Baby Daddy" (Drake featuring SZA and Sexyy Red)	2023	11	4	3	11	18	152	20	9	10	16	BPI: Silver; RMNZ: Gold	For All the Dogs

=== Other charted and certified songs ===
List of songs as either producer or co-producer
Title	Year	Peak chart positions										Certifications	Album
Title	Year	US	US R&B/HH	US Rap	AUS	CAN	FRA	IRE	NZ	UK	WW	Certifications	Album
"Out the Way" (Yeat)	2022	— (Note: "Out the Way" did not enter the Billboard Hot 100, but peaked at number one on the Bubbling Under Hot 100 Singles chart.)	36	—	—	73	—	—	— (Note: "Out the Way" did not enter the NZ Top 40 Singles Chart, but peaked at number 25 on the NZ Hot Singles Chart.)	—	—	RIAA: Gold; MC: Platinum	Lyfe
"No More Talk" (Yeat)	2023	77	27	16	—	81	—	—	— (Note: "No More Talk" did not enter the NZ Top 40 Singles Chart, but peaked at number 17 on the NZ Hot Singles Chart.)	—	—		Afterlyfe
"Nun I'd Change" (Yeat)	2023	— (Note: "Nun I'd Change" did not enter the Billboard Hot 100, but peaked at number twenty-three on the Bubbling Under Hot 100 Singles chart.)	—	—	—	—	—	—	— (Note: "Nun I'd Change" did not enter the NZ Top 40 Singles Chart, but peaked at number 29 on the NZ Hot Singles Chart.)	—	—		Afterlyfe
"Aye" (Lil Uzi Vert featuring Travis Scott)	2023	31	11	7	—	44	—	68	— (Note: "Aye" did not enter the NZ Top 40 Singles Chart, but peaked at number 4 on the NZ Hot Singles Chart.)	93	54		Pink Tape and Utopia (Note: "Aye" was included on early versions of Utopia, including the vinyl release, but was excluded from the final version released on streaming.)
"Sirens" (Travis Scott)	2023	27	26	14	37	24	36	—	34	— (Note: "Sirens" did not enter the UK Singles Chart, as chart rules only allow three songs per artist to chart within the top one hundred at a time, but peaked at number 56 on the UK Streaming Chart.)	22		Utopia
"Hold Me" (Quavo)	2023	—	50	—	—	—	—	—	—	—	—		Rocket Power
"Fear of Heights" (Drake)	2023	10	9	7	22	8	90	—	28	— (Note: "Fear of Heights" did not enter the UK Singles Chart, as chart rules only allow three songs per artist to chart within the top one hundred at a time, but peaked at number 24 on the UK Streaming Chart.)	13		For All the Dogs
"IDGAF" (Drake featuring Yeat)	2023	2	2	2	6	1	25	9	6	5	1		For All the Dogs
"7969 Santa" (Drake)	2023	16	12	10	66	16	103	—	—	— (Note: "7969 Santa" did not enter the UK Singles Chart, as chart rules only allow three songs per artist to chart within the top one hundred at a time, but peaked at number 34 on the UK Streaming Chart.)	19		For All the Dogs
"What Would Pluto Do" (Drake)	2023	18	14	12	21	53	—	—	—	— (Note: "What Would Pluto Do" did not enter the UK Singles Chart, as chart rules only allow three songs per artist to chart within the top one hundred at a time, but peaked at number 47 on the UK Streaming Chart.)	24		For All the Dogs
"All the Parties" (Drake featuring Chief Keef)	2023	26	19	15	68	27	—	—	—	— (Note: "All the Parties" did not enter the UK Singles Chart, as chart rules only allow three songs per artist to chart within the top one hundred at a time, but peaked at number 61 on the UK Streaming Chart.)	30		For All the Dogs
"Away From Home" (Drake)	2023	32	23	19	99	33	—	—	—	— (Note: "All the Parties" did not enter the UK Singles Chart, as chart rules only allow three songs per artist to chart within the top one hundred at a time, but peaked at number 87 on the UK Streaming Chart.)	47		For All the Dogs
"I Thought That I Needed You" (The Kid Laroi)	2023	—	—	—	—	—	—	—	— (Note: "I Thought That I Needed You" did not enter the NZ Top 40 Singles Chart, but peaked at number 16 on the NZ Hot Singles Chart.)	—	—		The First Time
"Blessings" (Nicki Minaj featuring Tasha Cobbs Leonard)	2023	— (Note: "Blessings" did not enter the Billboard Hot 100, but peaked at number 22 on the Bubbling Under Hot 100 Singles chart.)	—	—	—	—	—	—	—	—	—		Pink Friday 2
"ElectroWaveBaby" (Kid Cudi)	2024	—	—	—	—	—	—	—	— (Note: "ElectroWaveBaby" did not enter the NZ Top 40 Singles Chart, but peaked at number 19 on the NZ Hot Singles Chart.)	—	—		Insano
"Wake Up F1lthy" (Playboi Carti and Travis Scott)	2025	52	25	23	87	55	—	—	— (Note: "Wake Up F1lthy" did not enter the UK Singles Chart, as chart rules only allow three songs per artist to chart within the top 100 at a time, but peaked at number 94 on the UK Streaming Chart.)	—	51		Music
"—" denotes a recording that did not chart or was not released in that territory.
