= Yeat =

American rapper (born 2000)

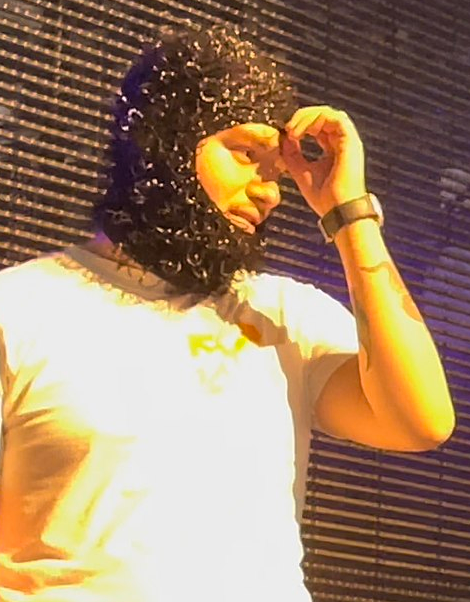
- Yeat performing in May 2022

Background information
- Also known as: Luh Geeky; Kranky Kranky; King Tonka; Purpose General
- Born: Noah Olivier Smith; February 26, 2000 (age 26); Irvine, California, U.S.
- Genres: Experimental hip-hop; trap; rage; cloud rap
- Occupations: Rapper; singer; songwriter; record producer; audio engineer
- Works: Discography
- Years active: 2015–present
- Labels: Geffen; Capitol; Field Trip; Empire; Interscope; Listen to the Kids; Lyfestyle
- Website: yeatofficial.com

Noah Olivier Smith (born February 26, 2000), known professionally as Yeat (/jiːt/ YEET; occasionally stylized in all caps as YEAT), is an American rapper, singer-songwriter, and record producer. He is known for his experimental sound—most notably the rage sound—unique vocabulary, and unconventional fashion sense, featuring a mix of designer brands and balaclavas.

Yeat rose to prominence in 2021 after the release of his mixtape 4L and debut studio album, Up 2 Me, with the latter's tracks "Money So Big" and "Get Busy" gaining considerable popularity on TikTok. In 2022, he released his second studio album, 2 Alive, and the EP Lyfe. Both debuted within the Billboard 200's top ten. In 2023, he released his third studio album, Afterlyfe, which debuted at number four on the chart, becoming his first album to reach the top five, and guest appeared on Drake's song "IDGAF"; the track debuted at number two on the Billboard Hot 100 and peaked atop the Global 200. In 2024, Yeat released his fourth and fifth studio albums: 2093 (in February) and Lyfestyle (in October). 2093 debuted at number two on the Billboard 200, while Lyfestyle debuted atop the chart, his first project to do so.

In 2025, Yeat released his second EP, Dangerous Summer, which topped at number 9 on the Billboard 200. In 2026, he released ADL, which charted at number 5, his seventh top-ten placement on the Billboard 200.

== Early life ==
Noah Olivier Smith was born on February 26, 2000, in Irvine, California. His mother, Laura (née Olivier) Smith, is Romanian, and his father, Joshua Smith, is an American of Mexican and British descent. Yeat's paternal grandmother is Mexican and from Tijuana; his paternal grandfather was Anglo-American. Yeat has two younger brothers. His father is also a musician who uses the name Beast Clouds. Yeat spent his early childhood in Fullerton, California, before he and his family moved to Portland, Oregon, where he attended Lakeridge High School in the nearby town of Lake Oswego. After high school, Yeat briefly moved to New York City before returning to the Greater Los Angeles area in pursuit of a music career.

== Career ==
=== 2015–2021: Career beginnings ===
Yeat began his career in 2015, originally making music under the name Lil Yeat, but these releases have since been deleted from the Internet. On June 30, 2018, Yeat made his first public appearance under his current moniker, premiering a track called "Brink" on Elevator, a YouTube channel. Yeat has said that he created the name Yeat while high and trying to come up with a word that sounded familiar. His stage name has also been described as a combination of "yeet" and "heat". Yeat has said that using LSD helped him pursue his career. He released his first mixtape, Deep Blue Strips on September 20, 2018. On February 21, 2019, the video for his track "Stay Up" premiered on Elevator.

=== 2021–2022: Viral success, Up 2 Me, and 2 Alive ===
Yeat achieved viral success on platforms such as TikTok in 2021. In Pitchfork, Mano Sundaresan wrote: "Cutting his teeth in the influential online rap collective Slayworld over the last few years, Yeat was always a little stranger than his peers, and consequently cast as a minor figure. But in 2021, his surrealist bent became his superpower." Yeat's music began to gain traction online after his mixtape 4L was released on June 11, 2021. 4L includes "Sorry Bout That" and "Money Twerk".

In August, Yeat released the EP Trendi, which had increased success with "Mad Bout That" and "Fukit". Also in August, a snippet of his song "Get Busy" went viral online, attracting considerable media and fan attention. The song was particularly noted for its line "this song already was turnt but here's a bell", which is immediately followed by the ringing of church bells (which often appear in his songs). Rappers Drake and Lil Yachty referenced the line.

On September 10, Yeat released his debut studio album, Up 2 Me, through a one-album deal with Interscope Records and Foundation Media. The album received generally good reviews from critics. After the limited Interscope and Foundation deal ended, Yeat fulfilled a promise he made to Zack Bia by signing with the latter's Field Trip Recordings, in addition to Conor Ambrose's Listen to the Kids, in a joint venture with Geffen Records and Interscope Records.

On January 22, 2022, Up 2 Me debuted on the Billboard 200, initially at number 183 and peaking at number 58. Later that month, Yeat teased a mid-February release date for his next album, 2 Alivë. His song "U Could Tell" was featured in the Euphoria episode "You Who Cannot See, Think of Those Who Can", which premiered on January 30.

On February 11, the single "Still Countin" was released alongside a Cole Bennett-directed video. On February 18, Yeat released his second studio album, 2 Alive, through Geffen Records, Field Trip Recordings, Listen to the Kids, and Twizzy Rich. It debuted and peaked at number six on the Billboard 200, selling around 36,000 units and becoming his highest-charting project. On April 1, the deluxe version of 2 Alive, 2 Alive (Geek Pack), was released. On April 29, he released "No Handoutz", a collaborative single with Internet Money Records.

On June 28, Yeat released "Rich Minion", a single he was commissioned to create for a Lyrical Lemonade-produced trailer promoting the film Minions: The Rise of Gru. After its release, the song became associated with "GentleMinions", a 2022 meme involving people who dress in formal attire and attend screenings of the film.

=== 2022–2024: Lyfe, Afterlyfe, 2093 and Lyfestyle ===
On September 2, 2022, Yeat released "Talk", a single from his EP Lyfe. The EP itself was released on September 9, debuting and peaking at number ten on the Billboard 200.

On February 24, 2023, Yeat released his third studio album, Afterlyfe. The album includes a feature from YoungBoy Never Broke Again, in addition to Yeat's alter egos Kranky Kranky and Luh Geeky. It peaked at number four on the Billboard 200 and number one on the Billboard Rap Albums chart. On May 3, Yeat released the single "Already Rich"; the song, often called by the unofficial name "ard up", was originally leaked in 2021 and saw minor success on social media apps such as TikTok. On May 26, the single "My Wrist" featuring Atlanta rapper Young Thug was released; this song notably features production by Pi'erre Bourne. On August 10, Yeat released the single "Bigger Then Everything" alongside a video directed by Cole Bennett. On October 6, Yeat was featured on Drake's track "IDGAF" from his album For All the Dogs; the song debuted at number two on the Billboard Hot 100, becoming his first top-ten entry on the chart and his first number one on the Billboard Global 200.

On February 16, 2024, Yeat released his fourth studio album, 2093, with features from Lil Wayne and Future and a guest appearance by Donald Glover on "Power Trip". 2093 debuted at number two on the Billboard 200. Its songs "Breathe" and "If We Being Real" went viral on social media platforms. The next day, 2093 (P2) was released. It has two bonus tracks. A couple days later, 2093 (P3) released exclusive to digital download with four bonus tracks. Yeat then featured on Glover's album Bando Stone & the New World.

In April 2024, Yeat confirmed that two more studio albums were coming out, Lyfestyle and A Dangerous Lyfe. Lyfestyle Corporation confirmed that Lyfestyle was set to release in October. The album was released on October 18, 2024, and debuted at number one on the Billboard 200, Yeat's first number-one debut.

=== 2025–present: Dangerous Summer and A Dangerous Lyfe ===
In March 2025, Pitchfork confirmed that Yeat and Don Toliver would release a collaborative album in 2025, alongside headlining the Summer Smash 2025 festival together on June 20. Pitchfork later deleted the album announcement. On July 18, 2025, Yeat released "I'm Yeat", the lead single on his seventh EP, Dangerous Summer. On August 1, 2025, Yeat released Dangerous Summer. On October 6, he made his runway debut at the Vetements SS26 show, alongside Ice Spice, Kelly Rutherford, and Michèle Lamy, among others. At ComplexCon, Yeat showcased his new Nike Air Max Goadome boot. On November 22, he debuted in Roblox in a collaboration with the game Dead Rails.

On February 26, 2026, Yeat and EsDeeKid to release their single "Made It on Our Own". On March 27, Yeat released ADL. On May 14, he was featured on "Fuëgo", the third and final lead single on Bnyx's debut studio album, GENESIS FM, alongside Bizarrap and Peso Pluma. On June 17, Yeat released "Million Dollar Minion", in promotion of Illumination Studios' movie Minions & Monsters. On October 15, 2026, Yeat was added to the popular battle royale game Fortnite. In the game, Yeat has his own skin and accessories. Additionally, his songs "Get Busy", "Money So Big", and "If We Being Real" were all added as jam tracks within the game. On October 23, 2026, Yeat released Luh Leakyz Vol. 1, which is described as a "grail tape" consisting of multiple fan-favorite unreleased tracks from his catalog. On November 4, 2026, Yeat joined JT, Katseye member Megan Skiendiel and Lunay in the Uggs "Gift of Feeling" campaign.

== Musical style ==
Yeat uses Auto-Tune-infused vocals. In 2021, he adopted a more aggressive and synth-based sound, joining a growing group of rappers who use "rage beats", a sound that became a SoundCloud staple influenced by EDM, Future, and Young Thug. Yeat has said the latter two are among his biggest inspirations. He also cited American rapper T-Pain as one of his biggest influences growing up, calling him "The GOAT of Auto-Tune". Yeat's signature vocal preset is based on a vocal chain given to him by his formerly frequent collaborator Weiland.

On 2093, Yeat uses a more futuristic and experimental sound, with elements of rage rap and electro.

Yeat has employed unique lingo, ad-libbing phrases such as "twizzy", "krank", and "luh geeky", and calling luxury SUVs "Tonka trucks" or "Tonkas". His father often made up words when Yeat was a child.

Certain aspects of Yeat's music have led him to be associated with various Internet memes and trends, especially his frequent use of bell sounds; in "Get Busy", he raps, "This song already was turnt but here's a bell", and bells ring for the rest of the track.

== Filmography ==
=== Video games ===
Year	Title	Role	Ref
2026	Fortnite Battle Royale	Himself (likeness)	

== Discography ==
Studio albums

- Up 2 Me (2021)
- 2 Alive (2022)
- Afterlyfe (2023)
- 2093 (2024)
- Lyfestyle (2024)
- ADL (2026)
