= Zack Bia =

American DJ (born 1996)

- Born: Zachary Chester Philippe Bialobos; June 9, 1996 (age 30); New York City, U.S.
- Occupations: DJ; record executive; record producer; socialite; club promoter
- Years active: 2015–present
- Title: Co-founder – Field Trip Recordings
- Musical career
- Genres: Electronic; EDM
- Labels: Field Trip; Geffen

Zachary Chester Philippe Bialobos (born June 9, 1996) is an American DJ, record executive, and record producer. In the late 2010s, he worked as a club promoter and DJ in Los Angeles. He later served as the opening DJ for Post Malone on the Twelve Carat Tour and held DJ roles on Drake's It's All a Blur Tour, Big as the What? Tour, and Anita Max Win Tour.

Bialobos is the co-founder of Field Trip Recordings, a record label that has signed artists including Yeat, Plaqueboymax, and producer BNYX. His work has involved music management and promotion within the hip-hop industry.

== Early life and education ==
Zack Bia was born in New York City. Bialobos was raised primarily by his mother after their parents' separation, first in New York City and later in Los Angeles, California, where she relocated for work. Bia has openly clarified misconceptions about his family background, explaining that his father, a photographer, was minimally involved in his upbringing, contrary to false rumors suggesting his father held a prominent role at Dior (Olivier Bialobos is the Director of Communications and Image for Christian Dior Couture and Parfums Christian Dior). Growing up, Bia credits his mother with exposing him to diverse cultural influences, encouraging his interests in music, skateboarding, and magazine culture from a young age. He attended Beverly Hills High School, graduating in 2014, and subsequently enrolled briefly at the University of Southern California, where he was member of the Lambda Chi Alpha fraternity.

== Career ==
=== Nightlife career (2015–2017) ===
In June 2015, while attending the University of Southern California, Bialobos visited a nightclub in Los Angeles for the first time on his 19th birthday. At the club, rapper Fetty Wap invited Bialobos and his friends to join him. At the end of the night, a club promoter mistakenly assumed Bialobos was part of Fetty Wap's group and requested his contact information. Following this, Bialobos began receiving regular invitations to the venue and subsequently started earning approximately $100 per event for promoting weekly gatherings to fellow USC students.

As his network expanded, Bialobos organized events attended by musicians, actors, and athletes. He later worked with John Terzian, co-founder of the H.Wood Group, to organize events at venues such as Delilah, where he became known for hosting private events with a no-photography policy.

In 2017, Bialobos met the musician Drake while hosting events. He later made a brief appearance in Drake's music video for "Money in the Grave" and was referenced in the song "No Stylist" by French Montana and Drake. His presence in entertainment circles was noted during an episode of Apple Music 1's The Zane Lowe Show, where the hosts remarked that Bialobos was frequently mentioned in Hollywood conversations.

=== Music and Field Trip Recordings (2018–present) ===
In early 2020, Zack Bia founded his record label, Field Trip Recordings, describing it as a natural progression from his involvement in Los Angeles' nightlife scene. Events organized by Bia were attended by emerging artists who later gained industry recognition and contacts. Field Trip Recordings was established to provide a formal platform for emerging artists introduced through Bia's events.

Rapper Yeat was among the initial artists signed by Bia to Field Trip Recordings. Bia discovered Yeat's music early, developing a close bond long before officially signing him. Yeat initially took a one-album distribution deal with Interscope in early 2021, pledging to join Field Trip Recordings upon completion of the agreement. Yeat later signed with Field Trip Recordings in partnership with Geffen Records. Under Field Trip, Yeat has received multiple RIAA certifications, including singles like "Out Thë Way", "Talk", and "Flawlëss", along with his albums 2 Alive and Lyfe. Yeat notably holds the distinction of having the most rap albums surpassing one billion streams this decade, marking significant success for Field Trip Recordings.

In 2020, during the COVID-19 pandemic, Bia hosted virtual DJ sets on Instagram Live, which gained notable viewership. These sessions featured appearances from various celebrities, including Kendall Jenner, Bella Hadid, Joan Smalls, Tinashe, Luka Sabbat, Virgil Abloh, and Drake, who debuted his single "Toosie Slide" during one of the streams.

In July 2023, Bia released his debut EP, Learn to Fly, showcasing collaborations with prominent artists such as Don Toliver, Lil Yachty, JID, 347aidan, and DJ Gummy Bear. The EP features collaborations across multiple subgenres. Bia stated that this debut marked his transition from behind-the-scenes work to releasing music under his own name.

Zack Bia's career as a DJ has included performances at multiple events and venues worldwide. He established a residency at Wynn Las Vegas in July 2021. He has performed at various music festivals, notably Lyrical Lemonade's Summer Smash Festival in Bridgeview, Illinois. In 2025, he performed DJ sets alongside headliners like Don Toliver, Yeat, Future, and Young Thug. Bia's DJ tours have also included supporting major artists such as Drake on his "It's All A Blur" tour.

== Collaborations and appearances ==
Bia appeared as himself in the basketball video game NBA 2K21.

In 2022, Bia teamed up with Asics for a GEL-KAYANO 14 collaboration to celebrate the launch of his independent record label, Field Trip Recordings.

Bia also collaborated with Beats by Dre to create a pair of speakers which say "past" and "present".

In April 2023, Bia promoted his collaboration with Nike alongside Field Trip Recordings and Verdy. The shoes have the Field Trip Recordings logo along with “Ch1” and “Ch2” on the left and right shoe respectively.

In 2026, Bia was announced as the commencement speaker for the USC Jimmy Iovine and Andre Young Academy.

In 2026, Bia was included on Billboard's Indie Power Players list as founder and CEO of Field Trip.

== Personal life ==
Collaborating with personal friends has been a consistent aspect of Bia's work. This is reflected in his relationship with director Cole Bennett, which he discussed in a video interview, noting the role of personal connections in creative projects.

In 2023, Bia worked with his brother, Elan Bia, on a multi-part video series that showed aspects of his daily life. The series included candid moments, creative projects, and everyday interactions.

Virgil Abloh served as an early mentor to Bia, highlighting the value of maintaining personal connections.

Public appearances and media coverage have connected him romantically with Madison Beer, Madelyn Cline, and Olivia Rodrigo.

== Field Trip Recordings ==
Field Trip Recordings, LLC
- Founded: April 25, 2017; 9 years ago
- Founder: James Canton; Zack Bia
- Distributor: Various
- Genre: Hip-hop; trap; pop; R&B
- Country of origin: United States
- Location: Los Angeles, California

Field Trip Recordings, LLC is an American record label originally founded on April 25, 2017, in Los Angeles by James Canton. Bia later joined as a co-founder in 2018. The label launched in 2020.

The label's roster includes rappers, producers, and singers such as Yeat, PlaqueBoyMax, Bnyx, Mallory Merk, SSGKobe, Slump6s and others. All are signed through joint ventures between the label and various major record companies.

=== Notable artists ===
Artists	Year signed	Releases (under the label)	Notes
Mallory Merk	2020	1	Jointly with Warner
SSGKobe	2020	2	Jointly with Columbia
Slump6s	2020	3	Jointly with Republic
Yeat	2022	3	Jointly with Capitol and Lyfestyle, formerly with Geffen, Listen To The Kids and Interscope
Zack Bia	2023	1	Jointly with Geffen
Bnyx	2024	1	Jointly with Capitol, Lyfestyle, and Data Club
PlaqueBoyMax	2025	2	Jointly with Capitol and 5$TAR
