= List of 2026 albums (July–December) =

The following is a list of albums, EPs, and mixtapes released in the second half of 2026. These albums are (1) original, i.e. excluding reissues, remasters, and compilations of previously released recordings, and (2) notable, defined as having received significant coverage from reliable sources independent of the subject.

For additional information about bands formed, reformed, disbanded, or on hiatus, for deaths of musicians, and for links to musical awards, see 2026 in music.

For information on albums released in the first half of 2026, see List of 2026 albums (January–June).

== Third quarter ==
=== July ===
List of albums released in July 2026
Go to: August | September | October | November | December | Unscheduled and TBA | Back to top
Release date	Artist	Album	Genre	Label	Ref.
July 3	Deep Purple	Splat!	Hard rock, heavy metal, progressive rock	Earmusic/Edel AG	
July 3	Ian Prowse	No Names		Learpholl Music	
July 3	Ken Carson	Xperiment	Rage, trap	Opium, Interscope	
July 3	L.A. Guns	Live from the Guild Theatre		Cleopatra	
July 3	Low Cut Connie	Livin in the USA		Contender Records	
July 3	Madonna	Confessions II	House, dance-pop, synth-pop	Warner	
July 3	Margo Price	Days of Unrest		Loma Vista	
July 3	Mary in the Junkyard	Role Model Hermit		AMF Records	
July 3	Moonspell	Far from God		Napalm	
July 3	Sienna Spiro	Visitor	Soul, symphonic pop	Capitol	
July 6	I-dle	We Made		Cube, Kakao	
July 8	Diamond*	Bling Slime Vøl 1: Høsted by DJ Holiday	Rage, trap	Atlantic, YSL	
July 10	Adam Lambert	Adam		The Orchard	
July 10	Allison Russell	In the Hour of Chaos	Americana	Fantasy	
July 10	Baby Rose	Yearnalism		Secretly Canadian	
July 10	Bring Me the Horizon	Count Your Blessings | Repented	Deathcore, melodic death metal, metalcore	Sony Music	
July 10	Chuck Strangers	Glory of the King's Hand		Lex	
July 10	December 10	On Your Side			
July 10	DevilDriver	Strike and Kill		Napalm	
July 10	The-Dream	Love/Hate II		Radio Killa, Republic	
July 10	Eva Under Fire	Villainous		Better Noise	
July 10	Finn Wolfhard	Fire from the Hip		AWAL	
July 10	Frost Children	Tweaker Poem	Hardstyle	RCA	
July 10	Future	The Real Me			
July 10	The Garden	Bootleg	Punk rock	Epitaph	
July 10	Hurry	Zoned Out		Lame-O	
July 10	Jack White	Frozen Charlotte		Third Man	
July 10	Kelela	New Avatar		Warp	
July 10	Kevin Atwater	Blush Red			
July 10	Kira Roessler	Enigma		Org Music	
July 10	Luluc	Sweet Thief		Community Music	
July 10	Ne-Yo	Highway 79		Compound Ent	
July 10	Panda Bear and Sonic Boom	A ? of When		Domino	
July 10	Parts & Labor	Set of All Sets		Ernest Jenning	
July 10	The Plot in You	The Plot in You		Fearless	
July 10	The Rolling Stones	Foreign Tongues		Polydor, Universal	
July 10	Sad13	1331		Exploding in Sound	
July 10	She's Green	Swallowtail		Photo Finish	
July 10	Show Me the Body	Alone Together		Loma Vista	
July 10	Slayr	Avant Nova	Rage, digicore, pop rap	Columbia	
July 10	Suki Waterhouse	Loveland		Island	
July 10	The Temper Trap	Sungazer		Mushroom Music, VMG	
July 10	Trickfinger	Rotation		Acid Test Records	
July 10	The Xcerts	I Think I Want to Go Home Now		FLG Records	
July 10	Xiu Xiu	Eraserhead Xiu Xiu		Polyvinyl	
July 10	Yeonjun	No Labels: Part 02		Big Hit Music	
July 12	Bella Kay	My Reckless Abandon		Atlantic	
July 14	Eartheater	Heavenly Body: If I'm the Bottle You're the Message		Chemical X Records	
July 14	Radkey	Bedroom Sand			
July 17	Aaron Lewis	Give My Country Back	Country	Big Machine	
July 17	As It Is	As It Is		FLG Records	
July 17	Boundaries	Yearning: The Unbeautiful After		Sumerian	
July 17	Brian Ennals and Blockhead	Boatshoes		Phantom Limb	
July 17	Buju Banton	Too Too Bad		VP	
July 17	Foreigner	In the Eye of the Storm		Sun, Virgin	
July 17	Fuming Mouth	The Ringing Bell			
July 17	Gin Wigmore	Beautiful Mess		Universal	
July 17	Gracie Abrams	Daughter from Hell		Interscope	
July 17	Haken	In a Fever Dream	Progressive metal	Inside Out	
July 17	Helado Negro and Reyna Tropical	Helado Tropical		Psychic Hotline	
July 17	Lenny Kaye	Goin' Local		Yep Roc	
July 17	Lido Pimienta	Caribenya		Anti	
July 17	Loathe	A Stranger to You		SharpTone	
July 17	The Menzingers	Everything I Ever Saw		Epitaph	
July 17	Motionless in White	Decades	Metalcore, melodic metalcore, alternative metal	Roadrunner	
July 17	Nia Archives	Emotional Junglist	Jungle, R&B, Britpop	Hijinxx, Island	
July 17	Niko Moon	Roots		Empire	
July 17	Protest the Hero	Within	Progressive metal		
July 17	Psycroptic	The Pulse of Annihilation			
July 17	Quicksand	Bring On the Psychics		Equal Vision	
July 17	Rick Ross	Set in Stone	Hip-hop	Maybach, Gamma	
July 17	Steve Lacy	Oh Yeah?	Rock, R&B, experimental	RCA	
July 17	Swapmeet	Mount Zero		Windspear	
July 17	Syd	Beard		Free Lunch Records, Warner	
July 17	Tesla	Homage		Frontiers	
July 17	Tory Lanez	Made You Think I Was Gone ...But	Hip-hop, R&B	One Umbrella Records	
July 17	Tricky	Different When It's Silent		False Idols Records	
July 17	Waylon Wyatt	Dustpiles		Music Soup, Darkroom	
July 17	Yard Act	You're Gonna Need a Little Music	Indie rock, post-punk revival, alternative rock	Island	
July 17	Yes	Live at Roosevelt Stadium, Jersey City, 17 June 1976		Rhino	
July 17	Zac Farro	Operator: Live in Studio		Congrats Records	
July 22	Lexie Liu	Pop Girls Club		Platoon	
July 23	Anitta	Equilibrium II		Floresta Records, Republic Records, Universal Music Latino	
July 24	Alex Cameron	Late to Set			
July 24	Alyssa Grace	Spilling My Guts		Artist House	
July 24	Avenged Sevenfold	Statica			
July 24	Baby Queen	I Hope You Don't Remember Me		Insanity	
July 24	Body Type	Tally	Power pop	P(doom), Poison City	
July 24	Brantley Gilbert	Sins of the Father		BBR	
July 24	Budjerah	Gentleman	R&B, pop, soul	Warner Music Australia	
July 24	Cakes da Killa and DJ Miss Parker	New Bitch			
July 24	Charles Wesley Godwin	Christian Name		Big Loud	
July 24	Charli XCX	Music, Fashion, Film	Pop, electronic rock	Atlantic	
July 24	Cypress Hill	Dios Bendiga	Hip-hop	Hybe Latin America	
July 24	Daphni	Hav U a Sec			
July 24	David Keenan	Dundalk to Dublin			
July 24	Heretic	Shape of Things to Come		Candlepower Records	
July 24	The Hu	Hun		Better Noise	
July 24	Ian Sweet	Shiverstruck		Polyvinyl	
July 24	Kirsten Morrell	Morrellium	Pop	KMR Records	
July 24	Madball	Not Your Kingdom	Hardcore punk	Nuclear Blast	
July 24	Mayday Parade	Sugar			
July 24	Nick Hakim	I Can See			
July 24	Portraits of Tracy	Q: From Where Do Our Primal Instincts Originate? A: MTV!			
July 24	The Revivalists	Get It Honest		Concord	
July 24	Rico Nasty	RX		Sugar Trap Records	
July 24	Robyn Hitchcock	The Confuser	Psychedelic rock	Tiny Ghost Records	
July 24	Shania Twain	Little Miss Twain	Country	Republic	
July 24	The Strokes	Reality Awaits	Art rock	RCA, Cult	
July 24	Tyla	A*Pop		Fax Records, Epic	
July 24	Waterparks	Jinx		BMG	
July 24	Willow	The Thread		Three Six Zero Recordings	
July 24	Zan/Cody	Beautiful 'n Damned		Frontiers	
July 28	Cheekface	Podium			
July 28	Shannon Lay	Past the Veil		All the Best	
July 30	Francisca Valenzuela	Maldita		Frantastic Records	
July 31	Allt	Ataraxia		Century	
July 31	Arca	XXXXX	Electronic, experimental, avant-garde	XL	
July 31	Ariana Grande	Petal	Pop, R&B	Babydoll, Republic	
July 31	Amy Shark	Soft Pop		Wonderlick, Sony Music	
July 31	Bear McCreary	The Singularity: Ekleipsis		Sparks & Shadows Records	
July 31	Cindy Blackman Santana	Coherence		Mack Avenue	
July 31	The Darling Buds	Same Sun / Same Sky	Indie pop	Cherry Red	
July 31	Davido	Oriadé	Afrobeats, R&B, amapiano	DMW, Sony Music	
July 31	Domi and JD Beck	Who Asked?		Apeshit Inc., Blue Note	
July 31	The Durutti Column	Renascent		London	
July 31	Ed Askew	The Final Painting		Drag City	
July 31	Five Finger Death Punch	Legacy		Better Noise	
July 31	Fred Again and Latin Mafia	9 Months & 50 Hours		Atlantic, Rimas	
July 31	Lil Uzi Vert	Maverick Almost Forever	Hip-hop, trap, rage	Cor(E), Roc Nation	
July 31	Lucia & the Best Boys	Picking Petals		Communion	
July 31	Opus Kink	The Sweet Goodbye		SO Recordings	
July 31	Pnau	Ahhcade		Etcetc	
July 31	R3hab	Dream Inside a Dream...		Island Berlin	
July 31	Shaboozey	The Outlaw Cherie Lee & Other Western Tales		American Dogwood, Empire	
July 31	Shearling	Don't Look at Me the Way a Dog Might Look at Your Leg		Mishap Records	
July 31	Shearwater	The New World		Polyborus, Secretly Distribution	
July 31	Terri Lyne Carrington + Social Science	Trip the Night Fantastic		Candid	
July 31	Tim Montana	Entire State of Tim Montana		BMG	
July 31	Tucker Wetmore	Sunburn Mixtape	Country pop	Back Blocks Music, Music Corporation of America	
July 31	Tyga	Starface		Last King, Empire	
July 31	Wyatt Flores	Scared of Heights		Island, MCA Nashville	

=== August ===
List of albums released in August 2026
Go to: July | September | October | November | December | Unscheduled and TBA | Back to top
Release date	Artist	Album	Genre	Label	Ref.
August 1	Stray Kids	SKZ-Replay 2026 Pt.1		JYP, Republic	
August 3	Red Velvet	Velvet Summer		SM, Kakao	
August 4	Fana Hues	Catch n' Release			
August 5	Jutes	Chin Up, Beautiful			
August 7	The Anchoress	As We Once Were		Last Night From Glasgow	
August 7	Bachelor Girl	Waiting for the Day: Artist Sessions			
August 7	Cancer Bats	Give Me Dirt		Marshall	
August 7	Casey Barnes	Made for This		Community Music	
August 7	Ceremony	Tell Me Your Dream		Relapse	
August 7	Charlie Worsham	Once Upon a Second Time Around			
August 7	Citizen	Halycon Blues		Run for Cover	
August 7	CKay	Banger Boy			
August 7	Coupdekat	Goodbye 2012!			
August 7	Don Walker	Love Songs			
August 7	Ela Minus and Nick León	Qué les pasó a mis amigos?		Smugglers Way, Domino	
August 7	Electric Callboy	Tanzneid			
August 7	Flo	Therapy at the Club	R&B, pop	Republic	
August 7	The Grascals	Not That Gone		Billy Blue Records	
August 7	Jamie Lenman	Puke			
August 7	John Carpenter	Cathedral		Sacred Bones	
August 7	Karol G	No Me Arrepiento de Sentir Tanto		Bichota Records, Interscope	
August 7	Man/Woman/Chainsaw	Cannonball		Fiction	
August 7	Margaret Glaspy	I Am Both		ATO	
August 7	The Mountain Goats	Days	Alternative rock, indie folk	Cadmean Dawn	
August 7	Overmono	Pure Devotion	UK garage, electronic, techno	XL	
August 7	Ravyn Lenae	Blue Island		Atlantic	
August 7	Role Model	Chuck Timely & the Hourglass			
August 7	Roy Montgomery and Martha Skye Murphy	Nebular		AD93	
August 7	Stray Kids	This & That	Hip-hop, electronic, pop	JYP, Republic	
August 7	Wave to Earth	Bad Pieces		Wavy International	
August 7	Xandria	Eclipse		Napalm	
August 10	KiiiKiii	WhyKiiiKiii		Starship, Kakao	
August 12	Ada Lea	The End Is a Wave		Saddle Creek, Next Door Records	
August 12	Smash Mouth	Mercury Comet			
August 14	Ashley Cooke	Ashley Cooke		Big Loud	
August 14	Ann Wilson and Tripsitter	Consecrated Ground			
August 14	Ayra Starr	Starrgirl		Mavin, Republic	
August 14	Babymorocco	The Summer Fables		Phatboy Records	
August 14	Becky G	Baraja Bendita		RCA	
August 14	Benny Blanco	Hermoso		Friends Keep Secrets	
August 14	Carly Simon	Comes in Waves	Pop	Iris Records	
August 14	Crawlers	Turn Off the TV		Nettwerk	
August 14	Dent May	The Big One		Carpark	
August 14	Elizabeth Cook	Great Television		Thirty Tigers	
August 14	Evil Island	Terraform the Afterlife		Blowed Out Records	
August 14	Getdown Services	Massive Champion		Breakfast Records	
August 14	GLU	Pony Boy		FLG	
August 14	Grace Cummings	Bloodhorse!		ATO	
August 14	Hovvdy	Big World		Arts & Crafts	
August 14	Icona Pop	Ritual		Ultra, Iconic Sound Recordings	
August 14	Internet Money	We All We Needed	Hip-hop	Internet Money, Mercury	
August 14	Jacob Alon	Live from the Roundhouse		Island, EMI	
August 14	James Ellis Ford	Lost in Another World		Domino	
August 14	Johanna Samuels	Sorry, Kid		Odd Man Out Records, Jealous Butcher Records	
August 14	Jon Batiste	Thelonious Monk: Monk Meditations (Batiste Piano Series, Vol. 3)		Verve	
August 14	Jon Batiste	Thelonious Monk: Monk Movements (Batiste Piano Series, Vol. 4)		Verve	
August 14	Joshua Bassett	Easier		Plush Records	
August 14	Judah & the Lion	I Am a Prism		Dualtone	
August 14	Jungle	Sunshine		AWAL	
August 14	Kate Miller-Heidke	The Kiss and the Abyss		EMI Australia	
August 14	Katseye	Wild		Hybe, Geffen	
August 14	King Gizzard & the Lizard Wizard	Alien Metal		P(doom)	
August 14	Kiwi Jr.	Blowin' Up		K, Perennial Records	
August 14	Laura Veirs	Temple Songs		Raven Marching Band Records	
August 14	Lindsay Lou	Bluegrass Women		Lindsay Lou	
August 14	L'Rain	Fata Morgana		Mexican Summer	
August 14	Lukas Graham	Good Times		Universal	
August 14	Marilyn Manson	One Assassination Under God – Chapter 2		Nuclear Blast	
August 14	Open Mike Eagle and Kenny Segal	Doomed!	Hip-hop	Backwoodz Records, Rhymesayers, Secretly Records	
August 14	Pat McAfee	The Diary of a Polarizing Figure			
August 14	Peking Duk	Paradise		Virgin	
August 14	Phoebe Bridgers	Lost Weekend		Dead Oceans	
August 14	Phil Jamieson	10Charlie			
August 14	Pinky Beecroft	Lonesome Wolf			
August 14	Racetraitor	Nobody, Son of Nobody		Another City	
August 14	Radiator Hospital	Distorting Time		Lame-O	
August 14	Raunchy	Prisoner		Mighty Music	
August 14	Sailor Honeymoon	The Worst of Sailor Honeymoon		Good Good 굿굿 Records, PIAS	
August 14	Saliva	Breaking Through		Judge & Jury	
August 14	The Script	The User's Guide to Being Human			
August 14	Sparks	Sparks Live on the Moon		Transgressive	
August 14	Sweeping Promises	You Say I Romanticize		Sub Pop	
August 14	Trippie Redd	NDA		10K Projects, 1400 Entertainment	
August 18	Kristin Hersh	Sugar on Blackstone		Fire	
August 18	Son Volt	Sound Signal Serenades	Alternative country, folk rock	Transmit Sound, Thirty Tigers	
August 19	Cornelius	Refractions		Eat Your Own Ears	
August 20	Cleo Sol	Gentlewoman			
August 21	The Afghan Whigs	Soft Control		Royal Cream, BMG	
August 21	Anthony Hopkins	Life Is a Dream		Decca	
August 21	Black Marble	Life in Small Spaces		Sacred Bones	
August 21	Brandon Flowers	Thrasher	Country, country western, Americana	Island	
August 21	Brennan Wedl	Brennan Wedl		Anti-	
August 21	Chelsea Wolfe	The Dark		Loma Vista	
August 21	Chris Pierce	Songs for the Heavy Hearted			
August 21	The Cramps	Gravest Gravy		Vengeance Records	
August 21	Crooked Colours	Dirt Road Gold		Sweat It Out	
August 21	Dan + Shay	Young		Warner Nashville	
August 21	Dark Funeral	A Beast to Praise		Century Media	
August 21	David Nail	Flowers			
August 21	Denzel Curry and Kenneth Blume	II	Hip-hop	Loma Vista	
August 21	DMA's	DMA's		Wonderlick Entertainment, Sony Music Australia	
August 21	Enhypen	The Sin: Bliss		Belift Lab	
August 21	The Game	The Documentary III	Hip-hop	Numinati, FTS Global Management	
August 21	Grace Potter	Trespasser		Thirty Tigers	
August 21	Ian Munsick	The Mountain Goat		West to the Rest Records, Triple Tigers Records	
August 21	Jam City	My World		Mad Decent	
August 21	Jorja Smith	What Are the Odds		FAMM Records	
August 21	Julia Holter	Materia		Domino	
August 21	Keb' Mo'	The Breakdown	Blues	Concord	
August 21	Lambchop	Punching the Clown	Folk, country, gospel	City Slang	
August 21	The Lazy Eyes	Cheesy Love Songs		AWAL	
August 21	Lexi Jayde	Lover Girl			
August 21	Miss Kaninna	Blackprint		Soul Has No Tempo, AWAL	
August 21	Mob Rules	Stories from the Verdant Vale		Roar	
August 21	Mystery Jets	A Hole to See the Sky Through		Fiction	
August 21	Nate Sib	Reborn		Republic, UMG	
August 21	No Joy	Big Life, Big Leaf		Hand Drawn Dracula, Sonic Cathedral	
August 21	Ocean Sleeper	Peace When I'm Dead		BMG Australia, Rise	
August 21	Paris Jackson	Happiest Day of My Life		Dragonflower Enterprises, Republic	
August 21	Paul Heaton	Jenius		EMI	
August 21	Ruth B.	Peace to Make			
August 21	Sam Smith	Hazel Eyes		Capitol	
August 21	Squirrel Flower	Say a Prayer to the Gods of Getting Going		Polyvinyl	
August 21	Sondre Lerche	Acrobats		PLZ Make It Ruins, VMG	
August 21	Stella Lefty	Long Way Home	Country pop, indie folk	Atlantic Outpost	
August 21	Vera Blue	Modern Rituals		Island Australia, Universal Australia	
August 21	Westside Cowboy	It Goes On	Indie rock, alternative country	Island	
August 21	Weezer	Weezer (Gold Album)		Reprise, Warner	
August 21	Wild Pink	Still Coming Down		Fire Talk Records	
August 21	Wolf Alice	The Clearing: B Sides			
August 23	The Awakening	The Lost Theatre		Intervention Arts	
August 24	NCT 127	Blingy		SM	
August 25	Busta Rhymes	Dillagence II	Hip-hop	The Conglomerate	
August 27	Andrew W.K.	Temptation to Exist			
August 28	Airbourne	Airbourne		Spinefarm	
August 28	Alabama Shakes	I Must Be Dreaming		Island	
August 28	Alex Warren	Wildchild	Pop	Atlantic	
August 28	Alicia Witt	Between Heaven and Earth			
August 28	Allah-Las	Sirenas			
August 28	Asher White	Love Aggregates		Joyful Noise	
August 28	Beartooth	Pure Ecstasy		Fearless	
August 28	Billy Strings	So Much for Goodbyes	Bluegrass	Reprise	
August 28	Carly Pearce	Honest Woman		BBR Music Group, BMG	
August 28	Colorblind	Who Sold You This Truth ++ Was It Yours to Hold		Solid State	
August 28	Cosmic Country	Ryman to Robert's		Retrace Music	
August 28	Czarface and Frankie Pulitzer	Czarface Meets Frankie Pulitzer			
August 28	Dinosaur Jr.	There Near	Alternative rock, indie rock	Jagjaguwar	
August 28	Engelbert Humperdinck	Faithfully		Cleopatra	
August 28	Erykah Badu and the Alchemist	Before the World Blows		Control FREAQ Records, Young	
August 28	Everlast	Embers to Ashes		Martyr Inc Records	
August 28	Exumer	Death Mask Messiah		Metal Blade	
August 28	Floating Points	Mere Mortals		Deutsche Grammophon	
August 28	Flotsam and Jetsam	Rats in the Temple		Napalm	
August 28	Flowerovlove	Mini Skirt Warrior		Capitol	
August 28	Graham Hunt	American Pyramid		Run for Cover	
August 28	Headie One	MMM		One Records Limited	
August 28	Holding Absence	Modern Life Is Lonely		Sumerian	
August 28	Interpol	This Mirror Weighs a Ton		Partisan	
August 28	In This Moment	Witch		Better Noise	
August 28	The Jayhawks	Sanctuary Park		Thirty Tigers	
August 28	Jem Cassar-Daley	Tattoos Used to Come Off in the Pool		Jem Cassar-Daley, Civilians	
August 28	Jennie	Fallen Angel		Odd Atelier, Columbia	
August 28	Jim James	Wowed Out		ATO	
August 28	Kamelot	Dark Asylum		Napalm	
August 28	Ladrones	Arriba la L		Rise	
August 28	Lancey Foux	The Time of Our Lives			
August 28	Lauren Alaina	Stages		Big Loud	
August 28	Le Ren	Don't Be Funny Without Me			
August 28	The Linda Lindas	Gotta Get Out		Reprise	
August 28	Little Big Town	It's a Dying Art		MCA Nashville	
August 28	Mama's Broke	Reunion		Free Dirt, Forward Music	
August 28	Mastodon	Marrow Deep	Progressive metal, sludge metal, stoner metal	Loma Vista	
August 28	Mike D	Thank You		Capitol	
August 28	Prince	Timeless		NPG, Legacy	
August 28	Rod Wave	Don't Look Down	Hip-hop	Alamo	
August 28	Russian Circles	Nine		Sargent House	
August 28	Sara Bareilles	Good Grief		Epic	
August 28	Sarah Davachi	The Will of Tongues		Late Music	
August 28	Saul Williams	Leap Life			
August 28	Steve Hackett and Steve Rothery	The Roaring Waves		InsideOut	
August 28	Tiny Habits	Keepers		Mom + Pop	
August 28	Ty Segall	Chrome		Drag City	
August 28	The Warning	Everything's Falling	Alternative rock	Lava, Republic	
August 31	Taemin	Phase 1: Soft Violence		Galaxy Corporation	

=== September ===
List of albums released or to be released in September 2026
Go to: July | August | October | November | December | Unscheduled and TBA | Back to top
Release date	Artist	Album	Genre	Label	Ref.
September 1	Yeah Yeah Yeahs	Hidden in Pieces Live at the Royal Albert Hall			
September 2	LP	Room 12			
September 2	SiM	Hooman After All		UNFD	
September 3	Sleep	Hempispheres	Doom metal, stoner metal, space rock	Third Man	
September 4	156/Silence	From a Distance		Pure Noise	
September 4	Accept	Teutonic Titans 1976–2026		Napalm	
September 4	Adéla	Prima		Capitol	
September 4	Amelie Lens	Aura		Exhale	
September 4	Angus & Julia Stone	Karaoke Bar		Virgin	
September 4	Arab Strap	Half-Told Tales		Rock Action	
September 4	Audrey Horne	Achilles		Napalm	
September 4	Behemoth	I, Scvlptor		Massacre	
September 4	Bleeker	Elephant		Known Accomplice	
September 4	Carmen Villain	Memoria		Smalltown Supersound	
September 4	Chat Pile	Who Loves the Sun	Noise rock	The Flenser	
September 4	Corto.alto	Some Small Fortune			
September 4	The Cranberries	The Cranberries: Live at the London Astoria II, 1994		Island, UMe	
September 4	Devil Master	Bloody Dreams		Relapse	
September 4	Dexys Midnight Runners	Love		Heavenly	
September 4	Ellie Goulding	I Know Too Much		Polydor	
September 4	Faux Real	Poison Time		b4	
September 4	Immersion	What Is Lost Will Return		Swim	
September 4	Jamie Webster	Running Round the Sun		Modern Sky	
September 4	Johnny Foreigner	Forwards!		Alcopop!	
September 4	Judiciary	Stalagmite Angels		Closed Casket Activities	
September 4	Kasabian	Act III		Sony Music	
September 4	Liana Flores	And So It Goes...		Fiction, Verve	
September 4	Lily Seabird	Lightspheres on the Way		Lame-O	
September 4	Linda Sikhakhane	Linda		Blue Note	
September 4	Lulu	Let the Girl Sing Out		The Orchard	
September 4	Mad Max	Stories of Destiny		Roar Records, Reigning Phoenix	
September 4	The Mars Volta	Lucro Sucio; Unfinished Business			
September 4	Matilda Mann	Kismet			
September 4	Medium Build	King of Having Fun			
September 4	Melissa Auf der Maur	Bass Womb Room: My '90s 4-Track Demos x Field Recordings			
September 4	Mick Harvey and Amanda Acevedo	Psychedelia in White			
September 4	Movements	Happier Now		Fearless	
September 4	Mykki Blanco	Cafe Paradiso			
September 4	Natalie Imbruglia	Algorithm		Landgirl Records	
September 4	Nemzzz	Locked In			
September 4	A Night in Texas	The Darkest Side of Humanity		Unique Leader Records	
September 4	Paris Paloma	The Fatal Flaw		Nettwerk	
September 4	Personal Trainer	Human Assholes		Bella Union	
September 4	President	Blood of Your Empire		Atlantic	
September 4	Rebecca Black	Age of the Exhibitionist	Dance-pop		
September 4	Ricky Warwick	Fire & Vengeance		Earache	
September 4	Røry	Bloodletting	Alternative rock, metalcore	Sadcøre Records	
September 4	Sam Tompkins	Are We Gonna Sing?		Island	
September 4	Showing Teeth	A Fate Worse Than Loneliness EP		Republic, Spinefarm	
September 4	Sigh	Goh-ka		Peaceville	
September 4	Simona Castricum	Villain		Trans-Brunswick Express	
September 4	Slaughter & the Dogs	White Heat		Cadiz Music	
September 4	Sofie Royer	Before/After		Stones Throw	
September 4	Theory of a Deadman	Part 1: Funeral Songs		ONErpm	
September 4	The Thermals	Under Crushing Rain			
September 4	Told Slant	What's Up		Mtn. Laurel Recording Co.	
September 4	Venbee	Back to the Drawing Board			
September 4	Willie J. Healey	143		V2	
September 9	Almost Monday	Thank God It's Almost Monday		Hollywood	
September 9	Sega Bodega	Live & Altared			
September 9	TTSSFU	Blown Again		Partisan	
September 10	Brian Fallon	Not Bad for New Jersey			
September 10	Stabbing Westward	Wither Rewired			
September 11	Bloc Party	Anatomy of a Brief Romance	Indietronica, indie rock	Contagious LTD, VMG	
September 11	Bonobo	Distance in Static		Ninja Tune	
September 11	Boy Harsher	Get Mean		Atlantic	
September 11	Buddy Miller	Buddy Miller			
September 11	Candi Carpenter	Reincarnation			
September 11	Colin Stetson and Brìghde Chaimbeul	All the Light in the World		Envision Records	
September 11	Green Lung	Necropolitan		Nuclear Blast	
September 11	Haruomi Hosono	Yours Sincerely		Ghostly International	
September 11	Ibibio Sound Machine	Chopping Mountain		Merge	
September 11	Jhené Aiko	Westside Whimsy		Def Jam, ArtClub	
September 11	Pokey LaFarge	Rent Money		Boxer Boy Records	
September 11	Pretty Sick	Anarchy		Dirty Hit	
September 11	The Proclaimers	You May Offend			
September 11	Rio da Yung OG	The World Is Yours		M.I.N.E. Ent., Empire	
September 11	Scene Queen	Metalicious		Hopeless	
September 11	Shudder to Think	Who Sent You?		Dischord	
September 11	Sorcha Richardson	Draw the Outline			
September 11	Standing on the Corner	SOTC ("II")		XL	
September 11	Sylvan Esso	Ow ∞	Electropop, indietronica	Psychic Hotline Records	
September 11	Texas Hippie Coalition	Stoned Cowboys	Heavy metal	Bigdadrecords, Vanity Music Group	
September 11	This Is Lorelei	The Singer in My Band	Alternative country, folk rock	Matador	
September 11	The Tubs	Hard Life		Merge	
September 11	Tygers of Pan Tang	Electrifyed		Mighty Music	
September 12	Alan Davey	Astrolabes and Sunstones		Savant Guarde Records	
September 18	Actress	Radical Frame		Ninja Tune	
September 18	Agnes Obel	The Meaning of Flowers		Deutsche Grammophon	
September 18	Anthrax	Cursum Perficio		Nuclear Blast, Megaforce	
September 18	AZ Chike	No Rest for the Wicked		Warner	
September 18	Babehoven	I See Them, I See Me		Double Double Whammy	
September 18	Beabadoobee	Pylon	Indie rock	Dirty Hit, Interscope	
September 18	Bea Miller	Mr. Peaked in High School			
September 18	Beck	Ride Lonesome		Capitol	
September 18	Bonnie 'Prince' Billy	Ghosts of American Psychonauts			
September 18	Briston Maroney	Normal Heights			
September 18	Carly Rae Jepsen	Day and Night		Interscope	
September 18	Cartel	Learning How to Cope		Field Day Records	
September 18	Chaka Khan	Chakzilla		BMG	
September 18	Chasing Abbey	Cyber Celt			
September 18	C.O.F.F.I.N	Out in Oslo		p(doom) records	
September 18	Daley	Strange Nature	R&B	TEXX7, SRG/ILS	
September 18	Dave Stewart	The Way It Was Back Then		Bay Street Records	
September 18	Dragonflies (Nigel Godrich and Dhani Harrison)	Dragonflies		Dark Horse, BMG	
September 18	Echo & the Bunnymen	Apples for Isaac		BMG	
September 18	Emma Ruth Rundle	These Killing Times		Errant Child Records	
September 18	Empress Of	Dream House		Giant Music	
September 18	Ezra Collective	Here Because of Hope		Partisan	
September 18	Feid	El Green Print: La Saga (Disc 2) – El Club de las 19 Flores		Grabaciones Los Poderosos, UMLE	
September 18	For King & Country	The Most Beautiful Colours		Word	
September 18	Frankie Rose	Hila		Born Losers Records, Night School Records	
September 18	Freak Slug	Amulet		Future Classic	
September 18	Gary John Barden	Empowered Emotions		Frontiers	
September 18	Gayle	Observing Chaos		Atlantic	
September 18	Gia Ford	A Room Within a Room		Chrysalis	
September 18	Grateful Dead	Summer Magic 1985	Rock	Rhino	
September 18	The Homesick	What's Up with All These Shangri-Las?		Siluh Records	
September 18	Honey Revenge	Loving and Losing		Thriller	
September 18	Huddy	Somebody to Hate		Half Blood Records	
September 18	Jake Xerxes Fussell	The Old Beloved Path		Fat Possum	
September 18	Kai Hansen	Born with a Hammer			
September 18	Katie Pruitt	Fools for the Fleeting		Rounder	
September 18	Krallice	Scour Order		Profound Lore	
September 18	Like Moths to Flames	Does Heaven Ever Mourn for Me		UNFD	
September 18	Lizzy McAlpine	Angel		RCA	
September 18	Luke Bryan	Signs		Capitol Nashville	
September 18	The Mary Wallopers	Paddywhackery			
September 18	Miley Cyrus	Bass Persuades		Atlantic	
September 18	Neil Young and the Chrome Hearts	Second Song		Reprise	
September 18	Nicole Atkins	Drama		Sun, Wicked Game Records	
September 18	Nonpoint	The Last Word		361 Degrees Records	
September 18	Now It's Overhead	In the Beginning		Saddle Creek	
September 18	O.A.R.	Three Tinted Windows		Ineffable Records	
September 18	Orville Peck	Mule		Warner	
September 18	Onelinedrawing	Rainbowmachine		Iodine	
September 18	Pete Roth Trio	Group Chat		Winterfold Records	
September 18	Plush	Mass Hysteria		Pavement Entertainment	
September 18	Rhiannon Giddens	Hope Is the Thing with Feathers		Nonesuch	
September 18	Rakim, Kurupt, Masta Killa	The Godbody LP		Team League Entertainment	
September 18	Riley Green	That's Just Me		Nashville Harbor	
September 18	Rodrigo y Gabriela	OurHome		ATO	
September 18	Roger Taylor	Violence Insane in a Beautiful World		Nightjar Productions, Columbia	
September 18	Seasick Steve	The Last Season of America		Eastcote Recordings	
September 18	Seth MacFarlane	Seth MacFarlane Sings the Muppets		Verve, Republic	
September 18	Slothrust	What They Grow in the Garden		Equal Vision	
September 18	Slow Pulp	Melodie		Anti-	
September 18	Son Lux	Out Into		City Slang, This Is Meru	
September 18	De Staat	De Staat		V2	
September 18	Susanna Hoffs	The List		Baroque Folk Records	
September 18	Team Dresch	Furthermore		Jealous Butcher Records	
September 18	Tove Lo	Estrus		Pretty Swede Records	
September 18	Triggerfinger	Tarmac		Sony Music	
September 18	Uncle Acid & the Deadbeats	Shapes of Midnight		Killer Candy Records	
September 18	Wasia Project	Nocturne			
September 18	Winter	Romantix Mixtape		Winspear	
September 18	Yeat	Cocoon		Lyfestyle Corporation, Field Trip, Capitol	
September 21	Jesus Jones	Twilight			
September 22	PFR	Target and the Arrow		PFR	
September 23	Jam City	My World		Mad Decent	
September 23	Lemfreck	Cyrogenics		Noctown	
September 25	Adult DVD	Adult DVD		Fat Possum	
September 25	AJJ	Dirty Old Power		AJJ Unlimited LTD, Specialist Subject Records	
September 25	Ax and the Hatchetmen	Stick & Poke		Arista	
September 25	Azure Ryder	Even Flowers Can Bruise		Community Music	
September 25	Benny Sings	22 Durnham Dew		Stones Throw	
September 25	Blawan	Gi Mi Keys Back / Auto Fake		XL	
September 25	Blondshell	Violins	Alternative rock	Partisan	
September 25	Bullion	Nearly		Ghostly International	
September 25	The Calling	Before the World Turns to Dust		TLG Rock, Virgin	
September 25	Can	Live in Arles 1975		Mute, Future Days	
September 25	Cara Delevingne	Not Normal		Warner	
September 25	Claire Rousay and Martyna Basta	Hotel Room		Unsound	
September 25	Cloven Hoof	Never a Prophet in Your Own Land		High Roller Records	
September 25	Coldrain	Optimize = Optdemise		Century Media	
September 25	Crown Magnetar	The Hollowing of Godflesh		Unique Leader Records	
September 25	Dylan Gossett	Ramblin'			
September 25	Europe	Come This Madness		Silver Lining Records, Hell & Back Recordings	
September 25	Gilla Band	Pugnello		Rough Trade	
September 25	Godflesh	Decay	Industrial metal	Relapse	
September 25	Hermanos Gutiérrez	Los Ojos del Cóndor		Easy Eye Sound	
September 25	Ian Noe	Canyon Falls Trailer Band		Thirty Tigers	
September 25	Jae Stephens	Audacity	R&B, pop	Def Jam, Raedio	
September 25	Joy Oladokun	Hope Is a Heavy Thing		Concord	
September 25	Julia Jacklin	The Gem	Indie folk, indie pop	4AD, Remote Control	
September 25	Kenny Chesney	Silver Sands Marina		Hey Now Records	
September 25	Lacrimas Profundere	Lay Me Down O Silent Fear		Steamhammer	
September 25	Leon Bridges	Happiness Anytime			
September 25	Lizz Wright and Kenny Banks Sr.	Nearness		Blues & Greens Records, Candid	
September 25	M83	I Wrote You a Letter		Other Suns Records	
September 25	Mary Gauthier	Reckoning		Soundly Music, Thirty Tigers	
September 25	Metalite	Discovery	Power metal	Reigning Phoenix Music	
September 25	Ms. Rachel	I'm So Happy		Magic Star Records, The Orchard	
September 25	Nessa Barrett	Tough Love	Pop rock	Warner	
September 25	Nothing but Thieves	Stray Dogs		RCA, Sony Music	
September 25	The Ocean	Solaris	Post-metal, progressive metal, sludge metal	Pelagic Records	
September 25	Oren Ambarchi	Cooked		Drag City	
September 25	Pain of Truth	Pain of Truth		Daze Records	
September 25	Paul Laine	The Long Road Back		Frontiers	
September 25	Peter Hammill	Tears in Time		Esoteric Antenna	
September 25	Protomartyr	Hotel Usona		Domino	
September 25	Sensible Soccers	Camminando di Notte		8mm Records	
September 25	Soft Cell	Danceteria		Republic of Music	
September 25	Son Lux	Your Mother Your Mother Your Mother		Waxwork	
September 25	Space Afrika	Quiet Storm		Dais	
September 25	Starcleaner Reunion	Umbrella		Take Care Records	
September 25	Stornoway	Beyonder		Cooking Vinyl	
September 25	Stryper	Throne of Thorns		Frontiers	
September 25	Tinashe	Popstar	Pop	Nice Life, Atlantic	
September 25	Tom Morello	Everyone Gets Everything They Want		Mom + Pop	
September 25	Uche Yara	Bodyscanner		Goldendays FM	
September 25	Wade Bowen	The Version of Me You Get	Texas country	Thirty Tigers	
September 25	Warren Zeiders	No Brakes		Warner	
September 25	Weakened Friends	Live from Hell		Don Giovanni	
September 25	Wheeler Walker, Jr.	Pullin' Out			
September 25	The Wolfgang Press	Asylum Variations		Downwards	
September 25	The Yummy Fur	Everybody Talks About the Weather		Upset the Rhythm	
September 28	Klein	My Own Fairytale		Parkwuud Entertainment	

== Fourth quarter ==
=== October ===
List of albums to be released in October 2026
Go to: July | August | September | November | December | Unscheduled and TBA | Back to top
Release date	Artist	Album	Genre	Label	Ref.
October 1	Pabllo Vittar	Lost in Lust		The Orchard	
October 1	Quadeca	Life 1		X8 Music	
October 2	The Album Leaf	A Body of Voices		Nettwerk	
October 2	Amon Amarth	The Allfather Awakens		Metal Blade	
October 2	Blossoms	Songs from the Wedding Cake		ODD SK, Distiller Records	
October 2	Brymir	What We Leave Behind	Melodic death metal, symphonic death metal	Napalm	
October 2	Butcher Babies	Nightbloom		Judge & Jury	
October 2	Dead Poet Society	Monarch		Spinefarm	
October 2	Deerhoof	Divine Schism			
October 2	Dexter and the Moonrocks	Friends That I Don't Like		Severance Records, Big Loud Rock	
October 2	Ella Hooper	Overnight Success	Ella Hooper, MGM		
October 2	Escape the Fate	The Last Goodbye		Big Noise	
October 2	The Fall	Post Script		Cog Sinister	
October 2	Fat Dog	Cancel Me (I'm Tired)		Domino	
October 2	Gavin Adcock	The Day I Hang It Up		Thrivin Here, Warner Nashville	
October 2	Ghostkid	Follow the White Rabbit		Century Media	
October 2	Greg Freeman	All Set the Bone		Transgressive, Canvasback	
October 2	Imminence	Axis Mundi	Metalcore	Sumerian	
October 2	Johnny Marr	The Age of Everything		New Voodoo, BMG	
October 2	Kaitlyn Aurelia Smith	Ruin: It's Not Just Music		Someone Special	
October 2	Kavus Torabi	October by Name		Believers Roast	
October 2	Kodaline	We Were Only Young		Concord	
October 2	Kyle Gordon	Kyle Gordon Is Everywhere		BMG	
October 2	Lee Brice	Sunriser		Curb	
October 2	Lenny Kaye	Riot on Oxford Street		IN.2 Records	
October 2	Logic1000	Confirmation!		Therapy, Because Music	
October 2	Marguerite	Guérir			
October 2	Master Peace	If I Don't Love You, Who Will?			
October 2	Meshell Ndegeocello	Synonym		Blue Note	
October 2	Miranda Lambert	Crisco	Country pop	Music Corporation of America	
October 2	Miss May I	No Place for Me	Metalcore	Solid State	
October 2	Montell Fish	Nest			
October 2	Of Virtue	Death of the Altar		Arising Empire	
October 2	The Paradox	Proceed with Caution			
October 2	Paul Weller	In the Shadow of the Sun, Paul Weller & Band Live & Very Direct			
October 2	Quavo	Qrömelife		Quality Control	
October 2	Soul Wun	Kaleidoscope		Gallery Recordings	
October 2	Spike Fuck	Evidence		Sacred Bones	
October 2	Sponge	Recuerda Tu Muerte		Three One Three Records	
October 2	Stef Chura	Dancing Alone on the Concrete		Saddle Creek	
October 2	Susanne Sundfør	Revelations of Divine Love		Bella Union	
October 2	To the Grave	Liberation Front		BlkIIBlk	
October 2	Twin Atlantic	Separation from the Animals			
October 2	Vacations	Pursuit of Anything		Nettwerk	
October 2	Vanishing Twin	Archives		Fire	
October 2	Victoria Monét	Frequency of Love	R&B	Lovett Music, RCA	
October 2	Way Dynamic	Massive Shoe		Jagjaguwar	
October 2	Wishy	Nature's Pill			
October 2	Wynonna Judd	The Hard Truth		Anti-	
October 5	Joe Hendry	Beyond Belief			
October 5	Manchán Magan	Slí na Samhaíochta (The Way of Imagination)		Claddagh	
October 8	Pitbull	Pitcoin			
October 9	Basht.	Poor Advice		LAB	
October 9	Bodega	All Inside Aquarium		Chrysalis	
October 9	Calla	De Facto		Nuevo Leon Recordings	
October 9	Cameron Winter	Live at Carnegie Hall	Folk	Partisan, PIAS	
October 9	Chase & Status	Generic Everything		Warner	
October 9	Chloe Slater	Riot Youth			
October 9	Claire Cronin	The Bruise		Orindal Records	
October 9	Claire Rousay	On Holding		Quality Sounds Ltd	
October 9	Dan Croll	Winning Streak			
October 9	Danielle Ponder	Everything Has Changed		Dead Oceans	
October 9	Dawn Richard	Creole Culture		Merge	
October 9	Death Valley Girls	Welcome to Earth		Suicide Squeeze Records	
October 9	Enuff Z'Nuff	Live at the Whisky A Go-Go		Cleopatra	
October 9	Fatima Al Qadiri	3TWI (عتوي)		Hyperdub	
October 9	Fola	9		Dangbana Republik Records, Empire	
October 9	Gabriella Cilmi	Pure Love			
October 9	Gayance	Roaming		Tru Thoughts	
October 9	Girl Ultra with Chromeo	RRRomeo		Big Dada	
October 9	Graveyard	Fever			
October 9	Greta Van Fleet	Palace for the People		Republic	
October 9	HAAi	Digitise		Mute	
October 9	Hatesphere	Guillotine		Scarlet	
October 9	Imperial Teen	All Over You		Merge	
October 9	Jamie T	Ghosts (100 Days of Morning)		Polydor	
October 9	Jess Williamson	A Mile South of Heaven		New West	
October 9	Joyce Wrice	Machiko		BMG	
October 9	Laura Cortese	Lucky Water		Compass	
October 9	Left to Suffer	Unwelcome Guest		Hopeless	
October 9	Love Is Noise	The Space Between Happiness and Heartache		Bloodblast	
October 9	Lucy	Citizen's Arrest			
October 9	Margo Cilker	Little White Cross		Fossil Records	
October 9	Marina Herlop	Dja Dja			
October 9	Ovrkast	Striking		Three Times Louder	
October 9	Pet Shop Boys	A Man from the Future		Parlophone	
October 9	The Pineapple Thief	Far and Wide		Inside Out	
October 9	Queen of Jeans	Hard/Sweet		Memory Music	
October 9	Remi Wolf	Mud	Pop rock	Island	
October 9	Sheryl Crow	Pick You Up		Big Green Barn Productions, Thirty Tigers	
October 9	Selfish Things	Receptivity		FLG	
October 9	The Tallest Man on Earth	Just Beyond Endless Mountain		Anti-	
October 9	Teenage Fanclub	Do Not Dare to Dream			
October 9	Todd Snider	My Second Rodeo		Aimless, Inc., Thirty Tigers	
October 9	Troye Sivan	She's the Best		Interscope	
October 9	Tungsten	Ashes	Industrial metal, power metal	Perception	
October 9	Twin Temple	Doomed Lovers		Pentagrammaton Records	
October 9	Wage War	Landfall		Fearless	
October 11	Chris Gantry	Worth Every Nail		Appalachia Record Co.	
October 12	NCT Wish	I Spy		SM	
October 15	Lords of Acid	Mundo Bizarro		Metropolis	
October 16	@	Autosmile	Psychedelic folk	4AD	
October 16	Andy Grammer	Big Stupid Heart		S-Curve, Hollywood	
October 16	Angèle	Instinct		Angèle VL Records, Sony Music	
October 16	Antoni O'Breskey	A Wild Inhabitation			
October 16	The Avalanches	No Bad Memories		Modular	
October 16	Bibio and Dorian Concept	Answers		Warp	
October 16	Blind Illusion	Stage Flight: Live at the UC Theatre		Hectic Records, Bleeding Priest Records	
October 16	Brian Kennedy	How Can I Keep from Singing			
October 16	Caspian	Caspian		Wax Bodega	
October 16	Devin Townsend	Harmonic Dharma			
October 16	Dummy	Do You Love the Color of the Sky?		Polyvinyl	
October 16	Eels	Cookie Happened		E Works, PIAS	
October 16	Eivør	Tungl		Nuclear Blast	
October 16	Fish Narc	Uncle		K	
October 16	Florrie	Magic for a While		BMG, Xenomania UK	
October 16	Fontaines D.C.	Dopamine Chamber		XL	
October 16	Geologist	The Sirens		Outside Time	
October 16	Gothminister	We Are All Demons	Gothic metal, industrial metal	Elevator Records	
October 16	Grace Carter	When Saturn Returns			
October 16	Gucci Mane	Against All Odds			
October 16	Insomnium	Netherworlds		Century Media	
October 16	Jacques Greene	JG		LuckyMe	
October 16	Kid Bookie	Cheaper Than Therapy II		FLG	
October 16	K. Michelle	Jesus & Whiskey		Real Outlawz Records	
October 16	Lucky Daye	Aloud!		Warner	
October 16	Matt Carmichael	Held in the Dark		Porthole Music	
October 16	Max Richter	While the Flood Rages			
October 16	Nao	Autumn		Little Tokyo Records	
October 16	Nero's Day at Disneyland	Grand Reopening		Deathbomb Arc	
October 16	Nieve Ella	How Long Will It Take?	Alternative pop	Artist Theory	
October 16	#1 Dads	Every Little Fire		Pieater	
October 16	The Number Twelve Looks Like You	Howls from the Holographic Heart		Equal Vision	
October 16	Paerish	Rita		SideOneDummy	
October 16	Rachel Chinouriri	I Think I Spoke Too Soon	Synth-pop, pop rock, dance-pop	Parlophone	
October 16	Richard Thompson	Hippies, Thugs and Heroes		New West	
October 16	Rick Wakeman	Return to the Red Planet		Madfish Records	
October 16	The Rubens	Group Therapy			
October 16	Sadurn	The Underworld		Run for Cover	
October 16	Sophia Stel	The Greatest Album of All Time		A24 Music	
October 16	Temperance	Arcani	Symphonic metal, power metal	Napalm	
October 16	They Are Gutting a Body of Water	Kool Faith / Loosies II		ATO, Julia's War	
October 16	Tina Arena	Way of the World		Positive Dream	
October 16	Tinie Tempah	The Night's Not Dead		Imhotep Records	
October 16	Tokio Hotel	Encore	Pop rock	SPV	
October 16	World News	In Purgatory			
October 16	XO	Need to Know		Polydor	
October 16	Ziggy Alberts	Twin Flames			
October 17	Kid Rock	Halfway 2 Jesus	Christian rock	Top Dog Records	
October 21	Ryan Hemsworth	Numbskull		Topshelf	
October 23	Anderson .Paak and Cordae	Heavy Is the Crown		Apeshit, Mass Appeal, Empire	
October 23	Art d'Ecco	Scheele's Green		Paper Bag	
October 23	Baby Lasagna	End the Party			
October 23	Bernie Taupin	The Sea Has No Mercy	Folk	Vertigo, MCA Nashville	
October 23	Brakence	Marrow		Columbia	
October 23	Brothers Osborne	Watertown		MCA	
October 23	The Buoys	Concrete Cowboy		Sony Music Australia, Music for Nations	
October 23	Caroline Rose	Gentling the Horse at the Walt Whitman Mall		Suck Records	
October 23	Clara Mann	Wishbone		State51	
October 23	Claud	Me and the Music		Dead Oceans	
October 23	Dan Sultan	Little Miracles		Mushroom Music	
October 23	Dragonland	Prophecies		Scarlet	
October 23	Dustin Kensrue	That Spirit of Christmas		BMG	
October 23	Entheos	Empty on the Inside		Metal Blade	
October 23	Fenne Lily	Win Win		Nettwerk	
October 23	Fine	Jazz Dreams	Jangle pop, jazz	Escho	
October 23	The Flower Kings	Hope		InsideOut	
October 23	Forbidden	Forbidden		BlkIIBlk	
October 23	GDP	Cross Off Matthew		Run for Cover	
October 23	Get the Shot	Crucifixion Depiction			
October 23	Ghostemane	AM:FM		Blackmage	
October 23	Grey DeLisle	Don't Turn Around		Hummin'bird Records	
October 23	Gus Dapperton	4 Dear Life		Alter Music	
October 23	Hilary Duff	Holiday Things			
October 23	HMLTD	Fangs		Lucky Number Records	
October 23	James Brandon Lewis	Calling Antonín		TAO Forms	
October 23	Jazzy	Peace & Patience		UMG	
October 23	John Legend	Muse		Republic	
October 23	Kendall Street Company	Yodeling Astroman		Gitcha Records	
October 23	Lisa	Press Play		Lloud, RCA	
October 23	LoCash	Chris & Preston		Galaxy Label Group	
October 23	Loidis	From the Toolkit of Lovers	Minimal house	Incienso	
October 23	Manic Street Preachers	The Holy Bible Live		Sony Music	
October 23	Mason Hill	World So Wonderful		7Hz Productions	
October 23	Matt Lang	Ain't That Bad			
October 23	Mental Cruelty	Echoes of a Forlorn Land	Deathcore, melodic death metal, symphonic black metal	Century Media	
October 23	Michael Kiwanuka	Fudge	Psychedelic soul	Polydor	
October 23	Muireann Bradley	Blackwood Pew			
October 23	Nasty	Trauma		Triple B Records	
October 23	Nathan Fake	Caldera		InFiné	
October 23	The Olivia Tremor Control	The Same Place		Elephant 6	
October 23	Orchestra Baobab	Made in Senegal		Strut	
October 23	Polyphia	Be Not Afraid		Rise	
October 23	Sasha Alex Sloan	And the Crowd Goes Mild			
October 23	Sen Morimoto	Time Is on Your Side		Sooper	
October 23	Shabazz Palaces	It's a Style Sport		Sub Pop	
October 23	Shit and Shine	0 aa Riot		Riot Season	
October 23	The Snuts	Joy in Short Moments		Happy Artist Records, VMG	
October 23	Sour Widows	Sigil		Julia's War	
October 23	Stand Atlantic	Godbreath		Virgin Music	
October 23	Strawberry Guy	Give Me a Dream		AWAL	
October 23	Timmy Trumpet	Revelations			
October 23	Tommy Lefroy	The Precariat		Thirty Tigers	
October 23	Tony Iommi	From the Dark		BMG	
October 23	William Basinski	Passing the Cup of Sorrows		Temporary Residence	
October 23	Windwaker	Smile, You're on Camera		Fearless	
October 23	Winona Oak	Bloom		Nettwerk	
October 23	Wolves in the Throne Room	Estuary		Relapse	
October 23	Yung Miami	Watch Dis!	Hip-hop	Uptown	
October 26	Jeshi	Headrush		Select Discs, Partisan	
October 26	Xiaojun	Hey, Somebody		SM	
October 30	2nd Grade	Girls and Boys		Lame-O	
October 30	Against the Current	Till Death & Back			
October 30	Andy Stott	Late Loop		Modern Love	
October 30	Bad Waitress	In the Hollow		Stomp	
October 30	Ben Vaughn and Deer Tick	Magnetic East: The Deer Tick Sessions		Yep Roc	
October 30	The Big Moon	Forever			
October 30	Blind Channel	Painstream		Century Media	
October 30	Chloe Qisha	Fantasize			
October 30	Clinic	Wild in the Streets		Domino	
October 30	Daddy Yankee	La Postal		DY Music	
October 30	Darkest Hour	Suffer Divine		MNRK Heavy	
October 30	David Archuleta	Warm Me Up			
October 30	Dave Hill	Dirty Foot Lane		Jerkin Crocus Promotions	
October 30	DIIV	Zirp!		Fantasy	
October 30	Dominic Fike	How to Quit Smoking		Columbia	
October 30	Dustin Lynch	Clean Slate		BBR, BMG Nashville	
October 30	Editors	Surface, Echo & Sound		PIAS	
October 30	Enslaved	Mið	Black metal, progressive metal	Nuclear Blast	
October 30	Ex:Re	Save As		4AD	
October 30	Fuel	Pendulum			
October 30	Fujiya & Miyagi	New Shiny Object		Impossible Objects of Desire	
October 30	Gretta Ray	Heartsong		EMI Music Australia	
October 30	Haiden Henderson	Bleach		Lava, Republic	
October 30	HorsegiirL	Hardcore Healing		HorsegiirL, RCA	
October 30	Jonah Kagen	Eternity of Anything		Arista	
October 30	Jordan Rakei	A Safe Place to Be Wild		Fontana	
October 30	Kaitlin Butts	Hello, Honky Tonk		Republic	
October 30	Kali Malone	Burning Song		Ideologic Organ	
October 30	Lydia Loveless	Accolades		Bloodshot	
October 30	Ministry	Hate to Go – Take Out or Delivery		Cleopatra	
October 30	Mollie Elizabeth	People Pleaser		Capitol	
October 30	Moses Boyd	Songs for Sinners		Exodus	
October 30	Mylène Farmer	Égrégore		Stuffed Monkey	
October 30	Nettspend	Virginia Creeper	Rage, trap	Grade A, Interscope	
October 30	Nickelback	Everything Under the Sun		VMG	
October 30	OR	Music for Empty Stadiums		AD 93	
October 30	Queens of the Stone Age	Perfecth		Matador	
October 30	RIP Magic	1,2,3		Section1	
October 30	Rocketship	Hurt Feelings		Darla	
October 30	Sampa the Great	Nu Zamrock			
October 30	Sennen	New Quiet		Sonic Cathedral	
October 30	Thao	Show Me		Kill Rock Stars	
October 30	Why?	Oh Golly / Yes Lord		Waterlines Records	
October 30	Yello	Time Lab		Universal	

=== November ===
List of albums to be released in November 2026
Go to: July | August | September | October | December | Unscheduled and TBA | Back to top
Release date	Artist	Album	Genre	Label	Ref.
November 1	Liffey Light Orchestra	Ana Livia		Legal Records	
November 3	BOM (Miranda! and Lali)	Bailar o Morir	Italo disco, dance-pop, house	Sony Argentina	
November 4	Yoasobi	Yoasobi 5th Anniversary Dome Live 2024 "Chō-genjitsu" at Tokyo Dome		Echoes, Sony Japan	
November 6	Alanis Morissette	Good Weather for Immaculate Conception		Epiphany Records, VMG	
November 6	Asia	Indigo	Progressive rock	Frontiers	
November 6	Bad Brains	Are You Ready: The First Studio Recording (Inner Ear – March 1979)		Trust Records	
November 6	Bassvictim	Peace + War		VOTB, Warner	
November 6	Best Ex	Good Girl		Iodine	
November 6	Blu DeTiger	N.Y. Baby			
November 6	Bob Dylan	The Rolling Thunder Revue: The 1976 Live Recordings		Columbia, Legacy	
November 6	Boys Noize	7llvsion	Electronic	Ones and Zeros	
November 6	Bryan Adams	How's It Goin		Bad Records	
November 6	Carnifex	More Than Misery		Sumerian	
November 6	Chastity Belt	All My Friends		Suicide Squeeze	
November 6	The Church	Lacuna		Cooking Vinyl	
November 6	Comeback Kid	Chosen Hell		SharpTone, Dine Alone	
November 6	Computerwife	Born from a Wish		Danger Collective Records	
November 6	Cult of Luna	In the Shadow of Your Shadow		Red Crk Recordings	
November 6	Current Joys	Rosebud		They Are Evil	
November 6	Daine	In Endless Awe & Agony		Pack Records	
November 6	Déyyess	Well I Might Just Die		Boys Boys Boys Records	
November 6	Distant	Into Despair			
November 6	Django Django	Doveland		Clouds Hill	
November 6	Do Nothing	Friend World			
November 6	Dove Cameron	Final Girl		Columbia, Disruptor	
November 6	Extol	Aura of Decay		Solid State	
November 6	Florence and the Machine	Everybody Scream Tour Live			
November 6	Gilbert O'Sullivan	On the Record		BMG	
November 6	Hatebreed	Fatal Paradox	Metalcore, hardcore punk	BlkIIBlk	
November 6	Hypno5e	Trame Noire		Pelagic Records	
November 6	Jack Harlow	Sweet Action II			
November 6	James Blunt	Airplane Mode		Atlantic	
November 6	Jesse Jo Stark	Muse		Deadly Doll	
November 6	Jim Jarmusch and Jozef van Wissem	Bocca di Lupo		Sacred Bones	
November 6	Jim Jarmusch and Jozef van Wissem	Mouth of the Wolf		Sacred Bones	
November 6	Katie Gregson-MacLeod	Albatross		Last Recordings On Earth	
November 6	Kings of Leon	O My Beloved	Southern rock, Americana, country rock	LoveTap Records	
November 6	Lil Baby	Fresh			
November 6	Little Angels	Big Bad & Back EP			
November 6	Midnight	Satanic Attack Live!		Metal Blade	
November 6	Naked Raygun	Live at Riot Fest		Loud Pizza Records	
November 6	Natalie Bergman	I Killed a North American Songbird		Third Man	
November 6	Odette	Blink		Beloved Records	
November 6	Oso Oso	An Exchange of Information		Feral Twin Records	
November 6	Prong	Prong		Napalm	
November 6	Party Dozen	21 Bum Salute		City Slang	
November 6	Passenger	Wild Love			
November 6	Resa Saffa Park	Kendra		Ja. Group	
November 6	Rex Orange County	Dream Fatigue			
November 6	Robert Grace	My Fathers Son			
November 6	La Roux	Old Flames		Vertigo	
November 6	Sam Barber	The Outlier		Atlantic Outpost	
November 6	SATCHVAI Band	The Sea of Emotion		earMUSIC	
November 6	Shygirl	Swallow!	Experimental pop	Because	
November 6	Skepta	The Fork and Knife			
November 6	Spanish Love Songs	Future Nausea		Pure Noise	
November 6	Steven Wilson	Requiem for a Village	Progressive rock	Fiction	
November 6	Straw Man Army	True North		La Vida Es Un Mus Discos	
November 6	Sufjan Stevens	Worst Christmas Ever!		Asthmatic Kitty	
November 6	Thrown	Unwanted		Arising Empire	
November 6	Tove Styrke	I Thought This Story Wasn't About Me		Sony Music Sweden	
November 6	Trollfest	Trollywood		Reaper Entertainment	
November 6	TV Priest	Cartoons			
November 6	Twisted Teens	The Holy Cross Tigers		Sub Pop	
November 6	Willi Carlisle	The Universal Bubba			
November 6	Yoo Doo Right	Build and Rest by the Shepherd's Light		Mothland	
November 9	Ice Nine Kills	A Very Vicious Christmas			
November 11	2hollis	Pirouette	EDM, electropop, rage	Interscope	
November 11	Anberlin	Currency		Equal Vision	
November 11	Bruiser Wolf and Conductor Williams	The Dealer Wins			
November 11	Chanmina	Legend		No Label	
November 11	Eliza Rose	Arcadia: Pleasuredome			
November 12	Ecco2k	Echo		9th	
November 13	Aesop Rock and Blockhead	Trouble Mountain		Rhymesayers	
November 13	Alana Henderson	Fine			
November 13	Amira Elfeky	It Was Only a Dream		Atlantic	
November 13	Ateez	Golden Hour: Part.6		Sony Music Korea, RCA	
November 13	Blackhaine	Saints in the Wethouse		XL	
November 13	Becky Hill	Rebecca		Polydor, Astralwerks	
November 13	Bell X1	Good Bones			
November 13	Belly Gang Kushington	Good Dope Sell Itself		LVRN	
November 13	Breakkaway	It All Feels the Same from Afar		Epitaph	
November 13	Los Bitchos	Los Bitchos & Friends Vol. 1		GREAT! Records, !K7	
November 13	The Body and Cel Genesis	Whole Wide World		Thrill Jockey	
November 13	Cherry Bomb	The Pursuit of Pleasure			
November 13	The Datsuns	Moonstruck Man		Hellsquad Records	
November 13	David Kushner	Devotion			
November 13	Diamond Rio	America Works		Rio Records 2.0, One Riot Records	
November 13	DJ Heartstring	Sentimental Ultra		Steel City Dance Discs	
November 13	Dropkick Murphys	20th Century Paddy – The Songs of Shane MacGowan			
November 13	Ed Palermo Big Band	It's an Ed Palermo Christmas! God Bless Us, Everyone!		Sky Cat Records	
November 13	Esme Emerson	It's All Just Noise		Communion	
November 13	Font	American Bully XL		Acrophase	
November 13	Fucked Up	Year of the Rooster		Tankcrimes	
November 13	Heaven in Her Arms	The End of Purification		Banshies	
November 13	Gwar and John Brennan and the Bigfeet	Gwar and the Last Drive-In-Stein			
November 13	Heavens Edge	Philadelphia		Frontiers	
November 13	Iron Savior	Deathbringer		Frontiers	
November 13	Jake Bugg	Alamo		Thirty Tigers	
November 13	Kalia Vandever and Dave Harrington	Evergreen		Sudden Quarterly	
November 13	Kim Deal	Live at the Barbican		4AD	
November 13	Kittie	Oracle XXV			
November 13	Krill	Secret Language		Exploding in Sound	
November 13	Land of Talk	Lasts		Saddle Creek	
November 13	Live Skull	What Could Go Wrong?		Bronson Recordings	
November 13	Offset	GMFU			
November 13	Randy Travis	Same Old Way		Warner Records Nashville	
November 13	Royal Blood	Dead Company		Warner	
November 13	Rwake	Built from Stardust - 'The Return of Magik' Live in Little Rock, AR		Relapse	
November 13	Say Now	Say What You See	Electropop	Atlantic	
November 13	Sharon Shannon	Home			
November 13	Silvertomb	The Interpretation of Nightmares		Steamhammer/SPV	
November 13	Snoh Aalegra	Legendary Love		Stem	
November 13	Swansea Sound	Pre-Post-Truth			
November 13	Trentemøller	Trentemøller		In My Room	
November 13	U2	Carnaval de Luz		Island	
November 13	Walls of Jericho	System Error: Humanity		Napalm	
November 13	Wavves	Cherry Soda		I Surrender Records, Bose Records	
November 13	Waylon Jennings	Diamonds		Son of Jessi, Thirty Tigers	
November 13	Westside Gunn	Heelmatic		Griselda, Mass Appeal	
November 13	Yngwie Malmsteen	Hell or High Water		Music Theories Recordings, Artone Label Group	
November 13	Zebra	Zebra V			
November 16	Tomorrow X Together	Perfect Storm	Avant-pop	Big Hit Music	
November 19	Angelus Apatrida	The Reckoning		Napalm	
November 20	Alan Vega	Live at Max's Kansas City		Sacred Bones	
November 20	Any Given Sin	Until We Disappear			
November 20	Atlas Sound	Thanatos		4AD	
November 20	Desperate Journalist	Gilding the Lily		Fierce Panda	
November 20	Disfear	The Last Nail		Relapse	
November 20	Down	Volume V		Nuclear Blast	
November 20	Eidola	The Will to Power		3DOT Recordings	
November 20	Girish and the Chronicles	Disintegrate			
November 20	Joshua Redman	If Ever You Would Leave Us (We Play for Rollins)		Blue Note	
November 20	Julianna Barwick and Mary Lattimore	Threshold (Original Motion Picture Score)		Florid Recordings, Blue Pool Recordings	
November 20	Lael Neale	As Killers Do		Consensual Sound	
November 20	Lambchop	Demoed			
November 20	Ledbyher	Midwinter		Island	
November 20	Lorenzo Senni	All Ages		Warp	
November 20	Marvin Sapp	Restoration	Gospel	Roc Nation	
November 20	Mez	Electric Future Gangster		Mass Appeal	
November 20	Rammstein	Live in Mexico City			
November 20	R.E.M.	The Black Sessions Revealed		Craft	
November 20	Richard Skelton and Lawrence English	Noon		Phantom Limb	
November 20	Suicide Silence	Graceless			
November 20	Take That	Dreamers	Pop	EMI	
November 20	Then Comes Silence	Requiem Ballroom			
November 20	Thy Catafalque	XIII: Sárga Erdő		Season of Mist	
November 20	Toro y Moi	Unusua			
November 20	Trivium	Crown in the Grave	Metalcore, thrash metal, heavy metal	Roadrunner	
November 20	Wolf	Hour of the Wolf		Fireflash Records	
November 25	Pretty Lights	A Trip Thru Time Fantastic			
November 26	Priya Ragu	Madras			
November 27	Björk	Björk Orkestral with the Hamrahlíð Choir		One Little Independent	
November 27	The Blue Aeroplanes	Tales from the Silver Lounge		Artstar Records	
November 27	Cliff Richard	Only Number Ones			
November 27	Contrarian	Escaping Depravity		Willowtip Records	
November 27	Factory Floor	One Trip		Phantasy Sound	
November 27	Jon Bryant	Harbour		Nettwerk Music Group	
November 27	King 810	La Grande Mort or Silence of God			
November 27	Leviathan	Die to This		Profound Lore	
November 27	Molly Hatchet	Lost Horizon		Steamhammer/SPV	
November 27	Morten Harket	Human Grace			
November 27	Mya Mehmi	M1		Dialled In Records	
November 27	Mystic Prophecy	In Metal		Perception Records, Reigning Phoenix	
November 27	Neal Morse and The Resonance	River of Light			
November 27	Northlane	Anemoia		Immortal, Believe	
November 27	PeelingFlesh	PeelingFlesh		Unique Leader	
November 27	Peter Gabriel	O\I		Real World	
November 27	Purple Pilgrims	Given to the Night		AD 93	
November 27	Whiplash	Roar		Time To Kill Records	
November 30	Taeyeon	Unspecial		SM	

=== December ===
List of albums to be released in December 2026
Go to: July | August | September | October | November | Unscheduled and TBA | Back to top
Release date	Artist	Album	Genre	Label	Ref.
December 1	Beans On Toast	The Great Unravelling			
December 1	Infant Annihilator	The Somnial Plunge into Cyclic Ebullition			
December 2	Hanabie.	Umami		Epic Japan	
December 4	2 Chainz and Statik Selektah	Playaz Only Live Once			
December 4	Don Toliver	Nitrous		Cactus Jack, Donnway & Co Records, Atlantic	
December 4	Eleine	The Water Taste of Blood		Algoth Records	
December 4	End of Green	Ashes & Gold			
December 4	Forrest Frank	The Jesus Generation		River House Records	
December 4	Harakiri for the Sky	Reliving the Trauma – Live at Theater Akzent		AOP Records	
December 4	Jonny Greenwood and Dudu Tassa	Jalsa			
December 4	King Gizzard & the Lizard Wizard	Entropy		(p)doom Records	
December 4	Kristin Hersh	Downers on Blackstone			
December 4	Morphine	Cocoon		Partisan	
December 4	Parkway Drive	Home – Live at the Sydney Opera House		Parkway Records, Civilians	
December 4	Self Esteem	A Complicated Woman - Live from Brixton Academy		Polydor	
December 4	Slayyyter	Worst Man in America		Records, Columbia	
December 4	Soak	Decembers			
December 11	Æther Realm	Season of Bloodshed		Napalm	
December 11	Archon Angel	Beyond the Grave		Frontiers	
December 11	Doro	Wild at Heart			
December 11	Keaton Henson	Versions		PIAS	
December 11	Nightwish	The Greatest 30 Years on Earth		Nuclear Blast	
December 11	Oklou and Rob	In Waves		Because Music	
December 11	Panda Bear	PB Band Live 25 at Power Station		Domino Documents	
December 11	Warpaint	Artifact		Rough Trade	
December 11	Whitmer Thomas	Green Room Blues		Fire Talk Records	
December 18	Robin Carolan	Werwulf		Back Lot Music, Sacred Bones	
December 18	Vybz Kartel	The Sun			
December 23	Man with a Mission	The Circus		Sony Music, Century Media	

== Unscheduled and TBA ==
List of albums to be released sometime in 2026
Go to: July | August | September | October | November | December | Back to top
Artist	Album	Genre	Label	Ref.
Bruce Springsteen	TBA			
Candlebox	TBA			
Cardi B	TBA		Atlantic	
Courtney Love	TBA			
Doechii	TBA		Top Dawg, Capitol	
Everclear	TBA			
Foals	TBA			
Gojira	TBA			
Gorguts	TBA			
Labi Siffre	Unfinished Business		Demon	
Lita Ford	TBA			
Megan Thee Stallion	Megan: Act III		Hot Girl, Warner	
Michael Stipe	TBA			
Overkill	TBA			
Papa Roach	TBA		New Noize Records, ADA	
Symphony X	TBA			
