= We Will Rise =

Studio album by Tungsten
- Released: 20 September 2019
- Recorded: 2018–2019
- Genres: Heavy metal, power metal
- Length: 43:56
- Label: Arising Empire
- Producer: Nick Johansson

Tungsten chronology
| We Will Rise (2019) | Tundra (2020) |

Singles from We Will Rise
- 1. "We Will Rise" Released: 1 July 2019; 2. "The Fairies Dance" Released: 16 August 2019; 3. "Misled" Released: 20 September 2019

Professional ratings
Review scores
| Source | Rating |
|---|---|
| Distorted Sound | 7/10 |
| GBHBL | 8/10 |
| Metal Temple | 9/10 |
| Rock Hard | 7.5/10 |

We Will Rise is the debut studio album by Swedish power metal band Tungsten, released on 20 September 2019. The album contains songs titled "We Will Rise" and "The Fairies Dance", which were both published as singles before the album's release.

== Track listing ==
| No. | Title | Length |
|---|---|---|
| 1. | "We Will Rise" | 3:24 |
| 2. | "Misled" | 3:44 |
| 3. | "The Fairies Dance" | 3:57 |
| 4. | "Coming Home" | 3:06 |
| 5. | "It Ain't Over" | 4:01 |
| 6. | "As I'm Falling" | 3:44 |
| 7. | "Sweet Vendetta" | 3:31 |
| 8. | "Animals" | 3:43 |
| 9. | "Remember" | 3:39 |
| 10. | "To the Bottom (Fading Away)" | 4:03 |
| 11. | "Impolite" | 3:21 |
| 12. | "Wish upon a Star" | 3:43 |

== Personnel ==
- Mike Andersson – clean vocals
- Federico Mondelli – guitars
- Karl Johansson – bass, keyboards, harsh vocals
- Anders Johansson – drums
