= Hunger for a Way Out =

Studio album by Sweeping Promises
- Released: August 14, 2020
- Recorded: Late 2019 to early 2020
- Studio: Brooklyn, New York City, New York, United States
- Genre: Indie rock; lo-fi; post-punk
- Length: 27:44
- Language: English
- Label: Feel It

Sweeping Promises chronology
Hunger for a Way Out (2020)	Good Living Is Coming for You (2023)

Hunger for a Way Out is the first full-length album by American indie rock band Sweeping Promises, release by Feel It Records on August 14, 2020.

== Reception ==
Bill Pearis of BrooklynVegan named this the indie album of the week for having "ultra-catchy, danceable songs" and speculating that it would be a top 10 personal favorite for the year. In NME, Tristan Gatward gave this album 4 out of 5 stars, calling it "a titanic debut album serving up basement grooves and raw post-punk spirit" with music that "is raw, urgent basement music, hurtling through as many gems as possible before the lights come up".

== Track listing ==
All songs written by Lira Mondal and Caufield Schnug

1. "Hunger for a Way Out" – 2:21
2. "Cross Me Out" – 3:09
3. "Blue" – 3:00
4. "Out Again" – 2:30
5. "Safe Now" – 3:37
6. "Falling Forward" – 2:28
7. "Upright" – 2:32
8. "Atelier" – 2:52
9. "An Appetite" – 2:28
10. "Trust" – 2:47

== Personnel ==
Sweeping Promises

- Lira Mondal – instrumentation, vocals, recording, mastering
- Caufield Schnug – instrumentation, recording, mastering

Additional personnel

- Spenser Gralla – drums on "Falling Forward"
- D. H. Strother – artwork

== See also ==
- List of 2020 albums
