= Hot Wet Delirious =

2026 single by Rebecca Black

Single by Rebecca Black

from the album Age of the Exhibitionist
- Released: July 10, 2026
- Length: 3:08
- Label: Self-released
- Songwriters: Rebecca Black; Jesse Saint John; Oscar Scheller
- Producers: Oscar Scheller; Nightfeelings

Rebecca Black singles chronology
"Speakerphone" (2026)	"Hot Wet Delirious" (2026)	"Michael." (2026)

Music video
- "Hot Wet Delirious" on YouTube

"Hot Wet Delirious" is a song by American singer Rebecca Black, self-released on July 10, 2026. The song was released alongside the announcement of her second studio album, Age of the Exhibitionist (2026).

== Background ==
The lyrics of the track are about a forbidden relationship.

== Reception ==
The Music Universe called the track "electrifying". De Volkskrant said "Rebecca Black is getting better and more ambitious with every step, as the amazing production on this new single shows".

== Music video ==
A music video was released for the song, directed by Hannah De Vries and Black herself.

== Live performance ==
Black played the song live for the first time on July 16, 2026 during her guest appearance on Canada's Drag Race All Stars.
