= Good Living Is Coming for You =

Studio album by Sweeping Promises
- Released: June 30, 2023
- Genres: Indie rock; lo-fi; post-punk
- Length: 30:19
- Language: English
- Labels: Feel It, Sub Pop

Sweeping Promises chronology
Hunger for a Way Out (2020)	Good Living Is Coming for You (2023)	You Say I Romanticize (2026)

It's a slightly more complexified recording, but we still want to be cave people. We're talking a very minimal monophonic sort of setup. We still try to move as fast as sin.

— Caufield Schnug on recording Good Living Is Coming for You

Good Living Is Coming for You is the second full-length album by American indie rock band Sweeping Promises, release by Feel It Records and Sub Pop on June 30, 2023. The album was supported by a world tour.

== Reception ==
Professional ratings
Review scores
Source	Rating
AllMusic	4/5 stars
Exclaim!	7/10
Loud and Quiet	7/10
Paste	8.2/10
Pitchfork	7.8/10

Editors at AllMusic rated this album 4 out of 5 stars, with critic Heather Phares writing that compared to their debut album, "Hunger for a Way Out was such a strikingly rough diamond that Good Living Is Coming for You couldn't have the same element of surprise, but the refinements Sweeping Promises have made only reinforce how consistent and distinctive their music is—and how much more it has to offer". Editors at Bandcamp shortlisted this album as some of the best punk music of July 2023, calling it a "modern classic" for "their lo-fi, gritty production and their ability to use minimal instrumentation to create full-bodied, melodic songs" and vocalist "Lira Mondal using her voice as a versatile instrument". Bill Pearis of BrooklynVegan named this the indie album of the week for "compressing decades of post-punk, punk, riot girl, alt-rock, etc into punchy pop diamonds". In Exclaim!, Kate Shepherd rated this album a 7 out of 10, calling this release "no less dynamic than its predecessor" and summing up that this "is a vibrant, captivating record that feels like both a wake-up call and a persuasive invitation to resist a culture of consumption and commodification—of space, time, and even ourselves". Theo Gorst of Loud and Quiet also scored this release a 7 out of 10, calling the music fun and comparing it favorably to post-punk revival acts; a feature by Nadia Younes for the site also referred to it as the "best DIY punk you'll hear this year". Editors at Paste declared this Album of the Week and reviewer Taylor Ruckle gave it an 8.2 out of 10, writing that the band's social commentary has improved and calls the album "clever and absurd". Writing for Pitchfork, Phillipe Roberts gave this album a 7.8 out of 10, praising the lyrics by Lira Mondal and continuing, "Matching this glorious lack of subtlety blow for blow, the mangled, lo-fi instrumentation prizes melody over texture, piling hooks on top of hooks". The site also ran a feature on the band shortly after this album's release, with Grant Sharples calling it "exhilarating".

Good Living Is Coming for You in best-of lists
Outlet	Listing	Rank
AllMusic	Favorite Alternative & Indie Albums	—N/a
BBC Radio 6 Music	Albums of the Year	—N/a
BrooklynVegan	BrooklynVegan's Top 55 Albums of 2023	—N/a
BrooklynVegan	Indie Basement: Top 40 Albums of 2023	—N/a
Exclaim!	Exclaim!'s 50 Best Albums of 2023	49
NPR Music	The 50 Best Albums of 2023	—N/a
Paste	The 50 Best Albums of 2023	34
Pitchfork	The 50 Best Albums of 2023	49
Pitchfork	The 37 Best Rock Albums of 2023	—N/a
Rolling Stone	The 40 Best Indie-Rock Albums of 2023	—N/a

== Track listing ==
All songs written by Lira Mondal and Caufield Schnug

1. "Eraser" – 2:44
2. "Shadow Me" – 2:29
3. "Good Living Is Coming for You" – 3:37
4. "Connoisseur of Salt" – 3:46
5. "Walk in Place" – 2:37
6. "You Shatter" – 3:16
7. "Petit Four" – 3:05
8. "Can't Hide It" – 3:15
9. "Throw of the Dice" – 3:01
10. "Ideal No" – 2:28

== Personnel ==
Sweeping Promises

- Lira Mondal – instrumentation, vocals, recording, mastering
- Caufield Schnug – instrumentation, recording, mastering

Additional personnel

- Will Henriksen – violin on "Connoisseur of Salt"
- D. H. Strother – artwork

== See also ==
- 2023 in American music
- List of 2023 albums
