= The Grand Inferno =

Studio album by Tungsten
- Released: 8 November 2024
- Recorded: 2023–2024
- Genres: Symphonic metal, power metal
- Length: 42:33
- Label: Reigning Phoenix
- Producer: Nick Johansson

Tungsten chronology
| Bliss (2022) | The Grand Inferno (2024) | Ashes (2026) |

Singles from The Grand Inferno
- 1. "Blood of the Kings" Released: 4 June 2024; 2. "Vantablack" Released: 21 July 2024; 3. "Lullaby" Released: 24 August 2024; 4. "The Grand Inferno" Released: 29 September 2024

Professional ratings
Review scores
| Source | Rating |
|---|---|
| Metal Temple | 8/10 |
| Metal-Roos | 5/5 |
| Powermetal.de | 9.5/10 |

The Grand Inferno is the fourth studio album by Swedish power metal band Tungsten, released on 8 November 2024. "Vantablack" is a re-recording of the title track from the band's 2017 demo album that was recorded under the band name Strokkur.

== Track listing ==
| No. | Title | Length |
|---|---|---|
| 1. | "Anger" | 4:22 |
| 2. | "Blood of the Kings" | 4:00 |
| 3. | "Lullaby" (featuring Amanda Johansson and Isabelle Hedlund) | 4:03 |
| 4. | "The Grand Inferno" | 4:42 |
| 5. | "Falling Apart" | 3:51 |
| 6. | "Walborg" | 2:53 |
| 7. | "Vantablack" | 3:28 |
| 8. | "Me, Myself, My Enemy" | 3:55 |
| 9. | "Chaos" | 3:57 |
| 10. | "Sound of a Violin" | 3:35 |
| 11. | "Angel Eyes" | 3:47 |

== Personnel ==
- Mike Andersson – clean vocals
- Nick Johansson – guitars
- Karl Johansson – bass, keyboards, harsh vocals
- Anders Johansson – drums
