= Tundra (Tungsten album) =

Studio album by Tungsten
- Released: 20 November 2020
- Recorded: December 2019 – February 2020
- Genres: Power metal, folk metal
- Length: 46:22
- Label: Arising Empire
- Producer: Nick Johansson

Tungsten chronology
We Will Rise (2019)	Tundra (2020)	Bliss (2022)

Singles from Tundra
- 1. "King of Shadows" Released: 11 September 2020; 2. "Life and the Ocean" Released: 16 October 2020

Professional ratings
Review scores
Source	Rating
Metal Hammer	4/7
Powermetal.de	9/10
Rock Hard	6/10

Tundra is the second studio album by Swedish power metal band Tungsten, released on 20 November 2020. The album contains songs such as "Life of the Ocean" and "Tundra", which were both published as singles before the album's release. The lyrics of the album tell the story of Volfram, the Guardian of Time, and his adventure through an icy tundra. A guest appearance was made by Jens Johansson, Anders' brother, who is known as the keyboardist of bands such as Rainbow and Stratovarius, performing a keyboard solo on the album's closing track, "Here Comes the Fall".

== Track listing ==
No.	Title	Length
1.	"Lock and Load"	3:44
2.	"Volfram’s Song"	3:36
3.	"Time"	3:31
4.	"Divided Generations"	4:01
5.	"King of Shadows"	3:52
6.	"Tundra"	4:14
7.	"Paranormal"	4:20
8.	"Life and the Ocean"	4:19
9.	"I See Fury"	4:18
10.	"This Is War"	3:13
11.	"Here Comes the Fall" (featuring Jens Johansson)	7:14

== Personnel ==
- Mike Andersson – clean vocals
- Federico Mondelli – guitars
- Karl Johansson – bass, keyboards, harsh vocals
- Anders Johansson – drums
