= Bliss (Tungsten album) =

Studio album by Tungsten
- Released: 17 June 2022
- Recorded: 2021–2022
- Genres: Industrial metal, power metal, symphonic metal
- Length: 45:30
- Label: Arising Empire
- Producer: Nick Johansson

Tungsten chronology
Tundra (2020)	Bliss (2022)	The Grand Inferno (2024)

Singles from Bliss
- 1. "March Along" Released: 4 March 2022; 2. "Bliss" Released: 8 April 2022; 3. "On the Sea" Released: 13 May 2022

Professional ratings
Review scores
Source	Rating
Distorted Sound	8/10
GBHBL	8/10
Kerrang!	3/5
Powermetal.de	9/10

Bliss is the third studio album by Swedish power metal band Tungsten, released on 17 June 2022.

== Track listing ==
No.	Title	Length
1.	"In the Center"	4:36
2.	"Dreamers"	3:13
3.	"March Along" (featuring Amanda Johansson)	3:53
4.	"Heart of Rust"	4:01
5.	"Come This Way"	3:39
6.	"On the Sea"	3:53
7.	"Bliss"	4:12
8.	"Wonderland"	4:40
9.	"Afraid of Light"	2:57
10.	"Eye of the Storm"	4:00
11.	"Northern Lights"	6:26

== Personnel ==
- Mike Andersson – clean vocals
- Federico Mondelli – guitars
- Karl Johansson – bass, keyboards, harsh vocals
- Anders Johansson – drums
