= Luh Leakyz Vol. 1 =

Mixtape by Yeat
- Released: October 23, 2026
- Recorded: 2021–2026
- Genres: Rage; trap
- Length: 40:01
- Labels: Field Trip; Capitol; Yeat
- Producers: 206Derek; 730hahah; Bnyx; Cai Burns; Campthehills; Darkoivx; DKanee; Dream Awake; Fendii; Flansie; Flowrency; Jack Zorana; Kayyo; Lukovic; Matt Spatola; Money Jezu$; Omgzanoza; Perdu; Pooka; Radiate; Rafe; Redda; Sideus; Skimayne; Synthetic; Talk2Primo; Trgc; Venny; Xbrvdy; Yeat

Yeat chronology
Cocoon (2026)	Luh Leakyz Vol. 1 (2026)

Luh Leakyz Vol. 1 is the fifth and debut studio mixtape by American rapper Yeat. It was released through Lyfestyle Corporation, Field Trip Recordings, and Capitol Records on October 23, 2026. Luh Leakyz Vol.1 is a compilation album that contains 14 tracks that all leaked from 2021 to early 2026. Upon release, the mixtape earned 17,000 album equivalent units and debuted at number 39 on the Billboard 200, making it Yeat's tenth consecutive project to debut on the chart.

== Background and release ==
The earliest mentions of a "grail tape" emerged in 2024, when Yeat cryptically hinted that they would see an official release soon via his Instagram story. Since then, Yeat has been often quiet-minded about the idea of releasing them anything soon until October 2026, when Yeat was added as a character in the popular battle royale game Fortnite. Following his arrival in the game, fans got the chance to interact with his NPC in game and get the chance to earn hidden Jam Tracks, four of which were added, with those being "HeliMan", "Lil Krazy", "Timë Passed", and "Märching".

A week after his Fortnite debut, Yeat would announce on October 22, 2026, via his Instagram Story that "all eras" of his music will "be in the cup". That same day, he would showcase the mixtape's cover art as well as announce via social media that the mixtape would be released on the night of October 23, 2026. The mixtape would officially release on October 23, 2026, and would have 14 tracks, with a guest appearance from rapper Summrs.

== Composition ==
Luh Leakyz Vol. 1 is a 14-track mixtape by Yeat; the mixtape contains one guest appearance from rapper Summrs, who Yeat has frequently collaborated with in the past. The tape is referred to as a "grail tape" of highly anticipated leaks by fans, the mixtape blends "different era" tracks across Yeat's entire career ranging from 2021 to 2026 just before the release of his EP Cocoon. The mixtape utilizes sounds that Yeat is often known for, it features bass-heavy sounds, futuristic trap altered vocals, and frequent repetition of his chorus, which, noted by Quincy Dominic of Rating Games Music, keeps his fans engaged with his works. Lyrically, Yeat raps about his hedonistic lifestyle, which consists of obtaining money, indulging in promiscuous women, and addressing and threatening his opponents in the music scene.

== Commercial performance ==
Luh Leakyz Vol. 1 debuted at number 39 on the Billboard 200, earning 17,000 album equivalent units in its first week, it became Yeat's tenth consecutive Billboard-charting project, following the release of his album ADL, which charted at number 5.

== Track listing ==
Luh Leakyz Vol. 1 track listing
No.	Title	Writer(s)	Producer(s)	Length
1.	"Lil Krazy"	Noah Smith; Jammarius Hill; Jonathan Zvi; Darko Ivančević	Yeat; Trgc; Pooka; Darkoivx	2:45
2.	"Time Passed"	Smith; Ivančević; Javier Mercado; Spencer Mott; Louis Esposito; Joseph Kevin Santino Fenderson	Synthetic; Radiate; Perdu; Fendii; Darkoivx	2:21
3.	"Live Dis Lyfe"	Smith; Bryan Trillos; Leon Hendriks	Redda; Skimayne	2:17
4.	"Real Trendsetter"	Smith; Volodymyr Dorofeiev; Pablo Alberto Sanchez	Dream Awake; DKanee	2:56
5.	"When tha World Ends"	Smith; Dorofeiev; Nicolò Castrichini	Dream Awake; Sideus	3:11
6.	"Marching"	Smith; Nikita Zvorygin; Matvei Shalnev	Bnyx; 206Derek; Money Jezu$; Matt Spatola	3:00
7.	"Sklub"	Smith; Nikita Zvorygin; Matvei Shalnev	Smith; 730hahah; Omgzanoza	2:58
8.	"U Could"	Smith; Mercado; Campbell Lyle Rolston-Clemmer	Synthetic; CampTheHills	2:58
9.	"X with the Boot Up"	Smith; Dorofeiev; Luuk Mari Broersma	Yeat; Dream Awake; Lukovic	2:58
10.	"Disease"	Smith; Mercado; Steven Giron; Primo Pepper; Rafe Nelson; Cai Christian Burns	Synthetic; Venny; Rafe; Talk2Primo; Cai Burns	3:30
11.	"HeliMan"	Smith; Mercado; Brady Tremblay; Jack Pelletier; Artem Zherdev	Synthetic; Jack Zorana; XBrvdy; Flowrency	3:12
12.	"Countup" (featuring Summrs)	Smith; Hill; Deante Adam Johnson; Kiselev Maxim Vitalievich	Trgc; Kayyo	2:34
13.	"Martian"	Smith; Hendriks; Tuheij Maruwanaya	Flansie; Skimayne	2:54
14.	"Last Day"	Smith; Mercado; Fenderson; Giron; Ivančević	Synthetic; Fendii; Venny; Darkoivx	2:32
Total length:				40:01

=== Notes ===
- Tracks six and seven are stylized in all caps
- Tracks eight and nine are stylized in sentence case
- "Heliman" is stylized as "HeliMAn"

== Personnel ==
Credits adapted from Apple Music and Tidal.

- Yeat – songwriting, production (1, 7, 9), recording, mixing, mastering
- Simon Zylstra – artwork

== Charts ==
Chart performance for Luh Leakyz Vol. 1
Chart (2026)	Peak position
Australian Albums (ARIA)	64
Austrian Albums (Ö3 Austria)	70
Canadian Albums (Billboard)	86
Polish Albums (ZPAV)	66
Swiss Albums (Schweizer Hitparade)	25
US Billboard 200	39

== Release history ==
Release dates and formats for Luh Leakyz Vol. 1
Region	Date	Format(s)	Label	Ref.
Various	October 23, 2026	LP; CD; digital download; streaming	Lyfestyle Corporation; Field Trip Recordings; Capitol Records	
