= Font (band) =

American indie rock band

- Genres: Indie rock, post punk
- Years active: 2022-present
- Members: Thom Waddill; Jack Owens; Anthony Lawrence; Roman Parnell; Jacob Silva

Font is an American indie rock band from Austin, Texas.

== History ==
Singer and guitarist Thom Waddill and drummer Jack Owens were roommates in college in North Carolina, playing in dance hall bands together. Wanting to continue music after college, the two settled on Austin, Texas to start a new band. In Austin, the two met drummer Logan Wagner, percussionist Jacob Silvia and bassist Roman Parnell. The band began playing shows with only two songs available on streaming. The band announced their debut full-length album in 2024 titled Strange Burden, alongside the single "Hey Kekulé". The album received positive reviews.

== Discography ==
Studio albums

- Strange Burden (2024, self-released)
