= World News (band) =

British rock band

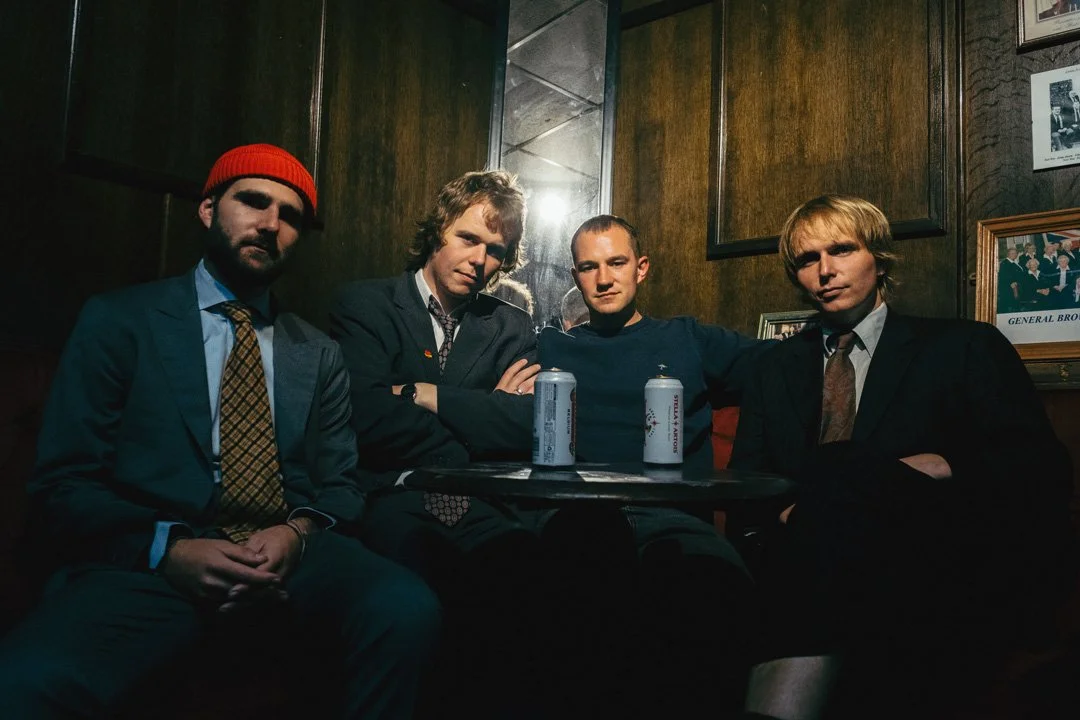

Background information
- Origin: London, England
- Genres: Alternative rock; post-punk; indie rock
- Years active: 2019–present
- Labels: Pie & Mash Records
- Members: Alex Evans; Rory Evans; Malte Henning; Jack Tollman
- Website: worldnews.band

World News are a London-based alternative rock band consisting of Alex Evans (lead vocals, lead guitar), Rory Evans (bass guitar), Malte Henning (drums), and Jack Tollman (rhythm guitar).

== History ==
World News released their debut EP, Job and Money, in 2020. This was followed by Flag With No Pole in 2023 and two EPs in 2024: Escape and Mindsnap. Their first album, In Purgatory, was released on October 16th of 2026.

== Musical style and influences ==
World News' music has been described as blending post-punk and new wave influences with elements of indie rock. Earmilk highlighted their single "Don't Want To Know," noting its "delayed, hook-driven guitar line" and vocals evoking late-1970s and early-1980s post-punk and new wave, comparing their sound to The Smiths and The Clash. The Line of Best Fit noted the band for its "cascading guitar lines." Stereogum described their singles "Back To Hong Kong" and "Red" as evoking the "halcyon days of college rock" and compared their style to Real Estate and Parquet Courts. The Fader described them as making "throwback indie rock of the highest order," comparing them to Talk Talk and The Smiths.

== Critical reception ==
In 2023, The Line of Best Fit praised the single "Wrapped in Gold," describing it as opening with guitar reminiscent of Jimi Hendrix and predicting the band had the potential to be the "best power trio since The Police."

In May 2024, Stereogum featured their Escape EP, calling it "excellently jangly" and recommending the band to fans of Real Estate and Parquet Courts.

In November 2024, Stereogum named World News one of the 40 Best New Artists of 2024, writing that the band's Escape EP contains "echoes of entire generations of alternative music."

In December 2024, KEXP reviewed the Mindsnap EP, describing it as "a strong collection of expansive, moody, jangle rock delights" and noting its fusion of indie rock, post-punk, shoegaze, and Krautrock influences.

In December 2024, The Fader included World News in their "13 Artists We're Excited About in 2025" list, describing them as making "throwback indie rock of the highest order" and comparing them to Talk Talk and The Smiths.

Rolling Stone included World News in a "Ones to Watch" feature, describing their single "Sidestep" as offering a sound with 1980s pop rock and soft indie influences.

In April 2026, Far Out Magazine profiled the band, praising their recent singles as "festival-field-sized and anthemic."

In 2026, Clunk Magazine reviewed "Sidestep," calling World News "London's hottest new band" and describing the single as "a bold statement of intent."

== Discography ==
=== Albums ===
- In Purgatory (2026)

=== EPs ===
- Job and Money (2020)
- Flag With No Pole (2023)
- Escape (2024)
- Mindsnap (2024)

=== Singles ===
- "Wake Up" (2019)
- "Give It Time" (2020)
- "Xmas 101" (2021)
- "I Don't Like Your Perfume" (2022)
- "Wrapped in Gold" (2023)
- "The Tinman" (2023)
- "Back to Hong Kong" (2024)
- "Red" (2024)
- "Mindsnap" (2024)
- "Junkie" (2024)
- "Don't Ever Meet Your Hero" (2024)
- "Smoke an Angel" (2024)
- "Don't Want to Know" (2025)
- "Everything Is Coming Up Roses" (2025)
- "Sidestep" (2026)
- "The Way It Goes" (2026)
- "Vinegar Swimming Pool" (2026)

== Band members ==
- Alex Evans – lead vocals, lead guitar
- Rory Evans – bass guitar
- Malte Henning – drums
- Jack Tollman – rhythm guitar
