= Different When It's Silent =

Studio album by Tricky
- Released: 17 July 2026
- Length: 41:07
- Label: False Idols

Tricky chronology
Fall to Pieces (2020)	Different When It's Silent (2026)

Different When It's Silent is the fifteenth studio album by British musician Tricky. It was released on 17 July 2026 via False Idols. Self-produced, it features guest appearances from Mitch Sanders, Christian Pattemore, Marta Zlakowska, Radana and Run Red Rambo.

In the United Kingdom, the album peaked at number 18 on both the Scottish Albums Chart and Official Physical Albums Chart, number 16 on the Official Albums Sales Chart, number 8 on the Official Album Downloads Chart, number 17 on the Official Vinyl Albums Chart, number 10 on the Official Record Store Chart, and number 4 on the Official Independent Albums Chart. It also made it to number 31 on the Swiss Hitparade, number 90 on the Ultratop Wallonia, and number 119 in France.

== Critical reception ==
Professional ratings
Aggregate scores
Source	Rating
AnyDecentMusic?	6.9/10
Metacritic	72/100
Review scores
Source	Rating
AllMusic	3/5 stars
The Arts Desk	4/5 stars
Beats Per Minute	77/100
Clash	7/10
Exclaim!	7/10
The Line of Best Fit	5/10
MusicOMH	4/5 stars
Pitchfork	7.2/10
PopMatters	7/10
Record Collector	4/5 stars

Different When It's Silent was met with generally favorable reviews from music critics. At Metacritic, which assigns a normalized rating out of 100 to reviews from mainstream publications, the album received an average score of 72 based on twelve reviews. The aggregator AnyDecentMusic? has the critical consensus of the album at a 6.9 out of 10, based on thirteen reviews.

Ben Hogwood of musicOMH praised the album, calling it "a struggle, but one that ultimately emerges as a single beam of light to become Tricky's keenest, most original work in a long while". Jeremy Allen of Record Collector resumed: "Bristol artist Mitch Sanders sings the top lines with a haunting falsetto not a million miles from Beth Gibbons, while Tricky's almost undetectable growls – mostly about pain – underpin these raw, emotive songs". Ljubinko Zivkovic of Beats Per Minute stated: "on evidence of 14 songs here, intentionally or instinctively, he does care and keeps pushing the boundaries. That pushing might not be in leaps and bounds that came with his earliest solo work, but is still there and in audible increments". Ben Cardew of Pitchfork wrote: "perhaps inevitably, the record isn't as vital to the listener as it feels like it is to Tricky—and probably never could be—but after the darkly desperate Fall to Pieces, Tricky's punchy, punky album is further evidence of a career renaissance rooted in emotional power and musical exorcism". Sam Walker-Smart of Clash observed: "as ever, he's made an album that feels both fresh yet nostalgic". Tom Beedham of Exclaim! concluded: "Tricky has spent three decades dissolving himself into other people's voices, using absence as a way of speaking for him. It's encouraging to think that, in Sanders, he's found another channel through which he can show up for himself". Brian Stout of PopMatters remarked: "Different When It's Silent is an intriguing listen, showing that Tricky is still aces at selecting collaborators and capable of delivering a compelling left turn".

In mixed reviews, AllMusic's Paul Simpson wrote: "while Tricky mainly looms in the background, he's upfront during closing track "Out of Place", a punkish rush with frequent collaborator Marta Złakowska. Strings and an eerie operatic sample surface near the end, but the song frustratingly fades out as abruptly as it begins, ending the album right when it felt like a refreshing change of pace was about to occur". Joshua Mills of The Line of Best Fit stated: "therein lies this issue with this record. To paraphrase Lunchlady Doris, there's very little Tricky on this Tricky album".

== Track listing ==
No.	Title	Length
1.	"Still See Me There" (featuring Mitch Sanders)	3:39
2.	"I'm Yours" (featuring Mitch Sanders)	2:35
3.	"Be Still in the Pain" (featuring Mitch Sanders and Run Red Rambo)	3:21
4.	"I Tried" (featuring Mitch Sanders)	2:15
5.	"So Cold" (featuring Mitch Sanders)	2:38
6.	"Paris Maybe" (featuring Mitch Sanders)	2:52
7.	"Cannon Fodder" (featuring Mitch Sanders)	2:47
8.	"Because I Don't Know" (featuring Mitch Sanders)	4:33
9.	"Marinade" (featuring Mitch Sanders)	3:19
10.	"Radana" (featuring Mitch Sanders and Radana)	3:09
11.	"Piano" (featuring Mitch Sanders)	2:42
12.	"Frontier Town" (featuring Christian Pattemore)	1:39
13.	"Hengrove Blues" (featuring Mitch Sanders)	2:53
14.	"Out of Place" (featuring Marta)	2:45
Total length:		41:07

== Charts ==
Chart (2026)	Peak position
French Albums (SNEP)	119
Belgian Albums (Ultratop Wallonia)	90
Scottish Albums (Official Charts)	18
Swiss Albums (Schweizer Hitparade)	31
UK Independent Albums (Official Charts)	4
