= Lexi Jayde =

American actress and singer (born 2002)

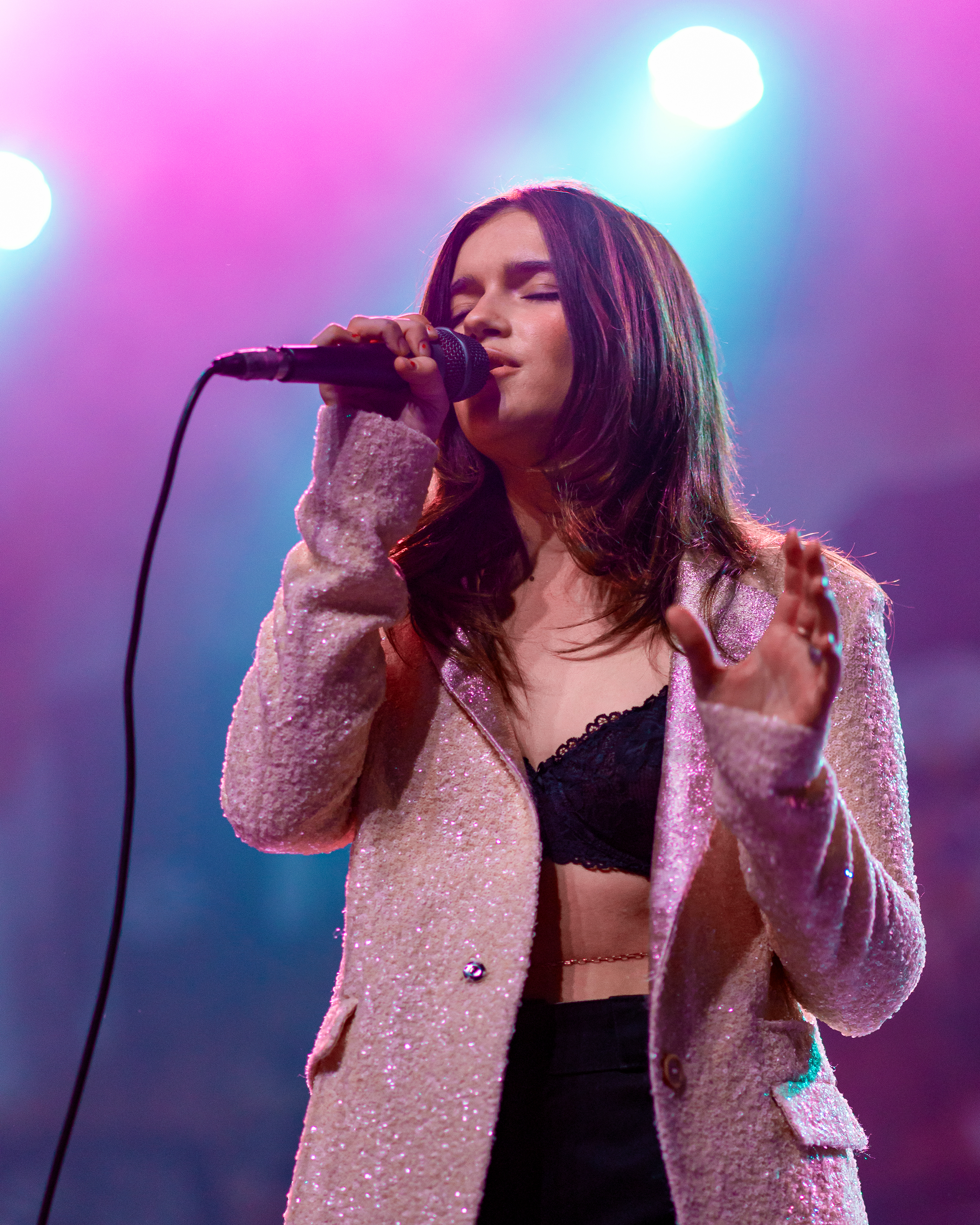
- Jayde performing at The Fonda Theatre, 2022
- Born: Alexis Jayde Burnett; August 19, 2002 (age 24); Los Angeles, California, U.S.
- Occupations: Singer-songwriter; actress
- Years active: 2012–present
- Musical career
- Genre: Pop
- Labels: Artist Partner Group; Columbia
- Website: www.lexijaydemusic.com

Alexis Jayde Burnett (born August 19, 2002), better known as Lexi Jayde is an American singer-songwriter and actress. She is best known for her 2022 single "Drunk Text Me", which went viral on TikTok. Jayde released her debut album Lover Girl in August 2026. She has gained over 1.2 million followers on Instagram, where she likes to connect with her audience.

== Early life ==
Jayde was born on August 19, 2002, in Los Angeles, California. Her father is Brock Burnett, an actor best known for his role as Bruce Patman in the first season of Sweet Valley High. Jayde began writing music at the age of six and did musical theater as a child.

In 2021 she enrolled in the University of Southern California.

== Career ==
=== 2012–2019: Junior Hollywood reporter and acting ===
According to her family, Jayde's first role was as a baby in a crib in a bank commercial that aired in the Midwest. Around 2009 she started acting as a junior reporter for a teen magazine, documenting red carpets.

She was first noticed by director Michael Feifer, who first included her as an extra in the 2012 film Stolen Child, as well starring her in her first major role in the movie Lucky Dog, alongside Bryce Johnson and Boti Bliss.

=== 2019–present: Music ===
Her first recorded song was a cover of "Baby, It's Cold Outside", which she performed with Emery Kelly of boy band Forever in Your Mind. Her first single, "If I Really Love You", came out in February 2020 and quickly reached a million streams. During the following year Jayde would sign with her label, APG, as well as be featured on a song by Goody Grace and Cigarettes After Sex. Her debut EP, A Teenage Diary (stylized in all lowercase), came out on July 23, 2021, and featured her biggest single at the time, "Newbury Park".

Her second EP, Closer to Closure, was released on May 26, 2022.

== Influences ==
Jayde has cited Fleetwood Mac, Taylor Swift, Billy Joel, Elton John, Queen, Prince, Kacey Musgraves, and Lorde as inspirations. She writes about her past experiences, stating "Hearing the final product of a song is kind of like closure for me, whereas I never found that in other things. Songwriting is so beautiful in so many ways, and I'm forever grateful for it". Several of her songs tackle the subject of 'growing up too fast', which resulted from Jayde being involved in the industry since a very young age.

== Discography ==
=== Studio albums ===
List of studio albums, with selected details shown
| Title | Details |
|---|---|
| Lover Girl | Released: August 21, 2026; Label: Columbia; Format: digital download, streaming |

=== EPs ===
List of EPs, with selected details shown
| Title | Details |
|---|---|
| A Teenage Diary | Released: July 23, 2021; Label: Artist Partner Group |
| Closer to Closure | Released: May 26, 2022; Label: Artist Partner Group |

=== Singles ===
List of singles as lead artist, with year released and album name shown
| Title | Year | Album |
|---|---|---|
| "If I Really Love You" | 2020 | Non-album singles |
| "Oldest Teenager" | 2020 | Non-album singles |
| "Newbury Park" | 2021 | A Teenage Diary |
| "Running in Place" | 2021 | A Teenage Diary |
| "Bedroom Walls" | 2021 | A Teenage Diary |
| "Walkin Away" | 2021 | Non-album single |
| "Drunk Text Me" | 2022 | Closer to Closure |
| "What's the Matter With You" | 2022 | Non-album singles |
| "Santa Baby" | 2022 | Non-album singles |
| "Bandages" | 2023 | Non-album singles |
| "You're Still Mine" | 2026 | Lover Girl |
| "Such a Bitch!" | 2026 | Lover Girl |
| "I've Missed You Longer" | 2026 | Lover Girl |
| "Delusional" | 2026 | Lover Girl |

== Filmography ==
=== Film ===
| Year | Title | Role | Notes |
|---|---|---|---|
| 2012 | Stolen Child | Student | |
| 2013 | Wednesday the 13th | Wednesday Addams | Short film |
| 2015 | Lucky Dog | Emma | |
| 2016 | Boys | Katie | Short film |
| 2018 | Ghosts | | |
| 2019 | Lit | Cassie | Short film |
| 2020 | My Daughter's Psycho Friend | Erin | |
| 2021 | Secrets in the Water | Mia | |

=== Television ===
| Year | Title | Role | Notes |
|---|---|---|---|
| 2018 | Alexa & Katie | Kim | Episode: "Shop 'Til You Cry" |
| 2019 | Teens Wanna Know | Herself | Episode: "Kaylyn Slevin's Sneaker Ball" |
| 2019–2020 | Crown Lake | Lucy Quinn | Main role (season 2) |

=== Music videos ===
| Year | Title | Artist | Role |
|---|---|---|---|
| 2017 | "Bohemian Rhapsody" | Samantha Gangal | Hero Girl |
