= In Endless Awe & Agony =

Studio album by Daine
- Released: 6 November 2026
- Recorded: 2024 – March 2026
- Genres: Alternative rock; indie rock; emo pop; hyperpop; power pop; synth pop; twee pop
- Length: 37:28
- Label: Pack
- Producers: Aldn; Darcy Baylis; Art Doherty; Gabe Greenland; Simon Lam; Ezekiel Padmanbham; Curtis Everett Pawley; Morgan Wright

Daine chronology
I Want the Light to Swallow Me Whole (2025)	In Endless Awe & Agony (2026)

Singles from In Endless Awe & Agony
- 1. "PQC" Released: 16 June 2026; 2. "Love Love (Love Love)" Released: 15 July 2026; 3. "I Used to Kill" Released: 12 August 2026; 4. "Product of Profit (P.O.P)" Released: September 9, 2026; 5. "Wishing Well" Released: 7 October 2026

Professional ratings
Aggregate scores
Source	Rating
Metacritic	74/100
Review scores
Source	Rating
The Line of Best Fit	8/10
NME	4/5 stars
Paste	B−
Pitchfork	6.8/10

In Endless Awe & Agony is the debut studio album by Australian singer Daine, released on 6 November 2026, through Pack Records.

== Track listing ==
Credits adapted from liner notes.

In Endless Awe & Agony track listing
No.	Title	Writer(s)	Producer(s)	Length
1.	"Silly Little Animal / Go!"	Darcy Baylis; Art Doherty; Ezeikel Padmanabham; Curtis Everett Pawley; Daine Lauren Wright	Baylis; Padmanabham; Pawley	3:32
2.	"White Collar"	D. Wright; Padmanabham	Padmanabham; Pawley^{[a]}	3:12
3.	"Product of Profit (P.O.P)"	Baylis; Doherty; Simon Lam; D. Wright; Morgan Wright	Baylis; Lam^{[a]}; Pawley; M. Wright	3:29
4.	"Wishing Well"	Lam; D. Wright	Baylis; Lam; Pawley	3:53
5.	"God Figure"	Baylis; Lam; Pawley; D. Wright	Baylis; Lam; Pawley	4:10
6.	"PQC"	Baylis; Doherty; Pawley; D. Wright	Baylis; Pawley	3:32
7.	"I Used to Kill" (with Aldn)	Alden Gardner Robinson; Gabe Greenland; Pawley; D. Wright	Aldn; Baylis; Greenland; Pawley	3:34
8.	"Love Love (Love Love)"	Lucy Blomkamp; Pawley; D. Wright	Baylis; Blomkamp^{[a]}; Pawley	3:07
9.	"(I Want You in) Dakota"	Doherty; Lam; Pawley; D. Wright	Baylis; Doherty; Lam; Pawley	3:12
10.	"Supervillain"	Baylis; Doherty; Lam; Pawley; D. Wright	Baylis; Doherty; Lam^{[a]}; Pawley	2:58
11.	"Spider-man"	D. Wright; Baylis	Baylis^{[a]}; Padmanabham; Pawley	2:49
Total length:				37:28

Notes

- ^{^[a]} signifies an additional producer
