= Post Script =

Studio album (disputed) by the Fall
- Released: 2 October 2026
- Length: 44:18
- Label: Cog Sinister

The Fall chronology
New Facts Emerge (2017)	Post Script (2026)

Post Script is an album attributed to post-punk band the Fall. Announced in June 2026, the album was released on 2 October 2026 through Cog Sinister/Gonzo.

Featuring unused vocal recordings of the band's founder and frontman Mark E. Smith dating from 2001 to 2014, the album was recorded and assembled by Ed Blaney (the band's manager from 2000 to 2004) and Simon "Ding" Archer (the band's bassist from 2003 to 2004).

It is disputed whether the album can be legitimately attributed to the Fall. Pamela Vander, Smith's fiancée and the band's manager at the time of his death, has objected to the release of the album.

== Release and promotion ==
Post Script was announced on Facebook in early June 2026. The lead single, "30 Degrees", was released on 14 June 2026 and was reportedly co-written by Smith, Archer, and Blaney.

Post Script's legitimacy as a Fall album is disputed. Pamela Vander, Smith's fiancée and the band's manager at the time of his death, called the album "a cash grab, just a collection of some shit from the cutting room floor". However, the estate of Mark E. Smith approved the album for release.

Blaney described Post Script as the "official and final studio album" by the band. Archer wrote in a post on Facebook that the album would consist of "unheard studio recordings", and defended the use of The Fall name, saying "If you’re not convinced, don’t buy it."

== Critical reception ==
Professional ratings
Review scores
Source	Rating
Louder Than War	4.5/5 stars
Mojo	3/5 stars

In The Wire, Tony Herrington described Post Script as "a wholly cynical exercise on the part of individuals...having no obvious moral or artistic claim on The Fall group name." He wrote that compared to earlier Fall albums, Post Script "sounds literally dead."

In a 4.5-star review for Louder Than War, John Robb wrote that "This is not The Fall. It is something else entirely — a phoenix dragged from the ashes, a new and strange beast, and ultimately a fitting epitaph for Smith and these lost vocal takes."

== Track listing ==
Post Script track listing
No.	Title	Length
1.	"30 Degrees"	4:02
2.	"So Long"	4:07
3.	"Colonel's Retreat"	5:02
4.	"Caveat"	4:09
5.	"Final Position"	5:31
6.	"Retro Song"	4:09
7.	"Irish Northern Man"	7:02
8.	"Dehydrated"	3:54
9.	"The Book"	6:22
Total length:		44:18

== Personnel ==
- Mark E. Smith – vocals, production
- Ed Blaney – guitar, vocals, production
- Simon "Ding" Archer – bass, guitar, keyboards, production

== Charts ==
Chart performance for Post Script
Chart (2026)	Peak position
Scottish Albums (Official Charts)	27
UK Albums Sales (Official Charts)	15
UK Homegrown (Official Charts)	12
UK Independent Albums (Official Charts)	7
