= Daine (singer) =

Filipino-Australian musician

daine
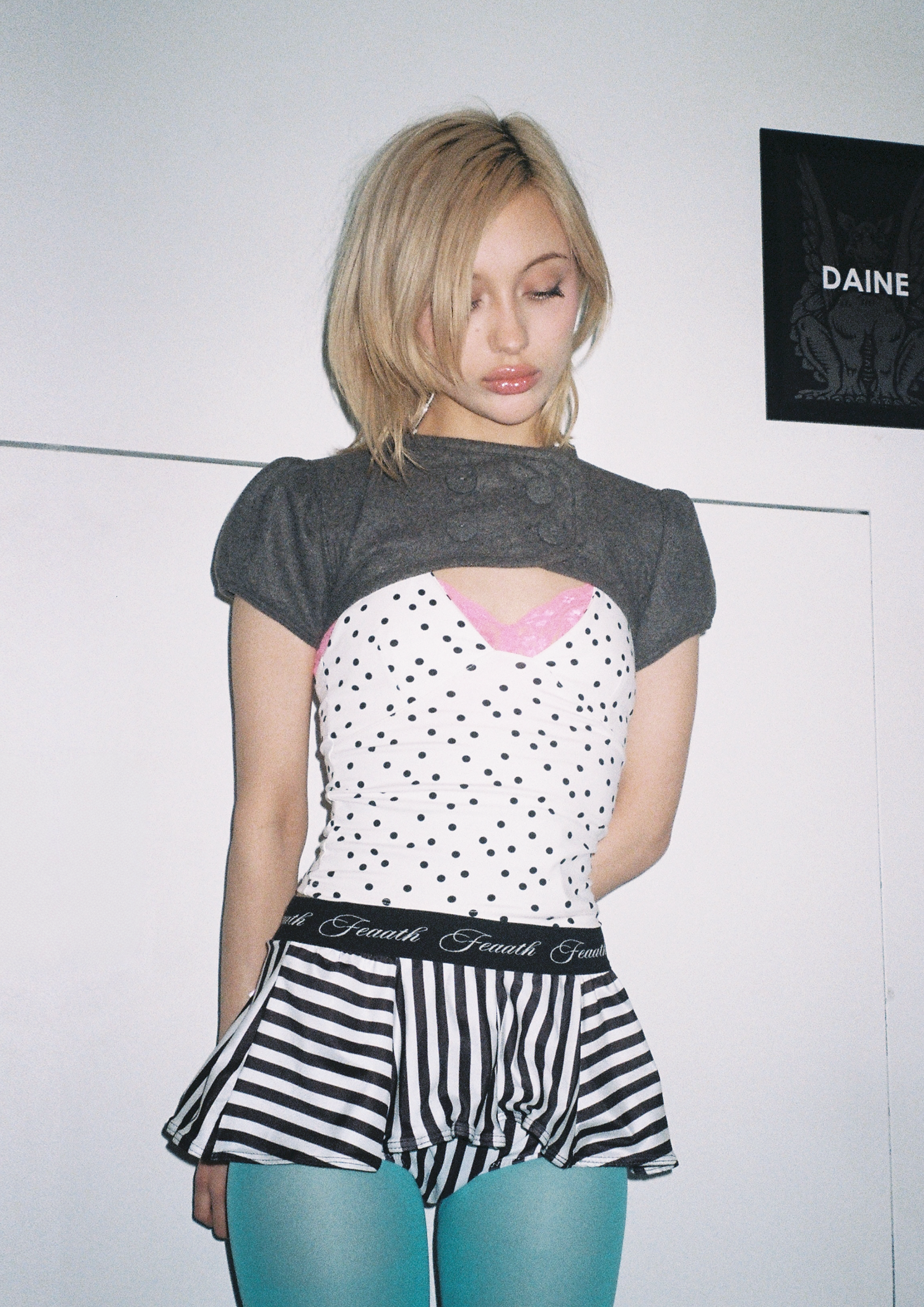

Background information
- Born: Daine Lauren Wright; 20 November 2002 (age 23); Werribee, Victoria, Australia
- Genre: Hyperpop
- Instruments: Vocals; guitar
- Years active: 2020–present
- Labels: Warner Music Australia; Pack

Daine Lauren Wright (born 20 November 2002), known mononymously as Daine (stylized as daine), is an Australian singer, songwriter and producer. They (Note: Daine is non-binary and uses they/them pronouns. For consistency, this article uses they/them.) released their debut album, In Endless Awe & Agony, in 2026.

== Early life ==
Daine was raised in Melbourne, Victoria. They are Filipino Australian. Growing up, they resonated with the midwest emo and screamo genres, showing interest in bands like American Football, Foxing, Midwest Pen Pals and The Exploration.

== Career ==
They released their debut single "Picking Flowers" on15 May 2020, during the beginning of the COVID-19 pandemic. This single was quickly picked up by V Magazine as "an E-girl bop", putting "daine" out as a public persona. Shortly after, on 17 July 2020, they would release their second single "My Way Out", which "signifi[ed] music as an escape from socialization and school."

Daine released the single "Ascension" on 28 October 2020 with an announcement for the lineup of livestream music event Nocturne Halloween, consisting of LAN Party, Brevin Kim, Ethel Cain, Daine, Glasear & Ericdoa and Lil Aaron. Shortly after they would release "Angel Numbers" on 12 November 2020 for a double A-side single. In December 2020 they would officially release "Bloody Knees" after a 'nitecore' version received support from a large audience, including Charli XCX.

Throughout 2021, Daine would continue to publish music under Warner Music, with notable collaborations including Ericdoa on "boys wanna txt" and Oli Sykes on "SALT". They would play their first live show in June, at Yarraville's Kindred Ballroom.

They released their debut extended play (EP) titled "Quantum Jumping" in April 2022, which featured the two singles, "cemetery dreams" and "IDC". All the songs on "Quantum Jumping" were written years prior to their eventual release, with the EP acting as a "tombstone to their adolescence".

Daine released "boythots" on 11 August 2022, moving into a more pop-adjacent sound, citing mentor Charli XCX as "the first female pop artist I really fucked with". This trend would carry into 2023, when they released "writhe" as a single off their second EP "shapeless" which released on February 24, 2023. Throughout 2023, they would continue their shift towards pop with "BITE BACK" (with a remix by KAVARI) and "CUT MY HEART OUT". In late 2023, they would write "It's You" with Ninajirachi.

In 2025, Daine would release the singles "eighteen", "payphone" and "i want the light to swallow me whole", which became songs on their EP "i want the light to swallow me whole". During this time, they would tour with Yeule across Europe and the UK. With the release of Ninajirachi's "I Love My Computer", Daine received recognition for their performance on "It's You", quickly becoming their most popular song to date. With a remix from Underscores later that year, Daine would continue to gain traction from more mainstream media sources.

In 2026, Daine would go on to announce their debut album. The first single to release off the album was "PQC", which was recognised as optimistic pop. While opening Ninajirachi's 2026 Australian tour, Dark Crystal 5, they released "Love Love (Love Love)", as well as announcing their debut album In Endless Awe & Agony. The third single to be released off their debut album was "I Used to Kill" with Aldn, later followed by the fourth single "Product of Profit (P.O.P.)", and the fifth, "Wishing Well".

== Personal life ==
Daine has postural orthostatic tachycardia syndrome (POTS), Ehlers–Danlos syndrome, and autism. Daine uses they/them pronouns.^{[3]} Daine has been a vegan since they were 13.

== Discography ==
Studio Albums
Title	Details
In Endless Awe & Agony	Released 6 November 2026; Label: Pack Records; Format: LP, digital download, streaming

Extended Plays
Title	Details
Quantum Jumping	Released 28 April 2022; Label: Warner Music Australia; Format: digital download, streaming
Shapeless	Released February 2023; Label: Warner Music Australia; Format: digital download, streaming
I Want the Light to Swallow Me Whole	Released 13 June 2025; Label: Pack Records; Format: digital download, streaming
