= Tungsten (band) =

Swedish metal band

Background information
- Also known as: Strokkur (2016–2018)
- Origin: Sweden
- Genres: Industrial metal; power metal; symphonic metal; folk metal
- Years active: 2016–present
- Labels: Arising Empire; Reigning Phoenix Music
- Members: Anders Johansson; Mike Andersson; Karl Johansson; Nick Johansson
- Website: tungstenofficial.net

Tungsten is a Swedish metal band formed by ex-HammerFall drummer Anders Johansson and his two sons.

== History ==
Anders founded the band in 2016, together with his sons Nick and Karl Johansson. They were later joined by Swedish vocalist Mike Andersson, following which the recording of their first album started. The band was originally called "Strokkur", and they released a demo album entitled Vantablack, with many of the tracks being demo versions of songs from their later albums. Once they signed with Arising Empire, the record label insisted that the band change their name, and after some difficulty, they ultimately decided on Anders' suggestion, "Tungsten", named after the chemical element also called "Wolfram".

Tungsten's debut album, We Will Rise, was released on 20 September 2019. Rock Hard Germany described the album as "carrying Nordic Folk Metal and predominant Power Metal elements, as well as influences like Rammstein or Modern Metal." The album contains songs titled "We Will Rise" and "The Fairies Dance", which were both published as singles before the album's release, as well as a song called "Misled", which was released on the same day as the album. All three songs were released as music videos.

In summer 2020, Tungsten was supposed to partake in the metal festival Sabaton Open Air as a supporting performer. However, due to the COVID-19 pandemic, the festival was postponed – at first to August 2021, and later to August 2022.

In 2020, the band released the singles "Life of the Ocean" and "Tundra", both of which were released as music videos. Later that year, on November the 27th, their second studio album called Tundra was published. The albums recording started in late 2019, with final vocals being completed by January 2020. The lyrics of the album tell the story of Volfram, the Guardian of time - who can be seen on the cover of the album - and his adventure through an icy tundra. A guest appearance on Tundra was made by Jens Johansson, Anders's brother, who is known as the keyboardist of bands such as Rainbow and Stratovarius. He can be heard performing a keyboard solo on the albums closing track, "Here Comes the Fall".

In 2022, the band released the singles "Come This Way" on January 28 and "March Along" on March 3, highlighting the release of their new album Bliss, which came out on June 17, 2022.

== Members ==
Current members

- Mike Andersson – lead vocals
- Karl Johansson – bass, keyboards, unclean vocals
- Nick Johansson – guitar
- Anders Johansson – drums

Timeline

== Discography ==
=== Studio albums ===
- We Will Rise (2019)
- Tundra (2020)
- Bliss (2022)
- The Grand Inferno (2024)
- Ashes (2026)

=== Demo album ===
- Vantablack (2017) (as Strokkur)

=== Singles ===
- "We Will Rise" (2019)
- "The Fairies Dance" (2019)
- "Misled" (2019)
- "King of Shadows" (2020)
- "Life and the Ocean" (2020)
- "Tundra" (2020)
- "Come This Way" (2022)
- "March Along" (2022)
- "Bliss" (2022)
- "On The Sea" (2022)
- "Walborg" (2024)
- "Blood of the Kings" (2024)
- "Vantablack" (2024)
- "Lullaby" (2024)
- "The Grand Inferno" (2024)
- "Cry For The Fallen" (2025)

=== Music videos ===
- "We Will Rise" (2019)
- "The Fairies Dance" (2019)
- "Misled" (2019)
- "King of Shadows" (2020)
- "Life and the Ocean" (2020)
- "Tundra" (2020)
- "Come This Way" (2022)
- "March Along" (2022)
- "Dreamers" (2022)
- "Walborg" (2024)
- "Blood of the Kings" (2024)
- "Vantablack" (2024)
- "Lullaby" (2024)
- "The Grand Inferno" (2024)
