= Ashes (Tungsten album) =

Studio album by Tungsten
- Released: 9 October 2026
- Recorded: 2025–2026
- Genres: Industrial metal, power metal
- Length: 39:30
- Label: Reigning Phoenix
- Producer: Nick Johansson

Tungsten chronology
The Grand Inferno (2024)	Ashes (2026)

Singles from Ashes
- 1. "Bite My Tongue" Released: 6 February 2026; 2. "Joker" Released: 9 May 2026; 3. "Sunshine of Fall" Released: 26 June 2026; 4. "Fuego Del Sol" Released: 6 August 2026

Professional ratings
Review scores
Source	Rating
Arrow Lords of Metal	8/10
Metal on Tap	8/10
Powermetal.de	9.5/10

Ashes is the fifth studio album by Swedish metal band Tungsten, released on 9 October 2026. Singles were released in advance for some songs including "Sunshine of Fall" and "Fuego Del Sol".

== Track listing ==
No.	Title	Length
1.	"Joker"	3:41
2.	"Bite My Tongue"	3:22
3.	"Fuego Del Sol"	3:51
4.	"Supernova"	3:36
5.	"Happy"	3:34
6.	"Ted the Exorcist"	3:23
7.	"Sunshine of Fall"	3:38
8.	"The North Will Rise" (featuring Tony Kakko)	3:22
9.	"For Thee"	3:08
10.	"Ruin"	4:08
11.	"The Forge"	3:47

== Personnel ==
- Mike Andersson – clean vocals
- Nick Johansson – guitars
- Karl Johansson – bass, keyboards, harsh vocals
- Anders Johansson – drums
