= Age of the Exhibitionist =

2026 studio album by Rebecca Black

Studio album by Rebecca Black
- Released: September 4, 2026
- Recorded: 2024–2025
- Genre: Dance-pop
- Length: 37:58
- Label: Self-released
- Producers: ATLGrandma; Marcus Andersson; Chris Lyon; Nightfeelings; Oscar Scheller; Starsmith

Rebecca Black chronology
Salvation (2025)	Age of the Exhibitionist (2026)

Singles from Age of the Exhibitionist
- 1. "Speakerphone" Released: June 12, 2026; 2. "Hot Wet Delirious" Released: July 10, 2026; 3. "Michael." Released: August 7, 2026; 4. "Anaheim Star" Released: August 31, 2026

Age of the Exhibitionist is the second studio album by the American singer Rebecca Black. It was released on September 4, 2026. The album became her first project to chart in any country, charting at number 75 on the UK Album Downloads Chart.

== Background ==
The song "Miss Delicious" was written shortly after she wrote "Sugar Water Cyanide" for Salvation (2025). The songs "Metamorphia" and “Hot Wet Delirious” were finished a few weeks after she concluded her opening act appearances for Katy Perry's the Lifetimes Tour.

== Composition and lyrics ==
The album is primarily dance-pop, with elements of hyperpop and R&B. The lyrics discuss themes such as lust and sexuality.

"Michael." originated from a conversation she was having with her producers. "We were in the middle of doing something else and thought what if we switched it up and tried something? I don’t know why, but we got on this tangent of talking about Lady Gaga's fiancé, Michael Polansky", before stating the song started as a joke", Black said in an interview with Entertainment Weekly.

"Exhibitionism" includes a drum sample from Mark Van Hoen's ambient band Locust song "Your Selfish Ways". Van Hoen received a composer credit on the track.

== Release and promotion ==
A tour to promote the album titled "Exhibitionism on Tour" was announced on July 19, 2026, featuring her shows at All Things Go 2026, as well as weekend one of Austin City Limits 2026. The tour dates also included an appearance at the inaugural For You Festival located in Irvine, California and several dates across Canada. The album's fourth single, "Anaheim Star", was debuted on Apple Music 1's The Zane Lowe Show.

== Critical reception ==
Professional ratings
Aggregate scores
Source	Rating
Metacritic	67/100
Review scores
Source	Rating
Beats Per Minute	61%
Sputnikmusic	3.8/5

According to the review aggregator Metacritic, Age of the Exhibitionist received "generally favorable reviews" based on a weighted average score of 67 out of 100 from 4 critic scores. Caleb Robinson of Sputnikmusic wrote that the album lacked "some of the more unique qualities that her past work had" but was "some of Black's finest work to date".

== Track listing ==
Age of the Exhibitionist track listing
No.	Title	Writer(s)	Producer(s)	Length
1.	"Anaheim Star"	Rebecca Black; JBach; Jesse Saint John; Nick Weiss	Nightfeelings	2:46
2.	"Hot Wet Delirious"	Black; Nawab Arzoo; Anu Malik; Saint John; Oscar Scheller	Nightfeelings; Scheller	3:08
3.	"Exhibitionism"	Black; Marcus Andersson; Lauren Aquilina; Zoe Niblett; Mark Van Hoen; Weiss	Andersson; Chris Lyon; Nightfeelings	3:37
4.	"Corsetry"	Black; ATLGrandma; Leland; Saint John	ATLGrandma	3:33
5.	"Miss Delicious"	Black; Saint John; Scheller; Weiss	Nightfeelings; Scheller	3:21
6.	"Pistol"	Black; Saint John; Scheller; Weiss	Nightfeelings; Scheller	3:14
7.	"Backstage Baby Interlude"	Black; Saint John; Scheller; Weiss	Nightfeelings; Scheller	1:38
8.	"Michael."	Black; Andersson; Aquilina; Weiss	Andersson; Nightfeelings	3:32
9.	"Visions Again"	Black; Andersson; Aquilina; ATLGrandma; Saint John; Weiss	Andersson; Nightfeelings; ATLGrandma	3:42
10.	"Waschesalon"	Black; Andersson; Aquilina; Fin Dow-Smith	Andersson; Starsmith	3:12
11.	"Metamorphia"	Black; JBach; Slush Puppy	Slush Puppy	3:35
12.	"Speakerphone"	Black; JBach; Saint John; Weiss	Nightfeelings	2:41
Total length:				37:58

== Charts ==
Chart performance
Chart (2026)	Peak position
UK Album Downloads (Official Charts)	75

== Release history ==
Release history
Date	Format(s)	Label(s)	Ref.
September 4, 2026	LP; music download; streaming	Self-released	
