= You Say I Romanticize =

Studio album by Sweeping Promises
- Released: August 14, 2026
- Studios: Home studio, Lawrence, Kansas
- Length: 34:00
- Label: Sub Pop
- Producer: Sweeping Promises

Sweeping Promises chronology
Good Living Is Coming for You (2023)	You Say I Romanticize (2026)

Professional ratings
Review scores
Source	Rating
AllMusic	4/5 stars
Paste	B
Pitchfork	7.5/10

You Say I Romanticize is the third studio album by the American rock duo Sweeping Promises. It was released on August 14, 2026, by Sub Pop. The album was recorded at the band's home studio in Lawrence, Kansas, with touring drummer Spenser Gralla participating in the sessions.

== Background and recording ==
You Say I Romanticize was written and recorded at Lira Mondal and Caufield Schnug's home studio in Lawrence, Kansas, the same studio used during the recording of the band's previous album, Good Living Is Coming for You. The album was developed over approximately 18 months without an outside producer or commercial studio.

The band sought to more closely reproduce the sound of its live performances, with touring drummer Spenser Gralla participating in the recording. Whereas Sweeping Promises' previous albums had been recorded using one or two microphones, the album employed a multi-microphone setup that Schnug described as a form of "chamber recording". Schnug nevertheless continued to emphasize the sound of musicians performing together in a room, retaining microphone bleed and the studio's natural reverberation rather than isolating individual instruments or extensively correcting performances digitally.

== Composition and themes ==
Mondal and Schnug incorporated more synthesizers and electronic music into You Say I Romanticize than on their previous albums, with Schnug saying that the band had become "a little less afraid of pop music". Mondal said they nevertheless remained focused on melody and writing concise, catchy songs.

The album addresses authorship, idealism and artistic independence. Mondal said that its treatment of authorship concerned whose stories are told and who is able to hear them, connecting the theme to the decline of independent arts infrastructure and the economic pressures facing musicians. In The Line of Best Fit, Jess Arcand similarly described the album as exploring the power of documenting ideas, with its songs featuring writers, mystics and narrators continuing to create during periods of social instability.

Literary figures provided inspiration for several songs. Mary Shelley's 1826 novel The Last Man influenced the album and provided the title of the song "Last Man", while "My Anchoress" draws on the life of Julian of Norwich. Mondal drew a parallel between Julian's seclusion and Patti Smith's emphasis on private space for writing.

Political anxiety also appears on the album. Mondal said that "Shooting Shadows" developed partly from concerns about surveillance and safety amid increased activity by U.S. Immigration and Customs Enforcement. Soutar identified paranoia as a recurring characteristic of both the album's lyrics and production.

The album's title comes from a lyric in the closing track, "Write Lightly". Mondal described the phrase as an accusation against the song's narrator for using her imagination, documenting her life and envisioning a better world. Schnug also noted that the abbreviation "YSIR" resembles "yes, sir"; Mondal associated the abbreviation with subservience and compliance.

== Critical reception ==
You Say I Romanticize received positive reviews from music critics, several of whom viewed its fuller sound as an expansion of Sweeping Promises' earlier lo-fi recordings. Heather Phares of AllMusic wrote that the album bridged the band's murkier studio sound with the more aggressive character of its live performances, describing it as possibly their most consistent and certainly their most electrifying album. Elise Soutar of Pitchfork gave the album a 7.5 out of 10, praising its denser arrangements and layered vocals, while Luke Cartledge of Paste gave it a B and identified Mondal's vocal versatility as the band's greatest strength, although he felt the album's increased consistency diminished some of the unpredictability of their earlier work. Christopher Raley of Glide Magazine similarly praised the fuller production, Gralla's drumming and Mondal's bass and vocals, regarding the album as an expansion of the band's sound that retained its punk aesthetic.

== Track listing ==
All lyrics are written by Lira Mondal; all music is composed by Sweeping Promises.

You Say I Romanticize track listing
No.	Title	Length
1.	"Shooting Shadows"	2:45
2.	"My Friend's an Entomologist"	3:47
3.	"Last Man"	3:35
4.	"Rapture, or..."	3:38
5.	"Abduction on Camera"	3:28
6.	"My Anchoress"	3:30
7.	"Cocoon"	2:54
8.	"Accent"	3:57
9.	"Does He Want to Be the Weatherman?"	2:50
10.	"Write Lightly"	3:36
Total length:		34:00

== Personnel ==
Credits are adapted from the album's liner notes and Tidal.

=== Sweeping Promises ===
- Lira Mondal – vocals, arrangements, bass guitar, synthesizer, production, violin on "Rapture, or...", Fender Rhodes piano on "My Anchoress"
- Caufield Schnug – arrangements, acoustic guitar, guitars, synthesizer, production, engineering, mixing, mastering

=== Additional contributors ===
- Spenser Gralla – drums
- Claire Monroe – art
