= Starcleaner Reunion =

American indie pop band

Starcleaner Reunion is an American indie pop band from New York City.

== History ==
The group released their first EP in 2022 titled Club Estrella. In 2024, the group released their second EP titled Cafe Life. Prior to the release of the album, the group released the singles, and Plein Air was featured on Pitchfork's "This Week's Pitchfork Selects" playlist.

== Discography ==
EPs

- Club Estrella (2022, Happen Twice)
- Cafe Life (2024, self released)

Studio Albums

Umbrella (2026)
