= Cocoon (EP) =

COCOON

EP by Yeat
- Released: September 18, 2026
- Length: 16:49
- Labels: Lyfestyle; Field Trip; Capitol
- Producers: Yeat; Bass; CoreyStax; Froodough; Kaaj; Luc1us; Lucid; MGTheKid; Noel Cadastre; Orin; Perdu; Synthetic; Tjay; Trgc

Yeat chronology
ADL (2026)	COCOON (2026)	Luh Leakyz Vol. 1 (2026)

Cocoon (stylized in all caps) is the eighth extended play (EP) by American rapper Yeat. It was released through Lyfestyle Corporation, Field Trip Recordings, and Capitol Records on September 18, 2026. It includes a collaboration with Canadian rapper Drake.

Cocoon is a rage rap EP that sees Yeat return to his older style while also incorporating pop sensibilities throughout. Upon release, the EP received mixed to negative reviews, with music journalists praising the Drake feature but criticizing Yeat's struggle to find his musical identity, his forced flow, and the sonic repetition throughout.

Upon release, Cocoon charted at number 88 on the Billboard 200, selling approximately 14,000 album equivalent units in its first week. It marks his ninth project to debut on the Billboard charts following the release of ADL.

== Background and release ==
COCOON was recorded during Yeat's 2026 Love/Lyfe tour, which supports his 2026 album ADL. The EP was first teased at the end of the music video for "On Nothing". "Miss My Dawg" was previewed in Canadian rapper Drake's short film Fear of Missing Out. Ahead of Cocoon's release, all of Yeat's album covers on streaming services were updated to match the EP's black and white aesthetic. After initially being advertised as a five-track EP set to release on September 17, 2026, it was released a day later with seven tracks. A music video for "Earned It", directed by Alex Edep, was released the same day.

== Composition ==
=== Overview ===
Cocoon is a seven-track rage-style EP that also features a blend of pop throughout. Seeing Yeat return to his old sonic roots, It features cohesive production and unpredictable rapping. According to Jeff Ihaza of Rolling Loud, he wrote that the project makes Yeat sound reminiscent of Travis Scott, stating that some tracks off the EP sound as if they were pulled from Scott's album Astroworld. Lyrically, the EP sees Yeat boast about his lifestyle while taking shots at his competition.

=== Songs ===
"Earned It" is a brash track where Yeat flaunts his lavish lifestyle while rapping over an edgy, "video-game-ready" beat. According to Ihaza, he wrote that the beginning sounds as if it were plucked from Travis Scott's Astroworld. On "Miss My Dawg" with Drake, it sees Yeat return to his SoundCloud flow. In contrast, the instrumental features "dramatic" and "cinematic" production and strong singing by Drake in his hook. According to Dominic and Ihaza, they both said the track is the "most convincing" one off the EP. On "Holy Water", Yeat falls flat on effort, according to Ihaza; the track sees Yeat in the first verse incorporate some of the "old absurdity" he had in his previous works. In contrast, the second half sees him become more repetitive, rapping “I don’t give a fuck ’bout shit.” On the title track "Cocoon", it features a steady and rhythmic flow that gets monotone and repetitive fast. According to Dominic, he said it sounds "straight up gibberish," while Ihaza called it straight up "slop".

== Critical reception ==
Professional ratings
Review scores
Source	Rating
AllMusic	3/5 stars
Ratings Game Music	3/5 stars
Rolling Stone	2/5 stars

Reviews for Cocoon were mixed to negative. According to Quincy Dominic of Ratings Game Music gave the EP three stars out of five, writing how the experimentation on the project can both be Yeat's strength and notable weakness, Dominic highlights the production labeling it cohesive, but finds Yeat's flow to be forced rather than natural. Despite this, he finds Cocoon to be a test of Yeat's artistic prowess. In a more negative review by Jeff Ihaza of Rolling Stone, he rated the EP a two out of five, writing how Cocoon has flashes of the old Yeat—especially on “Miss My Dawg” with Drake—but overall sounds repetitive, derivative, and caught between Yeat’s old rage style and newer/pop-oriented directions. He sees the EP less as a successful metamorphosis and more as Yeat struggling to figure out his musical identity. Complex listed Cocoon as one of the "15 best albums of 2026 so far".

== Commercial performance ==
Upon release, Cocoon was projected to sell 16,000 units in its first week. However, during the week of October 3, 2026, Cocoon charted at number 88 on the Billboard 200, selling approximately 14,000 album equivalent units in its first week, selling 2000 less than what it was projected to sell. It marks his ninth project to debut on the Billboard charts following the release of ADL.

== Track listing ==
No.	Title	Writer(s)	Producer(s)	Length
1.	"Earned It"	Noah Smith; Kaj Dellensen; Sebastiaan Bink	Yeat; Bass; Kaaj	2:31
2.	"In2That"	Smith; Dellensen; Bink	Bass; Kaaj	2:15
3.	"Miss My Dawg" (featuring Drake)	Smith; Aubrey Graham; Daniel Lee; Lucien Dunne; Lucius Lowe; Noel Cadastre	Froodough; Luc1us; Lucid; Noel Cadastre	3:08
4.	"Luh Birk"	Smith; Jack Baker; Jamarrius Hill; Trey Hedderly	Tjay; Trgc	1:39
5.	"Holy Water"	Smith; Javier Mercado; Louis Esposito; Orin Friedman	Yeat; Orin; Perdu; Synthetic	2:17
6.	"Cocoon"	Smith; Hill; Ivan Shnitkovskyi; Marcel Gipfel	Yeat; CoreyStax; MGTheKid; Trgc	1:58
7.	"Tennis"	Smith; Bink; Dellensen	Bass; Kaaj	2:59
Total length:				16:49

Notes

- All track titles are stylized in all caps.
- Tracks one, five, and seven, are stylized with diacritics.

== Personnel ==
These credits have been adapted from Spotify.

- Noah Smith – vocals, recording (all tracks); mixing, mastering (tracks 1, 3, 4, and 7)
- Benjamin Saint Fort – mixing, mastering (tracks 2, 5, and 6)
- Drake – vocals (track 3)

== Charts ==
Chart performance for Cocoon
Chart (2026)	Peak position
Australian Albums (ARIA)	62
Australian Hip Hop/R&B Albums (ARIA)	8
Canadian Albums (Billboard)	96
Lithuanian Albums (AGATA)	39
New Zealand Albums (RMNZ)	40
Polish Albums (ZPAV)	79
Portuguese Albums (AFP)	64
Swiss Albums (Schweizer Hitparade)	55
US Billboard 200	88
US Top R&B/Hip-Hop Albums (Billboard)	24
