= Lover Girl (Lexi Jayde album) =

Studio album by Lexi Jayde
- Released: August 21, 2026
- Length: 45:59
- Label: Columbia
- Producers: Leroy Clampitt; Stephen Conley; Carrie K; Sean Kennedy; Tommy King; Ryan Marrone; Nick Ruth; Jack Riley

Lexi Jayde chronology
Closer to Closure (2022)	Lover Girl (2026)

Singles from Lover Girl
- 1. "You're Still Mine" Released: June 5, 2026; 2. "Such a Bitch!" Released: June 26, 2026; 3. "I've Missed You Longer" Released: July 24, 2026; 4. "Delusional" Released: August 7, 2026

Lover Girl (stylized in all caps) is the debut studio album by the American singer-songwriter Lexi Jayde, released on August 21, 2026, through Columbia. Jayde's self-image anchors the album's variety of themes. the album serves as a follow up for Jayde's second EP ''closer to closure''. She interrogates the gap between the version of herself she presents and the one she lives with, and the album's emotional tension comes from trying to close that gap, as she finds love and heals.

== Background ==
Jayde announced her debut studio album in July 2026 with an August 21, 2026 release date. The album was preceded by three singles, lead single "You're Still Mine", released on June 5, 2026, "Such a Bitch!", released on June 26, 2026, and "I've Missed You Longer", released on July 24, 2026. The album's fourth single, "Delusional", was released on August 7, 2026.

== Track listing ==
Lover Girl track listing
No.	Title	Writer(s)	Producer(s)	Length
1.	"Sorry for You"	Alexis Jayde Burnett; Mags Duval; Tommy King	King	2:49
2.	"Delusional"	Burnett; King; Victoria Zaro	King	3:26
3.	"You're Still Mine"	Burnett	Nick Ruth	3:19
4.	"Misunderstood"	Burnett; King; Zaro	King; Eric Ruscinski^{[a]}	3:48
5.	"Jeans"	Burnett; Grace Enger; Lucy Healey	Ruth	2:53
6.	"Such a Bitch!"	Burnett; Stephen Conley; Ryan Marrone; MoZella	Conley; Marrone; Ruth^{[c]}	2:53
7.	"Bubblebath"	Burnett; Ruth; Mary Weitz	Ruth	3:47
8.	"I've Missed You Longer"	Burnett; Enger; Healey	Ruth	3:19
9.	"Easier"	Burnett; Enger; Carrie K	Carrie K	3:27
10.	"I Want Him Bad"	Burnett; Ruth	Ruth	3:14
11.	"Cool Girl, Tough Guy"	Burnett; Baby Nova; Jack Riley	Riley	3:32
12.	"Wanna Be"	Burnett; Enger; Healey	Ruth	2:53
13.	"When Does It End?"	Burnett; Sean Kennedy; Sarah Solovay	Kennedy	3:46
14.	"I Feel It All"	Burnett; Leroy Clampitt; Healey	Clampitt^{[p]}; Healey^{[a]}^{[v]}	2:53
Total length:				45:59

=== Notes ===
- ^{^[p]} signifies a producer and vocal producer
- ^{^[c]} signifies a co-producer
- ^{^[a]} signifies an additional producer
- ^{^[v]} signifies a vocal producer

== Personnel ==
Credits adapted from Tidal.

- Lexi Jayde – vocals (all tracks), background vocals (tracks 9, 13)
- Pedro Calloni – mixing, mastering
- Tommy King – bass, drums, piano, programming, synthesizer (1, 2, 4)
- Jon Yeston – percussion, engineering (1, 2, 4)
- Tyler Nuffer – pedal steel guitar (1, 2), electric guitar (2)
- Eric Ruscinski – acoustic guitar, electric guitar, additional engineering (2, 4)
- Nick Ruth – engineering (3, 5, 7, 8, 10, 12)
- Yi-Mei Templeman – strings (4, 14), cello (5, 7)
- Julien Altmann – viola, violin (5, 7)
- Grace Enger – background vocals (5, 8, 9, 12)
- Ryan Marrone – engineering (6)
- Stephen Conley – engineering (6)
- Aksel Coe – drums (7, 8, 10, 12)
- Carrie K – bass, drums, guitar, piano, engineering (9)
- Benjamin Kaufman – strings (9)
- Jack Riley – acoustic guitar, bass guitar, drums, electric guitar, engineering (11)
- Sean Kennedy – bass, guitar, programming, engineering (13)
- Sarah Solovay – background vocals (13)
- Leroy Clampitt – background vocals, bass, programming, engineering (14)
- Lucy Healey – background vocals, piano, engineering (14)
- Ben Barter – drums (14)
