= Sweeping Promises =

American rock band

- Origin: Boston, Massachusetts, U.S.
- Genres: Post-punk, indie rock, new wave
- Years active: 2019–present
- Label: Sub Pop
- Members: Lira Mondal; Caufield Schnug
- Website: sweepingpromises.com

Sweeping Promises is an American post-punk duo from Boston, Massachusetts, now based in Lawrence, Kansas, consisting of Lira Mondal and Caufield Schnug. Multi-instrumentalist Spenser Gralla has toured as their live drummer since 2019.

== History ==
The band's origin traces back to their meeting during their undergraduate years at Hendrix College in Conway, Arkansas, in 2008. Initially part of various musical endeavors, they found themselves writing exclusively together, solidifying a trust and respect that would define their collaboration over the next decade. In their early years, the duo navigated the Arkansas music scene, contributing to various projects. However, it was during a spontaneous jam session in an abandoned science lab-turned-art space in Boston that Sweeping Promises formed in late 2019. During the rise of the COVID-19 pandemic, the band relocated to Lawrence, Kansas, where they bought a house and attached studio.

Sweeping Promises garnered attention with their debut album, Hunger for a Way Out released in August 2020. The album showcased a distinctive post-punk sound characterized by raw energy, angular guitars, and melodic vocals. The critical acclaim for the album marked Sweeping Promises as a noteworthy addition to the post-punk music landscape. Notably, Gimmie Gimmie Gimmie Zine declared the album their favorite release of 2020, praising its simplicity, spirit, and thrilling qualities.

In June 2023, Sweeping Promises unveiled their second album, titled Good Living Is Coming For You. The recording process is notable for its departure from the single-mic technique employed in their debut. In an interview discussing the album, Caufield Schnug, one half of the duo, emphasized the significance of recording in diverse and imprecise spaces, rejecting the control-centric mindset often associated with modern recordings.

In May 2026, the band announced a North American tour for fall of 2026. Their album You Say I Romanticize was released on August 14, 2026.

== Discography ==
- Hunger for a Way Out (2020)
- Good Living Is Coming for You (2023)
- You Say I Romanticize (2026)
