= 2023 in American music =

The following is a list of events and releases that happened in 2023 in music in the United States.

== Notable events ==
=== January ===
- 6 – Iggy Pop released his first studio album in four years, Every Loser.
- 9 – Pentatonix performed the National Anthem at the College Football Playoff National Championship at SoFi Stadium in Inglewood, California.
- 13 – Jason Crabb released his first studio album in nearly five years, Miracle in a Manger.
  - Obituary released their first studio album in six years, Dying of Everything.
  - Miley Cyrus released "Flowers", her first single since 2021. The song has gone on to break multiple Spotify records, including the most-streamed song in one week. The record was previously held by Adele's "Easy on Me".
- 19 – Rock and Roll Hall of Fame inductee David Crosby dies at the age of 81.
- 20 – Easton Corbin released his first studio album in eight years, Let's Do Country Right.
- 24 – After 19 years, Brendon Urie announced that he was discontinuing Panic! at the Disco after the Viva Las Vengeance Tour finished, so he can focus on his family.
- 27 – The Arcs released their first album in eight years, Electrophonic Chronic.
  - Bass Drum of Death released their first studio album in five years, Say I Won't.
  - Meg Baird released her first studio album in eight years, Furling.
  - Tyler Hubbard of Florida Georgia Line released his self-titled debut solo studio album.
  - Elle King released her first studio album in nearly five years, Come Get Your Wife. It is her first true country music album.
  - King Tuff released his first studio album in five years, Smalltown Stardust.
- 31 – The Smashing Pumpkins released act two of their three-part rock opera album, Atum.

=== February ===
- 3 – All Out War released their first studio album in four years, Celestial Rot.
- 5 – The 65th Grammy Awards took place at the Crypto.com Arena in Los Angeles. Beyoncé and Maverick City Music took home the most awards with four each. Harry Styles won Album of the Year for Harry's House, Lizzo won Record of the Year for "About Damn Time", Bonnie Raitt won Song of the Year for "Just Like That" and Samara Joy won Best New Artist.
- 8 – Composer, songwriter, producer, and pianist Burt Bacharach dies at the age of 94.
- 10 – Paramore released their first studio album in nearly six years, This Is Why.
  - Quasi released their first studio album in ten years, Breaking the Balls of History.
  - Kelela released her first studio album in six years, Raven.
  - Pierce the Veil released their first studio album in seven years, The Jaws of Life. It is their first album without co-founder and drummer Mike Fuentes, who had left the band in 2017 following sexual misconduct allegations.
- 12 – Chris Stapleton performed National Anthem, Sheryl Lee Ralph performed Lift Every Voice and Sing, and Rihanna performed the halftime show during Super Bowl LVII at State Farm Stadium in Glendale, Arizona.
- 14 – Caroline Polachek released her first studio album in nearly four years, Desire, I Want to Turn Into You.
- 17 – Jordan Davis released his first studio album in five years, Bluebird Days.
  - P!nk released her first studio album in nearly four years, Trustfall.
  - Skrillex released his first solo studio album in nine years, Quest for Fire. It was followed by his next album, Don't Get Too Close, a day later.
  - Screaming Females released their first studio album in five years, and also their final album, Desire Pathway.
- 24 – Godsmack released their first studio album in five years, and also their final album, Lighting Up the Sky.
  - Steel Panther released their first studio album in four years, On the Prowl.
  - Dope released their first studio album in seven years, Blood Money, Part Zer0.
  - Dierks Bentley released his first studio album in five years, Gravel & Gold.
- 26 – Palisades disbanded after 15 years, following their final performance in Asbury Park, New Jersey.
- 27 – The Rise of the Machines Tour, featuring Fear Factory, Static-X and Dope, began at Roseland Theater in Portland, Oregon. The show marked Fear Factory's first live performance since 2016 and the band's first with current vocalist Milo Silvestro.

=== March ===
- 3 – Macklemore released his first studio album in nearly six years, BEN.
- 10 – 19 years after its formation as a band, Panic! at the Disco performed its final concert at AO Arena in Manchester, England.
  - Story of the Year released their first studio album in six years, Tear Me to Pieces.
  - Periphery released their first studio album in four years, Periphery V: Djent Is Not a Genre.
- 17 – Kamelot released their first studio album in five years, The Awakening.
  - Chelsea Grin released the second half of their double album, Suffer in Heaven.
- 24 – Fall Out Boy released their first studio album in five years, So Much (for) Stardust.
  - Meg Myers released her first studio album in five years, TZIA.
  - Owl City released his first album in five years, Coco Moon.
- 31 – Welshly Arms released their first album in five years, Wasted Words & Bad Decisions.
  - Andrew McMahon's solo project, Andrew McMahon in the Wilderness, released its first album in nearly five years, Tilt at the Wind No More.
  - Samiam released their first studio album in nearly 12 years, Stowaway.
  - Supergroup Boygenius released their debut album and first release in five years, The Record.
  - Melanie Martinez released her first album in nearly four years, Portals.

=== April ===
- 2 – The CMT Music Awards took place at the Moody Center in Austin, Texas. This was the first time the ceremony took place outside of Nashville.
- 7 – Mudhoney released their first studio album in five years, Plastic Eternity.
  - Rae Sremmurd released their first studio album in five years, Sremm 4 Life.
  - NF released his fifth studio album, HOPE. It was his first studio album in four years.
- 14 – Metallica released their first studio album in nearly seven years, 72 Seasons.
  - Overkill released their first studio album in four years, Scorched.
- 25 – Harry Belafonte dies at the age of 96.
- 28 – The National released their first studio album in four years, First Two Pages of Frankenstein. They followed it up with the surprise album Laugh Track less than five months later.
  - Smokey Robinson released Gasms, his first studio album in six years, his first non-Christmas album in nine years and his first album of all-new original material in 14 years.

=== May ===
- 4 – Blink-182 began their first tour with founding member Tom DeLonge since 2014.
  - The Smashing Pumpkins released the full three-act rock opera album Atum: A Rock Opera in Three Acts.
- 11 – The 58th Academy of Country Music Awards took place at Allegiant Stadium in Paradise, Nevada.
- 12 – Lauren Daigle released her first album in nearly five years, Lauren Daigle.
  - Cattle Decapitation released their first studio album in four years, Terrasite.
  - DevilDriver released the second half of their double-album cycle, Dealing with Demons Vol. II, three years after Vol. I's release.
  - Jonas Brothers released their first studio album in nearly four years, The Album.
- 19 – Dave Matthews Band released their first studio album in five years, Walk Around the Moon.
- 21 – Iam Tongi won the twenty-first season of American Idol. Megan Danielle was named runner-up.
- 23 – Gina Miles won the twenty-third season of The Voice. Grace West was named runner-up. Longtime coach Blake Shelton departs from the show after 23 seasons.
- 24 – The "Queen of Rock and Roll", Tina Turner, dies at her home in Switzerland at the age of 83.
  - Foo Fighters debuted their new drummer, Josh Freese, during their performance at the Bank of New Hampshire Pavilion in Gilford, New Hampshire.
- 26 – Matchbox Twenty released their first album in nearly 11 years, Where the Light Goes.
  - Metal Church released their first album in five years, Congregation of Annihilation. It is the band's first album with current vocalist Marc Lopes and their first since former vocalist Mike Howe's death in July 2021.

=== June ===
- 2 – Beach Fossils released their first studio album in six years, Bunny.
  - Ben Folds released his first studio album in eight years, What Matters Most.
  - Foo Fighters released But Here We Are, their first studio album following the 2022 death of drummer Taylor Hawkins; it is their first album since 1997's The Colour and the Shape to not feature Hawkins and their first since 2005's In Your Honor to feature guitarist/vocalist Dave Grohl on drums.
  - Avenged Sevenfold released their first studio album in nearly seven years, Life Is But a Dream....
  - Big Time Rush released their first studio album in ten years, Another Life.
  - Jake Shears released his first studio album in five years, Last Man Dancing.
  - Rival Sons released their first studio album in four years, Darkfighter. It was followed by a companion album, Lightbringer, released on October 20.
  - Rancid released their first studio album in six years, Tomorrow Never Comes.
  - The Revivalists released their first studio album in nearly five years, Pour It Out Into the Night.
- 8 – Alkaline Trio drummer Derek Grant announced his departure from the band after 22 years. Atom Willard later joined the band as his replacement.
- 9 – Janelle Monáe released her first studio album in five years, The Age of Pleasure.
  - The Dead Milkmen released their first studio album in nine years, Quaker City Quiet Pills.
  - Extreme released their first studio album in 15 years, Six.
  - Phillip Phillips released his first studio album in five years, Drift Back.
- 16 – Killer Mike released his first solo studio album in 11 years, Michael.
  - Queens of the Stone Age released their first studio album in nearly six years, In Times New Roman....
- 23 – Kelly Clarkson released her first studio album of all original material in nearly six years, Chemistry.
  - Portugal. The Man released their first studio album in six years, Chris Black Changed My Life.
  - Swans released their first studio album in four years, The Beggar.
  - Jake Owen released his first studio album in four years, Loose Cannon.
  - Albert Hammond Jr. released his first solo album in five years, Melodies on Hiatus.

=== July ===
- 7 – Taylor Swift released her third re-recorded album, Speak Now (Taylor's Version), a freshly recorded issue of her 2010 studio album, Speak Now.
  - Anohni and the Johnsons released their first studio album in 13 years, My Back Was a Bridge for You to Cross.
  - Julie Byrne released her first studio album in six years, The Greater Wings.
  - Local Natives released their first studio album in four years, Time Will Wait for No One. The album was followed by a companion album, But I'll Wait for You, released nine months later; the album would be the band's last with singer Kelcey Ayer, who announced his departure later in 2024.
- 14 – Palehound released their first studio album in four years, Eye on the Bat.
- 19 – Anti-Flag announced their abrupt disbandment after 31 years following a podcast episode leveling sexual assault accusations against vocalist Justin Sane.
- 21 – Tony Bennett dies at the age of 96.
- 26 – Eagles co-founder and bassist Randy Meisner dies at the age of 77.
- 28 – Travis Scott released his first studio album in nearly five years, Utopia.
  - Mutoid Man released their first studio album in six years, Mutants.

=== August ===
- 18 – Horrendous released their first album in five years, Ontological Mysterium.
- 22 – Dethklok released their first studio album in ten years, Dethalbum IV.
- 25 – Filter released their first studio album in seven years, The Algorithm.
  - Turnpike Troubadours released their first studio album in six years, A Cat in the Rain.

=== September ===
- 1 – Singer-songwriter Jimmy Buffett dies in his home in Sag Harbor, New York, due to complications from Merkel-cell carcinoma. He was 76.
- 2 – Aerosmith began their farewell tour, Peace Out: The Farewell Tour.
- 4 – Original Smash Mouth lead singer Steve Harwell dies from liver failure at the age of 56.
- 9 – Aerosmith perform at the UBS Arena in Elmont as part of their Peace Out farewell tour. Though unintended, this was eventually considered to be the band's final performance due to Steven Tyler fracturing his larynx.
- 12 – MTV Video Music Awards took place at the Prudential Center at Newark, New Jersey.
- 15 – Baroness released their first album in four years, Stone.
  - Sean Combs, under his stage name Diddy, released his first solo studio album in 17 years and his first overall studio album in 13 years, The Love Album: Off the Grid.
  - Explosions in the Sky released their first studio album in seven years, End.
  - Thirty Seconds to Mars released their first studio album in five years, It's the End of the World but It's a Beautiful Day.
  - Alan Palomo of Neon Indian released his first studio album in eight years, World of Hassle, which is also his first album released under his own name.
- 22 – Staind released their first studio album in 12 years, Confessions of the Fallen.
- 29 – Blonde Redhead released their first studio album in nine years, Sit Down for Dinner.
  - *NSYNC released their first new single in over 20 years, "Better Place", for the movie Trolls Band Together.
  - Taproot released their first studio album in eleven years, SC\SSRS.

=== October ===
- 6 – Dogstar released their first studio album in 23 years, Somewhere Between the Power Lines and Palm Trees.
  - Reba McEntire released her first studio album in four years, Not That Fancy.
  - Prong released their first studio album in six years, State of Emergency.
  - Glasser released her first studio album in ten years, Crux.
  - Darius Rucker released his first studio album in six years, Carolyn's Boy.
  - Colbie Caillat released her first solo studio album in seven years, Along the Way.
- 13 – Crosses released their first studio album in nine years, Goodnight, God Bless, I Love U, Delete.
- 20 – blink-182 released their first studio album in four years, One More Time.... It is their first album with founding member Tom DeLonge in twelve years.
  - Boys Like Girls released their first studio album in 11 years, Sunday at Foxwoods.
  - Cher released her first studio album in five years, Christmas. It is also her first Christmas album.
  - Guns N' Roses bassist Duff McKagan released his first solo studio album in four years, Lighthouse.
  - Chris Botti released his first album in 11 years, Vol. 1.
- 25 – Dream Theater reunited with founding drummer Mike Portnoy for the first time since his departure from the band in 2010.
- 27 – Taylor Swift released her fourth re-recorded album, 1989 (Taylor's Version), a freshly recorded issue of her fifth studio album 1989 (2014).
  - The Gaslight Anthem released their first studio album in nine years, History Books.
  - DJ Shadow released his first studio album in four years, Action Adventure.
  - Taking Back Sunday released their first studio album in seven years, 152. It is also their first album without guitarist and co-founder Eddie Reyes, who left the band in 2018.
  - Dokken released their first studio album in 11 years, Heaven Comes Down.

=== November ===
- 3 – Semisonic released their first studio album in 22 years, Little Bit of Sun.
  - Suffocation released their first studio album in six years, Hymns from the Apocrypha. It is the band's first album with current vocalist Ricky Myers.
- 8 – 57th Annual Country Music Association Awards took take place in at the Bridgestone Arena at Nashville, Tennessee.
- 10 – Brandy released her first studio album in three years, and her first-ever Christmas album, Christmas with Brandy.
  - Helmet released their first studio album in seven years, Left.
  - Beirut released their first studio album in four years, Hadsel.
  - Scream released their first studio album in 30 years, DC Special. The album features contributions from former drummer Dave Grohl, among others, and also features the final recordings of founding drummer Kent Stax, who died two months before the album's release.
- 17 – Dolly Parton released her first ever rock album, Rockstar. After being inducted into the Rock and Roll Hall of Fame in 2022, Parton said she would release a rock album.
  - Plain White T's released their first studio album in five years, Plain White T's.
- 19 – The Billboard Music Awards took place.
- 24 – My Morning Jacket released their first ever holiday album titled Happy Holiday.

=== December ===
- 1 – Jonathan Rado released his first album of new material in six years, For Who The Bell Tolls For.
  - The Philly Specials, consisting of Philadelphia Eagles players Lane Johnson, Jason Kelce, and Jordan Mailata, released their second charity Christmas album A Philly Special Christmas Special.
- 2 – Kiss concluded their End of the Road World Tour with their final performance at Madison Square Garden in New York City, after 50 years as a band.
- 5 – After 18 years, Screaming Females announce their breakup via their social media pages.
- 8 – Taylor Swift's ongoing Eras Tour became the highest-grossing concert tour of all time, surpassing Elton John's Farewell Yellow Brick Road tour, and the first to pass $1 billion in revenue.
  - Nicki Minaj released her first studio album in five years, Pink Friday 2.
  - Kenny G released his first album of new material in six years, Innocence.
- 19 – Huntley was crowned the winner of the twenty-fourth season of The Voice. Ruby Leigh declared the runner-up. Mara Justine, Jacquie Roar, and Lila Forde finished in third, fourth, and fifth place respectively.
- 22 – The Reverend Horton Heat released their first ever live album, Live In Houston.
- 29 – Head East released their first album in 10 years, Full Circle.

== Bands formed ==
- The Defiant
- PG14
- VCha

== Bands reformed ==
- Agalloch
- Balance and Composure
- Blessthefall
- Bloodhound Gang
- Chimaira
- The Color Morale
- Creed
- Crimson Glory
- Dogstar
- Dream Street
- The Exies
- Haste the Day
- Head Automatica
- The Last Goodnight
- Motograter
- NSYNC
- The Orwells
- Sublime

== Bands on hiatus ==
- Walk the Moon

== Bands disbanded ==
- Anti-Flag
- Injury Reserve
- Jars of Clay
- Kiss
- Kix
- The Last Goodnight
- MS MR
- Palisades
- Panic! at the Disco
- The Regrettes
- Screaming Females

== List of albums released ==
=== January ===
Date	Album	Artist	Genre(s)
1	Ambient 23	Moby	Ambient
6	Lies They Tell Our Children	Anti-Flag	Punk rock
6	Every Loser	Iggy Pop	Rock; punk rock
6	Black Butta	RuPaul	R&B; soul
6	No Rules Sandy (Reissue)	Sylvan Esso	Indie pop; electropop
6	I Rest My Case	YoungBoy Never Broke Again	Hip-hop
13	Free 03	03 Greedo	Hip-hop
13	Miracle in a Manger	Jason Crabb	Christian; southern gospel
13	Dying of Everything	Obituary	Death metal
13	Strays	Margo Price	Country; Americana
13	Hell Finds You Everywhere	Thousand Below	Post-hardcore; rock
13	Good Thing We Stayed	Julia Wolf	Indie pop; indie rock; pop rock
20	Attack on Memory (Reissue)	Cloud Nothings	Post-hardcore; noise rock; indie rock
20	Let's Do Country Right	Easton Corbin	Country
20	La La Land	Guided by Voices	Indie rock; alternative rock
20	The Mockingbird & the Crow	Hardy	Country; country rock
20	Like..? (EP)	Ice Spice	Hip-hop
20	Make the Most of It	New Found Glory	Acoustic
20	Mansion Musik	Trippie Redd	Trap; hardcore hip-hop; gangsta rap; rap rock
20	Lobes	We Are Scientists	Indie rock; alternative rock; post-punk revival
27	Electrophonic Chronic	The Arcs	Garage rock; soul; R&B; psychedelic rock
27	Furling	Meg Baird	Folk
27	Say I Won't	Bass Drum of Death	Garage rock; garage punk; noise rock; punk rock
27	Phoenix	Lakecia Benjamin	Jazz
27	Tyler Hubbard	Tyler Hubbard	Country
27	Come Get Your Wife	Elle King	Country
27	Smalltown Stardust	King Tuff	Alternative rock
27	Diamonds & Dancefloors	Ava Max	Pop
27	Miniature Tigers	Miniature Tigers	Indie pop
27	Honey	Samia	Indie rock; alternative rock; indie pop
27	Asking for a Ride	White Reaper	Garage rock; power pop

=== February ===
Date	Album	Artist	Genre(s)
3	Celestial Rot	All Out War	Metalcore; thrash metal
3	Ethos: Son of a Sharecropper	Terry Blade	Americana; country; blues; folk; gospel
3	The Cannonballers	Colony House	Indie rock
3	. I : & : I I .	John Frusciante	Alternative rock
3	New York City	The Men	Punk rock; post-punk
3	God Save the Teen	Mod Sun	Pop-punk; pop rock
3	Elocution Prattle	Say Hi	Indie rock
3	The Day My Father Died	SYML	Indie pop; pop
10	Best Night of My Life	American Authors	Indie rock; pop rock
10	Raven	Kelela	Alternative R&B; electronica
10	This Is Why	Paramore	Alternative rock; dance-punk; indie pop
10	The Jaws of Life	Pierce the Veil	Post-hardcore; alternative rock
10	Breaking the Balls of History	Quasi	Indie rock; indie pop; electronic pop
10	I Hate Cowboys & All Dogs Go to Hell	Chase Rice	Country
10	Pollen	Tennis	Indie pop
10	This Stupid World	Yo La Tengo	Alternative rock; indie rock
14	Desire, I Want to Turn Into You	Caroline Polachek	Indie pop
17	Bluebird Days	Jordan Davis	Country pop
17	All Fiction	Pile	Indie rock; post-punk
17	Trustfall	P!nk	Pop; dance-pop
17	Desire Pathway	Screaming Females	Punk rock; indie rock
17	The Moth, the Lizard, and the Secret Machines	Secret Machines	Alternative rock; space rock
17	Quest for Fire	Skrillex	Electronic; house
17	Weight of the World	Joe Louis Walker	Electric blues
18	Don't Get Too Close	Skrillex	Electronic; pop
24	Good Riddance	Gracie Abrams	Pop; bedroom pop
24	Shook	Algiers	Post-punk
24	Gravel & Gold	Dierks Bentley	Country
24	Blood Money, Part Zer0	Dope	Nu metal
24	Lighting Up the Sky	Godsmack	Hard rock
24	High Drama	Adam Lambert	Pop
24	Should've Learned by Now	Lucero	Heartland rock; blues rock
24	On the Prowl	Steel Panther	Glam metal; comedy rock

=== March ===
Date	Album	Artist	Genre(s)
3	Pineapple Sunrise	Beach Weather	Alternative rock; pop rock
3	Thanks But No Thanks	Can't Swim	Rock
3	Foreground Music	Ron Gallo	Alternative rock; indie rock
3	BEN	Macklemore	Hip-hop
3	SuperGlue	Ella Vos	Indie rock; indie pop
3	One Thing at a Time	Morgan Wallen	Country pop
10	Voices	The Cold Stares	Hard rock; blues rock
10	Endless Summer Vacation	Miley Cyrus	Synth-pop; rock; psychedelia; country; nu-disco; electro-funk
10	Periphery V: Djent Is Not a Genre	Periphery	Progressive metal; djent; progressive metalcore
10	Tear Me to Pieces	Story of the Year	Pop-punk; emo; post-hardcore; metalcore; nu metal
10	Remember... You Must Die	Suicide Silence	Deathcore
15	With Love From	Aly & AJ	Americana; folk; indie pop
17	10,000 Gecs	100 gecs	Rock; electronic rock
17	Tell Me I'm Alive	All Time Low	Alternative rock; pop rock; pop-punk
17	Suffer in Heaven	Chelsea Grin	Deathcore
17	More Power. More Pain.	Gideon	Hardcore punk; metalcore
17	The Awakening	Kamelot	Power metal; progressive metal; symphonic metal
17	Thrones of Blood	Sullivan King	Dance
17	Keed Talk to 'Em 2 (EP)	Lil Keed	Hip-hop
17	Lil Pump 2	Lil Pump	Hip-hop
17	Ride Away	Moon Boots	House
17	Skeletons	Pop Evil	Rock
17	On Top of the Covers	T-Pain	R&B; hip-hop
24	93696	Liturgy	Black metal; avant-garde metal
24	The Art of Forgetting	Caroline Rose	Indie folk
24	Ashtrays and Apathy	Crash Romeo	Punk rock
24	Coco Moon	Owl City	Synth-pop; electronica
24	Death Below	August Burns Red	Metalcore; Christian metal
24	Did You Know That There's a Tunnel Under Ocean Blvd	Lana Del Rey	Folk rock; trap; pop
24	Gettin' Old	Luke Combs	Country
24	Omni, Pt. 1	Project 86	Metalcore; nu metal
24	So Much (for) Stardust	Fall Out Boy	Rock; pop rock; pop-punk
24	Since I Have a Lover	6lack	R&B
24	Ten Stories High	The Bouncing Souls	Punk rock
24	TZIA	Meg Myers	Alternative rock; art rock; indie rock
31	Tilt at the Wind No More	Andrew McMahon in the Wilderness	Alternative rock; indie pop
31	The Record	Boygenius	Indie pop; indie rock
31	In Pieces	Chlöe	R&B; pop; trap
31	Portals	Melanie Martinez	Alternative pop; art pop
31	Void Eternal	Nothing,Nowhere	Indie rock; post-hardcore
31	Stowaway	Samiam	Punk rock; pop-punk
31	Body	Transviolet	Pop rock; indie pop
31	Wasted Words & Bad Decisions	Welshly Arms	Blues rock; indie rock; pop rock

=== April ===
Date	Album	Artist	Genre(s)
7	The Book of Broken Glass	Sarah and the Safe Word	Alternative rock
7	Music Man	Layng Martine Jr.	Pop; country
7	Plastic Eternity	Mudhoney	Alternative rock
7	Sremm 4 Life	Rae Sremmurd	Hip-hop
7	The Valley of Vision	Manchester Orchestra	Indie rock; art rock; alternative rock
14	72 Seasons	Metallica	Heavy metal; hard rock
14	Forever Means (EP)	Angel Olsen	Indie folk; alternative country
14	Glorious Game	El Michels Affair and Black Thought	Hip-hop
14	High & Low	Caitlyn Smith	Country
14	Intellectual Property	Waterparks	Pop rock; alternative rock
14	Scorched	Overkill	Thrash metal
21	The Course of the Inevitable III: Pieces of My Pain	Lloyd Banks	Hip-hop
21	Don't Try This at Home	YoungBoy Never Broke Again	Hip-hop
21	Guilty	Loren Gray	Pop
21	Que Dios Te Maldiga Mi Corazón	The Mars Volta	Acoustic
21	Safe To Run	Esther Rose	Country
28	Damn Love	Kip Moore	Country
28	Drive Like It's Stolen	Dave Hause	Punk rock; alternative rock
28	First Two Pages of Frankenstein	The National	Indie rock; art rock
28	Gasms	Smokey Robinson	Soul
28	Nate Smith	Nate Smith	Country

=== May ===
Date	Album	Artist	Genre(s)
5	So Many Other Realities Exist Simultaneously	Atmosphere	Hip-hop
5	Funeral	DC the Don	Hip-hop
5	Everything Harmony	The Lemon Twigs	Rock
5	Stray Dog	Justin Moore	Country
5	Lucky	Megan Moroney	Country
5	Atum: A Rock Opera in Three Acts	The Smashing Pumpkins	Alternative rock; rock
12	Terrasite	Cattle Decapitation	Deathgrind; technical death metal
12	Lauren Daigle	Lauren Daigle	Christian; pop
12	Dealing with Demons Vol. II	DevilDriver	Groove metal; melodic death metal
12	Okemah Rising	Dropkick Murphys	Celtic punk; acoustic
12	(Whirring Marvels In) Consensus Reality	Eluvium	Ambient; electronic
12	Why Would I Watch	Hot Mulligan	Pop-punk; emo
12	The Album	Jonas Brothers	Pop
12	Self Titled	Little Image	Alternative rock; pop rock
12	Shadowkasters	The Rocket Summer	Indie rock; pop rock
19	Walk Around the Moon	Dave Matthews Band	Rock
19	Gag Order	Kesha	Art pop; experimental pop; psychedelic pop
19	I Am the Dog	Sir Chloe	Indie rock
19	Toxic Positivity	The Used	Alternative rock; post-hardcore
19	Clear 2: Soft Life (EP)	Summer Walker	R&B; soul
26	Disposable Everything	AJJ	Punk rock
26	Roach	Miya Folick	Indie rock; indie pop; folk rock
26	Freak of Nature	Heart Attack Man	Punk rock; pop-punk; emo
26	Pistolz & Pearlz	Kodak Black	Hip-hop
26	Where the Light Goes	Matchbox Twenty	Alternative rock
26	Congregation of Annihilation	Metal Church	Heavy metal; thrash metal

=== June ===
Date	Album	Artist	Genre (s)
2	I've Loved You for So Long	The Aces	Indie pop
2	Life Is But a Dream...	Avenged Sevenfold	Heavy metal; avant-garde metal
2	Bunny	Beach Fossils	Indie rock
2	Another Life	Big Time Rush	Pop; R&B
2	Vol. 10	Buckcherry	Rock
2	Lucky for You	Bully	Punk rock; garage rock; indie rock
2	What Matters Most	Ben Folds	Alternative rock
2	But Here We Are	Foo Fighters	Rock; alternative rock
2	Wide Open Light	Ben Harper	Folk
2	Whitsitt Chapel	Jelly Roll	Country
2	If We're Being Honest	lovelytheband	Indie pop; pop rock
2	Tomorrow Never Comes	Rancid	Punk rock
2	Pour It Out Into the Night	The Revivalists	Alternative rock
2	Darkfighter	Rival Sons	Hard rock; blues rock
2	Last Man Dancing	Jake Shears	Disco-pop; acid house
2	Sweet Western Sound	Tanya Tucker	Country
9	Quaker City Quiet Pills	The Dead Milkmen	Punk rock; alternative rock
9	Six	Extreme	Hard rock
9	Girl with Fish	Feeble Little Horse	Indie rock; noise rock; garage rock
9	The Age of Pleasure	Janelle Monáe	Afrobeat; reggae; soul
9	Drift Back	Phillip Phillips	Pop
16	The Whaler	Home Is Where	Emo
16	Michael	Killer Mike	Hip-hop
16	Grudges	Kiana Ledé	Pop; R&B
16	I Want More	Donny McCaslin	Pop; jazz
16	In Times New Roman...	Queens of the Stone Age	Alternative rock; hard rock; desert rock
16	Rebuilding The Mountain	Royal Thunder	Hard rock; stoner rock
23	Central City	Big Freedia	Hip-hop
23	Chemistry	Kelly Clarkson	Pop; pop rock; dance-pop
23	Melodies on Hiatus	Albert Hammond Jr.	Rock; indie rock
23	Mystical Magical Rhythmical Radical Ride	Jason Mraz	Folk-pop; pop rock
23	Loose Cannon	Jake Owen	Country
23	Chris Black Changed My Life	Portugal. The Man	Alternative rock; psychedelic pop
23	The Beggar	Swans	Experimental rock; post-rock; noise rock
30	Flying High	The Alchemist	Hip-hop
30	Convinced (EP)	Anberlin	Alternative rock
30	Grand Salami Time!	The Baseball Project	Rock
30	Blowout	John Carroll Kirby	Dance
30	Fine Tune	Terrace Martin	Hip-hop; pop
30	I've Got Me	Joanna Sternberg	Folk

=== July ===
Date	Album	Artist	Genre (s)
7	My Back Was a Bridge for You to Cross	Anohni and the Johnsons	Art pop; avant-pop
7	The Greater Wings	Julie Byrne	Indie folk
7	Sunburn	Dominic Fike	Alternative hip-hop; indie pop
7	I Want It All Right Now	Grouplove	Alternative rock; indie pop
7	Time Will Wait for No One	Local Natives	Indie rock
7	Freakazoid	The Pink Spiders	Punk rock; pop-punk
7	Speak Now (Taylor's Version)	Taylor Swift	Country pop; pop
7	Childhood Eyes (EP)	Yellowcard	Pop-punk
14	Supermodels	Claud	Bedroom pop
14	People Just Wanna Have Fun	Kool & the Gang	R&B; soul
14	Nosebleeds	MisterWives	Pop rock; indie pop
14	Eye on the Bat	Palehound	Indie rock; alternative rock
14	Evergreen	Pvris	Alternative rock; pop rock; indie rock
21	Starcatcher	Greta Van Fleet	Blues rock; rock; progressive rock
21	Welshpool Frillies	Guided by Voices	Rock
21	Jump Into Love	Half Japanese	Alternative rock; indie rock
21	Mid Air	Paris Texas	Hip-hop; rap rock
21	Barbie the Album	Various artists	Soundtrack; pop; dance-pop
28	In The Moment You Were Born	Brad	Alternative rock; grunge
28	Natural Disaster	Bethany Cosentino	Pop rock; folk rock
28	Blackout	From Ashes to New	Rap rock; rap metal; alternative rock
28	Austin	Post Malone	Pop; hip-hop; alternative rock
28	Mutants	Mutoid Man	Hard rock; psychedelic rock; speed metal
28	Utopia	Travis Scott	Hip-hop; trap; psychedelic
28	Truth Killer	Sevendust	Hard rock; alternative metal

=== August ===
Date	Album	Artist	Genre (s)
1	The Maine	The Maine	Pop-punk; pop rock; emo
4	Doom Singer	Chris Farren	Indie rock; indie pop; pop-punk
4	You Are Who You Hang Out With	The Front Bottoms	Indie rock; indie pop
4	Mammoth II	Mammoth WVH	Hard rock; rock
4	Still Love	Teenage Wrist	Alternative rock; indie pop
4	I Showed U So	Yo Gotti and DJ Drama	Hip-hop
11	The Dark	The Band Camino	Indie rock; pop rock
11	Keeping Secrets Will Destroy You	Bonnie "Prince" Billy	Rock; indie rock
11	The Dreamer – Joseph: Part One	Neal Morse	Progressive rock; Christian rock
11	Sundial	Noname	Hip-hop
11	Take Back The Night	Starbenders	Glam rock; rock
18	Death Is Nothing To Us	Fiddlehead	Post-hardcore; indie rock
18	Ontological Mysterium	Horrendous	Death metal; progressive metal
18	Ruckus!	Movements	Post-hardcore; emo
18	Mother Road	Grace Potter	Rock; pop
18	Rocket Power	Quavo	Hip-hop
18	Snow Angel	Reneé Rapp	Pop
22	Dethalbum IV	Dethklok	Melodic death metal
25	Zach Bryan	Zach Bryan	Country; country rock
25	The Long Goodbye	Candlebox	Alternative rock; rock
25	Road	Alice Cooper	Hard rock; heavy metal
25	The Algorithm	Filter	Alternative rock; industrial rock
25	Standing Room Only	Tim McGraw	Country
25	Find a Way Home	MxPx	Pop-punk
25	wear your heart out	Nightly	Pop rock
25	A Cat in the Rain	Turnpike Troubadours	Red dirt; country
31	Hellmode	Jeff Rosenstock	Alternative rock; indie rock

=== September ===
Date	Album	Artist	Genre (s)
1	Out of the Shadows	Escape the Fate	Hard rock; post-hardcore
1	Earned It	Larry Fleet	Country
1	No Traffic	Illa J	Hip-hop
1	E3	Midwxst	Hip-hop
1	Rabbit Rabbit	Speedy Ortiz	Indie rock; alternative rock
1	I'm So Lucky	Spirit of the Beehive	Indie rock; alternative rock
8	Brand New Soul	American Dust	Pop rock; pop-punk; hardcore punk
8	Any Joy	As Friends Rust	Melodic hardcore
8	Live at the Whisky A Go Go	Everclear	Alternative rock; rock
8	Clear Pond Road	Kristin Hersh	Folk-pop; alternative rock
8	The Devil I Know	Ashley McBryde	Country
8	Nobody Owns You	Joan Osborne	Folk
8	Ubiquitous	Puddle of Mudd	Post-grunge; hard rock
8	Guts	Olivia Rodrigo	Pop
15	Shellshock	Ballyhoo!	Punk rock; reggae rock
15	Stone	Baroness	Rock; hard rock; heavy metal
15	Silence Between Songs	Madison Beer	Pop; dream pop
15	The Love Album: Off the Grid	Diddy	R&B; hip-hop
15	End	Explosions in the Sky	Post-rock; instrumental rock
15	The End	Cody Fry	Rock
15	MONO	K.Flay	Indie rock; indie pop; pop-punk
15	Revamped	Demi Lovato	Rock
15	Caves	Needtobreathe	Christian rock; rock
15	World of Hassle	Alan Palomo	Electronic; chillwave; indie pop
15	I've Tried Everything but Therapy (Part 1)	Teddy Swims	Pop; R&B
15	CMF2	Corey Taylor	Hard rock; heavy metal
15	It's the End of the World but It's a Beautiful Day	Thirty Seconds to Mars	Rock; alternative rock
18	Laugh Track	The National	Indie rock
22	EndEx	3Teeth	Hard rock; industrial metal
22	Southern Star	Brent Cobb	Country; pop
22	Scarlet	Doja Cat	Hip-hop
22	Atlas	Laurel Halo	Electronic; avant-pop
22	The Rise and Fall of a Midwest Princess	Chappell Roan	Pop; dance-pop
22	Confessions of the Fallen	Staind	Alternative metal; post-grunge; nu metal
26	Not Dead Yet (EP)	Just Surrender	Pop-punk
29	Screamin' at the Sky	Black Stone Cherry	Hard rock; heavy metal
29	Sit Down for Dinner	Blonde Redhead	Alternative rock; indie rock
29	Spinning the Truth Around (Part II)	Blue October	Alternative rock; rock
29	Would You Miss It?	Koyo	Emo; pop-punk; melodic hardcore
29	SC\SSRS	Taproot	Nu metal; alternative metal
29	Alone in a Crowd	Oliver Tree	Indie rock; alternative rock
29	Cousin	Wilco	Indie rock; alternative rock

=== October ===
Date	Album	Artist	Genre (s)
6	Blues Deluxe Vol. 2	Joe Bonamassa	Blues rock; hard rock
6	Along the Way	Colbie Caillat	Country
6	Somewhere Between the Power Lines and Palm Trees	Dogstar	Alternative rock
6	Crux	Glasser	Electropop; indietronica
6	Not That Fancy	Reba McEntire	Country
6	Tether	Of Mice & Men	Metalcore
6	Memory Lane	Old Dominion	Country
6	State of Emergency	Prong	Groove metal; alternative metal; thrash metal
6	Carolyn's Boy	Darius Rucker	Country
6	Javelin	Sufjan Stevens	Indie folk; indie pop
13	The Surface	Beartooth	Alternative metal; metalcore; post-hardcore
13	The Last Night of Sadness	Jenn Champion	Alternative rock; indie rock
13	Goodnight, God Bless, I Love U, Delete.	Crosses	Dark wave; electronic rock; dream pop
13	A Classic Christmas	Gavin DeGraw	Christmas; pop
13	Jonny	The Drums	Indie rock; indie pop
13	Some of It Was True	The Menzingers	Punk rock
17	Breath of Fresh Air	Gucci Mane	Hip-hop
20	One More Time...	Blink-182	Pop-punk; rock; alternative rock
20	Coat of Many Colors	Brandon Lake	Contemporary worship; CCM; Christian rock; Christian R&B; Christian country
20	Vol. 1	Chris Botti	Jazz
20	Sunday at Foxwoods	Boys Like Girls	Pop rock; pop-punk
20	Christmas	Cher	Christmas; pop
20	Free Radicals	Dog Eat Dog	Rock; heavy metal
20	Christmas Songs	David Foster and Katharine McPhee	Christmas
20	Lighthouse	Duff McKagan	Hard rock; punk rock
20	Lightbringer	Rival Sons	Rock; blues rock
20	Cherish	Vacationer	Dream pop; electropop
27	If We're Really Being Honest	The Defiant	Punk rock; pop-punk; rock
27	Action Adventure	DJ Shadow	Instrumental hip-hop; electronica
27	Heaven Comes Down	Dokken	Heavy metal; hard rock
27	Black Bayou	Robert Finley	Blues; soul
27	History Books	The Gaslight Anthem	Heartland rock; alternative rock; punk rock
27	Merry Christmas from Jon Pardi	Jon Pardi	Christmas; country
27	Zig	Poppy	Dark pop
27	1989 (Taylor's Version)	Taylor Swift	Pop; synth-pop
27	152	Taking Back Sunday	Alternative rock; emo; heartland rock

=== November ===
Date	Album	Artist	Genre (s)
3	Highway Desperado	Jason Aldean	Country
3	Equal Strain on All Parts	Jimmy Buffett	Country rock; Gulf and Western
3	Cold War Kids	Cold War Kids	Indie rock; indie pop; alternative rock
3	Dolenz Sings R.E.M.	Micky Dolenz	Rock; pop
3	In December	Robert Glasper	Christmas
3	Leather	Cody Johnson	Country
3	Little Bit of Sun	Semisonic	Alternative rock; pop rock
3	Hymns from the Apocrypha	Suffocation	Technical death metal
10	The Maybe Man	AJR	Indie pop; pop rock
10	Hadsel	Beirut	Indie pop; Balkan folk
10	Christmas with Brandy	Brandy	R&B; Christmas; pop
10	Hotel Bleu	Broadside	Pop-punk; emo
10	11:11	Chris Brown	R&B; Afrobeats; pop
10	Heartbeat Highway	Cannons	Indie pop; dream pop
10	Left	Helmet	Alternative metal
10	Live in Brooklyn	Matisyahu	Reggae; hip-hop
10	Too Good to Be True	Rick Ross and Meek Mill	Hip-hop
10	DC Special	Scream	Post-hardcore; hardcore punk
10	Higher	Chris Stapleton	Country
17	Welcome 2 Collegrove	2 Chainz and Lil Wayne	Hip-hop
17	New Blue Sun	André 3000	Avant-garde; free jazz
17	Fruitcake (EP)	Sabrina Carpenter	Christmas; pop
17	Hearth Room	Frost Children	Hyperpop
17	Juliana Hatfield Sings ELO	Juliana Hatfield	Alternative rock
17	100% Songwriter	Toby Keith	Country
17	Rockstar	Dolly Parton	Rock
17	Plain White T's	Plain White T's	Pop-punk; alternative rock
17	Dirt on My Diamonds Vol. 1	Kenny Wayne Shepherd	Blues rock; hard rock; rock
17	The Hunger Games: The Ballad of Songbirds & Snakes	Various artists	Alternative pop; indie pop; country; folk
24	Czartificial Intelligence	Czarface	Hip-hop
24	Nowhere to Go but Up	Guided by Voices	Indie rock; alternative rock
24	What Christmas Means to Me	Adam Hawley	Jazz; pop
24	The Box Vol. 1: Resurrection	Lillian Axe	Hard rock; heavy metal
24	Happy Holiday	My Morning Jacket	Christmas; indie rock; alternative rock

=== December ===
Date	Album	Artist	Genre (s)
1	Alchemical Vol. 1	Dove Cameron	Pop; dance
1	Night in The City	Robben Ford	Rock; pop
1	Gabby Sword	Gabby's World	Alternative rock; indie rock
1	If Only You Were Lonely XV	Hawthorne Heights	Emo; post-hardcore
1	Nosebleeder	Lil Lotus	Post-hardcore; pop-punk; alternative hip-hop
1	For Who The Bell Tolls For	Jonathan Rado	Indie rock; rock
8	The Beautiful Dark of Life	Atreyu	Metalcore; alternative metal
8	Simpler Things	The Band of Heathens	Country rock; folk rock
8	50th Anniversary Live First Night	Blue Öyster Cult	Hard rock; heavy metal
8	Innocence	Kenny G	Jazz; pop
8	Rebel Diamonds	The Killers	Alternative rock; rock
8	Pink Friday 2	Nicki Minaj	Hip-hop
15	Owl Song	Ambrose Akinmusire	Jazz
15	EELS So Good Essential EELS Vol. 2	Eels	Alternative rock; indie rock
15	City Talk	HalfNoise	Alternative rock; indie pop
15	Long Story Short Willie Nelson 90	Various artists	Country; pop
22	Palermo	Conway the Machine	Hip-hop
22	Montgomeryland (65th anniversary release)	Wes Montgomery	Jazz
22	The Complete Nazz	The Nazz	Garage rock; power pop
22	Acres of Diamonds	Pep Love	Hip-hop
22	Live in Houston	The Reverend Horton Heat	Psychobilly; rockabilly
29	Die for the Government (Reissue)	Anti-Flag	Punk rock
29	Next Voyage	The Blues Image	Rock; blues rock
29	Full Circle	Head East	Rock
29	Bewitched	Eddie Higgins	Jazz; pop

== Top songs on record ==
=== Billboard Hot 100 No. 1 Songs ===
- "All I Want for Christmas Is You" – Mariah Carey (2 weeks in 2019, 2 weeks in 2020, 2 weeks in 2021, 5 weeks in 2022, 3 weeks in 2023)
- "Anti-Hero" – Taylor Swift (6 weeks in 2022, 2 weeks in 2023)
- "Cruel Summer" – Taylor Swift (4 weeks)
- "Die for You" – The Weeknd and Ariana Grande (1 week)
- "First Person Shooter" – Drake feat. J. Cole (1 week)
- "Flowers" – Miley Cyrus (8 weeks)
- "I Remember Everything" – Zach Bryan feat. Kacey Musgraves (1 week)
- "Is It Over Now?" – Taylor Swift (1 week)
- "Kill Bill" – SZA (1 week)
- "Last Night" – Morgan Wallen (16 weeks)
- "Like Crazy" – Jimin (1 week)
- "Lovin on Me" – Jack Harlow (1 week)
- "Paint the Town Red" – Doja Cat (3 weeks)
- "Rich Men North of Richmond" – Oliver Anthony (2 weeks)
- "Rockin' Around the Christmas Tree" – Brenda Lee (2 weeks)
- "Seven" – Jungkook feat. Latto (1 week)
- "Slime You Out" – Drake feat. SZA (1 week)
- "Try That in a Small Town" – Jason Aldean (1 week)
- "Vampire" – Olivia Rodrigo (2 weeks)

=== Billboard Hot 100 Top 20 Hits ===
All songs that reached the Top 20 on the Billboard Hot 100 chart during the year, complete with peak chart placement.

- "3D" – Jungkook feat. Jack Harlow (#5)
- "7969 Santa" – Drake (#16)
- "8AM in Charlotte" – Drake (#17)
- "A Holly Jolly Christmas" – Burl Ives (#4 in 2020, #5 in 2023)
- "Agora Hills" – Doja Cat (#14)
- "Ain't That Some" – Morgan Wallen (#11)
- "All-American Bitch" – Olivia Rodrigo (#13)
- "All I Want for Christmas Is You" – Mariah Carey (#1)
- "All My Life" – Lil Durk feat. J. Cole (#2)
- "All of the Girls You Loved Before" – Taylor Swift (#12)
- "All You Had to Do Was Stay (Taylor's Version)" – Taylor Swift (#20)
- "Amen" – Drake feat. Teezo Touchdown (#15)
- "Anti-Hero" – Taylor Swift (#1)
- "As It Was" – Harry Styles (#1 in 2022, #7 in 2023)
- "Back to December (Taylor's Version)" – Taylor Swift (#16)
- "Bad Blood (Taylor's Version)" – Taylor Swift (#7)
- "Bad Habit" – Steve Lacy (#1 in 2022, #9 in 2023)
- "Bad Idea Right?" – Olivia Rodrigo (#7)
- "Bahamas Promises" – Drake (#20)
- "Barbie World" – Nicki Minaj, Ice Spice and Aqua (#7)
- "Blank Space (Taylor's Version)" – Taylor Swift (#12)
- "Bongos" – Cardi B and Megan Thee Stallion (#14)
- "Boy's a Liar Pt. 2" – PinkPantheress and Ice Spice (#3)
- "Bzrp Music Sessions, Vol. 53" – Bizarrap and Shakira (#9)
- "Call Your Friends" – Rod Wave (#18)
- "Calling for You" – Drake feat. 21 Savage (#5)
- "Calm Down" – Rema and Selena Gomez (#3)
- "Chemical" – Post Malone (#13)
- "Christmas (Baby Please Come Home)" – Darlene Love (#15)
- "Come See Me" – Rod Wave (#19)
- "Creepin'" – Metro Boomin, The Weeknd and 21 Savage (#3)
- "Cruel Summer" – Taylor Swift (#1)
- "Cuff It" – Beyoncé (#6)
- "Cupid" – Fifty Fifty (#17)
- "Dance the Night" – Dua Lipa (#6)
- "Daylight" – Drake (#8)
- "Deck the Halls" – Nat King Cole (#16 in 2022, #17 in 2023)
- "Die for You" – The Weeknd and Ariana Grande (#1)
- "Double Fantasy" – The Weeknd feat. Future (#18)
- "East Side of Sorrow" – Zach Bryan (#18)
- "Ella Baila Sola" – Eslabon Armado and Peso Pluma (#4)
- "Enchanted (Taylor's Version)" – Taylor Swift (#19)
- "Endless Fashion" – Lil Uzi Vert feat. Nicki Minaj (#20)
- "Everything I Love" – Morgan Wallen (#14)
- "Eyes Closed" – Ed Sheeran (#19)
- "Fast Car" – Luke Combs (#2)
- "Favorite Song" – Toosii (#5)
- "Fear of Heights" – Drake (#10)
- "Fe!n" – Travis Scott feat. Playboi Carti (#5)
- "Feliz Navidad" – José Feliciano (#6 in 2021, #7 in 2023)
- "Fight the Feeling" – Rod Wave (#16)
- "Fina" – Bad Bunny and Young Miko (#14)
- "First Person Shooter" – Drake feat. J. Cole (#1)
- "Flooded the Face" – Lil Uzi Vert (#11)
- "Flowers" – Miley Cyrus (#1)
- "FukUMean" – Gunna (#4)
- "Gently" – Drake feat. Bad Bunny (#12)
- "Get Him Back!" – Olivia Rodrigo (#11)
- "Golden Hour" – Jvke (#10)
- "Greedy" – Tate McRae (#7)
- "Hey Driver" – Zach Bryan feat. The War and Treaty (#14)
- "Houdini" – Dua Lipa (#11)
- "Hyaena" – Travis Scott (#14)
- "I Can See You" – Taylor Swift (#5)
- "I Know ?" – Travis Scott (#11)
- "I Like You (A Happier Song)" – Post Malone feat. Doja Cat (#3 in 2022, #19 in 2023)
- "I Remember Everything" – Zach Bryan feat. Kacey Musgraves (#1)
- "I Wrote the Book" – Morgan Wallen (#18)
- "I'm Good (Blue)" – David Guetta and Bebe Rexha (#4)
- "IDGAF" – Drake feat. Yeat (#2)
- "Is It Over Now?" – Taylor Swift (#1)
- "It's Beginning to Look a Lot Like Christmas" – Michael Bublé (#19)
- "It's Beginning to Look a Lot Like Christmas" – Perry Como and The Fontane Sisters with Mitchell Ayres and His Orchestra (#12 in 2020, #14 in 2023)
- "It's the Most Wonderful Time of the Year" – Andy Williams (#5 in 2021, #6 in 2023)
- "Jingle Bell Rock" – Bobby Helms (#3)
- "Jingle Bells" – Frank Sinatra (#16)
- "Just Wanna Rock" – Lil Uzi Vert (#10)
- "K-pop" – Travis Scott, Bad Bunny and The Weeknd (#7)
- "Karma" – Taylor Swift feat. Ice Spice (#2)
- "Kill Bill" – SZA (#1)
- "La Bebé" – Yng Lvcas and Peso Pluma (#11)
- "Last Christmas" – Wham! (#4)
- "Last Night" – Morgan Wallen (#1)
- "Lavender Haze" – Taylor Swift (#2 in 2022, #11 in 2023)
- "Let It Snow, Let It Snow, Let It Snow" – Dean Martin (#8)
- "Like Crazy" – Jimin (#1)
- "Logical" – Olivia Rodrigo (#20)
- "Love You Anyway" – Luke Combs (#15)
- "Lovin on Me" – Jack Harlow (#1)
- "Made You Look" – Meghan Trainor (#11)
- "Making the Bed" – Olivia Rodrigo (#19)
- "Man Made a Bar" – Morgan Wallen feat. Eric Church (#15)
- "Meltdown" – Travis Scott feat. Drake (#3)
- "Mine (Taylor's Version)" – Taylor Swift (#15)
- "Monaco" – Bad Bunny (#5)
- "My Eyes" – Travis Scott (#19)
- "Need a Favor" – Jelly Roll (#13)
- "Now and Then" – The Beatles (#7)
- "Now That We Don't Talk" – Taylor Swift (#2)
- "Oh U Went" – Young Thug feat. Drake (#19)
- "One Thing at a Time" – Morgan Wallen (#10)
- "Out of the Woods (Taylor's Version)" – Taylor Swift (#16)
- "Paint the Town Red" – Doja Cat (#1)
- "Perro Negro" – Bad Bunny and Feid (#20)
- "Players" – Coi Leray (#9)
- "Princess Diana" – Ice Spice and Nicki Minaj (#4)
- "Put It on da Floor Again" – Latto feat. Cardi B (#13)
- "Red Ruby da Sleeze" – Nicki Minaj (#13)
- "Religiously" – Bailey Zimmerman (#13)
- "Rich Baby Daddy" – Drake feat. Sexyy Red and SZA (#11)
- "Rich Flex" – Drake and 21 Savage (#2 in 2022, #5 in 2023)
- "Rich Men North of Richmond" – Oliver Anthony (#1)
- "Rock and a Hard Place" – Bailey Zimmerman (#10)
- "Rockin' Around the Christmas Tree" – Brenda Lee (#1)
- "Santa Tell Me" – Ariana Grande (#12)
- "Sarah's Place" – Zach Bryan feat. Noah Kahan (#14)
- "Save Me" – Jelly Roll and Lainey Wilson (#19)
- "Say Don't Go" – Taylor Swift (#5)
- "Search & Rescue" – Drake (#2)
- "Seven" – Jungkook feat. Latto (#1)
- "Single Soon" – Selena Gomez (#19)
- "Sleigh Ride" – The Ronettes (#8)
- "Slime You Out" – Drake feat. SZA (#1)
- "Slut!" – Taylor Swift (#3)
- "Snooze" – SZA (#2)
- "Something in the Orange" – Zach Bryan (#10)
- "Spotless" – Zach Bryan feat. The Lumineers (#17)
- "Standing Next to You" – Jungkook (#5)
- "Style (Taylor's Version)" – Taylor Swift (#9)
- "Suburban Legends" – Taylor Swift (#10)
- "Super Freaky Girl" – Nicki Minaj (#1 in 2022, #18 in 2023)
- "Superhero (Heroes & Villains)" – Metro Boomin, Future and Chris Brown (#8 in 2022, #18 in 2023)
- "Sure Thing" – Miguel (#11)
- "Thank God" – Kane Brown and Katelyn Brown (#13)
- "Thank God" – Travis Scott (#16)
- "The Christmas Song (Merry Christmas to You)" – Nat King Cole (#9)
- "The Grudge" – Olivia Rodrigo (#16)
- "Thinkin' Bout Me" – Morgan Wallen (#7)
- "Thought You Should Know" – Morgan Wallen (#7)
- "Topia Twins" – Travis Scott feat. Rob49 and 21 Savage (#17)
- "Tourniquet" – Zach Bryan (#20)
- "TQG" – Karol G and Shakira (#7)
- "Try That in a Small Town" – Jason Aldean (#1)
- "Un x100to" – Grupo Frontera and Bad Bunny (#5)
- "Under the Influence" – Chris Brown (#12)
- "Underneath the Tree" – Kelly Clarkson (#11)
- "Unholy" – Sam Smith and Kim Petras (#1 in 2022, #2 in 2023)
- "Used to Be Young" – Miley Cyrus (#8)
- "Vampire" – Olivia Rodrigo (#1)
- "Virginia Beach" – Drake (#3)
- "Water" – Tyla (#10)
- "Welcome to New York (Taylor's Version)" – Taylor Swift (#14)
- "What Was I Made For?" – Billie Eilish (#14)
- "What Would Pluto Do" – Drake (#18)
- "Where She Goes" – Bad Bunny (#8)
- "White Christmas" – Bing Crosby (#12 in 1962, #15 in 2023)
- "White Horse" – Chris Stapleton (#12)
- "Wildest Dreams (Taylor's Version)" – Taylor Swift (#19)
- "You Broke My Heart" – Drake (#11)
- "You Proof" – Morgan Wallen (#5 in 2022, #8 in 2023)

== Deaths ==
- January 1 – Gangsta Boo, 43, rapper (Three 6 Mafia)
  - Fred White, 67, funk drummer (Earth, Wind & Fire)
- January 6 – Danny Kaleikini, 85, Hawaiian pop singer
- January 10 – Dennis Budimir, 84, jazz and rock guitarist (The Wrecking Crew)
- January 12 – Lisa Marie Presley, 54, pop rock singer-songwriter
- January 15 – C. J. Harris, 31, singer and American Idol season 13 contestant
- January 18 – Van Conner, 55, rock bassist (Screaming Trees)
  - David Crosby, 81, folk rock guitarist (The Byrds, Crosby, Stills, Nash & Young)
- January 26 – Dean Daughtry, 76, Southern rock keyboardist (Atlanta Rhythm Section)
- January 28 – Tom Verlaine, 73, rock guitarist (Television)
- January 31 – Charlie Thomas, 85, R&B singer (The Drifters)
- February 8 – Burt Bacharach, 94, composer, songwriter, producer, pianist
- February 12 – Trugoy the Dove, 54, rapper (De La Soul)
- February 17 – Kyle Jacobs, 49, country music songwriter, musician
- February 18 – Tom Whitlock, 68, pop rock songwriter
- March 2 – Wayne Shorter, 89, jazz saxophonist, composer (Weather Report)
- March 5 – Gary Rossington, 71, Southern rock guitarist (Lynyrd Skynyrd)
- March 14 – Bobby Caldwell, 71, R&B singer
- March 22 – Wayne Swinny, 59, rock guitarist (Saliva)
- March 29 – Brian Gillis, 48, pop singer (LFO)
- April 4 – Vivian Trimble, 59, rock keyboardist (Luscious Jackson)
- April 25 – Harry Belafonte, 96, singer, actor
- April 30 – Jordan Blake, 36, singer (A Skylit Drive)
- May 21 – Ed Ames, 95, pop singer, actor (Ames Brothers)
- May 23 – Sheldon Reynolds, 63, R&B guitarist (Sun, Commodores, Earth, Wind & Fire)
- May 24 – Bill Lee, 94, jazz bassist
  - George Maharis, 94, pop singer
  - Tina Turner, 83, R&B, rock, soul and pop singer (Ike & Tina Turner)
- June 1 – Cynthia Weil, 82, songwriter
- June 4 – George Winston, 74, pianist
- June 13 – Blackie Onassis, 57, rock drummer (Urge Overkill)
- June 18 – Big Pokey, 48, rapper (Screwed Up Click)
  - Teresa Taylor, 60, punk drummer (Butthole Surfers)
- June 23 – Jesse McReynolds, 93, bluegrass musician (Jim & Jesse)
- July 21 – Tony Bennett, 96, jazz and traditional pop singer
  - Neal Langford, 50, rock bassist (The Shins)
- July 26 – Randy Meisner, 77, country rock bassist and singer (Eagles, Poco)
- August 7 – DJ Casper, 58, DJ and songwriter, known for his dance song the "Cha Cha Slide"
- August 13 – Magoo, 50, rapper (Timbaland & Magoo)
- August 18 – Ray Hildebrand, 82, pop singer (Paul & Paula)
- August 28 – August 08, 31, R&B singer-songwriter and producer
- August 30 – Jack Sonni, 68, rock guitarist (Dire Straits)
- September 1 – Jimmy Buffett, 76, singer-songwriter
- September 4 – Steve Harwell, 56, pop rock singer (Smash Mouth)
  - Gary Wright, 80, singer-songwriter (Spooky Tooth)
- September 10 – Charlie Robison, 59, country music singer-songwriter
- September 16 – Irish Grinstead, 43, R&B singer (702)
- September 23 – Terry Kirkman, 83, pop singer-songwriter (The Association)
- October 9 – Buck Trent, 85, country music instrumentalist
- October 11 – Rudolph Isley, 84, R&B and soul singer-songwriter (The Isley Brothers)
- October 18 – Dwight Twilley, 72, power pop singer-songwriter
- November 20 – Mars Williams, 68, jazz and rock saxophonist (The Psychedelic Furs, The Waitresses)
- December 22 – Laura Lynch, 65, country music singer (founding member of the Dixie Chicks)

== See also ==
- 2023 in music
