= List of Billboard Streaming Songs number ones of 2023 =

This is a list of songs that reached number one on the Billboard magazine Streaming Songs chart in 2023.

== Chart history ==
Key
†	Indicates the most streamed song of 2023

Issue date	Song	Artist(s)	Weekly streams
January 7	"Rockin' Around the Christmas Tree"	Brenda Lee	46.87 million
January 14	"Kill Bill"	SZA	—
January 21	"Kill Bill"	SZA	31.1 million
January 28	"Flowers"	Miley Cyrus	52.6 million
February 4	"Flowers"	Miley Cyrus	59.8 million
February 11	"Flowers"	Miley Cyrus	48 million
February 18	"Flowers"	Miley Cyrus	38.7 million
February 25	"Kill Bill"	SZA	32.9 million
March 4	"Boy's a Liar Pt. 2"	PinkPantheress and Ice Spice	33.7 million
March 11	"Die for You"	The Weeknd and Ariana Grande	32.4 million
March 18	"Last Night" †	Morgan Wallen	47.5 million
March 25	"Last Night" †	Morgan Wallen	39.9 million
April 1	"Last Night" †	Morgan Wallen	35.9 million
April 8	"Last Night" †	Morgan Wallen	35.8 million
April 15	"Last Night" †	Morgan Wallen	35.1 million
April 22	"Search & Rescue"	Drake	33.8 million
April 29	"Last Night" †	Morgan Wallen	35.1 million
May 6	"Last Night" †	Morgan Wallen	33.7 million
May 13	"Ella Baila Sola"	Eslabon Armado and Peso Pluma	34.6 million
May 20	"Last Night" †	Morgan Wallen	34.3 million
May 27	"Last Night" †	Morgan Wallen	33 million
June 3	"Last Night" †	Morgan Wallen	32.7 million
June 10	"Last Night" †	Morgan Wallen	32.8 million
June 17	"Last Night" †	Morgan Wallen	31 million
June 24	"Last Night" †	Morgan Wallen	29.6 million
July 1	"Last Night" †	Morgan Wallen	29.8 million
July 8	"Last Night" †	Morgan Wallen	29.6 million
July 15	"Vampire"	Olivia Rodrigo	35.5 million
July 22	"Last Night" †	Morgan Wallen	28.6 million
July 29	"FukUMean"	Gunna	27.4 million
August 5	"Last Night" †	Morgan Wallen	—
August 12	"Meltdown"	Travis Scott featuring Drake	32.2 million
August 19	"Last Night" †	Morgan Wallen	26.3 million
August 26	"Last Night" †	Morgan Wallen	—
September 2	"Rich Men North of Richmond"	Oliver Anthony Music	22.9 million
September 9	"I Remember Everything"	Zach Bryan featuring Kacey Musgraves	33.7 million
September 16	"I Remember Everything"	Zach Bryan featuring Kacey Musgraves	31.7 million
September 23	"I Remember Everything"	Zach Bryan featuring Kacey Musgraves	30.1 million
September 30	"Slime You Out"	Drake featuring SZA	32.6 million
October 7	"Paint the Town Red"	Doja Cat	27.5 million
October 14	"I Remember Everything"	Zach Bryan featuring Kacey Musgraves	25.2 million
October 21	"First Person Shooter"	Drake featuring J. Cole	42.2 million
October 28	"IDGAF"	Drake featuring Yeat	26 million
November 4	"Cruel Summer"	Taylor Swift	21.3 million
November 11	"Is It Over Now?"	Taylor Swift	36 million
November 18	"Is It Over Now?"	Taylor Swift	21.1 million
November 25	"Lovin on Me"	Jack Harlow	22.2 million
December 2	"Lovin on Me"	Jack Harlow	23.6 million
December 9	"Rockin' Around the Christmas Tree"	Brenda Lee	34.9 million
December 16	"Rockin' Around the Christmas Tree"	Brenda Lee	41.3 million
December 23	"Rockin' Around the Christmas Tree"	Brenda Lee	42.4 million
December 30	"Rockin' Around the Christmas Tree"	Brenda Lee	49.4 million

== See also ==
- 2023 in American music
- List of Billboard Hot 100 number ones of 2023
