= Evil Ways =

Evil Ways may refer to:

- "Evil Ways" (Drake song), 2023
- "Evil Ways" (Santana song), 1969
