= Evil Ways (Drake song) =

2023 song by Drake featuring J. Cole

Song by Drake featuring J. Cole

from the album For All the Dogs Scary Hours Edition
- Released: November 17, 2023
- Recorded: November 11–16, 2023
- Length: 3:47
- Label: OVO; Republic
- Songwriters: Aubrey Graham; Jermaine Cole; Anderson Hernandez; Matthew Samuels; Michael Mulé; Isaac De Boni; Amir Sims; Charles Simmons, Jr.; David Bradshaw
- Producers: Vinylz; Boi-1da; FnZ; Fierce

"Evil Ways" is a song by Canadian rapper Drake from For All the Dogs Scary Hours Edition (2023), a reissue of his eighth studio album For All the Dogs (2023). It features American rapper J. Cole and was produced by Vinylz, Boi-1da, FnZ and Fierce.

== Critical reception ==
The song received generally favorable reviews from music critics. Alexander Cole of HotNewHipHop called the song a "spiritual successor" to Drake and J. Cole's previous collaboration "First Person Shooter" and wrote in regard of the structure, "It is a perfect dynamic and they do this style extremely well." Jordan Rose of Complex considered it the best song from For All the Dogs Scary Hours Edition. In an album review, Shahzaib Hussain of Clash commented "Drake moves listlessly, with eyes closed, through the haze of his memories, and that sense of dissonance with his surroundings comes to a head on 'Evil Ways', the 'Scary Hours Edition' most transparent moment. Here, Drake and J. Cole continue their fraternal repartee after last month's number one 'First Person Shooter', interplaying bravado, glazed portraits of youthful decline, and cautionary wisdom." Nadine Smith of HipHopDX was critical of the song, stating its feature "indicates how we're supposed to approach this manifestation of Drake: as a serious lyricist whose words intend to inspire deep reflection and analysis. But the strained wordplay and eye roll-inducing similes undercut any notion of Drake as a thoughtful writer, and overshadow the intricacies of his beat selections."

== Charts ==
Chart performance for "Evil Ways"
Chart (2023)	Peak position
Canada Hot 100 (Billboard)	31
Global 200 (Billboard)	50
Greece International (IFPI)	97
New Zealand Hot Singles (RMNZ)	5
US Billboard Hot 100	26
US Hot R&B/Hip-Hop Songs (Billboard)	10
