= Wiseman (song) =

2012 unreleased song by Frank Ocean

Song by Frank Ocean
- Released: December 23, 2012 (Tumblr)
- Genre: Alternative R&B
- Length: 3:51
- Songwriter(s): Christopher Breaux

"Wiseman" (also known as "Wise Man" or "WiseMan") is an unreleased song by the American R&B singer Frank Ocean. The song was written in 2012 for the movie Django Unchained, but was cut. Ocean later posted the song on his Tumblr page on December 23, 2012. "Wiseman" was later featured in the 2015 film Southpaw. The track gained notoriety in 2023 after Ocean performed a punk rock version of it at the Coachella music festival. That same year, the Canadian rapper Drake featured a prominent vocal sample of "Wiseman" on his song "Virginia Beach".

On "Wiseman", Ocean presents his thoughts on the deep emotional effects of slavery, commenting on its relationship to family and personal strength and reflecting upon the struggle of slaves throughout American history. The track features guitars and violins evocative of Western film soundtracks. "Wiseman" was met with positive reception from critics, who praised the song's lyrics and themes.

== Release and composition ==
In a November 2012 interview with GQ, Ocean mentioned that he had many projects in development, including a song written for the film Django Unchained, directed by Quentin Tarantino, which was set for release later that year. However, Tarantino cut the song from the film's score, saying that he thought the song was a "fantastic ballad", but "there just wasn't a scene for it". He said "I could have thrown it in quickly just to have it, but that's not why [Ocean] wrote it and not his intention." On December 23, 2012, Ocean released "Wiseman" via his Tumblr site, stating that "Django was ill without it." The song was also featured on a 2013 bootleg vinyl pressing of unreleased Ocean songs titled Unreleased, Misc. "Wiseman" also appeared in the 2015 film Southpaw.

At Coachella 2023, during Ocean's headlining performance, he performed a "punk rock" remix of the song. The opening track "Virginia Beach" from Canadian rapper Drake's 2023 album For All the Dogs features a prominent vocal sample of "Wiseman", whose integration was praised by critics.

According to Mike Wolf of American Songwriter, "Wiseman" encapsulates the struggles of Django Unchained's titular character, mirroring the "timeless" struggle of slaves throughout American history. Natalie Maher of Billboard wrote that the song contains themes of "family, reincarnation and strength", with lyrics depicting the lasting psychological effects of slavery. The track has been described by both Tarantino and music critics as a ballad, with Ocean singing over guitar notes reminiscent of classic Western film soundtracks.

== Critical reception ==
"Wiseman" received positive reception from critics, who praised Ocean's performance and the song's lyrics and themes. Maher called the song "wildly beautiful", and commended the handling of its themes. Chris Martins from Spin praised the track's "shimmering electric guitar" and "contemplative lyrics", comparing it to Ocean's previous mixtape, Nostalgia, Ultra. Wolf enjoyed the song's lyrical depth, saying it was a "great example of a three-minute song saying more than a nearly three-hour movie" and that it was "everything that the film was not." Slate writer Aisha Harris expanded on this sentiment, saying "Wiseman" was "hauntingly beautiful, and it doesn't belong in Django Unchained." She explained that, unlike the film, Ocean probed deeply into "the psychological and emotional effects of slavery." Harris also likened the song to a previous Ocean ballad, "Bad Religion", due to its similar minimal instrumentation.
