= Amen (Drake song) =

2023 song by Drake featuring Teezo Touchdown

Song by Drake featuring Teezo Touchdown

from the album For All the Dogs
- Released: October 6, 2023
- Genre: Christian hip hop
- Length: 2:21
- Label: OVO; Republic
- Songwriters: Aubrey Graham; Aaron Thomas; Kai Wright; Ben Scholefield; Rudolph Stanfield
- Producers: Sango; Budgie; Teezo Touchdown (add.)

"Amen" is a song by Canadian rapper Drake featuring American rapper Teezo Touchdown, from the former's eighth studio album For All the Dogs (2023). It was produced by Sango, Budgie and Teezo Touchdown.

== Composition ==
The song uses elements of gospel, while the lyrics focus on Drake seeking deliverance due to his past actions.

== Critical reception ==
Billboard's Kyle Denis ranked the track as the twentieth best track on the album. Denis compared the track to "Ciara’s Prayer" by Ciara and Summer Walker, stating that "Amen" is Drake's version of it. The song received mixed reviews from music critics. Jessica McKinney of Complex picked the song as the "biggest skip" from For All the Dogs and regarded it as "blasphemous". Shahzaib Hussain of Clash wrote favorably of the song, stating "the gospel-rap of 'Amen' is a highlight, pairing Teezo's idiosyncratic punk croon with Drake's search for deliverance; in women, in God, in himself." Louis Pavlakos of HipHopDX commented "'Amen,' not even his best song with this track title, bizarrely employs Teezo Touchdown to do the harmonizing. Considering Teezo's appeal is on the quirkier side of Hip Hop, Drake sounds behind and even, uncomfortable." Charles Holmes of The Ringer wrote "Teezo Touchdown's shaky, lovelorn croon on 'Amen' is perfectly fine in a vacuum, but Drake's disaffected tone renders it inert and cloying."

== Charts ==
Chart performance for "Amen"
Chart (2023)	Peak position
Australia (ARIA)	26
Australia Hip Hop/R&B (ARIA)	11
Canada Hot 100 (Billboard)	17
France (SNEP)	80
Global 200 (Billboard)	18
Greece International (IFPI)	19
Iceland (Tónlistinn)	27
Italy (FIMI)	84
Lithuania (AGATA)	89
New Zealand (Recorded Music NZ)	32
Portugal (AFP)	44
South Africa Streaming (TOSAC)	8
Sweden Heatseeker (Sverigetopplistan)	8
UK Audio Streaming (Official Charts)	30
UK Hip Hop/R&B (Official Charts)	8
US Billboard Hot 100	15
US Hot R&B/Hip-Hop Songs (Billboard)	11
