= 7969 Santa =

2023 song by Drake

Song by Drake

from the album For All the Dogs
- Released: October 6, 2023
- Length: 4:19
- Label: OVO; Republic
- Songwriters: Aubrey Graham; Aaron Thomas; Alex Lustig; Nyan Lieberthal; Benjamin Saint Fort; Jahaan Sweet; Keith Cozart; Tavares Taylor; Tyree Pittman
- Producers: Lustig; Nyan; Bnyx; Sweet

"7969 Santa" is a song by Canadian rapper Drake from his eighth studio album For All the Dogs (2023). Produced by Alex Lustig, Nyan, Bnyx and Jahaan Sweet, it has an uncredited feature from American singer Teezo Touchdown and an outro from American rapper Snoop Dogg, as well as a sample of "I Don't Like" by Chief Keef featuring Lil Reese.

== Composition ==
The song is about a failed relationship between Drake and a 25-year-old partner, which (according to Drake) she blames on her youth, and describes how she violated his trust. At one point it also incorporates "I Don't Like" in the background.

== Critical reception ==
Billboard's Kyle Denis ranked the track as the thirteenth best track on the album. Denis wrote that "the song itself is solid", but stated that Teezo Touchdown's interlude "[stole] the show". Drea Oppan of Complex praised the song's sample, while Josh Herring of The Line of Best Fit cited it as among the "moments that slip under the rug" in For All the Dogs.

== Charts ==
Chart performance for "7969 Santa"
Chart (2023)	Peak position
Australia (ARIA)	66
Australia Hip Hop/R&B (ARIA)	23
Canada Hot 100 (Billboard)	16
France (SNEP)	103
Global 200 (Billboard)	19
Greece International (IFPI)	18
Iceland (Tónlistinn)	25
Lithuania (AGATA)	59
Portugal (AFP)	59
South Africa (Billboard)	15
Sweden Heatseeker (Sverigetopplistan)	20
UK Audio Streaming (OCC)	34
US Billboard Hot 100	16
US Hot R&B/Hip-Hop Songs (Billboard)	12
