= You Broke My Heart =

2023 song by Drake

Single by Drake

from the album For All the Dogs Scary Hours Edition
- Released: November 28, 2023
- Recorded: 2023
- Genre: Trap
- Length: 3:50
- Label: OVO; Republic
- Songwriters: Aubrey Graham; Anderson Hernandez; Michael Mulé; Isaac De Boni; Alexander Morand; Kenny Thomas; Frank Wilson
- Producers: Vinylz; FnZ

Drake singles chronology
"First Person Shooter" (2023)	"You Broke My Heart" (2023)	"Act II: Date @ 8" (remix) (2024)

"You Broke My Heart" is a song by Canadian rapper Drake from For All the Dogs Scary Hours Edition (2023), a reissue of his eighth studio album For All the Dogs (2023). It was produced by Vinylz and FnZ. It impacted US rhythmic radio as the fifth single on November 28, 2023.

== Composition ==
The song contains "stuttery" trap beats with string instruments in the production. Through a rap-sung performance and Auto-Tuned vocals as it also contains elements of rage rap, Drake criticizes his former partner. In the bridge, he chants "Fuck my ex".

== Critical reception ==
The song received generally positive reviews from music critics. Jordan Rose of Complex considered it the best song from For All the Dogs Scary Hours Edition. Shahzaib Hussain of Clash described the bridge as "the apex of Drake's dismissal with bleak diaristic lines that draw a sharp intake of breath, or an eye roll." In an album review, Nadine Smith of HipHopDX called it "The one track that sees Drake put aside the try-hard lyrical miracle aspirations" and "the kind of triumphantly vindictive anthem that few artists can do better."

== Charts ==
=== Weekly charts ===
Weekly chart performance for "You Broke My Heart"
Chart (2023–2024)	Peak position
Canada Hot 100 (Billboard)	8
Global 200 (Billboard)	21
Greece International (IFPI)	50
Ireland (IRMA)	48
New Zealand Hot Singles (RMNZ)	4
Sweden Heatseeker (Sverigetopplistan)	18
US Billboard Hot 100	11
US Hot R&B/Hip-Hop Songs (Billboard)	5
US Rhythmic Airplay (Billboard)	2

=== Year-end charts ===
2024 year-end chart performance for "You Broke My Heart"
Chart (2024)	Position
US Hot R&B/Hip-Hop Songs (Billboard)	29
US Rhythmic (Billboard)	20

== Certifications ==
Certifications for "You Broke My Heart"
Region	Certification	Certified units/sales
New Zealand (RMNZ)	Gold	15,000^{‡}
^{‡} Sales+streaming figures based on certification alone.
