= Daylight (Drake song) =

2023 song by Drake

Song by Drake

from the album For All the Dogs
- Released: October 6, 2023
- Genre: Trap
- Length: 2:44
- Label: OVO; Republic
- Songwriters: Aubrey Graham; Joshua Luellen; Matthew-Kyle Brown; T. Cremeni; Alessio Bevilacqua; Adonis Graham
- Producers: Southside; Smatt; T9C (co.); Lil Esso (add.)

"Daylight" is a song by Canadian rapper Drake from his eighth studio album For All the Dogs (2023). It was produced by Southside and Smatt, with co-production from T9C and additional production from Lil Esso. The song features additional vocals from Drake's son Adonis Graham.

== Composition ==
The song begins with dialogue by Tony Montana sampled from the 1983 film Scarface and contains a trap beat, In the chorus, Drake mentions someone being shot in broad daylight, before addressing rumors concerning him on the Internet. These lyrics have been speculated to refer to rapper XXXTentacion, who had a feud with Drake, and rumors of Drake's involvement in his 2018 murder. Two minutes into the song, the beat switches and is followed by a rap verse from Adonis.

== Critical reception ==
Billboard's Kyle Denis ranked the track as the twelfth best track on the album. Denis wrote that "Drake’s villain era feels quite forced" while describing the production as "ominous oscillating synths". The song received generally negative reviews from music critics. Nadine Smith of The Independent cited it as a song in which Drake "strains to fit over the futuristic 'rage' sound popularised by Playboi Carti." Mosi Reeves of Rolling Stone wrote, "Skeptics who bemoan the 36-year-old superstar's Peter Pan-like immaturity will cite 'Daylight,' where he claims, 'I'm trying to fuck all the bitches that look at my ex,' then invites his five-year-old son Adonis to drop a verse at track's end." Luke Morgan Britton of NME also criticized the aforementioned line, stating "Any boyish charm has abandoned him on 'For All The Dogs' though, instead replaced with bitterness, pettiness and finger-pointing at the supposed flaws of women in Drake's life." Paul Attard of Slant Magazine disapproved of Drake "claiming that he's going to shoot someone atop a Fisher-Price-grade trap beat" in the song. Josh Herring of The Line of Best Fit described Adonis' verse as "cute but out of place". Chris Richards of The Washington Post regarded the audio sample from Scarface as the "most embarrassing moment" on For All the Dogs.

== Charts ==
Chart performance for "Daylight"
Chart (2023)	Peak position
Australia (ARIA)	21
Australia Hip Hop/R&B (ARIA)	9
Canada Hot 100 (Billboard)	5
France (SNEP)	96
Global 200 (Billboard)	12
Greece International (IFPI)	11
Iceland (Tónlistinn)	15
Italy (FIMI)	78
Latvia (LAIPA)	20
Lithuania (AGATA)	48
Luxembourg (Billboard)	23
New Zealand (Recorded Music NZ)	26
Portugal (AFP)	49
South Africa Streaming (TOSAC)	10
Sweden Heatseeker (Sverigetopplistan)	4
Swiss Streaming (Schweizer Hitparade)	31
UAE (IFPI)	19
UK Audio Streaming (Official Charts)	25
US Billboard Hot 100	8
US Hot R&B/Hip-Hop Songs (Billboard)	8
