= Slime You Out =

2023 single by Drake featuring SZA

Single by Drake featuring SZA

from the album For All the Dogs
- Released: September 15, 2023
- Genre: R&B
- Length: 5:10
- Label: OVO; Republic
- Songwriters: Aubrey Graham; Solána Rowe; Noel Cadastre; Noah Shebib; Benjamin Saint Fort; Dalton Tennant; Chris Powell; Grant Lapointe
- Producers: Drake; Cadastre

Drake singles chronology
"Meltdown" (2023)	"Slime You Out" (2023)	"8AM in Charlotte" (2023)

SZA singles chronology
"Snooze" (2023)	"Slime You Out" (2023)	"Rich Baby Daddy" (2023)

Lyric video
- "Slime You Out" on YouTube

"Slime You Out" is a song by Canadian rapper Drake featuring American singer-songwriter SZA. It was released through OVO Sound and Republic Records as the lead single from Drake's eighth studio album, For All the Dogs, on September 15, 2023 to mixed reviews. The R&B song was produced by Drake himself and Noel Cadastre and co-produced by 40, Bnyx, and Dalton Tennant, and written by the five alongside SZA, Chris Powell, and Grant Lapointe, due to the song sampling "Just Ask Me" by the Soul Superbs. It debuted at number one on the US Billboard Hot 100, becoming Drake's twelfth and SZA's second number-one single on the chart.

== Background ==
Both artists were first linked together in the lyrics of "Mr. Right Now" (2020), when Drake revealed that he had dated her back in 2008. SZA initially responded by unfollowing the rapper on Instagram. However, she later confirmed that they indeed dated back in 2009 and that it was "all love all peace". In December 2022, she once again confirmed that they have had always been "cool" with each other.

On September 14, 2023, Drake and SZA shared a single cover of Halle Berry covered in slime at the 2012 Kids' Choice Awards on their social media, alluding to a collaboration. However, the posts did not contain any further information besides the artists tagging each other. Berry voiced out her disappointment in Drake on Instagram, stating that when she was asked by the rapper's team to give him permission to use her picture as a single cover, she refused. The single was eventually announced on September 15, without the cover.

== Reception ==
"Slime You Out" received mainly mixed reviews from critics, with SZA's feature receiving praise and the lyrics receiving criticism.

Billboard's Kyle Denis ranks the track at #15 out of the 23 songs on Drake's For All the Dogs. In his review of the song, he stated that the track is "far from the worst offering on For All the Dogs." He noted that "there are at least some real stakes and tension," however, "it’s still miles away from the surefire stunner that a SZA-Drake duet should be, but it’s not a complete waste of space."

American radio host Charlamagne tha God said on his podcast “Drake put out a song last Friday and nobody cared” as well as “Well, it's Drake and SZA. People’s curiosity is going to make them go stream the record and of course, radio is going to play the hell out of it.” Drake responded calling Charlamagne an “off brand Morris Chestnut”. Charlamagne later joked his hate for the song was planned after it hit number one “I told y’all yesterday that Drake and I plan these things every time he drops certain records. He wants me to hate on them because all noise is great noise nowadays. And I told y’all the play but nobody believes me ’cause I'm lying. But you should believe me even when I'm lying.”

Fans also had problems with the lyrics, accusing the singer of "treating women like slaves".

== Charts ==
=== Weekly charts ===
Weekly chart performance for "Slime You Out"
Chart (2023)	Peak position
Australia (ARIA)	12
Australia Hip Hop/R&B (ARIA)	3
Austria (Ö3 Austria Top 40)	50
Canada Hot 100 (Billboard)	2
Denmark (Tracklisten)	21
France (SNEP)	77
Germany (GfK)	56
Global 200 (Billboard)	3
Greece International (IFPI)	7
Iceland (Tónlistinn)	8
Ireland (IRMA)	13
Italy (FIMI)	64
Latvia (LAIPA)	17
Lithuania (AGATA)	40
Luxembourg (Billboard)	11
MENA (IFPI)	16
Netherlands (Single Top 100)	37
Netherlands (Tipparade)	16
New Zealand (Recorded Music NZ)	9
Norway (VG-lista)	19
Portugal (AFP)	25
South Africa Streaming (TOSAC)	3
Sweden (Sverigetopplistan)	26
Switzerland (Schweizer Hitparade)	19
UAE (IFPI)	10
UK Singles (OCC)	10
UK Hip Hop/R&B (OCC)	3
US Billboard Hot 100	1
US Hot R&B/Hip-Hop Songs (Billboard)	1
US R&B/Hip-Hop Airplay (Billboard)	33
US Rhythmic Airplay (Billboard)	21

=== Year-end charts ===
2023 year-end chart performance for "Slime You Out"
Chart (2023)	Position
US Hot R&B/Hip-Hop Songs (Billboard)	62

2024 year-end chart performance for "Slime You Out"
Chart (2024)	Position
US Hot R&B/Hip-Hop Songs (Billboard)	58

== Certifications ==
Certifications for "Slime You Out"
Region	Certification	Certified units/sales
Australia (ARIA)	Gold	35,000^{‡}
Brazil (Pro-Música Brasil)	Gold	20,000^{‡}
New Zealand (RMNZ)	Gold	15,000^{‡}
United Kingdom (BPI)	Silver	200,000^{‡}
United States (RIAA)	2× Platinum	2,000,000^{‡}
^{‡} Sales+streaming figures based on certification alone.

== See also ==
- List of Billboard Hot 100 number ones of 2023
- List of Billboard Hot 100 top-ten singles in 2023
- List of Billboard Streaming Songs number ones of 2023
