= Gently (song) =

2023 song by Drake featuring Bad Bunny

Song by Drake featuring Bad Bunny

from the album For All the Dogs
- Language: English; Spanish
- Released: October 6, 2023
- Genre: Reggaeton; dembow
- Length: 2:13
- Label: OVO; Republic
- Songwriters: Aubrey Graham; Benito Martínez; Diamanté Blackmon; Ozan Yildirim; Nik Frascona
- Producers: Gordo; Oz; Nik D

"Gently" is a song by Canadian rapper Drake from his eighth studio album For All the Dogs (2023). It features Puerto Rican rapper Bad Bunny and was produced by Gordo, Oz and Nik D. It is Drake's third collaboration with Bad Bunny, following 2018's "Mia" and 2020's "Loyal (Remix)" with PartyNextDoor.

== Composition ==
"Gently" is a reggaeton song inspired by Latin trap. It finds Drake rapping in both English and Spanish. The song is written in the key of B♭ major with an initial tempo of 70 beats per minute, later transitioning to 108 BPM.

== Critical reception ==
Billboard's Kyle Denis ranked the track as the sixteenth best track on the album. Denis wrote that the track isn't "particularly memorable in the context of the full album". The song received mostly negative reviews from music critics, who particularly criticized Drake's performance in Spanish. Julianne Escobedo Shepherd of Pitchfork commented "Bad Bunny sounds like he dialed in his verse from the Sprinter en route to the Gucci show while Drake deploys his best seventh-grade Spanish on a dembow beat—('My broski Benito, he needs a bonita,' et cetera)—and yet it's still a high point far away from Drake's darkness." Shaad D'Souza of The Guardian stated the song "is downright goofy, Drake slipping between Spanish-language rapping and fake-Spanish-language rapping like the Puerto Rican superstar's cartoonish sidekick." NME's Luke Morgan Britton wrote "Even the Latin-infused 'Gently', basically Drake-doing-Dembow, feels like a cynical marketing ploy that not even Bad Bunny's effortless cool can save." Louis Pavlakos of HipHopDX commented the song "is Drake's second attempt at making reggaeton but he sounds lost singing in Spanish alongside Bad Bunny." Slant Magazine's Paul Attard described Drake as "poorly rapping in Spanglish" and The Line of Best Fit's Josh Herring cited Drake's "awful Spanish" in the song as one of the album's "moments that slip under the rug".

Shahzaib Hussain of Clash responded positively to the song, writing "the Spanglish reggaeton heat of 'Gently' is also Drake at his sinuous, shapeshifting best."

== Charts ==
Chart performance for "Gently"
| Chart (2023) | Peak position |
|---|---|
| Australia (ARIA) | 94 |
| Australia Hip Hop/R&B (ARIA) | 37 |
| Canada Hot 100 (Billboard) | 12 |
| Denmark (Tracklisten) | 36 |
| France (SNEP) | 94 |
| Germany (GfK) | 94 |
| Global 200 (Billboard) | 10 |
| Greece International (IFPI) | 16 |
| Italy (FIMI) | 38 |
| Lithuania (AGATA) | 63 |
| Luxembourg (Billboard) | 18 |
| Portugal (AFP) | 37 |
| Spain (PROMUSICAE) | 43 |
| Sweden (Sverigetopplistan) | 53 |
| Switzerland (Schweizer Hitparade) | 49 |
| UAE (IFPI) | 20 |
| UK Audio Streaming (OCC) | 45 |
| US Billboard Hot 100 | 12 |
| US Hot Latin Songs (Billboard) | 1 |

== Certifications ==
Certifications for "Gently"
| Region | Certification | Certified units/sales |
|---|---|---|
| Spain (PROMUSICAE) | Gold | 30,000^{‡} |
Streaming
| Central America (CFC) | Gold | 3,500,000^{†} |
^{‡} Sales+streaming figures based on certification alone.^{†} Streaming-only figures based on certification alone.
