= Fear of Heights (song) =

2023 song by Drake

Song by Drake

from the album For All the Dogs
- Released: October 6, 2023
- Genre: Hip hop; rage
- Length: 2:35
- Label: OVO; Republic
- Songwriters: Aubrey Graham; Ozan Yildirim; Darryl Clemons; Nik Frascona; Machado Joseph; Benjamin Saint Fort; Douglas Ford; Simon Gebrelul
- Producers: Oz; Pooh Beatz; Nik D; XYNothing; Bnyx (add.)

"Fear of Heights" is a song by Canadian rapper Drake from his eighth studio album For All the Dogs (2023). It was produced by Oz, Pooh Beatz, Nik D, XYNothing and Bnyx. The song has been considered a diss primarily aimed at Barbadian singer Rihanna, who was allegedly in an on-again, off-again relationship with Drake from 2009 to 2016.

== Composition and lyrics ==
The lyrics of the song are widely believed to be referring to Rihanna, although her name is not mentioned. It starts with Drake singing "Why they make it sound like I'm still hung up on you? That could never be"; in the intro, he repeatedly plays on the word "anti", alluding to Rihanna's album of the same name. He further claims "the sex was average with you" and "I had way badder bitches than you", before finishing with a taunt that her lover probably takes her to Antigua for vacation, which has been regarded as a diss toward American rapper ASAP Rocky, Rihanna's boyfriend and father of her two children. Drake also interpolates the song "Can Your Pussy Do The Dog?" by The Cramps. The second half of the song centers on his self-indulgent lifestyle, while he takes shots at rapper Pusha T.

Stylistically, the song uses a similar sound to that of rage.

== Critical reception ==
The song received generally negative reviews. Billboard's Kyle Denis ranked the track as the twenty-first best track on the album. Denis wrote that the track "features some of the worst hooks of Drake's career" and that Drake's voice is so "bereft of energy", resulting in the track beginning to "drag". However, Denis praised the verses, noting that they "are actually some of the most interesting on the whole record". Nadine Smith of The Independent criticized how Drake "wants to handcuff" women on the song, which she also cited as a track in which "he strains to fit over the futuristic 'rage' sound popularised by Playboi Carti." Likewise, Paul Attard of Slant Magazine criticized the song for Drake "trying his hand at watered-down rage music". Variety's Alex Swhear described the song as having a "bottom-tier Drake hook". Pitchfork's Julianne Escobedo Shepherd commented "Drake demonstrates how hurt he is by making a song about how not hurt he is." In a review of For All the Dogs, Aron A. of HotNewHipHop stated "The problem is that it feels as though Drake hasn't moved on, which is especially true on songs like 'Fear Of Heights.' Contrastingly, 'Fear Of Heights' comes through with the rugged and aggressive tone that has made Drake's rap records feel riveting as of late. However, the perceived shots at Rihanna and ASAP Rocky feel too petty for a man who admittedly 'had badder b*tches than you.'" Charles Holmes of The Ringer wrote of the song, "to prove he's unbothered, we're inundated with boorish lines that have the interiority of a barn owl", additionally pointing out that a particular lyric "disregards the fact that the Fenty mogul is a billionaire and Drake is not—so affordable vacations are the least of her concerns."

== Charts ==
Chart performance for "Fear of Heights"
Chart (2023)	Peak position
Australia (ARIA)	22
Australia Hip Hop/R&B (ARIA)	10
Canada Hot 100 (Billboard)	8
France (SNEP)	90
Global 200 (Billboard)	13
Greece International (IFPI)	13
Iceland (Tónlistinn)	21
Italy (FIMI)	81
Lithuania (AGATA)	50
Luxembourg (Billboard)	24
New Zealand (Recorded Music NZ)	28
Portugal (AFP)	48
South Africa Streaming (TOSAC)	9
Sweden Heatseeker (Sverigetopplistan)	6
Swiss Streaming (Schweizer Hitparade)	32
UAE (IFPI)	18
UK Audio Streaming (Official Charts)	24
US Billboard Hot 100	10
US Hot R&B/Hip-Hop Songs (Billboard)	9
