= For All the Dogs =

2023 studio album by Drake

Studio album by Drake
- Released: October 6, 2023
- Recorded: 2022–2023
- Genre: Hip-hop
- Length: 84:50
- Languages: English; Spanish
- Labels: OVO; Republic
- Producers: 40; the Alchemist; Alex Lustig; Anthoine Walters; Bangs; Beatmenace; Bnyx; Boi-1da; TheBoyKam; Budgie; Cash Cobain; Childboy; Conductor Williams; DJ Screw; Dnny Phntm; Drake; Eli Brown; Fierce; FnZ; Gent!; Gordo; Harley Arsenault; Jahaan Sweet; JayStolaa; Jdolla; Justin Raisen; Kid Masterpiece; Klahr; Lil Yachty; Liohn; Lukas; Maneesh; Mario Luciano; Nik D; Noel Cadastre; Nyan; Ovrkast; Oz; Pooh Beatz; PoWRTrav; Quasi; SadPony; Sango; Sauceboy; Scotty Coleman; Slatt; Southside; Stwo; Tay Keith; Tommy Parker; Vinylz; XYNothing; Young Troy

Drake chronology
Her Loss (2022)	For All the Dogs (2023)	100 Gigs (2024)

For All the Dogs Scary Hours Edition cover

Singles from For All the Dogs
- 1. "Slime You Out" Released: September 15, 2023; 2. "8AM in Charlotte" Released: October 5, 2023; 3. "Rich Baby Daddy" Released: October 13, 2023; 4. "First Person Shooter" Released: October 24, 2023

Singles from For All the Dogs Scary Hours Edition
- 1. "You Broke My Heart" Released: November 28, 2023

For All the Dogs is the eighth studio album by the Canadian rapper Drake. It was released by OVO Sound and Republic Records on October 6, 2023. The album features guest appearances from Teezo Touchdown, 21 Savage, J. Cole, Yeat, SZA, PartyNextDoor, Chief Keef, Bad Bunny, Sexyy Red, and Lil Yachty. Production was handled by Drake, Teezo Touchdown, Lil Yachty, 40, Sango, Oz, Bnyx, Southside, Boi-1da, Vinylz, Tay Keith, FnZ, Jahaan Sweet, the late DJ Screw, Stwo, Gordo, Justin Raisen, and the Alchemist, among others.

Drake first teased For All the Dogs in January 2023, and developed it mostly during the It's All a Blur Tour. Originally set for release in September 2023, the album was delayed several times and follows both of his albums released in 2022: his seventh album, Honestly, Nevermind, and his collaborative album with 21 Savage, Her Loss. For All the Dogs was supported by five singles: "Slime You Out", "8AM in Charlotte", "Rich Baby Daddy", "First Person Shooter", and "You Broke My Heart", with the latter appearing on the Scary Hours deluxe edition of the album. "Slime You Out" and "First Person Shooter" reached number one on the Billboard Hot 100, marking Drake's twelfth and thirteenth US number one singles.

Upon the album's release, critical reception was mixed, with praise for its production but criticism for its length and some of its lyrics. For All the Dogs ended up on year-end lists by several publications as one of the best albums of the year. The album set various regional and global sales records. In the United States, it opened with first-week sales of 402,000 album-equivalent units and topped the Billboard 200 chart, becoming the year's highest-selling rap album. It also earned 514.01 million global on-demand streams in the debut week, which was the largest streaming week of 2023.

== Background and promotion ==
On January 21, 2023, during his free concert at the Apollo Theater, Drake teased the release of an album, saying he wanted to "strike up more emotions, maybe this year". He also responded to the negative reception of his previous few albums, stating: "I've thought about a bunch of things in life, but at this moment in time none of those things are stopping making music for [the fans]".

On June 23, Drake announced that his poetry book titled Titles Ruin Everything, which was co-written with songwriter Kenza Samir and previously teased in summer 2022, would be released on July 14. One day later, full advertisements on the front-page of the New York Post contained an incorporated QR code. Upon scanning, the QR code redirected to a landing page with a picture of two puppies above a statement: "I made an album to go with the book... They say they miss the old Drake, girl don't tempt me. For all the dogs". Its title was soon officially confirmed by OVO and Republic.

During his performance in Detroit on July 9 for the It's All a Blur Tour, his co-headlining tour with 21 Savage, Drake announced that Nicki Minaj would appear on the album. The track was later revealed to be "Needle", which appeared on Minaj's 2023 album Pink Friday 2 instead; Drake believed it did not fit the album sonically and gave it to Minaj. Drake then announced Bad Bunny would appear on the album during a performance in Los Angeles on August 13; he appears on "Gently". Eight days later, Drake revealed the album artwork, drawn by his son, Adonis. On August 22, Amazon Music announced on social media that the album would be released in three days along with praising Adonis for the drawing, but the statement was later deleted.

On September 6, Drake confirmed the album would be released on September 22. Two days after the announcement, he shared a trailer video for the album, which was a flashback of his father, Dennis Graham, performing on the Canadian television series Stormy Monday with Danny Marks in the early 1990s. Exactly ten days after the announcement, he announced that the album would be delayed by exactly two weeks due to the ongoing tour and would be released on October 6. Drake revealed the tracklist on October 5, one day before the album was released.

=== Singles ===
The lead single of the album, "Slime You Out", which features American singer-songwriter SZA, was released on September 15, 2023. The song debuted at number one on the Billboard Hot 100, giving Drake his twelfth US number-one single and SZA her second. The second single of the album, "8AM in Charlotte", was released on October 5, 2023. The official music video was released through Drake's Instagram account on the same day. The song debuted at number 17 on the Billboard Hot 100. The third single of the album, "Rich Baby Daddy", which features American rapper Sexyy Red and SZA, was sent to Italian contemporary hit radio on October 13, 2023. The song debuted at number 11 on the Billboard Hot 100. On February 14, 2024, its music video was released. The fourth single of the album, "First Person Shooter", which features J. Cole, was sent to US rhythmic contemporary radio on October 24, 2023. The song debuted at number one on the Billboard Hot 100. Its music video was released on November 15, 2023. The fifth single of the album, "You Broke My Heart", was sent to rhythmic contemporary radio on November 28, 2023. The song peaked at number 11 on the Billboard Hot 100. Its music video was released on December 20, 2023.

== Music and lyrical themes ==
The standard edition of For All the Dogs contains twenty-three tracks, with a playing time of over 84 minutes. On November 17, 2023, the For All the Dogs Scary Hours Edition was released with an additional six tracks, making the total playing time over 108 minutes.

=== Composition and production ===
For All the Dogs is a hip-hop record with production described as a "sterilised studio sheen" that wanders to "an earthy fusion of soul samples and boom-bap drums". The album incorporates elements of contemporary rap, pop rap, hardcore rap, and trap. The majority of the album's production was handled by Drake's OVO Sound in-house-producers, Noah "40" Shebib and Boi-1da, alongside production from Lil Yachty, Bnyx, Gordo, and Drake himself, among several others.

=== Themes ===
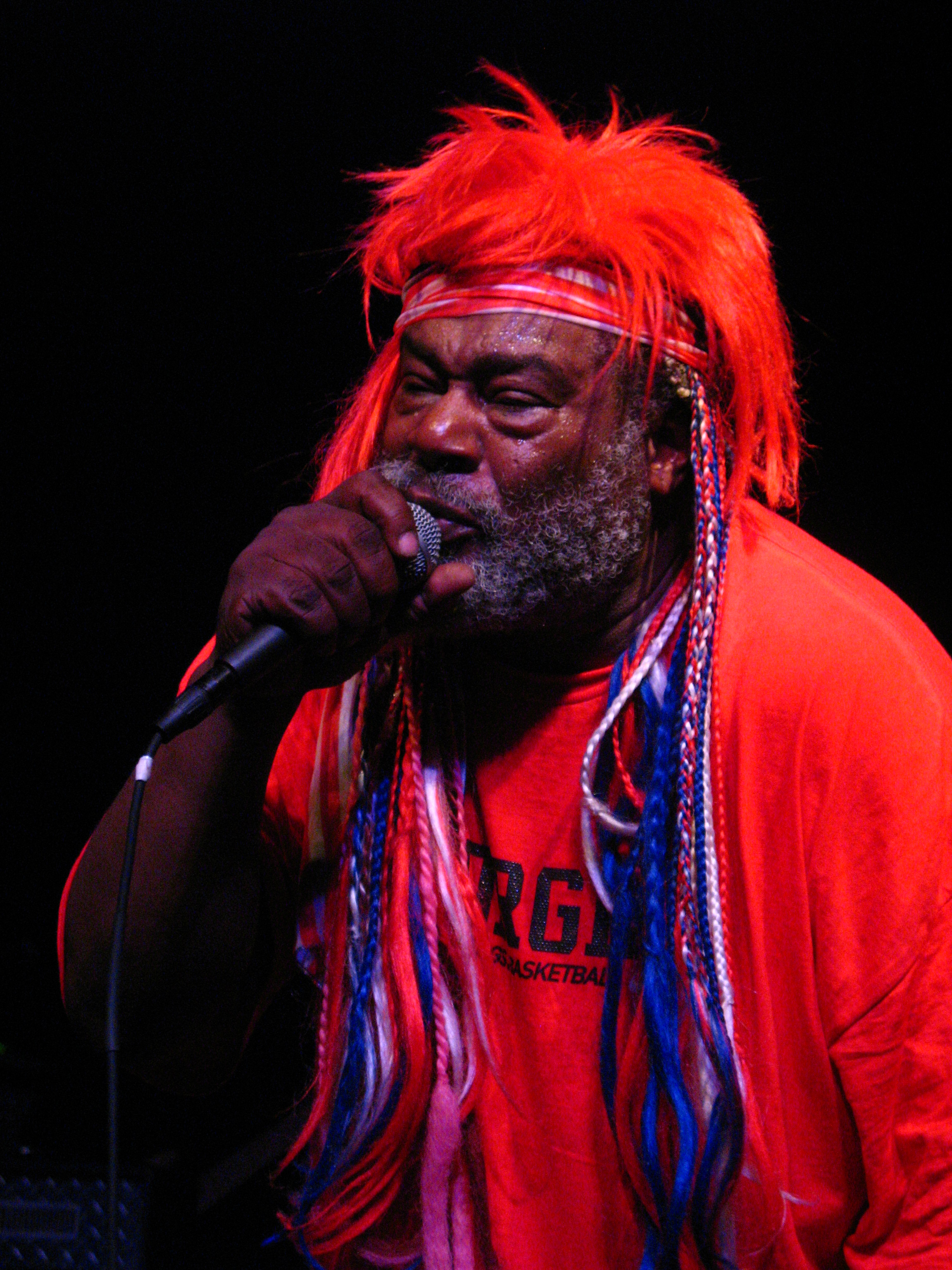
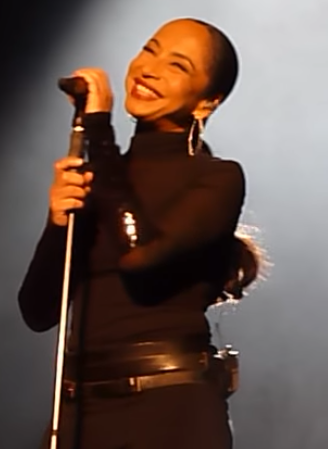
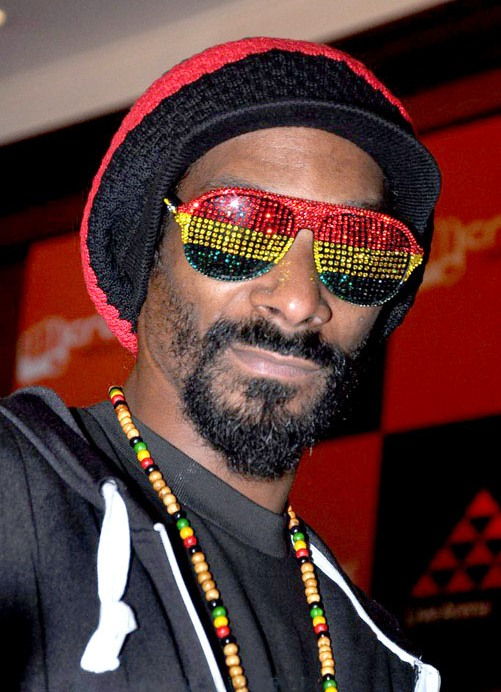
George Clinton (pictured, left) does the outro on "All the Parties", Sade Adu (pictured, middle) does the outro on "BBL Love" (Interlude), and Snoop Dogg (pictured, right) does the outro on "7969 Santa".

The themes on the album are reminiscent of several of Drake's previous albums, including Nothing Was the Same (2013) and Certified Lover Boy (2021). Throughout the project spanning over 84 minutes, Drake covers topics of "petty relationship drama, rich-guy flexes, and a handful of subliminal disses".

Furthermore, throughout the album, there is a radio show theme that slips in and out of focus. Several artists appear at the end of tracks as if they are hosting a radio station by the name of "BARK Radio". These artists include George Clinton ("All the Parties"), Sade Adu ("BBL Love [Interlude]"), and Snoop Dogg ("7969 Santa").

=== Songs ===
In the album's opening track, "Virginia Beach", a track which many assumed was a diss track towards Pusha T—which was later debunked, Drake raps on a warped sample of Frank Ocean's "Wiseman" about the ups and downs of a fallen relationship. The album's twenty-sixth cut, "The Shoe Fits" from For All the Dogs Scary Hours Edition, is more of an introspective track on the album. On the track, Drake confesses that he doesn't know how to rap like the "old Drake", which many fans long for. On the track, Drake takes a stand against domestic violence and toxic relationships, while also calling out the independent woman who primarily cater to men's needs.

== Artwork ==

The artwork for For All the Dogs was revealed in August 2023 on an Instagram post, with the album title and "Cover by Adonis" as its caption, meaning that it was drawn by Drake's son Adonis. It shows a white dog with evil red eyes standing straight in front of a black background, with a Parental Advisory label on the bottom-right corner. Adonis described his artwork as "a carefree piece of work". Drake called the work "an inspiration to his 2016 album Views". Drake dedicated the artwork to his 5th grade artwork which shows a cat with blue eyes.

On August 6, 2024, Drake released 100 gigabytes of data including behind-the-scenes clips, tour rehearsals, and studio footage, including three unheard tracks under an Instagram page named "plottttwistttttt". The data was also uploaded to a website (100gigs.org). Among the 100 gigabytes of data, several unused artworks were uncovered for previously released Drake albums, including Certified Lover Boy (2021), Honestly, Nevermind (2022), Her Loss (2022), and a scrapped sequel of Care Package (2019). The website also has an unseen promotional poster for Drake's It's All a Blur Tour. Among the unseen artwork and posters, two unused cover arts for For All the Dogs were uncovered.

== Critical reception ==
For All the Dogs ratings
Aggregate scores
Source	Rating
AnyDecentMusic?	4.7/10
Metacritic	53/100
Review scores
Source	Rating
AllMusic	2/5 stars
Clash	7/10
Evening Standard	2/5 stars
The Guardian	3/5 stars
The Independent	2/5 stars
The Line of Best Fit	6/10
NME	2/5 stars
Pitchfork	6.5/10
The Times	2/5 stars
Slant Magazine	2/5 stars

For All the Dogs Scary Hours Edition ratings
Review scores
Source	Rating
Clash	6/10
HipHopDX	2.7/5
The Independent	4/5 stars

For All the Dogs was met with mixed reviews. At Metacritic, which assigns a rating out of 100 to reviews from professional publications, the album received a weighted average score of 53, based on 13 reviews, indicating "mixed or average reviews". Aggregator AnyDecentMusic? gave it 4.7 out of 10, based on their assessment of the critical consensus.

Tim Sendra of AllMusic wrote that "Drake slides back into his usual M.O. of slow as taffy pull beats, alternately aggressive and morose rapping, and topics that range from how great Drake is to how rich Drake is to how misunderstood Drake is with the occasional bit of misogyny added in to put some rotten cherries on top". Shahzaib Hussain of Clash complimented the "smoky coos, chatter, static and dizzying detours" as the "production roves between sterilised studio sheen and an earthy fusion of soul samples and boom-bap drums" and remarked that while "this isn't his certified rap classic[,] it does signal a turning point". Writing for Evening Standard, Will Richards wrote that "the album drags its feet and loses its cohesion" and that the "parallels simply aren’t observable when listening".

Shaad D'Souza of The Guardian stated the album features some of Drake's most "invigorated songs in many years, and sees him going toe-to-toe with younger rappers (Yeat) and producers (Cash Cobain) who force him out of his comfort zone". Writing for The Independent, Nadine Smith found that "the childish pettiness and adolescent insecurities that were once endearing in their juvenilia now seem tired and immature. Instead of chilling out and settling down as he approaches his forties, [the album] sees him acting up more than ever, in ways that frequently reek not just of insecurity, but outright misogyny". The Line of Best Fit's Josh Herring wrote Drake flows between R&B and rap "without warning in an often clunky and unprepared delivery". He stated that "the focus [of the album] is unclear" and that the LP is "repetitive". NME's Luke Morgan Britton wrote that the album is "sadly, frustratingly and perhaps predictably" seeing Drake "succumb to many of the same worst habits that have marred his most recent records". Concluding his review, Britton noted that the LP "not only feels tiring, but sounds tired too". Pitchfork's Julianne Escobedo Shepherd wrote that Drake "has yet again doubled down over a melange of styles—drill, underworld R&B, Playboi Carti's flow—and other than a few flashes of brilliance, the music can't save him from himself", stating that "the meat of this bloated 23-track album are his own grievances and a dearth of topical contrast". Will Hodgkinson of The Times called Drake "a seriously good rapper" that "cannot stop himself from complaining all the time".

Slant Magazine's Paul Attard wrote that "For All the Dogs isn’t so much a thematically cohesive body of work" but is instead a "bloated collection of hardly thought-out ideas that amount to a one big pity party". He stated that the album is "immaculately produced and deploys a few fun bait-and-switch beats", however, the best parts of the album are under several filler cuts. Mosi Reeves of Rolling Stone felt that there is "evidence of a good album somewhere within the hour-and-a-half long bloat that is For All the Dogs" but summarized the album as "meandering".

In a review of For All the Dogs Scary Hours Edition, Shahzaib Hussain for Clash wrote that Drake "finds pockets within the grooves and crevices, foregoing lustre and grandiosity in favour of an understated performance piece". Concluding his review, Hussain stated that "Drake is Drake’s only competition". HipHopDX's Nadine Smith wrote that despite the Scary Hours edition intending to "serve as evidence of Drake’s lyrical prowess and unchallenged dominance of the rap game", it instead makes him look "desperate" and "uncomfortable". Roisin O'Connor of The Independent wrote that the "surprise release helps shake off the toxic sludge he waded through on For All the Dogs".

=== Year-end lists ===
Select year-end rankings of For All the Dogs
Critic/Publication	List	Rank	Ref.
Billboard	The 50 Best Albums of 2023	50	
Complex	The 50 Best Albums of 2023	22	
The New York Times	Jon Caramanica's Best Albums of 2023	12	
Rolling Stone	The 100 Best Albums of 2023	35	
Rolling Stone	The 10 Best Rap Albums of 2023	6	

== Commercial performance ==
In Drake's home country of Canada, For All the Dogs debuted at number one on the Billboard Canadian Albums, marking Drake's fourteenth number-one album in the country. The album also debuted at number one on the US Billboard 200 with 402,000 album-equivalent units, including 10,000 pure album sales. The album earned a total of 514.01 million on-demand streams in the debut week, that resulted in the largest streaming week of 2023 for any album and the fourth-largest ever. For All the Dogs is Drake's thirteenth number-one album in the US. All 23 tracks debuted on the Billboard Hot 100, with seven of them appearing in the top-ten. Drake also became the first artist to tally at least 300 Hot 100 entries. With For All the Dogs, Drake extended many of his Hot 100 chart records, including the most top-five hits (41), top-ten hits (76), top-20 entries (132), top 40 hits (199) and overall charted titles (320). In its second week, the album remained in the top ten in the US Billboard 200 and fell to number two, earning 164,000 album-equivalent units.

After the release of the deluxe edition, For All the Dogs: Scary Hours, the album returned to number one on the Billboard 200, with 145,000 album-equivalent units. For All the Dogs debuted at number two on the new Billboard Top Streaming Albums chart dated October 28. The following week, the album reached number one on the chart. As of December 27, 2023, For All the Dogs was the eighteenth best-selling album of the year according to Hits, moved a total 1,121,000 album-equivalent units, including 13,000 pure album sales, 53,000 song sales, 1.422 billion audio-on-demand streams, and 49 million video-on-demand streams. Still according to Hits, the álbum moved a total 1,371,000 album-equivalent units in 2024, was the eighteenth best-selling album of the year.

For All the Dogs also gave Drake his sixth number-one album in the United Kingdom and marked his second chart-topping album in less than a year, following his collaborative album with 21 Savage titled Her Loss (2022). In its second week, the album remained in the top 10 in the UK and fell to number three.

== Track listing ==
For All the Dogs track listing
No.	Title	Writer(s)	Producer(s)	Length
1.	"Virginia Beach"	Aubrey Graham; Harley Arsenault; Noah Shebib; Christopher Breaux; James Ho	Arsenault; 40^{[c]}	4:11
2.	"Amen" (featuring Teezo Touchdown)	Aubrey Graham; Aaron Thomas; Kai Wright; Ben Scholefield; Rudolph Stanfield	Sango; Budgie; Teezo Touchdown^{[a]}	2:21
3.	"Calling for You" (featuring 21 Savage)	Aubrey Graham; Shéyaa Abraham-Joseph; Miles McCollum; Shebib; Gentuar Memishi; Cashmere Small; José Rodriguez; Jeremiah Milfort; Francis LeBlanc; Nohelani Cypriano; Dennis Graue	Lil Yachty; 40; Gent!; Cash Cobain; PoWRTrav; JayStolaa	4:45
4.	"Fear of Heights"	Aubrey Graham; Ozan Yildirim; Darryl Clemons; Nik Frascona; Machado Joseph; Benjamin Saint Fort; Douglas Ford; Simon Gebrelul	Oz; Pooh Beatz; Nik D; XYNothing; Bnyx^{[a]}	2:35
5.	"Daylight"	Aubrey Graham; Joshua Luellen; Matthew-Kyle Brown; Thomas Cremeni; Alessio Bevilacqua; Adonis Graham	Southside; Smatt; T9C^{[c]}; Lil Esso^{[a]}	2:44
6.	"First Person Shooter" (featuring J. Cole)	Aubrey Graham; Jermaine Cole; Matthew Samuels; Anderson Hernandez; Brytavious Chambers; Michael Mule; Isaac De Boni; Yildirim; Scotty Coleman; Joe Washington, Jr.; Snorre Tidemand	Vinylz; Boi-1da; Tay Keith; FnZ; Oz; Coleman	4:07
7.	"IDGAF" (featuring Yeat)	Aubrey Graham; Noah Smith; Norma Winstone; John Taylor; Saint Fort; Sebastian Shah	Bnyx; Shah^{[a]}	4:20
8.	"7969 Santa"	Aubrey Graham; A. Thomas; Alex Lustig; Nyan Lieberthal; Saint Fort; Jahaan Sweet; Keith Cozart; Tavares Taylor; Tyree Pittman	Lustig; Nyan; Bnyx^{[a]}; Sweet^{[a]}	4:19
9.	"Slime You Out" (featuring SZA)	Aubrey Graham; Solána Rowe; Noel Cadastre; Shebib; Saint Fort; Dalton Tennant; Chris Powell; Grant Lapointe	Drake; Cadastre; 40^{[a]}; Bnyx^{[a]}; Tennant^{[a]}	5:10
10.	"Bahamas Promises"	Aubrey Graham; Sweet; Ray Nelson	Sweet; Quasi	3:04
11.	"Tried Our Best"	Aubrey Graham; Shebib; Sweet	40; Sweet	3:29
12.	"Screw the World" (interlude)	Nasir Jones; Jean-Claude Olivier; Samuel Barnes; Kurtis Walker; David Reeves; Jahlil Hutchins; Lawrence Smith; Norman Harris; Allan Felder; Aaron O'Bryant	DJ Screw	1:52
13.	"Drew a Picasso"	Aubrey Graham; Sampha Sisay; Shebib; Daniel Wagner; Phillip Campbell; Kamyar Karimi; Thomas Lumpkins; John Hyszko; Eli Brown	40; Dnny Phntm; Sauceboy; TheBoyKam; Tommy Parker; Young Troy; E. Brown	4:22
14.	"Members Only" (featuring PartyNextDoor)	Aubrey Graham; Jahron Brathwaite; Steven Vidal; Shebib	Stwo; 40^{[a]}	4:37
15.	"What Would Pluto Do"	Aubrey Graham; McCollum; Memishi; Bennett Pepple; Saint Fort	Lil Yachty; Gent!; Bangs; Bnyx^{[c]}	3:02
16.	"All the Parties" (featuring Chief Keef)	Aubrey Graham; Samuels; Saint Fort; Arsenault; Maneesh Bidaye; Coleman; Jai'el Blackmon; Fierce	Boi-1da; Bnyx; Arsenault; Maneesh; Coleman; Jdolla; Fierce	3:38
17.	"8AM in Charlotte"	Aubrey Graham; Denzel Williams; Mario Dragoi; Jason Woodland; Lauren Santi; Nichol Eskridge	Conductor Williams; Mario Luciano; Jason Wool^{[a]}	4:26
18.	"BBL Love" (interlude)	Aubrey Graham; A. Thomas; Kaushik Barua	Kid Masterpiece	2:41
19.	"Gently" (featuring Bad Bunny)	Aubrey Graham; Benito Martínez; Diamanté Blackmon; Yildirim; Frascona	Gordo; Oz; Nik D	2:13
20.	"Rich Baby Daddy" (featuring Sexyy Red and SZA)	Aubrey Graham; Janae Wherry; Rowe; Blackmon; Richard Zastenker; Johannes Klahr; Saint Fort; Ford; Shivam Barot; Yuval Chain; Florence Welch; Isabella Summers; Mac Felländer-Tsai; Thomas Schaeferdieck	Gordo; Liohn; Klahr; Bnyx^{[c]}; Dougie F^{[c]}; the Loud Pack^{[c]}; UV Killin Em^{[c]}	5:19
21.	"Another Late Night" (featuring Lil Yachty)	Aubrey Graham; McCollum; Deshawn Jackson	Lil Yachty; Childboy	2:50
22.	"Away from Home"	Aubrey Graham; McCollum; Saint Fort; Justin Raisen; Lukas Levine	Lil Yachty; Bnyx; Raisen; SadPony; Lukas	4:18
23.	"Polar Opposites"	Aubrey Graham; McCollum; Memishi; Anthoine Walters; Pepple; Omar Gomez; Shebib	Lil Yachty; Gent!; Walters; Bangs; Beatmenace; 40^{[a]}	4:17
Total length:				84:50

For All the Dogs Scary Hours Edition track listing
No.	Title	Writer(s)	Producer(s)	Length
1.	"Red Button"	Aubrey Graham; Silas Wilson; McCollum; Roberto Santos	Ovrkast; Lil Yachty^{[c]}	2:40
2.	"Stories About My Brother"	Aubrey Graham; Williams; Jimmy Quinn	Conductor Williams	4:24
3.	"The Shoe Fits"	Aubrey Graham; S. Wilson; McCollum; Hernandez; Julius Thomas	Ovrkast; Lil Yachty^{[c]}	6:14
4.	"Wick Man"	Aubrey Graham; Alan Maman; Koen De Bruyne	The Alchemist	3:01
5.	"Evil Ways" (featuring J. Cole)	Aubrey Graham; Cole; Samuels; Hernandez; Mulé; De Boni; Amir Sims; Charles Simmons, Jr.; David Bradshaw	Vinylz; Boi-1da; FnZ; Fierce	3:47
6.	"You Broke My Heart"	Aubrey Graham; Hernandez; Mulé; De Boni; Alexander Morand; Kenny Thomas; Frank Wilson	Vinylz; FnZ	3:50
Total length:				108:46

Notes

- ^{^[c]} signifies a co-producer
- ^{^[a]} signifies an additional producer

Sample credits

- "Virginia Beach" contains samples of "Wiseman", written by Christopher Breaux and James Ho, as performed by Frank Ocean.
- "Calling for You" contains samples of "Livin Without You", written by Nohelani Cypriano and Dennis Graue, as performed by Nohelani Cypriano; a sample of "Calling 4 You (Freestyle)", written by Francis Leblanc, as performed by Fridayy; and an uncredited sample of "Shake it to the Ground", written by Charles Smith and Ryeisha Berrain, as performed by Blaqstarr and Rye Rye.
- "Fear of Heights" contains an interpolation of "Can Your Pussy Do the Dog?", written by Poison Ivy Rorschach and Lux Interior, as performed by the Cramps.
- "Daylight" contains uncredited samples of dialogue from Scarface (1983), written by Oliver Stone, as performed by Al Pacino.
- "First Person Shooter" contains samples of "Look Me in the Eyes", written by Joe Washington Jr., as performed by Joe Washington and Wash; and "Redemption", as scored by Snorre Tidemand.
- "IDGAF" contains samples of "The Tunnel", written by Norma Winstone and John Taylor, as performed by Azimuth.
- "7969 Santa" contains samples of "I Don't Like", written by Keith Cozart, Tavares Taylor, and Tyree Pittman, as performed by Chief Keef and Lil Reese.
- "Screw the World" contains samples of "If I Ruled the World", written by Robert Earl Davis Jr., as performed by DJ Screw; which itself contains samples of "If I Ruled the World (Imagine That)", written by Nasir Jones, Kurtis Walker, Samuel Barnes, and Jean-Claude Olivier, as performed by Nas and Lauryn Hill.
- "Drew a Picasso" contains samples of "The Motion", written by Aubrey Graham, Noah Shebib, and Sampha Sisay, as performed by Drake.
- "All the Parties" contains an uncredited interpolation of "West End Girls", written by Neil Tennant and Chris Lowe, as performed by Pet Shop Boys.
- "8am in Charlotte" contains samples of "A Faithful Spirit", written by Nichol Eskridge of the Polyphonic Music Library.
- "Rich Baby Daddy" contains an interpolation of "Dog Days Are Over", written by Florence Welch and Isabella Summers, as performed by Florence and the Machine.
- "You Broke My Heart" contains samples of "Stoned Love", written by Frank Wilson and Kenny Thomas, as performed by the Supremes.

== Personnel ==
Credits adapted from Tidal.

=== Musicians ===
- Drake – vocals
- 40 – keyboards (tracks 1, 3, 9, 13, 14), drums (1, 3, 13, 14), bass (9)
- Harley Arsenault – drums, keyboards (1)
- Monique Avant – vocals (3)
- Baby M – additional vocals (3)
- JayStolaa – drums (3)
- PowrTrav – drums (3)
- Cash Cobain – drums (3)
- Gent! – drums (3, 15), keyboards (15)
- Adonis – additional vocals (5)
- Vinylz – drums, keyboards (6)
- FnZ – drums, keyboards (6)
- Coleman – drums, keyboards (6)
- Boi-1da – drums, keyboards (6)
- Tay Keith – drums, keyboards (6)
- Oz – keyboards (6)
- Teezo Touchdown – additional vocals (8), background vocals (18)
- Nyan Lieberthal – additional vocals, keyboards (8)
- Snoop Dogg – additional vocals (8)
- Alex Lustig – keyboards (8)
- Dalton Tennant – bass, keyboards (9)
- Noel Cadastre – bass, drums, keyboards (9)
- JeRonelle – additional vocals (10, 11, 23)
- Eli Brown – drums, keyboards (13)
- Sauceboy – drums (13)
- Young Troy – drums (13)
- Tommy Parker – drums (13)
- TheBoyKam – drums (13)
- Dnny Phntm – drums (13)
- Steven Vidal – drums, keyboards (14)
- Lil Yachty – background vocals (15)
- Bangs – drums, keyboards (15)
- Bnyx – drums, keyboards (15)
- Chief Keef – additional vocals (16)
- June Audrey Raisen – additional vocals (22)

=== Technical ===
- Chris Athens – mastering
- Dave Huffman – mastering (1–8, 10–23)
- Noel Cadastre – mixing (1–11, 13, 15–20, 22, 23), engineering (all tracks)
- Noah Shebib – mixing (1–3, 10–14, 17–22)
- Hector Castro – engineering (9)
- Oupsing – mixing assistance (1–8, 10–23)
- Jad El Khoury – engineering assistance (9)

== Charts ==
=== Weekly charts ===
Weekly chart performance for For All the Dogs
Chart (2023)	Peak position
Australian Albums (ARIA)	1
Australian Hip Hop/R&B Albums (ARIA)	1
Austrian Albums (Ö3 Austria)	2
Belgian Albums (Ultratop Flanders)	5
Belgian Albums (Ultratop Wallonia)	2
Canadian Albums (Billboard)	1
Danish Albums (Hitlisten)	1
Dutch Albums (Album Top 100)	1
Finnish Albums (Suomen virallinen lista)	6
French Albums (SNEP)	2
German Albums (Offizielle Top 100)	5
Hungarian Albums (MAHASZ)	3
Icelandic Albums (Tónlistinn)	2
Irish Albums (Official Charts)	1
Italian Albums (FIMI)	1
Lithuanian Albums (AGATA)	2
New Zealand Albums (RMNZ)	1
Nigerian Albums (TurnTable Top 50)	12
Norwegian Albums (VG-lista)	1
Polish Albums (ZPAV)	5
Spanish Albums (Promusicae)	15
Swedish Albums (Sverigetopplistan)	2
Swiss Albums (Schweizer Hitparade)	2
UK Albums (Official Charts)	1
UK R&B Albums (Official Charts)	3
US Billboard 200	1
US Top R&B/Hip-Hop Albums (Billboard)	1

=== Year-end charts ===
2023 year-end chart performance for For All the Dogs
Chart (2023)	Position
Australian Albums (ARIA)	96
Belgian Albums (Ultratop Flanders)	139
Danish Albums (Hitlisten)	95
Dutch Albums (Album Top 100)	68
French Albums (SNEP)	195
Hungarian Albums (MAHASZ)	75
Swiss Albums (Schweizer Hitparade)	23
UK Albums (OCC)	66
US Billboard 200	133
US Top R&B/Hip-Hop Albums (Billboard)	39

2024 year-end chart performance for For All the Dogs
Chart (2024)	Position
Australian Albums (ARIA)	84
Australian Hip Hop/R&B Albums (ARIA)	23
Belgian Albums (Ultratop Flanders)	166
Canadian Albums (Billboard)	6
New Zealand Albums (RMNZ)	32
UK Albums (OCC)	100
US Billboard 200	5
US Top R&B/Hip-Hop Albums (Billboard)	1

2025 year-end chart performance for For All the Dogs
Chart (2025)	Position
US Billboard 200	68
US Top R&B/Hip-Hop Albums (Billboard)	17

== Certifications ==
Certifications for For All the Dogs
Region	Certification	Certified units/sales
Canada (Music Canada)	2× Platinum	160,000^{‡}
Denmark (IFPI Danmark)	Platinum	20,000^{‡}
France (SNEP)	Gold	50,000^{‡}
Italy (FIMI)	Gold	25,000^{‡}
New Zealand (RMNZ)	2× Platinum	30,000^{‡}
Poland (ZPAV)	Gold	10,000^{‡}
Portugal (AFP)	Gold	3,500^{‡}
United Kingdom (BPI)	Gold	100,000^{‡}
United States (RIAA)	3× Platinum	3,000,000^{‡}
^{‡} Sales+streaming figures based on certification alone.

== Release history ==
Release dates and formats for For All the Dogs
Region	Date	Label(s)	Format(s)	Edition	Ref.
Various	October 6, 2023	OVO; Republic	Digital download; streaming	Standard	
Various	November 17, 2023	OVO; Republic	Digital download; streaming	Scary Hours	
