= 8AM in Charlotte =

2023 single by Drake

Single by Drake

from the album For All the Dogs
- Released: October 5, 2023
- Genre: Hip hop
- Length: 4:28
- Label: OVO Sound; Republic
- Songwriters: Aubrey Graham; Denzel Williams; Mario Dragoi; J. Woodland; L. Santi; Nichol Eskridge
- Producers: Conductor Williams; Mario Luciano

Drake singles chronology
"Slime You Out" (2023)	"8AM in Charlotte" (2023)	"Rich Baby Daddy" (2023)

Music video
- "8AM in Charlotte" on YouTube

"8AM in Charlotte" is a song by Canadian rapper Drake. It was released through OVO Sound and Republic Records as the second single from his eighth studio album, For All the Dogs, on October 5, 2023, one day before the album was released. Drake wrote the song with producers Conductor Williams and Mario Luciano and additional producer Jason Wool, alongside L. Santi and Nichol Eskridge, due to it sampling "A Faithful Spirit", written by the latter. The song is a continuance of Drake's "[timestamp] in [city]" series of tracks.

== Music video ==
The song was released alongside a music video beginning with a skit starring Adonis, Drake's son. In the skit, Adonis details how he created the For All the Dogs cover. He explains that the drawn goat on the cover represents his father, a reference to the "Greatest of All Time" acronym. In the video, Drake raps alongside his son and his team.

== Reception ==
"8AM in Charlotte" received generally positive reviews from music critics, who praised the track's sampling and Conductor Williams producing the song, as well as Drake's improved lyricism with lines such as "got hoes in my whip, i drive while they strip". Writing for Billboard, Carl Lamarre said that he sought to win back the trust of fans with "8AM in Charlotte". Alexander Cole of HotNewHipHop praised Drake's "focused" rapping and "incredible bars". He also praised the "nice piano passage" and chopped vocal samples on the beat. XXL writer C. Vernon Coleman II also praised the track's piano background and choir samples. Complex writer Trace William Cohen also praised the song's "deep" lyrics. Writing for Clash, Shahzaib Hussain stated that the track "sees [Drake] unleash pointed missives over soft chords and a looped chipmunk choir." He concluded his review of the song as he noted that, "["8AM in Charlotte" is] less about which rap rival he's throwing shots at, and more a personal dictum and a winding confessional about legacy: a reorienting of his priorities." Pitchfork's Dylan Green stated that the track "[represents] the stark tonal binary that's come to define Drake's music over the past decade." Writing for Rolling Stone, Mosi Reeves notes that the song is Drake's "latest entry in his time-stamped freestyles and perhaps his best display of orthodox rapping" on For All The Dogs. He notes that the song has a "muffled, dreamlike quality that recalls Drake's most spellbinding songs." Billboard's Kyle Denis ranked the track at number six out of the 23 songs on Drake's For All the Dogs. In his review, he noted that the track "is a worthy addition to Drake's timestamp songs collection that also honors Griselda's impact with soulful production." He finally stated that "with three meaty metaphor-packed verses that feature Drake standing staunchly in his rap bag, this, in many ways, is the proper return to 'old Drake' that he promised so many months ago."

== Charts ==
Chart performance for "8AM in Charlotte"
Chart (2023)	Peak position
Australia (ARIA)	60
Australia Hip Hop/R&B (ARIA)	22
Canada Hot 100 (Billboard)	13
France (SNEP)	149
Global 200 (Billboard)	21
Greece International (IFPI)	17
Lithuania (AGATA)	65
New Zealand (Recorded Music NZ)	30
Portugal (AFP)	57
South Africa (Billboard)	13
Sweden Heatseeker (Sverigetopplistan)	13
UK Streaming (OCC)	28
US Billboard Hot 100	17
US Hot R&B/Hip-Hop Songs (Billboard)	13
