= Virginia Beach (song) =

2023 song by Drake

Song by Drake

from the album For All the Dogs
- Released: October 6, 2023
- Length: 4:11
- Label: OVO; Republic
- Songwriters: Aubrey Graham; Harley Arsenault; Noah Shebib; Christopher Breaux; James Ho
- Producers: Arsenault; 40 (co.)

"Virginia Beach" is a song by Canadian rapper Drake, released on October 6, 2023, as the opening track from his eighth studio album For All the Dogs (2023). Produced by Harley Arsenault, with co-production from 40, it contains samples of the unreleased song "Wiseman" by Frank Ocean.

== Background ==
On October 5, 2023, Drake released the tracklist of For All the Dogs. "Virginia Beach" was widely speculated to be a diss track aimed at his rival Pusha T, as it was named after his hometown, but this was disproved after the song was released.

== Composition ==
Over the sample, the song finds Drake reflecting on a relationship with a woman as if talking to her. He accuses her of "drawin' conclusions like you got a Parsons degree or somethin'", which is a diss toward Barbadian singer Rihanna, who has an honorary degree from the Parsons School of Design and was in an on-again, off-again relationship with Drake from 2009 to 2016. In the first verse, Drake compares the woman in question to the titular city for the reason that she is "pretty but rough".

As for the musical style, Nadine Smith of The Independent commented the song "brings to mind the cloudy textures and hazy samples of his early work."

== Critical reception ==
Billboard's Kyle Denis ranked the track as the fourteenth best track on the album. Denis wrote that the track is "bogged down by a clunky chorus and more corny bars". In a review of For All the Dogs, Louis Pavlakos of HipHopDX wrote, "Even opener 'Virginia Beach' sounds refreshed thanks to a lively flip of Frank Ocean's 'Wiseman' and a memorable chorus." Luke Morgan Britton of NME stated the song "brims with stream-of-conscious bars". Paul Attard of Slant Magazine criticized the song in regard to a particular line, writing "'Asked me if I coulda treated you better, but no,' he asks himself on the album's sweeping opener 'Virginia Beach,' and he rushes to that answer before he can even seriously consider the quandary before him. Thinking twice is reserved solely for wimps, apparently."

== Charts ==
=== Weekly charts ===
Weekly chart performance for "Virginia Beach"
Chart (2023)	Peak position
Australia (ARIA)	9
Australia Hip Hop/R&B (ARIA)	4
Austria (Ö3 Austria Top 40)	42
Canada Hot 100 (Billboard)	3
Denmark (Tracklisten)	21
France (SNEP)	36
Global 200 (Billboard)	4
Greece International (IFPI)	7
Iceland (Tónlistinn)	7
Ireland (IRMA)	10
Italy (FIMI)	48
Latvia (LaIPA)	11
Lithuania (AGATA)	25
Luxembourg (Billboard)	8
MENA (IFPI)	20
Netherlands (Single Top 100)	34
New Zealand (Recorded Music NZ)	7
Norway (VG-lista)	20
Portugal (AFP)	12
South Africa Streaming (TOSAC)	4
Sweden (Sverigetopplistan)	41
Switzerland (Schweizer Hitparade)	11
UAE (IFPI)	7
UK Singles (Official Charts)	6
UK Hip Hop/R&B (Official Charts)	5
US Billboard Hot 100	3
US Hot R&B/Hip-Hop Songs (Billboard)	3

=== Year-end charts ===
2024 year-end chart performance for "Virginia Beach"
Chart (2024)	Position
US Hot R&B/Hip-Hop Songs (Billboard)	50

== Certifications ==
Certifications for "Virginia Beach"
Region	Certification	Certified units/sales
New Zealand (RMNZ)	Gold	15,000^{‡}
United Kingdom (BPI)	Silver	200,000^{‡}
United States (RIAA)	2× Platinum	2,000,000^{‡}
^{‡} Sales+streaming figures based on certification alone.
