= Rich Baby Daddy =

Single by Drake featuring Sexyy Red and SZA

from the album For All the Dogs
- Released: October 13, 2023
- Recorded: December 2022
- Genre: Miami bass
- Length: 5:19
- Label: OVO; Republic
- Songwriters: Aubrey Graham; Janae Wherry; Solána Rowe; Diamanté Blackmon; Richard Zastenker; Johannes Klahr; Benjamin Saint Fort; Douglas Ford; Shivam Barot; Yuval Chain; Florence Welch; Isabella Summers; T. Schaeferdieck
- Producers: Diamanté Blackmon; Liohn; Klahr; Uv Killin Em; The Loud Pack

Drake singles chronology
"8AM in Charlotte" (2023)	"Rich Baby Daddy" (2023)	"First Person Shooter" (2023)

Sexyy Red singles chronology
"Shake Yo Dreads" (2023)	"Rich Baby Daddy" (2023)	"Hoe Shit" (remix) (2023)

SZA singles chronology
"Slime You Out" (2023)	"Rich Baby Daddy" (2023)	"Saturn" (2024)

Music video
- "Rich Baby Daddy" Video on YouTube

"Rich Baby Daddy" is a song by Canadian rapper Drake featuring American rapper Sexyy Red and American singer-songwriter SZA. It was sent to Italian contemporary hit radio through OVO Sound and Republic Records as the third single from Drake's eighth studio album, For All the Dogs, on October 13, 2023. The three artists wrote the song with producers Gordo, Liohn, and Klahr, and co-producers Bnyx, Dougie F, the Loud Pack, and UV Killin Em, alongside Florence Welch, Isabella Summers, and T. Schaeferdieck, due to the song interpolating "Dog Days Are Over" by Florence + the Machine. While the song marks the first time that Sexyy Red has collaborated with both Drake and SZA, the latter two previously collaborated on "Slime You Out", which served as the lead single from For All the Dogs.

== Critical reception ==
Writing for Rolling Stone, Mosi Reeves compared Drake matching his vocal performance to that of Sexyy Red on "Rich Baby Daddy" to him matching that of City Girls on his 2018 single, "In My Feelings" and praised the sample of "Dog Days Are Over" by Florence + the Machine. Pitchfork's Dylan Green found Sexyy Red and SZA to be "two of the most memorable features" on For All the Dogs and felt that their "raucous" parts on the song "live up to the song’s hectic, club-ready beat". Kyle Denis of Billboard saw the song as "with infectious production that heavily nods to Miami bass, this is the song of the summer that we deserved — from Sexyy's 'Looking for the Hoes' interpolation to an outro from Drake that basically cements him as the ultimate rich baby daddy" and saw it to be the potential "Song of the Fall". Chris Richards at The Washington Post criticized the "stray" line "Take care of the dog until the dog days are over" that Drake rapped and called it an "inelegant hint at potentially forthcoming Drake redemption album".

== Music video ==
An official music video was filmed during New Year's Eve, as well as February 4, 2024, which is when Sexyy Red gave birth unexpectedly during filming. The video was later officially released on February 14, 2024. It was directed by Drake himself. The video documents the actual birth of Sexyy Red's second child, including her transportation to the hospital after her water broke, as well as audio of her pushing the baby out. The video ends with Sexyy Red dancing in the hospital along with several other girls while holding her newly born child, who later gets held by SZA in another scene.

== Live performances ==
SZA performed "Rich Baby Daddy" during the Grand National Tour (2025), which she co-headlined with rapper Kendrick Lamar. Prior to the tour, he and Drake were engaged in a highly publicized feud; its inclusion led Joe Lynch of Billboard to speculate on why it was performed: "Trolling? Tribute? Olive branch? Olive the above?"

== Charts ==
=== Weekly charts ===
Weekly chart performance for "Rich Baby Daddy"
Chart (2023–2024)	Peak position
Australia (ARIA)	11
Australia Hip Hop/R&B (ARIA)	2
Canada Hot 100 (Billboard)	18
Canada CHR/Top 40 (Billboard)	28
France (SNEP)	152
Germany (GfK)	68
Global 200 (Billboard)	16
Greece International (IFPI)	30
Iceland (Tónlistinn)	22
Ireland (IRMA)	20
Lithuania (AGATA)	45
Netherlands (Single Top 100)	72
New Zealand (Recorded Music NZ)	9
Portugal (AFP)	72
Slovakia Singles Digital (ČNS IFPI)	95
Sweden Heatseeker (Sverigetopplistan)	1
Switzerland (Schweizer Hitparade)	81
UK Singles (Official Charts)	10
UK Hip Hop/R&B (Official Charts)	3
US Billboard Hot 100	11
US Hot R&B/Hip-Hop Songs (Billboard)	4
US Pop Airplay (Billboard)	37
US R&B/Hip-Hop Airplay (Billboard)	6
US Rhythmic Airplay (Billboard)	1

=== Year-end charts ===
Year-end chart performance for "Rich Baby Daddy"
Chart (2024)	Position
Australia Hip Hop/R&B (ARIA)	21
Canada (Canadian Hot 100)	67
Global 200 (Billboard)	141
US Billboard Hot 100	45
US Hot R&B/Hip-Hop Songs (Billboard)	16
US Rhythmic (Billboard)	14

== Certifications ==
Certifications for "Rich Baby Daddy"
Region	Certification	Certified units/sales
Australia (ARIA)	Platinum	70,000^{‡}
Canada (Music Canada)	2× Platinum	160,000^{‡}
Denmark (IFPI Danmark)	Gold	45,000^{‡}
France (SNEP)	Gold	100,000^{‡}
New Zealand (RMNZ)	2× Platinum	60,000^{‡}
Poland (ZPAV)	Gold	25,000^{‡}
United Kingdom (BPI)	Platinum	600,000^{‡}
United States (RIAA)	3× Platinum	3,000,000^{‡}
^{‡} Sales+streaming figures based on certification alone.

== Release history ==
Release dates and formats for "Rich Baby Daddy"
Region	Date	Format(s)	Label(s)	Ref.
Italy	October 13, 2023	Radio airplay	Island	
United States	October 17, 2023	Rhythmic contemporary radio	OVO; Republic	
