= Plain White T's (album) =

Studio album by Plain White T's
- Released: November 17, 2023
- Recorded: 2022
- Length: 40:05
- Label: Fearless
- Producers: Dan Geraghty; Tom Higgenson; Robbie Hiser; Jondren Hwang; Zach Jones; Johan Lenox; Lil Aaron; Raziel Leizar; Dan Monahan; Eric Palmquist; Ian Walsh

Plain White T's chronology
Parallel Universe (2018)	Plain White T's (2023)

Singles from Plain White T's
- 1. "Would You Even"; 2. "Spaghetti Tattoo" Released: February 13, 2023; 3. "Happy" Released: May 24, 2023; 4. "Red Flags"

Plain White T's is the ninth studio album by American rock band Plain White T's. It was released on November 17, 2023, through Fearless Records.

== Background ==
The album was announced in September 2023.

== Release and promotion ==
The album was released on November 17, 2023, by Fearless Records. The band will promote the album on 19-city North American headlining tour from January 23–February 18, 2024.

== Critical reception ==
Professional ratings
Review scores
Source	Rating
Blabbermouth	7.5/10
Distorted Sound Magazine	6/10
Kerrang!	3/5

James Hickie of Kerrang! magazine gave the album 3 out of 5 stars and said, "It's the sound of a band returning to the sound that made them famous, with all the overly earnest hallmarks in place, but little else to reflect what its creators have learned, musically and emotionally, in the intervening years since they broke big. It's something of a return to form then, a little on the regressive side too." Distorted Sound's Katie Bird has mixed reviews of the album saying, "Whilst there are songs that are staples of what they've always done, such as the sing-along chorus of Would You Even or the acoustic love song You Plus Me, the band also try new things." like with Fire Up. Then there were some "pitfalls" during the middle of album but the album's pacing picks back up starting with Happy. Lastly she writes, "Overall, this a flawed but enjoyable album," Anne Erickson of Blabbermouth.net wrote, "The strongest aspect of this new PLAIN WHITE T's album is the band's continued strength in songwriting and ability to relate to the listener. The lyrics of these songs really tell a story, often of love or, on the contrary, heartbreak, which is always a relatable theme. For those who appreciate a good story, this new album is a winner."

== Track listing ==
Plain White T's track listing
No.	Title	Writer(s)	Producer(s)	Length
1.	"Young Tonight"	Tom Higgenson	Higgenson; Dan Monahan	3:03
2.	"Would You Even"	Higgenson; Robbie Hiser	Hiser	2:49
3.	"You Plus Me"	Higgenson; Lil Aaron; Raziel Leizer	Lil Aaron; Leizer	3:12
4.	"Fired Up"	Higgenson; Ronald Ish; Zach Jones	Jones	2:49
5.	"A Little Less Alone"	Higgenson	Eric Palmquist	2:45
6.	"L-O-V-E"	Higgenson; Ish; Jones	Jones	2:45
7.	"Someone's Out There Waiting for You"	Higgenson	Higgenson; Monahan	3:28
8.	"Girl From Pasadena"	Higgenson; Lil Aaron; Ivy Adara	Higgenson; Lil Aaron; Monahan; Dan Geraghty; Johan Lenox	3:18
9.	"Happy"	Higgenson; Ish; Jones	Jones	2:42
10.	"Red Flags"	Higgenson; Jondren Hwang; Dev Lemons	Hwang	3:39
11.	"Love Keeps Growing"	Higgenson	Jones	3:25
12.	"Feeling (More Like) Myself"	Higgenson; Monahan	Higgenson; Monahan	2:52
13.	"Spaghetti Tattoo"	Higgenson; Monahan; Ian Walsh	Higgenson; Monahan; Walsh	3:12
Total length:				40:05

== Personnel ==
Vocals

- Tom Higgenson – lead vocals
- Plain White T's – primary artist

Production

- Kyle Black – drum engineer, engineer
- Delbert Bowers – mixing
- Austin Ciezszko – photography
- Dan Geraghty – producer
- De'Mar Hamilton – drum engineer
- Tom Higgenson – engineer, producer
- Robbie Hiser – engineer, producer
- Jondren Hwang – engineer, producer
- Zach Jones – engineer, mixing, producer
- Jeremy Klein – mixing
- Jordan Kulp – drum engineer
- Johan Lenox – producer
- Raziel Leizar – engineer, mixing, producer
- Lil Aaron – producer
- Jon Lunden – drum engineer
- Emerson Mancini – mastering
- Dan Monahan – engineer, producer
- Eric Palmquist – engineer, mixing, producer
- Tony Rogers – engineer
- Blake Roses – drum engineer
- Adam Schoeller – assistant engineer, mixing
- Daniel Topete — photography
- Mike Tucci – mastering
- Darren Vorel – art direction, design, photography
- Ian Walsh – engineer, producer
