= First Person Shooter (song) =

Single by Drake featuring J. Cole

from the album For All the Dogs
- Released: October 24, 2023
- Recorded: October 5, 2023
- Genre: Hip hop; trap
- Length: 4:07
- Label: OVO; Republic
- Songwriters: Aubrey Graham; Jermaine Cole; Matthew Samuels; Anderson Hernandez; Brytavious Chambers; Michael Mulé; Isaac De Boni; Ozan Yıldırım; Scotty Coleman; Snorre Tidemand
- Producers: Boi-1da; Vinylz; Tay Keith; FnZ; Oz; Coleman

Drake singles chronology
"Rich Baby Daddy" (2023)	"First Person Shooter" (2023)	"You Broke My Heart" (2023)

J. Cole singles chronology
"The Secret Recipe" (2023)	"First Person Shooter" (2023)	"H.Y.B." (2024)

Music video
- "First Person Shooter" on YouTube

"First Person Shooter" is a song by Canadian rapper Drake featuring American rapper J. Cole. It was released through OVO Sound and Republic Records on Drake's eighth studio album, For All the Dogs. Drake and Cole wrote the song with producers Boi-1da, Vinylz, Tay Keith, FnZ (Michael Mulé and Isaac De Boni), Oz, and Coleman, alongside Snorre Tidemand. It is notable for reigniting Drake's decade-long feud with fellow rapper Kendrick Lamar.

"First Person Shooter" debuted at number one on the US Billboard Hot 100, becoming Drake's thirteenth and Cole's first number-one song. It later impacted US rhythmic radio on October 24, 2023, as the album's fourth single. Its music video was released on November 15, 2023.

== Background ==
During a Table for One special episode on October 6, 2023, a few hours before For All the Dogs was released, Drake confirmed that J. Cole would appear on the sixth track of the album, calling it "fourth quarter magic", and also revealed that he and Cole had "just got out from the studio", making it the final song to be recorded for the album.

== Composition ==
"First Person Shooter" features a "subtle-yet-triumphant" yet "high-octane" production that starts out with a "warped" vocal sample of Joe Washington's "Look Me in the Eyes" while both artists exchange a few bars. The second half of the song features a down-pitched looped sample from Snorre Tidemand's orchestral "Redemption." The "hard" and "playful" track was especially noted for its "futuristic and energetic" production that enabled Drake and Cole to showcase their skills. The track sees Cole reflecting on his continuous success, arguing that him, Drake, and fellow American rapper Kendrick Lamar are the "big three" in rap music whereas he himself feels like Muhammad Ali. Another reference includes a comparison of both artists to a meme of two Spider-Men pointing at each other. Cole also says that he wishes to collaborate with fellow American rapper YoungBoy Never Broke Again later on the song, seemingly dismissing rumors of him dissing the rapper on his collaboration with rapper and album producer Lil Yachty on "The Secret Recipe", while he also confirms that his upcoming album, The Fall Off, is on the way. In reference to his fame and commercial success, Drake later shouts out Michael Jackson, notably referencing how he was one song away from eventually tying the latter's record for most number-one US Billboard Hot 100 singles by a solo male artist.

=== Response from Kendrick Lamar ===
After hearing of J. Cole's "big three" lyrical claim, rapper Kendrick Lamar appeared on Future and Metro Boomin's single, "Like That", which was released in late-March 2024. On his verse, he responds to Cole and Drake, rapping "Motherfuck the big three, nigga, it's just big me."

== Critical reception ==
In a first assessment of the album, Kyle Denis of Billboard ranked "First Person Shooter" as the ninth best track of the album, writing that the duo had adopted an "elder statesmen" mentality while still presenting their "skin in the game", but while their attitude was seen as "braggadocious", both were holding back a little. Rolling Stone's Mosi Reeves stated that on the song, Drake is "thoroughly outclassed by J Cole" and that his lyrics are basic, several of them being "desultory lyrics where he discusses women like he’s stocking a meat freezer." Writing for Clash, Shahzaib Hussain notes that "First Person Shooter" sees Drake "all shit-talking pomp and posturing."

== Commercial performance ==
The song debuted at number one on the US Billboard Hot 100, becoming Drake's thirteenth and Cole's first number-one song on the chart, the former tying the record for most solo number-one songs by a solo male artist with Michael Jackson. In its second week, the song remained in the top ten in the US Billboard Hot 100 and fell to number eight. The song debuted at number-one on the Billboard's Streaming Songs, marking Drake's 19th number-one on the chart.

== Charts ==
=== Weekly charts ===
Weekly chart performance
Chart (2023–2024)	Peak position
Australia (ARIA)	4
Australia Hip Hop/R&B (ARIA)	2
Austria (Ö3 Austria Top 40)	38
Canada Hot 100 (Billboard)	2
Denmark (Tracklisten)	22
France (SNEP)	52
Global 200 (Billboard)	2
Greece International (IFPI)	5
Iceland (Tónlistinn)	8
Ireland (IRMA)	7
Italy (FIMI)	55
Latvia (LaIPA)	8
Lithuania (AGATA)	19
Luxembourg (Billboard)	11
MENA (IFPI)	10
Netherlands (Single Top 100)	22
New Zealand (Recorded Music NZ)	5
Portugal (AFP)	15
South Africa Streaming (TOSAC)	2
Sweden (Sverigetopplistan)	42
Switzerland (Schweizer Hitparade)	10
UAE (IFPI)	4
UK Singles (OCC)	4
UK Hip Hop/R&B (OCC)	2
US Billboard Hot 100	1
US Hot R&B/Hip-Hop Songs (Billboard)	1
US Rhythmic Airplay (Billboard)	4

=== Year-end charts ===
Year-end chart performance
Chart (2024)	Position
Canada (Canadian Hot 100)	75
Global 200 (Billboard)	193
US Billboard Hot 100	61
US Hot R&B/Hip-Hop Songs (Billboard)	19
US Rhythmic (Billboard)	17

== Certifications ==
Certifications
Region	Certification	Certified units/sales
Australia (ARIA)	Gold	35,000^{‡}
Brazil (Pro-Música Brasil)	Platinum	40,000^{‡}
New Zealand (RMNZ)	Gold	15,000^{‡}
United Kingdom (BPI)	Silver	200,000^{‡}
^{‡} Sales+streaming figures based on certification alone.

== Release history ==
Release dates and formats
Region	Date	Format(s)	Label(s)	Ref.
United States	October 24, 2023	Rhythmic contemporary radio	OVO; Republic	
