= 2026 in American music =

The following is a list of events and releases that have happened or are expected to happen in 2026 in music in the United States.

== Notable events ==
=== January ===
- 9 – The Protomen released their first studio album in nearly seventeen years, Act III: This City Made Us, which served as the conclusion to their three-act rock opera inspired by the story of the Mega Man video game franchise.
- 16 – ASAP Rocky released his first studio album in eight years, Don't Be Dumb, over three years after its original announcement in December 2022.
  - Nicholas Galanin released his first album in five years, Stand on My Shoulders.
- 19 – Jamal Roberts performed the national anthem at the 2026 College Football Playoff National Championship.
- 23 – Megadeth released their self-titled final album, their first in four years.
  - Lina released her first album in over ten years, Melodrama.
  - Goldfinger released their first studio album in nearly six years, Nine Lives.
  - The Format released their first album in nearly twenty years, Boycott Heaven. It is also vocalist Nate Ruess' first album credited as a primary member in eleven years.
  - Alec Duckart, under his alias Searows, released his first studio album in four years, Death in the Business of Whaling.
- 30 – Joyce Manor released their first album in nearly four years, I Used to Go to This Bar.
  - By Storm, formed from surviving members of Injury Reserve, released their debut studio album, My Ghosts Go Ghost. It is the first album in nearly five years for members RiTchie with a T and Parker Corey.

=== February ===
- 1 – The 68th Annual Grammy Awards were held at the Crypto.com Arena in Los Angeles. Kendrick Lamar won the most awards with five including Record of the Year, shared with SZA for "Luther". Bad Bunny won Album of the Year for Debí Tirar Más Fotos, Billie Eilish and Finneas O'Connell won their third Song of the Year award for "Wildflower" and English singer-songwriter Olivia Dean won Best New Artist. This was the last year the ceremony aired on CBS, as ABC will air it under a ten-year deal starting in 2027.
- 5 – Twisted Sister canceled their 50th Anniversary tour after lead singer Dee Snider resigned due to health issues.
- 6 – Puscifer released their first studio album in nearly six years, Normal Isn't.
  - J. Cole released his first studio album in five years, The Fall-Off.
  - Silversun Pickups released their first studio album in four years, Tenterhooks.
  - Robert Deeble released his first album in eight years, The Space Between Us.
- 7 – 3 Doors Down frontman Brad Arnold died in his sleep from stage 4 renal cell carcinoma at the age of 47.
- 8 – Charlie Puth performed the national anthem and Bad Bunny, Lady Gaga, and Ricky Martin performed the halftime show during Super Bowl LX at the Levi's Stadium in Santa Clara, California. Green Day performed pre-game.
- 13 – Converge released their first studio album in nearly five years, Love Is Not Enough. It was followed by their next album, Hum of Hurt, only four months later.
  - The Bronx, under their moniker Mariachi El Bronx, released their first studio album in five years, Mariachi El Bronx IV.
  - The Lone Bellow released their first studio album in nearly four years, What a Time to Be Alive.
- 20 – New Found Glory released their first studio album in nearly six years, Listen Up!. It was their final album to feature guitarist Chad Gilbert before his death in September 2026.
  - Hilary Duff released her first studio album in eleven years, Luck... or Something.
  - Exhumed released their first studio album in four years, Red Asphalt.
- 27 – Neil Sedaka died at the age of 86.
  - Bruno Mars released his first solo studio album in nearly ten years and his first overall in nearly five years, The Romantic.
  - Rob Zombie released his first studio album in five years, The Great Satan.
  - Bill Callahan released his first studio album in four years, My Days of 58.
  - Ritt Momney released his first studio album in five years, Base.
  - A Wilhelm Scream released their first studio album in four years, Cheap Heat.
  - Voxtrot released their first studio album in nineteen years, Dreamers in Exile.

=== March ===
- 6 – Surfbort released their first studio album in five years, Reality Star.
  - Vial released their first studio album in five years, Hellhound.
- 13 – Lamb of God released their first studio album in four years, Into Oblivion.
  - The Fray released their first studio album in twelve years, A Light That Waits. This is their first album without original lead singer Isaac Slade who left the band in 2022.
  - Sweet Pill released their first studio album in four years, Still There's a Glow.
- 20 – Exodus released their first studio album in five years, Goliath. It is the band's first album in sixteen years to feature returning vocalist Rob Dukes, following Steve Souza's second departure in 2025.
  - Neurosis released their first studio album in ten years, An Undying Love for a Burning World. It is the band's first album to feature vocalist/guitarist Aaron Turner, following former frontman Scott Kelly's firing in 2019 and subsequent retirement in 2022, their first since drummer Jason Roeder's touring retirement in 2025 and their first in thirty years to not be produced by Steve Albini following his death in 2024.
  - Tyketto released their first album in ten years, Closer to the Sun.
  - Gladie released their first studio album in four years, No Need to Be Lonely.
  - Poison the Well released their first studio album in seventeen years, Peace in Place.
- 27 – Black Label Society released their first studio album in five years, Engines of Demolition.
  - Red Hot Chili Peppers bassist Flea released his debut solo studio album, Honora.
  - The Academy Is... released their first studio album in nearly eighteen years, Almost There.
  - Melissa Etheridge released her first studio album in five years, Rise.
  - Good Riddance released their first studio album in seven years, Before the World Caves In.
  - Snail Mail released her first studio album in nearly five years, Ricochet.
  - Paula Kelley released her first solo studio album in twenty-three years, Blinking as the Starlight Burns Out.
  - Tigers Jaw released their first studio album in five years, Lost on You.

=== April ===
- 3 – Corrosion of Conformity released their first studio album in eight years, Good God / Baad Man. It is their first album in more than three decades without original bassist Mike Dean, who was replaced by Bobby Landgraf, and their first in more than two decades with drummer Stanton Moore, who replaced Reed Mullin after his death in 2020.
  - Sunn O))) released their self-titled studio album, their first in seven years.
- 11 – No Doubt guitarist Tom Dumont announced that he had been diagnosed with early-onset Parkinson's disease but confirmed he would continue to perform.
- 12 – Australian actress Ruby Rose alleged in a Threads post that Katy Perry sexually assaulted her at Spice Market Nightclub in Melbourne, Australia in 2010. A representative for Perry responded with a statement to Variety that stated the allegations between Rose and Perry were both false and lies, and also stated that Rose "has a well-documented history of making serious public allegations on social media against various individuals, claims that have repeatedly been denied by those named." The Victoria Police began investigating the allegations.
- 14 – Alexia Jayy won the twenty-ninth season of The Voice. Liv Ciara was named runner-up.
- 17 – Vanessa Carlton released her first studio album in six years, Veils.
  - Nine Inch Noize, consisting of Nine Inch Nails and German electronic producer and DJ Boys Noize, released their collaborative self-titled studio album. It is Nine Inch Nails' first album not related to members Trent Reznor and Atticus Ross' film score work in six years.
  - Crimson Glory released their first studio album in twenty-seven years, Chasing the Hydra.
- 21 – Azealia Banks released her first studio album in twelve years, Zenzealia.
- 24 – Akon released his first studio album in seven years, Beautiful Day.
  - Failure released their first studio album in nearly five years, Location Lost.
  - Noah Kahan released his first studio album in almost four years, The Great Divide.
  - Terror released their first studio album in four years, Still Suffer.

=== May ===
- 1 – Isaiah Rashad released his first studio album in five years, It's Been Awful.
  - American Football released their fourth self-titled studio album, their first in seven years.
  - Toadies released their first studio album in nine years, The Charmer.
  - Rita Wilson released her first studio album in four years and her first of original material in seven years, Sound of a Woman.
  - Young the Giant released their first studio album in four years, Victory Garden.
- 8 – Amy Grant released her first solo studio album in almost ten years, The Me That Remains.
  - Muna released their first studio album in four years, Dancing on the Wall.
  - Linda Perry released her first solo studio album in eleven years, Let It Die Here.
  - Social Distortion released their first studio album in fifteen years, Born to Kill.
- 11 – Hannah Harper won the twenty-fourth season of American Idol. Jordan McCullough was named runner-up.
- 15 – The All-American Rejects released their first studio album in fourteen years, Sandbox.
  - Mya released her first studio album in eight years, Retrospect.
  - Kevin Morby released his first studio album in four years, Little Wide Open.
  - Pro-Pain released their first studio album in eleven years, Stone Cold Anger.
- 17 – The 61st Academy of Country Music Awards took place at MGM Grand Garden Arena in Paradise, Nevada.
- 22 – Armored Saint released their first studio album in six years, Emotion Factory Reset.
  - Lowertown released their first studio album in four years, Ugly Duckling Union.
  - Rapper Rob Base died from cancer at the age of 59.
- 25 – The American Music Awards of 2026 took place at the MGM Grand Garden Arena in Paradise, Nevada.
- 29 – Kurt Vile released his first studio album in four years, Philadelphia's Been Good to Me.
  - Shinedown released their first studio album in four years, Eight.
  - Sparta released their first studio album in four years, Cut a Silhouette.

=== June ===
- 2 – Peabo Bryson died from a stroke at age 75.
- 5 – Bedouine released her first studio album in five years, Neon Summer Skin.
  - Death Cab for Cutie released their first studio album in four years, I Built You a Tower.
  - Evanescence released their first studio album in five years, Sanctuary.
  - Lizzo released her first studio album in four years, Bitch.
  - Barry Manilow released his first studio album in six years, What a Time.
  - Jo Dee Messina released her first studio album in twelve years, Bridges.
  - Modest Mouse released their first studio album in five years, An Eraser and a Maze. It is their first album to feature guitarist Simon O'Connor following the departures of Jim Fairchild and Lisa Molinaro in 2021, and their first with drummer Damon Cox following the death of Jeremiah Green in 2022.
  - Widowspeak released their first studio album in four years, Roses.
- 12 – Baauer released his first studio album in six years, U.
  - Dirty Heads released their first studio album in four years, 7 Seas.
  - Khemmis released their self-titled studio album, their first in five years.
  - Kelsey Lu released her first studio album in seven years, So Help Me God.
  - Sleeping with Sirens released their first studio album in four years, An Ending in Itself.
  - Sublime released their first studio album in thirty years, Until the Sun Explodes. It is their first album released since the death of original frontman Bradley Nowell in 1996, with his son, Jakob, providing lead vocals for this album.
  - Genghis Tron released their first studio album in five years, Signal Fire.
- 14 – Singer Oliver Tree was killed in a mid-air helicopter collision in Rio de Janeiro, Brazil, along with five other individuals while Tree was embarking on a world tour at age 32.
- 17 – Woodwind musician and Chicago founding member Walter Parazaider died from Alzheimer's disease at the age of 81.
- 18 – Sixpence None the Richer bassist Justin Cary died from a stroke at age 50.
- 19 – D12 released their first studio album in twenty-two years, D12 Forever (Vol. 1). It is the group's first album since the murder of member Proof in 2006, and the departures of former members Eminem and Mr. Porter in 2018, being Porter's second departure, and features a posthumous appearance from Proof.
  - YG released his first solo studio album in four years, The Gentlemen's Club.
- 22 – Music executive and record producer Clive Davis died at age 94.
- 26 – Butthole Surfers released their first studio album in twenty-five years, After the Astronaut. Originally intended to be released in 1998 as the successor to 1996's Electriclarryland, the album was initially canceled due to record label politics.
  - Downtown Boys released their first studio album in nine years, Public Luxury.
  - Junius released their first studio album in nine years, Sotera.
  - The Pretty Reckless released their first studio album in five years, Dear God.
  - Some Velvet Sidewalk released their first studio album in twenty-nine years, Critters Encore.
  - Switchfoot released their first studio album in five years, Forever Now.
  - T.I. released his final studio album, Kill the King, his first in six years.
- 30 – Victor Willis, the cop/admiral and founding member of the Village People, died at the age of 74.

=== July ===
- 3 – Madonna released her first studio album in seven years, Confessions II.
- 10 – Eva Under Fire released their first studio album in four years, Villainous.
  - Future released his first solo studio album in four years, The Real Me.
  - Girl Trouble released their first studio album in twenty-three years, As Is.
  - Ne-Yo released his first studio album in four years, Highway 79.
  - The Plot in You released their self-titled sixth studio album, their first in five years.
  - Show Me the Body released their first studio album in four years, Alone Together.
- 17 – Steve Lacy released his first studio album in four years, Oh Yeah?.
  - Motionless in White released their first studio album in four years, Decades.
  - Quicksand released their first studio album in five years, Bring On the Psychics.
  - Rick Ross released his first solo studio album in five years, Set in Stone.
  - Syd released her first studio album in four years, Beard.
  - Tesla released their first studio album in seven years, Homage.
- 18 – L7 bassist Jennifer Finch died from brain cancer at the age of 59.
- 24 – Sick of It All and former Blood from the Soul vocalist Lou Koller died from esophageal cancer at the age of 59.
  - Cypress Hill released their first studio album in four years and their first Spanish-language album, Dios Bendiga.
  - Madball released their first studio album in eight years, Not Your Kingdom.
  - The Strokes released their first studio album in six years, Reality Awaits.
- 31 – Five Finger Death Punch released their first studio album in four years, Legacy.
  - Shearwater released their first studio album in four years, The New World.

=== August ===
- 12 – Smash Mouth released their first studio album of original material in fourteen years, Mercury Comet. It is their first original album to feature current vocalist Zach Goode following founding member Steve Harwell's retirement in 2021 after various health problems and live controversies, and his subsequent death in 2023.
- 14 – Carly Simon released her first studio album in seventeen years and her first of original material in eighteen years, Comes in Waves.
  - Phoebe Bridgers released her first solo studio album in six years, Lost Weekend.
- 16 – Actress and singer Hayden Panettiere was found dead in an apartment in Greenville, South Carolina at the age of 36. She had been in cardiac arrest prior to her death.
- 17 – ZZ Top drummer Frank Beard died at the age of 77 in Richardson, Texas while in hospice care.
  - Ice-T released his first solo studio album in twenty years, Criminal Migraine.
- 21 – Weezer released their seventh self-titled album, also known as the Gold Album. It is the band's first studio album in four years and their first traditional studio album in five years.
  - Brandon Flowers of The Killers released his first solo studio album in eleven years, Thrasher.
  - Paris Jackson released her first studio album in six years, Happiest Day of My Life.
  - The Afghan Whigs released their first studio album in four years, Soft Control.
  - Lambchop released their first studio album in four years, Punching the Clown.
- 25 – Country music singer-songwriter Dolly Parton died from cancer at the age of 80.
- 28 – Alabama Shakes released their first studio album in eleven years, I Must Be Dreaming. It is their first album without drummer Steve Johnson, who was fired from the band following various legal troubles in 2020 and 2021.
  - Lauren Alaina released her first studio album in five years, Stages.
  - Sara Bareilles released her first studio album in seven years, Good Grief.
  - Dinosaur Jr. released their first studio album in five years, There Near.
  - Everlast released his first studio album in eight years, Embers to Ashes.
  - Little Big Town released their first studio album of all original material in four years, It's a Dying Art.
  - Mastodon released their first studio album in five years, Marrow Deep. It is their first album since the 2025 departure and subsequent death of former lead guitarist/vocalist Brent Hinds.
  - Interpol released their first studio album in four years, This Mirror Weighs a Ton.
  - Mike D released his debut solo studio album, Thank You. It is his first full album of new material in fourteen years since the Beastie Boys' disbandment following the death of Adam Yauch.
  - Russian Circles released their first studio album in four years, Nine.
  - Train released their first studio album in four years, Mad Dog in the Fog.
  - Saul Williams released his first solo studio album in seven years, Leap Life.

=== September ===
- 1 – Jazz singer, songwriter and producer Cassandra Wilson died at the age of 70.
- 3 – Sleep released their first studio album in eight years, Hempispheres. It is their first album with former Void guitarist Bubba Dupree and Melvins drummer Dale Crover, following Jason Roeder's firing in 2024 and Matt Pike's departure in June.
  - Hieroglyphics released their first studio album in thirteen years, All Said and Done.
- 4 – Mykki Blanco released his first studio album in four years, Cafe Paradiso.
  - The Thermals released their first studio album in ten years, Under Crushing Rain. It is the band's first album to be recorded as a solo project by frontman Hutch Harris.
- 5 – Former Every Time I Die rhythm guitarist and professional wrestler Andy Williams, also formerly known as the Butcher in All Elite Wrestling (AEW) from 2019 until June, died during an Enjoy Wrestling event in Millvale, Pennsylvania at the age of 48.
- 10 – Brian Fallon of The Gaslight Anthem released his first solo album in five years, Not Bad for New Jersey.
- 11 – Jhené Aiko released her first studio album in six years, Westside Whimsy.
- 17 – Duncan Sheik died of heart failure at the age of 56.
- 18 – Anthrax released their first studio album in ten years, Cursum Perficio.
  - Beck released his first studio album in seven years, Ride Lonesome.
  - Cartel released their first studio album in thirteen years, Learning How to Cope.
  - Chaka Khan released her first studio album in seven years, Chakzilla.
  - Nonpoint released their first studio album in eight years, The Last Word.
  - Bea Miller released her first studio album in eight years, Mr. Peaked in High School.
  - Son Lux released their first studio album in five years, Out Into.
  - Emma Ruth Rundle released her first solo studio album in five years, These Killing Times.
- 20 – New Found Glory lead guitarist, producer and former Shai Hulud and International Superheroes of Hardcore vocalist Chad Gilbert died of adrenocortical carcinoma at the age of 45.
- 25 – Tom Morello released his first solo studio album in five years, Everyone Gets Everything They Want.
  - Ian Noe released his first studio album in four years, Canyon Falls Trailer Band.
- 27 – The 2026 MTV Video Music Awards took place at the Peacock Theater in Los Angeles.

=== October ===
- 2 – Wynonna Judd released her first studio album in ten years, The Hard Truth. It is her first album release since the death of her mother and duo partner in the Judds, Naomi Judd, in 2022.
  - Miss May I released their first studio album in four years, No Place for Me.
  - Stef Chura released her first studio album in seven years, Dancing Alone on the Concrete.
  - Lee Brice released his first studio album in six years, Sunriser.
- 5 – R&B singer Freddie Jackson died at the age of 70.
- 9 – Danielle Ponder released her first studio album in four years, Everything Has Changed.
  - Laura Cortese released her first solo studio album in ten years and her first overall in six years, Lucky Water.
- 16 – Sadurn released their first studio album in four years, The Underworld.
  - The Number Twelve Looks Like You released their first studio album in seven years, Howls from the Holographic Heart.
  - @ released their first studio album in five years, Autosmile.
- 17 – Kid Rock released his first studio album in four years and his first Christian album, Halfway 2 Jesus.
- 21 – The Offspring guitarist Noodles announced that he would no longer tour with the band due to a "fairly serious" health issue.
- 23 – The Olivia Tremor Control released their final studio album and their first in twenty-seven years, The Same Place. The album features posthumous appearances from members Bill Doss and Will Cullen Hart, who died in 2012 and 2024, respectively.
  - Forbidden released their self-titled studio album, their first in sixteen years. It is the band's first album to feature current lead vocalist Norman Skinner following the retirement of original vocalist Russ Anderson.
  - Ghostemane released his first studio album in six years, AM:FM.
  - Brakence released his first studio album in four years, Marrow.
  - Wolves in the Throne Room released their first studio album in five years, Estuary.
  - Polyphia released their first studio album in four years, Be Not Afraid.
- 30 – Against the Current released their first studio album in eight years, Till Death & Back.
  - Fuel released their first studio album in five years, Pendulum. It is their first album with vocalist Aaron Scott, who was hired by the band to replace previous vocalist John Corsale in 2022.

=== November ===
- 6 – Hatebreed released their first studio album in six years, Fatal Paradox.
  - Jesse Jo Stark released her first studio album in four years, Muse.
  - SOB X RBE released their first studio album in seven years, From the Land. It is the group's first album release after the 2019 incarceration of former member Lul G for murder led to their hiatus in 2020.
- 11 – Anberlin will release their ninth studio album, Currency, which will also be their first official album to fully feature Matty Mullins of Memphis May Fire on lead vocals. Mullins was named the band's new frontman following the departure of original lead vocalist Stephen Christian earlier in the year.
- 13 – Walls of Jericho will release their first studio album in ten years, System Error: Humanity.
  - Zebra will release their first studio album in twenty-three years, V.
- 20 – Down will release their first studio album in nineteen years, Volume V.
  - Trivium will release their first studio album in five years, Crown in the Grave. It is the band's first album to feature drummer Alex Rüdinger, who joined in 2025 following the departure of Alex Bent shortly before the release of their EP Struck Dead.
- 27 – Molly Hatchet will release their first studio album in sixteen years, Lost Horizon.
  - Whiplash will release their first studio album in seventeen years, Roar.
  - Jef Whitehead, under his project Leviathan, will release his first studio album in eleven years, Die to This.

=== December ===
- 4 – Morphine will release their first album in twenty-six years, Cocoon.
- 11 – Æther Realm will release their first album in six years, Season of Bloodshed.

=== Unknown date ===
- 4 Non Blondes will release their first studio album in thirty-four years.
- Abysmal Dawn will release their first studio album in six years.
- Adema will release their first studio album in nineteen years, Cruel Machine.
- American Hi-Fi will release their first studio album in twelve years.
- Bad Religion will release their first studio album in seven years.
- Lindsey Buckingham will release his first solo studio album in five years.
- Cake will release their first studio album in fifteen years.
- Chiodos will release their first studio album in twelve years.
- Cold will release their first studio album in seven years.
- Cro-Mags will release their first studio album in six years.
- Dangerous Toys will release their first studio album in thirty-one years.
- Death Angel will release their first studio album in seven years.
- Drowning Pool will release their first studio album in four years. It will be the band's first album in sixteen years to feature returning vocalist Ryan McCombs, following Jasen Moreno's departure in 2023.
- Everclear will release their first studio album in eleven years.
- Excel will release their first studio album in thirty-one years.
- Fear Factory will release their first studio album in five years. It will be the band's first album with current lead vocalist Milo Silvestro and current drummer Pete Webber, both of whom joined in 2023.
- Lita Ford will release her first studio album in ten years and her first of all-new material in fourteen years.
- Guns N' Roses will release their first studio album in eighteen years. It will be the band's first album in thirty-three years, and their first of all-new material in thirty-five years, to feature guitarist Slash and bassist Duff McKagan.
- Icon will release their first studio album in thirty-seven years.
- Incubus will release their first studio album in nine years, Something in the Water. It will be their first studio album to feature bassist Nicole Row following the departure of longtime bassist Ben Kenney in 2023.
- The Interrupters will release their first studio album in four years.
- Korn will release their first studio album in four years.
- Limp Bizkit will release their first studio album in five years. It will be their first since the 2025 death of original bassist Sam Rivers, who had contributed to new music with the band by the time he died.
- Living Colour will release their first studio album in nine years.
- Meliah Rage will release their first studio album in eight years, Slaves in the Afterlife.
- Mudvayne will release their first studio album in seventeen years.
- Murphy's Law will release their first studio album in twenty-five years.
- Stevie Nicks will release her first solo studio album in twelve years, and her first of all-new material in fifteen years.
- Papa Roach will release their first studio album in four years.
- Power Trip will release their first studio album in nine years. It will be their first album recorded since the death of original frontman Riley Gale in 2020, and also their first to feature lead vocals by his replacement, Seth Gilmore.
- Red Hot Chili Peppers will release their first studio album in four years. It will be their third album together with guitarist John Frusciante since his second return to the band in 2019.
- Sacred Reich will release their first studio album in seven years, Into the Abyss.
- Savatage will release their first studio album in twenty-five years, Curtain Call.
- Snot will release their first studio album in twenty-six years. It will be the band's first album to feature their current lead vocalist Andy Knapp as the replacement of original vocalist Lynn Strait, who died in 1998.
- Soil will release their first studio album in thirteen years.
- Soundgarden will release their first studio album in fourteen years. Intended as their final studio album, it will include the final recordings of frontman Chris Cornell, who died in 2017.
- Spineshank will release their first studio album in fourteen years.
- Bruce Springsteen will release his first studio album in four years and his first non-archival album of original material in six years.
- Suicidal Tendencies will release their first studio album in eight years, and their first of all-new material in ten years. It will be their first release with guitarist Ben Weinman and bassist Tye Trujillo (son of former Suicidal Tendencies bassist Robert Trujillo).
- Symphony X will release their first studio album in eleven years.
- Ugly Kid Joe will release their first studio album in four years.
- Vinnie Vincent Invasion will release their first studio album in thirty-eight years, Judgment Day Guitarmageddon.
- Vio-lence will release their first studio album in thirty-three years.
- Joe Walsh will release his first solo studio album in fourteen years.
- ZZ Top will release their first studio album in fourteen years. It will be their first since the 2021 death of longtime bassist Dusty Hill and the 2026 death of longtime drummer Frank Beard, and will include unreleased tracks recorded with them.

== Bands disbanded ==
- Maddie & Tae
- Steely Dan

== List of albums released ==
=== January ===
Date	Album	Artist	Genre (s)
9	Alter Bridge	Alter Bridge	Alternative rock; hard rock
9	With Heaven on Top	Zach Bryan	Country; alternative country
9	Act III: This City Made Us	The Protomen	Hard rock; indie rock; rock opera
9	III	Pullman	Acoustic rock; folk; alternative folk
16	Don't Be Dumb	ASAP Rocky	Experimental hip-hop; trap; psychedelic
16	Locket	Madison Beer	Pop; R&B
16	Stand on My Shoulders	Nicholas Galanin	Electronic
16	The Dreamin' Kind	Langhorne Slim	Alternative rock; indie rock
16	Eat Yourself	Together Pangea	Surf rock; garage rock; indie rock
23	Everywhere You Look	Currensy	Southern hip-hop
23	Boycott Heaven	The Format	Indie rock
23	Nine Lives	Goldfinger	Pop-punk; ska punk; punk rock
23	20/20	The Infamous Stringdusters	Progressive bluegrass; country; folk
23	Melodrama	Lina	R&B; soul; jazz
23	Megadeth	Megadeth	Thrash metal
23	Death in the Business of Whaling	Searows	Indie folk; bedroom pop
30	My Ghosts Go Ghost	By Storm	Experimental hip-hop
30	Can I Get a Pack of Camel Lights?	Geologist	Electronic
30	Closer to Happy	Joseph	Pop; folk rock
30	I Used to Go to This Bar	Joyce Manor	Pop-punk; indie pop; punk rock; power pop
30	Octane	Don Toliver	Trap; alternative hip-hop
30	Backward	Jordan Ward	R&B; hip-hop

=== February ===
Date	Album	Artist	Genre (s)
2	Lost in the Wonder	Cory Wong	Funk; pop
6	The Space Between Us	Robert Deeble	Folk
6	Odyssey	Illenium	Electro house; pop-punk
6	The Fall-Off	J. Cole	Hip-hop
6	Under the Streetlights	Michael Marcagi	Americana; indie pop; pop rock
6	Normal Isn't	Puscifer	Art rock; alternative rock
6	Tenterhooks	Silversun Pickups	Alternative rock; indie rock
13	Cold 2 The Touch	Angel Dust	Pop rock; hardcore punk
13	Love Is Not Enough	Converge	Metalcore; hardcore punk
13	What a Time to Be Alive	The Lone Bellow	Americana; alternative country; indie folk
13	Mariachi El Bronx IV	Mariachi El Bronx	Mariachi; punk rock; alternative rock
13	A.R.S.O.N.	Story of the Year	Post-hardcore; melodic hardcore; rap rock; alternative rock; alternative metal; nu metal
13	Up Above	Wrabel	Indie rock; alternative rock; pop
20	Casino	Baby Keem	Alternative hip-hop; trap
20	Luck... or Something	Hilary Duff	Pop; dance-pop
20	Red Asphalt	Exhumed	Death metal
20	Dedication	Mirah	Indie rock; indie pop
20	Cloud 9	Megan Moroney	Country; pop
20	Somewhere In Between	Mothica	Pop-punk; alternative rock
20	Listen Up!	New Found Glory	Pop-punk; punk rock; emo
27	My Days of 58	Bill Callahan	Indie folk; alternative country
27	Heaven 2	Lala Lala	Indie rock
27	The Romantic	Bruno Mars	Soft soul; retro-soul; disco; funk
27	Base	Ritt Momney	Indie pop
27	Glass Minds	A Thousand Horses	Country rock; Southern rock
27	Dreamers in Exile	Voxtrot	Indie pop; indie rock
27	Cheap Heat	A Wilhelm Scream	Melodic hardcore; punk rock
27	The Great Satan	Rob Zombie	Hard rock; alternative rock

=== March ===
Date	Album	Artist	Genre (s)
6	Hoppers	Mark Mothersbaugh	Post-punk; art punk; film score
6	Reality Star	Surfbort	Punk rock
6	Hellhound	Vial	Pop-punk; punk rock
13	A Pound of Feathers	The Black Crowes	Southern rock; blues rock; hard rock; roots rock; jam band
13	A Light That Waits	The Fray	Pop rock; rock
13	Mutiny After Midnight	Johnny Blue Skies	Funk rock; disco; country rock
13	Into Oblivion	Lamb of God	Groove metal; metalcore; thrash metal
13	Still There's a Glow	Sweet Pill	Midwest emo; punk rock; pop-punk
20	The Way I Am	Luke Combs	Country
20	Goliath	Exodus	Thrash metal
20	No Need to Be Lonely	Gladie	Indie rock
20	We Need to Talk: Redemption	Keri Hilson	R&B
20	An Undying Love for a Burning World	Neurosis	Post-metal; post-hardcore
20	Peace in Place	Poison the Well	Metalcore; post-hardcore; experimental hardcore
20	Closer to the Sun	Tyketto	Hard rock; glam metal
27	Almost There	The Academy Is...	Pop-punk; indie pop; emo
27	Engines of Demolition	Black Label Society	Heavy metal; Southern metal; hard rock; groove metal; biker metal
27	Everything Glows	Cannons	Indie pop; electropop; indie rock
27	Rise	Melissa Etheridge	Folk rock; roots rock; blues rock
27	Honora	Flea	Jazz; rock
27	Before the World Caves In	Good Riddance	Melodic hardcore; pop-punk
27	Blinking as the Starlight Burns Out	Paula Kelley	Indie pop; indie rock
27	Heavy on the Soul	Ty Myers	Country
27	Worst Girl in America	Slayyyter	Pop; electropop; dance-pop
27	Ricochet	Snail Mail	Indie rock
27	Lost on You	Tigers Jaw	Indie rock; Midwest emo; pop-punk
27	Moo	King Tuff	Garage rock; indie rock; power pop
28	Bully	Kanye West	Alternative hip-hop; industrial rap

=== April ===
Date	Album	Artist	Genre (s)
3	Good, Like It Should Be	Ber	Indie pop
3	Good God / Baad Man	Corrosion of Conformity	Stoner metal; Southern metal; sludge metal; hardcore punk
3	Sunn O)))	Sunn O)))	Drone metal; doom metal; experimental metal; black metal; noise rock; dark ambient
3	The Master Plan	Michael Sweet	Hard rock; heavy metal
10	Nowhere, At Last	Broadside	Pop rock; pop-punk; emo; indie pop
10	Dandelion	Ella Langley	Country
10	Joy Next Door	The Maine	Alternative rock; pop rock
10	Dead to Rights	Metal Church	Heavy metal; power metal; thrash metal; speed metal
14	The World Is to Dig	They Might Be Giants	Alternative rock; power pop
17	Veils	Vanessa Carlton	Pop
17	Chasing the Hydra	Crimson Glory	Heavy metal; progressive metal; power metal
17	Reflections	From Ashes to New	Rap rock; rap metal; alternative metal
17	Something Is a Shell	Sofia Isella	Pop rock; indie pop; dark pop
17	Nine Inch Noize	Nine Inch Noize	Industrial techno
17	Sanctions	Souled American	Alternative country; Americana
21	Zenzealia	Azealia Banks	Spoken word
24	Beautiful Day	Akon	Afrobeats; R&B; reggae
24	Songs About Us	Jason Aldean	Country; country rock
24	The End Is Not the End	Atreyu	Metalcore; post-hardcore; hard rock
24	Chasing Crowns	The Cab	Alternative rock; pop rock; power pop
24	New Day	John Corabi	Hard rock; heavy metal
24	Graceland Way	Mikaela Davis	Alternative rock
24	Location Lost	Failure	Alternative rock; post-grunge; space rock
24	Your Favorite Toy	Foo Fighters	Alternative rock; post-grunge; hard rock
24	Something Worth Waiting For	Friko	Indie rock
24	The Great Divide	Noah Kahan	Americana; folk; folk rock
24	Kehlani	Kehlani	R&B
24	Still Suffer	Terror	Hardcore punk
24	Toy with Me	Meghan Trainor	Pop; dance-pop
24	Love You Madly Hate You Badly	Oliver Tree	Indie pop; pop rock; alternative rock

=== May ===
Date	Album	Artist	Genre (s)
1	American Football	American Football	Midwest emo; indie rock; indie pop
1	In Times of Dragons	Tori Amos	Alternative rock; pop rock
1	Long Wave Home	Jesca Hoop	Folk; jazz; pop
1	Middle of Nowhere	Kacey Musgraves	Country
1	It's Been Awful	Isaiah Rashad	Hip-hop
1	The Charmer	Toadies	Grunge; alternative rock; hard rock; punk rock
1	Sound of a Woman	Rita Wilson	Country; pop
1	Victory Garden	Young the Giant	Alternative rock; indie rock
8	The Me That Remains	Amy Grant	Folk-pop
8	Barely Here	Koyo	Pop-punk; melodic hardcore
8	Dancing on the Wall	Muna	Indie pop; synth-pop; electropop
8	Arcade	Deb Never	Indie pop; emo pop
8	Let It Die Here	Linda Perry	Alternative rock; pop rock
8	Born to Kill	Social Distortion	Punk rock; rock
15	Change of Plans	49 Winchester	Alternative country; Americana
15	Sandbox	The All-American Rejects	Alternative rock; power pop; pop rock; pop-punk
15	Livin Proof	Robin Beck	Pop; rock
15	Little Wide Open	Kevin Morby	Indie rock; folk rock
15	Retrospect	Mya	R&B
15	Stone Cold Anger	Pro-Pain	Groove metal; thrash metal
15	American Stories	Rostam	Art pop; indie pop; indie rock
15	Of Earth & Wires	Dua Saleh	R&B; pop; hip-hop; soul
22	The Anthology of Unamerican Folk Music	Marisa Anderson	Americana
22	Emotion Factory Reset	Armored Saint	Groove metal; thrash metal
22	Everyone for Ten Minutes	Bleachers	Alternative rock; indie pop; rock
22	Who's Keeping Time?	Alela Diane	Indie rock; Americana
22	Wasted Potential	Skylar Grey	Pop; pop rock; indie pop
22	Ugly Duckling Union	Lowerton	Indie rock
22	Paradessence	Visible Cloaks	Electronic; new age
29	Undead Melody	Dark Divine	Metalcore; post-hardcore
29	All In Now	Dogstar	Alternative rock; grunge
29	Eight	Shinedown	Hard rock; alternative rock; pop rock
29	Cut a Silhouette	Sparta	Post-hardcore; rock; hard rock
29	Philadelphia's Been Good to Me	Kurt Vile	Indie rock; folk rock; psychedelic rock

=== June ===
Date	Album	Artist	Genre (s)
5	Neon Summer Skin	Bedouine	Folk
5	Hum of Hurt	Converge	Metalcore; hardcore punk
5	I Built You a Tower	Death Cab for Cutie	Rock
5	Sanctuary	Evanescence	Rock
5	Bitch	Lizzo	Pop; R&B
5	What a Time	Barry Manilow	Pop
5	Bridges	Jo Dee Messina	Country
5	An Eraser and a Maze	Modest Mouse	Indie rock
5	Louder Than Fate	Jared James Nichols	Hard rock; blues rock
5	Grateful	The Red Clay Strays	Country
5	Roses	Widowspeak	Indie rock; dream pop
5	The Hymns	CeCe Winans	Christian
12	U	Baauer	EDM; trap
12	7 Seas	Dirty Heads	Rap rock; reggae rock; alternative hip-hop; alternative rock
12	Signal Fire	Genghis Tron	Experimental metal
12	Khemmis	Khemmis	Doom metal
12	So Help Me God	Kelsey Lu	Avant-pop; baroque pop
12	Dirty Blonde	Bebe Rexha	Dance-pop; pop
12	You Seem Pretty Sad for a Girl So in Love	Olivia Rodrigo	Pop; indie pop; pop rock; synth-pop
12	An Ending in Itself	Sleeping with Sirens	Post-hardcore; pop-punk; metalcore; emo
12	Medusa	Stitched Up Heart	Hard rock; alternative metal
12	Until the Sun Explodes	Sublime	Ska punk; reggae rock
19	D12 Forever (Vol. 1)	D12	Hip-hop; horrorcore
19	Sweet American Boy	Honestav	Alternative rock; indie rock
19	Saturday Night/Sunday Morning	PJ Morton	R&B; soul
19	The Story of Michael and Tanya	The War and Treaty	Southern soul; R&B; gospel
19	Whack's Museum	Tierra Whack	Hip-hop; R&B
19	The Gentlemen's Club	YG	Hip-hop
19	Dream Me A Dream	Tucker Zimmerman	Blues; folk
26	After the Astronaut	Butthole Surfers	Noise rock; experimental rock; alternative rock; psychedelic rock; art punk
26	Public Luxury	Downtown Boys	Punk rock
26	Time Will Tell	Devon Gilfillian	Hip-hop; R&B; soul
26	Clef Notes – Quantum Leap, Vol. 1	Wyclef Jean	Hip-hop; R&B
26	Sotera	Junius	Post-metal; art rock
26	Dear God	The Pretty Reckless	Alternative rock; blues rock; hard rock
26	Critters Encore	Some Velvet Sidewalk	Lo-fi; noise rock; indie rock
26	Forever Now	Switchfoot	Alternative rock; rock; Christian rock
26	Kill the King	T.I.	Southern hip-hop; trap

=== July ===
Date	Album	Artist	Genre (s)
3	Xperiment	Ken Carson	Trap; Southern hip-hop
3	Live From The Guild Theater	L.A. Guns	Hard rock; heavy metal
3	Livin' in the USA	Low Cut Connie	Rock and roll
3	Confessions II	Madonna	Pop; dance-pop
3	Days of Unrest	Margo Price	Country; pop
10	Villainous	Eva Under Fire	Hard rock; alternative metal
10	The Real Me	Future	Trap; Southern hip-hop
10	As Is	Girl Trouble	Garage rock; indie rock; punk rock
10	Adam	Adam Lambert	Pop; dance
10	Highway 79	Ne-Yo	R&B; pop
10	The Plot in You	The Plot in You	Metalcore; post-hardcore
10	Alone Together	Show Me the Body	Post-hardcore; hardcore punk; art punk
10	Frozen Charlotte	Jack White	Rock; garage rock; alternative rock
17	Daughter from Hell	Gracie Abrams	Pop; folk
17	Oh Yeah?	Steve Lacy	R&B; soul
17	Give My Country Back	Aaron Lewis	Alternative country; country rock
17	Decades	Motionless in White	Nu metal; metalcore
17	Bring On the Psychics	Quicksand	Post-hardcore; alternative metal
17	Set in Stone	Rick Ross	Hip-hop
17	Beard	Syd	R&B; neo soul
17	Homage	Tesla	Hard rock
24	Dios Bendiga	Cypress Hill	Latin hip-hop
24	I Can See	Nick Hakim	Neo soul; pop
24	Not Your Kingdom	Madball	Hardcore punk
24	Sugar	Mayday Parade	Pop-punk; pop rock; alternative rock
24	Get It Honest	The Revivalists	Alternative rock; rock
24	Reality Awaits	The Strokes	Indie rock; garage rock revival; post-punk revival; new wave; synth-pop
24	Jinx	Waterparks	Pop rock; pop-punk; alternative rock; electronic
31	The Final Painting	Ed Askew	Folk
31	Grits and Glory	Albert Castiglia	Electric blues
31	Legacy	Five Finger Death Punch	Hard rock; heavy metal
31	Do You Feel Guilty Being Okay?	Framing Hanley	Alternative rock; hard rock
31	Petal	Ariana Grande	Pop; R&B; dance
31	The New World	Shearwater	Indie rock; folk rock

=== August ===
Date	Album	Artist	Genre (s)
7	Tell Me Your Dream	Ceremony	Punk rock; post-punk; hardcore punk
7	Halcyon Blues	Citizen	Alternative rock; post-hardcore
7	I Am Both	Margaret Glaspy	Rock; pop
7	Days	The Mountain Goats	Indie folk; indie rock; folk rock
7	Once Upon A Second Time Around	Charlie Worsham	Country
12	Mercury Comet	Smash Mouth	Alternative rock; surf punk
14	Lost Weekend	Phoebe Bridgers	Indie pop; folk rock
14	Ashley Cooke	Ashley Cooke	Country; pop
14	I Am a Prism	Judah & the Lion	Rock; folk rock; alternative rock
14	The Big One	Dent May	Indie rock; new wave
14	Comes in Waves	Carly Simon	Pop
14	You Say I Romanticize	Sweeping Promises	Post-punk; indie rock; new wave
21	Soft Control	The Afghan Whigs	Alternative rock; indie rock; post-punk
21	Thrasher	Brandon Flowers	Country; Americana
21	Materia	Julia Holter	Art pop; chamber pop; modern classical
21	Happiest Day of My Life	Paris Jackson	Alternative folk; folk rock
21	Punching the Clown	Lambchop	Alternative rock; alternative country
21	Flowers	David Nail	Country; Americana
21	Trespasser	Grace Potter	Rock; pop
21	Weezer (Gold Album)	Weezer	Alternative rock; pop rock
28	I Must Be Dreaming	Alabama Shakes	Rock
28	Stages	Lauren Alaina	Country
28	Good Grief	Sara Bareilles	Pop
28	There Near	Dinosaur Jr.	Alternative rock; indie rock; noise rock
28	Embers to Ashes	Everlast	Folk rock; blues rock
28	Rats in the Temple	Flotsam and Jetsam	Thrash metal; heavy metal
28	Witch	In This Moment	Hard rock; metalcore
28	This Mirror Weighs a Ton	Interpol	Post-punk; art rock
28	Q Theory – Quantum Leap, Vol. 2	Wyclef Jean	Hip-hop; R&B; soul; jazz
28	Gotta Get Out	The Linda Lindas	Punk rock; pop-punk; alternative rock
28	It's a Dying Art	Little Big Town	Country
28	Marrow Deep	Mastodon	Progressive metal; sludge metal
28	Thank You	Mike D	Hip-hop
28	Timeless	Prince	Pop; R&B; soul
28	Nine	Russian Circles	Post-metal; post-rock
28	Mad Dog in the Fog	Train	Pop rock; rock
28	Wildchild	Alex Warren	Folk-pop
28	Leap Life	Saul Williams	Alternative hip-hop

=== September ===
Date	Album	Artist	Genre (s)
3	All Said and Done	Hieroglyphics	Alternative hip-hop
3	Hempispheres	Sleep	Doom metal; stoner metal
4	Cafe Paradiso	Mykki Blanco	Alternative hip-hop; alternative rock; art pop
4	Who Loves the Sun	Chat Pile	Sludge metal; noise rock
4	Bloody Dreams	Devil Master	Black metal; deathrock
4	Lucro Sucio; Unfinished Business	The Mars Volta	Progressive rock; art rock; post-rock
4	Happier Now	Movements	Emo; post-hardcore
4	Under Crushing Rain	The Thermals	Indie rock; punk rock
10	Not Bad for New Jersey	Brian Fallon	Rock; punk rock; garage rock
11	Westside Whimsy	Jhené Aiko	R&B
11	Get Mean	Boy Harsher	Dark wave; post-industrial
11	Rent Money	Pokey LaFarge	Blues; folk; country; jazz
11	Buddy Miller	Buddy Miller	Country; Americana
11	Who Sent You?	Shudder to Think	Indie rock; art rock; power pop
18	Cursum Perficio	Anthrax	Thrash metal
18	I See Them I See Me	Babehoven	Indie rock
18	Ride Lonesome	Beck	Alternative rock; folk rock
18	Learning How to Cope	Cartel	Pop-punk; alternative rock; rock
18	That's Just Me	Riley Green	Country
18	Chakzilla	Chaka Khan	R&B; pop; funk
18	Mr. Peaked in High School	Bea Miller	Pop; pop rock
18	The Last Word	Nonpoint	Nu metal; alternative metal; hard rock
18	Picnic at the Cemetery	Bella Poarch	Dark pop; alternative pop; pop
18	These Killing Times	Emma Ruth Rundle	Ambient; folk; post-rock
18	Out Into	Son Lux	Experimental rock; post-rock
25	The Version of Me You Get	Wade Bowen	Country; Texas country
25	Silver Sands Marina	Kenny Chesney	Country; country rock
25	The Hollowing of Godflesh	Crown Magnetar	Deathcore; heavy metal
25	Ramblin'	Dylan Gossett	Country; red dirt; Texas country
25	Everyone Gets Everything They Want	Tom Morello	Alternative metal; rap metal; hardcore punk
25	Canyon Falls Trailer Band	Ian Noe	Country; folk; Americana
25	Live From Hell	Weakened Friends	Indie rock

=== October ===
Date	Album	Artist	Genre (s)
2	The Day I Hang It Up	Gavin Adcock	Country; country rock; Southern rock
2	Sunriser	Lee Brice	Country
2	Dancing Alone on the Concrete	Stef Chura	Indie rock
2	Friends That I Don't Like	Dexter and the Moonrocks	Alternative rock; grunge; country rock; indie rock
2	The Last Goodbye	Escape the Fate	Post-hardcore; metalcore
2	All Set the Bone	Greg Freeman	Alternative country
2	The Hard Truth	Wynonna Judd	Country
2	No Place for Me	Miss May I	Metalcore; heavy metal
2	Frequency of Love	Victoria Monét	R&B; soul; pop
9	All Inside Aquarium	Bodega	Art rock; indie rock; post-punk
9	Lucky Water	Laura Cortese	Folk
9	Welcome to Earth	Death Valley Girls	Garage rock; punk rock; gothic rock
9	Palace For the People	Greta Van Fleet	Hard rock; progressive rock; alternative rock
9	Everything Has Changed	Danielle Ponder	R&B; soul
9	My Second Rodeo	Todd Snider	Folk; blues; alternative country
16	Autosmile	@	Folk; pop
16	Cookie Happened	Eels	Alternative rock; indie rock
16	Uncle	Fish Narc	Emo; indie rock; post-punk
16	Big Stupid Heart	Andy Grammer	Pop
16	Jesus & Whiskey	K. Michelle	Country; pop; R&B; soul
16	Howls from the Holographic Heart	The Number Twelve Looks Like You	Mathcore; metalcore; post-hardcore
16	The Underworld	Sadurn	Indie rock
17	Halfway 2 Jesus	Kid Rock	Christian
23	Marrow	Brakence	Hyperpop; emo rap; Midwest emo
23	Watertown	Brothers Osborne	Country
23	Don't Turn Around	Grey DeLisle	Country; pop
23	Empty on the Inside	Entheos	Technical death metal; progressive metal
23	Forbidden	Forbidden	Groove metal; thrash metal
23	AM:FM	Ghostemane	Hip-hop; heavy metal; industrial
23	Calling Antonin	James Brandon Lewis	Jazz; pop
23	The Same Place	The Olivia Tremor Control	Neo-psychedelia; indie rock; experimental rock
23	Be Not Afraid	Polyphia	Progressive rock
23	Estuary	Wolves in the Throne Room	Black metal; heavy metal
30	Till Death & Back	Against the Current	Alternative rock; pop rock; pop-punk
30	Pendulum	Fuel	Hard rock; alternative rock; alternative metal
30	Bleach	Haiden Henderson	Pop-punk; alternative pop; pop rock
30	Hate to Go – Take Out or Delivery	Ministry	Hard rock; heavy metal
30	Perfecth	Queens of the Stone Age	Alternative rock; hard rock; rock
30	Cherry Soda	Wavves	Emo; punk rock; indie rock

=== November ===
Date	Album	Artist	Genre (s)
6	More Than Misery	Carnifex	Deathcore; hard rock; heavy metal
6	N.Y. Baby	Blu DeTiger	Indie pop
6	Fatal Paradox	Hatebreed	Hard rock; heavy metal
6	O My Beloved	Kings of Leon	Rock; alternative rock; indie rock
6	An Exchange of Information	Oso Oso	Emo; pop-punk; indie rock
6	From the Land	SOB X RBE	Hip-hop
6	Muse	Jesse Jo Stark	Indie rock; alternative pop

== List of albums set to be released ==
=== November ===
Date	Album	Artist	Genre (s)
11	Currency	Anberlin	Alternative rock; emo; pop-punk
13	Trouble Mountain	Aesop Rock and Blockhead	Hip-hop
13	Devotion	David Kushner	Folk pop; indie pop
13	System Error: Humanity	Walls of Jericho	Metalcore; hardcore punk; thrash metal
13	V	Zebra	Hard rock; progressive rock; heavy metal
20	Until We Disappear	Any Given Sin	Hard rock; heavy metal
20	Volume V	Down	Hard rock; heavy metal; Southern metal
20	As Killers Do	Lael Neale	Indie rock
20	Crown in the Grave	Trivium	Metalcore; thrash metal; heavy metal; progressive metal
27	La Grande Mort or Silence of God	King 810	Hard rock; heavy metal; rap metal
27	Lost Horizon	Molly Hatchet	Southern rock; hard rock; blues rock
27	PeelingFlesh	PeelingFlesh	Brutal death metal; beatdown hardcore; slam death metal
27	Roar	Whiplash	Thrash metal; speed metal

=== December ===
Date	Album	Artist	Genre (s)
4	Pressure is a Privilege	K. Sparks	Hip-hop
4	Cocoon	Morphine	Alternative rock; blues rock
4	Worst Man in America	Slayyyter	Pop; synth-pop; dance-pop
11	Season of Bloodshed	Æther Realm	Melodic death metal; hard rock
11	No Love Without Despair	Hollow Front	Metalcore

== Unknown date ==
=== TBA ===
- Cruel Machine by Adema
- TBA by American Hi-Fi
- TBA by Bad Religion
- TBA by Lindsey Buckingham
- TBA by Cake
- TBA by Chiodos
- TBA by Cold
- TBA by Cro-Mags
- TBA by Dangerous Toys
- TBA by Death Angel
- TBA by Drowning Pool
- TBA by Everclear
- TBA by Excel
- TBA by Guns N' Roses
- TBA by Icon
- Something in the Water by Incubus
- TBA by Kerry King
- TBA by Korn
- TBA by Limp Bizkit
- TBA by Living Colour
- Slaves in the Afterlife by Meliah Rage
- Orphan Train by John Mellencamp
- TBA by Mudvayne
- TBA by Murphy's Law
- TBA by Stevie Nicks
- TBA by Obituary
- TBA by Papa Roach
- TBA by Power Trip
- Into the Abyss by Sacred Reich
- Curtain Call by Savatage
- TBA by Snot
- TBA by Soil
- TBA by Soundgarden
- TBA by Spineshank
- TBA by Bruce Springsteen
- TBA by Billy Strings
- TBA by Suicidal Tendencies
- TBA by Symphony X
- Judgment Day Guitarmageddon by Vinnie Vincent Invasion
- TBA by Vio-lence
- TBA by Joe Walsh
- TBA by ZZ Top

== Top songs on record ==
=== Billboard Hot 100 Number 1 Songs ===
- "All I Want for Christmas Is You" – Mariah Carey (2 weeks in 2019, 2 weeks in 2020, 2 weeks in 2021, 5 weeks in 2022, 3 weeks in 2023, 3 weeks in 2024, 4 weeks in 2025, 1 week in 2026)
- "Aperture" – Harry Styles (1 week)
- "Choosin' Texas" – Ella Langley (26 weeks so far)
- "Drop Dead" – Olivia Rodrigo (1 week)
- "DTMF" – Bad Bunny (1 week)
- "Hate That I Made You Love Me" – Ariana Grande (1 week)
- "I Just Might" – Bruno Mars (3 weeks)
- "I Knew It, I Knew You" – Taylor Swift (2 weeks)
- "Janice STFU" – Drake (2 weeks)
- "Opalite" – Taylor Swift (1 week)
- "Patient Zero" – Taylor Swift (3 weeks)
- "Swim" – BTS (1 week)
- "The Fate of Ophelia" – Taylor Swift (8 weeks in 2025, 2 weeks in 2026)

=== Billboard Hot 100 Top 20 Hits ===
- "2 Hard 4 the Radio" – Drake (#9)
- "9 to 5" – Dolly Parton (#1 in 1981, #18 in 2026)
- "20 Cigarettes" – Morgan Wallen (#15)
- "A Holly Jolly Christmas" – Burl Ives (#4 in 2020, #12 in 2026)
- "All I Want for Christmas Is You" – Mariah Carey (#1)
- "American Cars" – Noah Kahan (#16)
- "American Girls" – Harry Styles (#4)
- "Aperture" – Harry Styles (#1)
- "B's on the Table" – Drake featuring 21 Savage (#12)
- "Babydoll" – Dominic Fike (#10)
- "Babylon" – Taylor Swift (#4)
- "Back to Friends" – Sombr (#7)
- "Baile Inolvidable" – Bad Bunny (#2)
- "Bby Wow" – Karol G, Judeline and Rusowsky (#6)
- "Be By You" – Luke Combs (#12)
- "Be Her" – Ella Langley (#2)
- "Beauty and a Beat" – Justin Bieber featuring Nicki Minaj (#5 in 2013, #11 in 2026)
- "Been By Now" – Morgan Wallen (#2)
- "Begged" – Olivia Rodrigo (#16)
- "Billie Jean" – Michael Jackson (#1 in 1983, #15 in 2026)
- "Body" – Don Toliver (#14)
- "Boston" – Stella Lefty (#2)
- "Bottom of Your Boots" – Ella Langley (#20)
- "Burning Bridges" – Drake (#13)
- "Choosin' Texas" – Ella Langley (#1)
- "Christmas (Baby Please Come Home)" – Darlene Love (#14)
- "Cleveland!" – Taylor Swift (#3)
- "Cold Shoulder" – Drake, Don Toliver and Yebba (#18)
- "Coming Up Roses" – Harry Styles (#18)
- "Courtesy of the Red, White and Blue (The Angry American)" – Toby Keith (#11)
- "Dai Dai" – Shakira and Burna Boy (#17)
- "Daisies" – Justin Bieber (#2 in 2025, #8 in 2026)
- "Dashboard" – Noah Kahan (#19)
- "Dead Fresh" – Lil Baby (#18)
- "Deck the Halls" – Nat King Cole (#16 in 2022, #20 in 2026)
- "Die on This Hill" – Sienna Spiro (#19)
- "Don't We" – Morgan Wallen (#16)
- "Doors" – Noah Kahan (#9)
- "Dracula" – Tame Impala and Jennie (#5)
- "Drop Dead" – Olivia Rodrigo (#1)
- "DTMF" – Bad Bunny (#1)
- "Dust" – Drake (#8)
- "E85" – Don Toliver (#15)
- "Earrings" – Malcolm Todd (#17)
- "End of August" – Noah Kahan (#14)
- "End of Beginning" – Djo (#6)
- "Eoo" – Bad Bunny (#11)
- "Expectations" – Olivia Rodrigo and Chappell Roan (#3)
- "FDO" – Pooh Shiesty (#12)
- "Feliz Navidad" – José Feliciano (#6 in 2021, #11 in 2026)
- "Folded" – Kehlani (#6)
- "Golden" – Huntrix (#1 in 2025, #2 in 2026)
- "Hate That I Made You Love Me" – Ariana Grande (#1)
- "Homewrecker" – Sombr (#15)
- "Honeybee" – Olivia Rodrigo (#9)
- "Housewife" – Tate McRae (#2)
- "I Can't Love You Anymore" – Ella Langley and Morgan Wallen (#4)
- "I Got Better" – Morgan Wallen (#7 in 2025, #11 in 2026)
- "I Just Might" – Bruno Mars (#1)
- "I Knew It, I Knew You" – Taylor Swift (#1)
- "Iloveitiloveitiloveit" – Bella Kay (#17)
- "It Depends" – Chris Brown featuring Bryson Tiller (#16 in 2025, #17 in 2026)
- "It's Beginning to Look a Lot Like Christmas" – Michael Bublé (#12 in 2025, #13 in 2026)
- "It's Beginning to Look a Lot Like Christmas" – Perry Como and The Fontane Sisters with Mitchell Ayres and His Orchestra (#12 in 2020, #18 in 2026)
- "It's the Most Wonderful Time of the Year" – Andy Williams (#5 in 2021, #9 in 2026)
- "Jaded" – Koe Wetzel and Ella Langley (#15)
- "Janice STFU" – Drake (#1)
- "Jingle Bell Rock" – Bobby Helms (#2 in 2025, #3 in 2026)
- "Jingle Bells" – Frank Sinatra (#16 in 2023, #17 in 2026)
- "Jolene" – Dolly Parton (#16)
- "Last Christmas" – Wham! (#2 in 2025, #4 in 2026)
- "Last Thing You Need" – Morgan Wallen (#9)
- "Let It Snow, Let It Snow, Let It Snow" – Dean Martin (#7)
- "Lies" – Zach Bryan featuring Lana Del Rey (#4)
- "Little Birdie" – Drake (#18)
- "Loser" – Tame Impala (#18)
- "Loving Life Again" – Ella Langley (#16)
- "Maggots for Brains" – Olivia Rodrigo (#12)
- "Make Them Cry" – Drake (#7)
- "Make Them Pay" – Drake (#10)
- "Make Them Remember" – Drake (#19)
- "Man I Need" – Olivia Dean (#2)
- "Manchild" – Sabrina Carpenter (#1 in 2025, #18 in 2026)
- "Midnight Sun" – Zara Larsson (#12)
- "Mutt" – Leon Thomas (#6 in 2025, #9 in 2026)
- "My Way" – Olivia Rodrigo (#15)
- "National Treasures" – Drake (#6)
- "Nicole Kidman" – Adéla (#6)
- "Nuevayol" – Bad Bunny (#5)
- "Oh Yeah?" – Steve Lacy (#19)
- "Opalite" – Taylor Swift (#1)
- "Ordinary" – Alex Warren (#1 in 2025, #2 in 2026)
- "Patient Zero" – Taylor Swift (#1)
- "Petal" – Ariana Grande (#4)
- "Pink Clouding" – Taylor Swift (#5)
- "Plastic Cigarette" – Zach Bryan (#13)
- "Plot Twist" – Drake (#11)
- "Porch Light" – Noah Kahan (#20)
- "Quebec" – Drake (#11)
- "Ran to Atlanta" – Drake featuring Future and Molly Santana (#2)
- "Ready, Steady, Go!" – Harry Styles (#15)
- "Risk It All" – Bruno Mars (#4)
- "Rockin' Around the Christmas Tree" – Brenda Lee (#1 in 2023, #2 in 2026)
- "Run Rudolph Run" – Chuck Berry (#10 in 2021, #15 in 2026)
- "Santa Baby" – Eartha Kitt with Henri René and His Orchestra (#19)
- "Santa Tell Me" – Ariana Grande (#5)
- "Shabang" – Drake (#4)
- "Sleepless in a Hotel Room" – Luke Combs (#11)
- "Sleigh Ride" – The Ronettes (#8 in 2023, #10 in 2026)
- "So Easy (To Fall in Love)" – Olivia Dean (#5)
- "Solar Eclipse" – Drake and Don Toliver (#5)
- "Spend Dat" – Yung Miami (#17)
- "Stateside" – PinkPantheress and Zara Larsson (#6)
- "Stupid Song" – Olivia Rodrigo (#3)
- "Swim" – BTS (#1)
- "Taste Back" – Harry Styles (#17)
- "The Christmas Song (Merry Christmas to You)" – Nat King Cole (#6)
- "The Cure" – Olivia Rodrigo (#5)
- "The Fate of Ophelia" – Taylor Swift (#1)
- "The Great Divide" – Noah Kahan (#6)
- "Thriller" – Michael Jackson (#4 in 1984, #20 in 2026)
- "Tit for Tat" – Tate McRae (#3 in 2025, #20 in 2026)
- "Tití Me Preguntó" – Bad Bunny (#5 in 2022, #7 in 2026)
- "Two Six" – J. Cole (#16)
- "U + Me = ＜3" – Olivia Rodrigo (#19)
- "Underneath the Tree" – Kelly Clarkson (#7 in 2025, #8 in 2026)
- "Voy a Llevarte Pa' PR" – Bad Bunny (#14)
- "WGFT" – Gunna featuring Burna Boy (#16)
- "What Did I Miss?" – Drake (#2 in 2025, #15 in 2026)
- "What I Want" – Morgan Wallen featuring Tate McRae (#1 in 2025, #19 in 2026)
- "What You Saying" – Lil Uzi Vert (#12)
- "What's Wrong with Me" – Olivia Rodrigo and Robert Smith (#17)
- "Where Is My Husband!" – Raye (#11)
- "Whisper My Name" – Drake (#3)
- "White Christmas" – Bing Crosby (#12 in 1962, #16 in 2026)
- "Yukon" – Justin Bieber (#12)

== Deaths ==
- January 2 – Johnny Legend, 77, rockabilly musician
- January 6 – Jim McBride, 78, country music songwriter
- January 8 – Guy Moon, 63, television composer
- January 10 – Bob Weir, 78, rock singer and guitarist (Grateful Dead)
- January 17 – Tucker Zimmerman, 84, singer-songwriter
- January 18 – Ralph Towner, 85, jazz multi-instrumentalist
- January 19 – Billy Parker, 88, country music singer and DJ, guitarist
- January 23 – Guy Hovis, 84, country, jazz, and gospel singer
- January 25 – Gabe Lopez, 43, singer, songwriter, producer
- January 26 – Richie Beirach, 78, jazz pianist and composer
- January 28 – Bryan Loren, 59, songwriter and producer
- January 30 – Parthenon Huxley, 70, singer, songwriter, producer (ELO Part II, The Or Orchestra)
- January 31 –
  - Mingo Lewis, 72, percussionist and drummer (Santana, The Tubes)
  - Billy Bass Nelson, 75, bass guitarist (Funkadelic, Parliament Funkadelic)
- February 1 – Steve Washington, 67, trumpeter (Slave, Aurra)
- February 2 –
  - Chuck Negron, 83, singer (Three Dog Night)
  - Ken Peplowski, 66, jazz clarinetist and tenor saxophonist
- February 3 –
  - Ron Kenoly, 81, Christian singer and songwriter
  - Lamonte McLemore, 90, pop singer (The 5th Dimension)
- February 4 – Tommy Crook, 81, blue grass, country and jazz guitarist
- February 5 – Fred Smith, 77, funk and soul bassist (Television, Blondie)
- February 6 – Lynn Blakey, singer (Tres Chicas, Let's Active)
- February 7 –
  - Brad Arnold, 47, rock singer (3 Doors Down)
  - Greg Brown, 56, guitarist (Cake, Deathray)
- February 9 – Garland Green, 83, soul singer and pianist
- February 11 – Jerry Kennedy, 85, producer, songwriter, guitarist
- February 14 – Tim Very, 42, rock drummer (Manchester Orchestra)
- February 15 – Wayne Proctor (We the People)
- February 16 – Billy Steinberg, 75, songwriter
- February 18 – Lil Poppa, 25, rapper
- February 21 – Willie Colón, 75, salsa musician
- February 22 – Luci4, 23, rapper, songwriter, producer
- February 23 –
  - Sondra Lee, 97, musical actress and dancer
  - Monti Rock III, 86, singer (Disco-Tex and the Sex-O-Lettes)
- February 24 – Oliver "Power" Grant, 55, producer
- February 27 –
  - Neil Sedaka, 86, pop singer and songwriter
  - Travis Wammack, 81, rock and roll guitarist
- February 28 – John P. Hammond, 83, blues singer and guitarist
- March 1 –
  - Bob Power, 74, record producer and audio engineer
  - Gary Walker, 83, singer and percussionist (The Standells, The Walker Brothers)
- March 3 – Roy Book Binder, 82, blues musician
- March 5 – Lee Turner, 89, musician, (The Dream Weavers)
- March 7 –
  - David Brigati, 85, singer (Joey Dee and the Starliters, The Rascals).
  - Country Joe McDonald, 84, singer (Country Joe and the Fish) and songwriter
- March 9 –
  - Tommy DeCarlo, 60, singer (Boston, DECARLO)
  - Augie Meyers, 85, musician (Sir Douglas Quintet, Texas Tornados)
- March 10 – Willie Anthony Waters, 74, opera conductor
- March 14 – Paul Geremia, 81, blues singer and acoustic guitarist
- March 16 – Wayne Perkins, 74, rock and R&B guitarist, singer, songwriter, session musician
- March 18 – Robert White, 89, tenor
- March 20 – Louie Louie, 63, singer and producer
- March 22 – Ronnie Bowman, 64, bluegrass singer, guitarist, and songwriter
- March 23 –
  - Jerry Dee Lewis, rapper (The Cold Crush Brothers)
  - Chip Taylor, 86, singer and songwriter
- March 25 – Dash Crofts, 87, soft-rock singer and songwriter (Seals & Crofts)
- March 26 – Ross the Boss, 72, guitarist (The Dictators, Manowar)
- March 27 – Jon Dee Graham, 67, musician, guitarist, singer (The Skunks, True Believers)
- March 28 –
  - DJ Dan, 57, house music DJ and producer
  - Matt Krupanski, drummer (BoySetsFire)
- March 29 –
  - Greg Elmore, 79, drummer (The Brogues, Quicksilver Messenger Service)
  - Williametta Spencer, 86, composer
- March 30 –
  - Carl Bonafede, 85, musician and band manager (The Buckinghams, Daughters of Eve)
  - Walt Maddox, 88, singer (The Marcels)
  - Christopher North, 75, keyboardist and session musician (Ambrosia)
- April 2 –
  - James Gadson, 86, drummer (Charles Wright & the Watts 103rd Street Rhythm Band)
  - Bo Lueders, 38, guitarist (Harm's Way)
- April 3 – Fred Lite, 74, singer (The Chi-Lites, The Lost Generation)
- April 5 – Donn Landee, 79, producer and recording engineer
- April 6 – Blondy, 66, rapper (The Sequence)
- April 9 – Afrika Bambaataa, 68, DJ, rapper, record producer
- April 10 – Harry Kim, 74, trumpeter (The Phenix Horns)
- April 14 – Dan Wall, 72, jazz organist and pianist
- April 16 – Don Schlitz, 73, songwriter and musician
- April 20 – Alan Osmond, 76, pop and country singer (The Osmonds)
- May 22 – Rob Base, 59, rapper (Rob Base & DJ E-Z Rock)
- June 14 – Oliver Tree, 32, alternative rock singer, songwriter and rapper
- June 17 – Walter Parazaider, 81, rock guitarist and woodwind musician (Chicago)
- June 18 –
  - Tay Keith, 29, hip-hop record producer
  - Justin Cary, 50, rock bassist (Sixpence None the Richer)
- June 22 – Clive Davis, 94, music executive and record producer
- June 30 – Victor Willis, 74, R&B singer and songwriter (Village People)
- July 18 – Jennifer Finch, 59, rock bassist (L7)
- July 24 – Lou Koller, 59, punk rock singer (Sick of It All, Blood from the Soul)
- August 16 – Hayden Panettiere, 36, singer and actress
- August 17 – Frank Beard, 77, rock drummer (ZZ Top)
- August 22 – Shelley Fabares, 82, singer and actress
- August 25 – Dolly Parton, 80, country music singer, songwriter, actress
- September 1 – Cassandra Wilson, 70, jazz singer, songwriter and producer
- September 5 – Andy Williams, 48, rock guitarist (Every Time I Die)
- September 18 – Duncan Sheik, 56, rock and pop singer, songwriter and composer
- September 20 – Chad Gilbert, 45, rock guitarist and singer (New Found Glory, Shai Hulud, International Superheroes of Hardcore)
- October 5 – Freddie Jackson, 70, R&B singer and songwriter
