= Loudmouth =

Loudmouth(s) may refer to:

== Music ==
- Loudmouth (band), an American rock band
- Loudmouth (The Boomtown Rats album)
- Loudmouth (Jim Bianco album)
- Loudmouth (Vial album)
- "Loudmouth", a song from the album Ramones by the Ramones

== Other uses ==
- The Loud Mouth, a 1932 short comedy film
- Loudmouths, a New York sports-debate TV show
- Loudmouth Golf, an American sportswear company
