= Watch Dis! =

Studio album by Yung Miami
- Released: October 23, 2026
- Genre: Hip-hop
- Length: 57:13
- Label: Uptown Records
- Producers: Arsenio Archer; BeatsByJuko; Bigg D; Boobie; Cainon Lamb; Cheeze Beatz; Derrick Milano; DJ Gumbo; Djimon; Duce; Go Grizzly; Honorable C.N.O.T.E.; Hoops; Isaiah Tejada; Israel T. Martin; J. White Did It; Jambo; Juppybeats; London on da Track; Louie Bandz; Nija; OG Parker; Oh Gosh Leotus; Roark Bailey; Sucuki; T. Romano; Tyleen; Yung Miami

Singles from Watch Dis!
- 1. "Spend Dat" Released: April 24, 2026; 2. "2008 / F You" Released: October 1, 2026

Watch Dis! is the debut solo studio album by American rapper Yung Miami. It was released on October 23, 2026, through Uptown Records. The album consists of 21 tracks and features guest appearances from Travis Scott, Summer Walker, Quavo, G Herbo, Rick Ross, Trina, Trick Daddy, Bryson Tiller, Pleasure P, Lil Baby, Kodak Black, Davido, Shenseea, and Vybz Kartel, among others. The album followed the dissolution of Yung Miami's hip-hop duo City Girls, which she formed with rapper JT. Its lead single, "Spend Dat", preceded the album's release.

== Background and development ==
Following the release of their third studio album, RAW (2023), hip-hop duo City Girls, consisting of Yung Miami and JT, disbanded in 2024 to pursue solo careers. Yung Miami attributed the split to the album's commercial underperformance and their growing individual interests. During her tenure with the duo, she also established herself as a media personality through her interview series Caresha Please, which premiered in 2022 and won the BET Hip Hop Award for Best Hip Hop Platform in 2022 and 2023.

Yung Miami's early solo releases included "Rap Freaks" (2021), "50/50" (2024) and "CFWM" (2024), featuring Skilla Baby. In August 2024, she discussed difficulties releasing solo music, citing concerns from her label, Quality Control Music, about her artistic development. She continued releasing music in 2026, including the single "Spend Dat". On October 1, 2026, Yung Miami announced her debut solo studio album, Watch Dis!, alongside the singles "F You" and "2008".

== Critical reception ==
Watch Dis! received generally favorable reviews from music critics. AllMusic awarded the album four out of five stars, describing it as a collection of "high-energy, club-ready tracks" and highlighting Yung Miami's transition from City Girls to a solo recording career.

Writing for Pitchfork, Alphonse Pierre awarded the album a 6.7 out of 10, praising its Southern hip-hop influences and Miami's humorous lyricism. He described the album as "pretty fun", particularly commending "Put Together", "Dade County" and "Dear JT". However, Pierre criticized the excessive remixes of "Spend Dat", several guest appearances, and "Ride for You", a song dedicated to Sean Combs. He concluded that the album's enjoyable musical moments were overshadowed by its controversial subject matter.

== Track listing ==
Watch Dis! track listing
No.	Title	Length
1.	"Fck Shit Up (Intro)"	2:40
2.	"F You"	2:08
3.	"2008"	2:32
4.	"Spend Dat"	3:01
5.	"TMTC" (featuring Quavo and G Herbo)	3:24
6.	"Blink Twice"	2:58
7.	"Put Together (Interlude)"	0:28
8.	"Put Together"	2:50
9.	"Dade County" (featuring Rick Ross, Trina and Trick Daddy)	4:08
10.	"Freak Like Me (Interlude)"	1:07
11.	"Freak Like Me"	2:11
12.	"Just Might Go" (with Travis Scott)	3:32
13.	"Old Time Sake" (featuring Bryson Tiller)	2:29
14.	"Letter to My Mwah (Interlude)"	0:40
15.	"Letter to My Mwah"	3:16
16.	"Baby" (featuring Pleasure P)	3:31
17.	"Ride for You" (with Summer Walker)	3:10
18.	"Chasing Sunsets"	2:24
19.	"Dear JT"	3:12
20.	"Spend Dat (Remix)" (featuring Lil Baby and Kodak Black)	3:14
21.	"Spend Dat (International Remix)" (featuring Davido, Shenseea and Vybz Kartel)	4:18
Total length:		57:13

== Personnel ==
Credits are adapted from Qobuz, Universal Music Group metadata, and published album credits.

- Caresha Brownlee – lead vocals (all tracks)
- Quavo – guest vocals (5)
- G Herbo – guest vocals (5)
- Rick Ross – guest vocals (9)
- Trina – guest vocals (9)
- Trick Daddy – guest vocals (9)
- Saucy Santana – spoken vocals (7)
- Travis Scott – guest vocals (12)
- Bryson Tiller – guest vocals (13)
- Pleasure P – guest vocals (16)
- Summer Walker – guest vocals (17)
- Lil Baby – guest vocals (20)
- Kodak Black – guest vocals (20)
- Davido – guest vocals (21)
- Shenseea – guest vocals (21)
- Vybz Kartel – guest vocals (21)
- London on da Track – production (2, 13, 16, 17)
- J. White Did It – production (3, 4, 12, 16, 20, 21)
- Cheeze Beatz – production (1, 5, 8, 9)
- Go Grizzly – production (2, 8, 9)
- JUKO – production (2, 13, 17)
- Boobie – production (2, 17)
- Louie Bandz – production (1)
- Juppybeats – production (1)
- Duce – production (5)
- Derrick Milano – production (6)
- Djimon – production (6)
- Jambo – production (8)
- Honorable C.N.O.T.E. – production (11)
- Cainon Lamb – production (15)
- Bigg D – production (15)
- OG Parker – production (18)
- T. Romano – production (18)
- Hoops – production (18)
- Isaiah Tejada – production (18)
- Nija – production (18)
- DJ Gumbo – production (19)
- Isaac "Soundsfromikey" Copeland – recording engineering (18 tracks)
- Sauce Miyagi – mixing (4)
- Ohad Nissim – mastering (4)

== Charts ==
Chart performance for Watch Dis!
Chart (2026)	Peak position
US Billboard 200	138
US Top R&B/Hip-Hop Albums (Billboard)	47
