= Altogether Stranger =

Studio album by Lael Neale
- Released: May 2, 2025
- Genre: Rock
- Length: 32:06
- Label: Sub Pop
- Producer: Guy Blakeslee

Lael Neale chronology
Star Eaters Delight (2023)	Altogether Stranger (2025)

Singles from Altogether Stranger
- 1. "Tell Me How to Be Here" Released: February 20, 2025

Altogether Stranger is the fourth studio album by American indie rock musician Lael Neale. It was released on May 2, 2025, by Sub Pop Records.

== Background ==
The first album since Star Eaters Delight in 2023, Altogether Stranger consists of nine tracks with a total runtime of approximately thirty-two minutes. The lead single, "Tell Me How to Be Here", was released on February 20, 2025, alongside a music video directed by Neale and Guy Blakeslee, following the announcement of the album. Neale, discussing her time on a farm in Virginia during the COVID-19 pandemic in an interview with Under the Radar, described the album as her "reaction to being back in the city again but more in an aggravated way."

== Reception ==
Professional ratings
Review scores
Source	Rating
AllMusic	4.5/5 stars
Mojo	4/5 stars

AllMusic rated the album four stars and remarked, "With this album, Neale manages to translate existential torment into strange and beautiful sounds, yet again progressing with the chimerical vision of rock & roll that's uniquely her own." John Aizlewood of Mojo assigned it a rating of four out of five, stating "It's hardly a career fork, but Altogether Stranger is a significant upgrade," and describing the songs as "dystopian but hopeful, image-drenched."

== Track listing ==
All tracks are written by Lael Neale.

Altogether Stranger track listing
No.	Title	Length
1.	"Wild Waters"	2:57
2.	"All Good Things Will Come to Pass"	3:09
3.	"Down on the Freeway"	4:58
4.	"Sleep Through the Long Night"	1:59
5.	"Come On"	2:39
6.	"Tell Me How to Be Here"	5:33
7.	"New Ages"	4:27
8.	"All Is Never Lost"	3:30
9.	"There From Here"	2:54
Total length:		32:06

== Personnel ==
Credits adapted from the album's liner notes.

- Lael Neale – performance, illustrations
- Guy Blakeslee – performance, production, engineering, arrangements, mixing
- Chris Coady – mastering
- Ian Ritter – cover photo
- Raina Selene – inner sleeve photo
