= Where We've Been, Where We Go from Here =

Studio album by Friko
- Released: February 16, 2024
- Genre: Indie rock
- Length: 36:04
- Label: ATO Records
- Producer: Friko, Scott Tallarida

Friko chronology
Where We've Been, Where We Go from Here (2024)	Something Worth Waiting For (2026)

Singles from Where We've Been, Where We Go from Here
- 1. "Crashing Through" Released: November 14, 2023; 2. "For Ella" Released: December 5, 2023; 3. "Where We've Been" Released: January 16, 2024

Where We've Been, Where We Go from Here is the debut studio album by the American rock duo Friko, released on February 16, 2024, through ATO Records. The album was promoted with the singles "Crashing Through", "For Ella" and "Where We've Been". The album received generally positive reviews from critics.

== Release, recording and promotion ==
Friko announced the album on November 14, 2023, and released the lead single for the album, "Crashing Through". This was followed by "For Ella" on December 5, 2023 and "Where We've Been" on January 16, 2024. The album was highly anticipated, with both Pitchfork and Stereogum naming it in their lists of the most anticipated albums of 2024.

The band members described the time until the release of the album as a "very slow build". They recorded the album at a rehearsal spot in West Town, during their free time when they were not working. The band cited The Microphones, The Beach Boys, Mitski, Modest Mouse, Leonard Cohen, Philip Glass, Finom, Lomelda, Yeah Yeah Yeahs and mewithoutYou as the ten biggest influences on the album.

One of the main things we want to do as a band is talk about what's happening right now and everything we're feeling, with an honesty and directness that gets through to people. I hope that our music helps everyone feel more deeply, but in a way that goes beyond just reacting to the songs. I want it to pick people up, so that they can actually go out and do something with whatever they're feeling.

— Vocalist/guitarist, Niko Kapetan on the album

To promote the album, the band appeared at Reckless Records and Shuga Records in Chicago on release day, followed by a sold-out release party at the Metro concert hall, multiple appearances at South by Southwest, and touring in support of Willis, Water From Your Eyes, and Mind's Eye. NME gave a positive review for one of their live performances, additionally praising the album.

== Reception ==
Professional ratings
Aggregate scores
Source	Rating
Metacritic	86/100
Review scores
Source	Rating
AllMusic	4/5 stars
Pitchfork	7.9/10
Paste	8.9/10
Spin	A

Where We've Been, Where We Go From Here received generally positive reviews. At Metacritic, the album received an average score of 86 based on 6 reviews, indicating "universal acclaim". Ian Cohen of Pitchfork said that the album "carries the spirit forward, reaffirming that indie rock, as a style and ethos, can still feel like the most exciting thing a young person could be into". Ben Salmon of Spin said that Friko's music "is dynamic and ambitious in a way that separates them from their more austere peers" and likened them to Radiohead, Arcade Fire and Bright Eyes going on to call the album "a giant step in that path of greatness" in a similar vein to those bands. Ryan Reed of Relix had a similar opinion, calling the record a "pure catnip for diary-toting indie-heads, echoing giants like Bright Eyes and Elliott Smith while never coming off as obvious as derivative." Grace Ann Natanawan of Paste said that Friko "craft music of pure feeling" and described the album as "stunning". Leor Galil of Chicago Reader also gave a positive review, writing "I hope Where We've Been, Where We Go From Here will launch Friko into a pantheon of great contemporary Chicago bands—and it should definitely reinvigorate your love of rock."

Several critics praised the range of the album, with Marcy Donelson of Allmusic saying that the album "oscillates between desperate ballads and cathartic rockers with memorable choruses". Ben Salmon of Spin similarly opined that the band "bounce effortlessly from fragile ballads to punk rippers to chamber-pop crescendos, somehow both fully in control and barely holding it together", Grace Ann Natanawan of Paste echoed the sentiment, stating that "The album moves at an unexpected pace, transitioning from visceral high-energy tracks to subdued ballads seamlessly". Ian Cohen of Pitchfork felt that the album was less of a "monolithic statement of purpose" and more of a "presumptive greatest-hits compilation", additionally stating that "It's no slight to say that it could be just as enjoyable on shuffle".

The album was named one of "9 New Albums You Should Listen To Now" by Pitchfork. Consequence selected the album as one of the best of February 2024. The song Get Numb to It! was chosen as a potential song of the year by All Songs Considered. The song was also chosen as "Today's Top Tune" by KCRW.

== Track listing ==
No.	Title	Length
1.	"Where We've Been"	5:15
2.	"Crimson to Chrome"	3:28
3.	"Crashing Through"	3:43
4.	"For Ella"	4:03
5.	"Chemical"	3:22
6.	"Statues"	3:54
7.	"Until I'm With You Again"	3:33
8.	"Get Numb to It!"	4:52
9.	"Cardinal"	3:54
