= Burnout (EP) =

burnout

EP by VIAL
- Released: March 29, 2024
- Studios: Minnehaha Recording Company, Minneapolis, Minnesota, US
- Genres: Indie rock; punk rock
- Length: 19:07
- Language: English
- Label: Get Better Records
- Producer: Hansel Romero

VIAL chronology
| apathy (2024) | burnout (2024) | DIY Or Die (2024) |

VIAL studio album chronology
| LOUDMOUTH (2021) | burnout (2024) | Grow The Fuck Up (2024) |

Singles from burnout
- 1. "therapy part. iii" Released: October 18 2023; 2. "just fine" Released: October 18 2023; 3. "ur dad" Released: November 18 2023; 4. "falling short" Released: January 17 2024; 5. "apathy" Released: February 13 2024

Burnout is an extended play by American punk rock band Vial, released 29 March 2024 through Get Better Records.

== Track listing ==
All lyrics are written by Taylor Kraemer, KT Branscom, Katie Fischer.

| No. | Title | Vocals | Length |
|---|---|---|---|
| 1. | "two-faced" | Branscom | 3:13 |
| 2. | "falling short" | Kraemer | 1:30 |
| 3. | "bottle blonde" | Fischer | 3:00 |
| 4. | "broth song" | Branscom | 1:21 |
| 5. | "chronic illness flareups" | | 0:37 |
| 6. | "therapy part. iii" | Branscom, Fischer | 0:42 |
| 7. | "just fine" | Branscom | 1:59 |
| 8. | "friendship bracelet" | Kraemer | 2:18 |
| 9. | "ur dad" | Kraemer | 1:44 |
| 10. | "apathy" | Branscom | 2:43 |
| Total length: | | | 19:07 |

== Personnel ==
Vial

- KT Branscom - Guitar and vocals
- Katie Fischer - Drums, vocals, auxiliary percussion (tracks 3, 6 and 7) and bass (track 3)
- Taylor Kraemer - Bass, synthesizer (tracks 3, 4 and 5) and vocals

Technical

- Mik Finnegan - Recording
- Forrest Hormann, Amaya Peña - Cover art and design
- Hansel Romero - Mixing, production, mastering

== See also ==
- 2024 in American music
- List of 2024 albums
