= Crown Magnetar =

American technical deathcore metal band

- Origin: Denver, Colorado, United States
- Genre: Deathcore
- Years active: 2016–present
- Label: Unique Leader
- Members: Rob Maramonte; Dan Tucker; Mike Sahm; Matt Kilner
- Past members: Nick Burnett; Grant Robinson; Jesse Camargo; Byron London

Crown Magnetar is an American deathcore band from Colorado.

They released their debut EP Alone In Death in 2022, followed by their first studio album Everything Bleeds the following year. In 2025, they put out their second EP, Punishment, via Unique Leader Records. They released their next studio album The Hollowing of Godflesh on September 25th 2026.

== Band Members ==
=== Current Members ===
- Rob Maramonte – Guitar (2025-Present)
- Dan Tucker – Vocals (2016-Present)
- Mike Sahm – Bass (2024-Present)
- Matt Kilner – Drums (2026-Present)

=== Former Members ===
- Nick Burnett – Guitar (2016-2025)
- Grant Robinson – Bass (2020-2024)
- Jesse Camargo – Bass (2016-2020)
- Byron London – Drums (2016-2026)

Timeline

== Discography ==
=== Albums ===
- The Codex of Flesh (2021)
- Everything Bleeds (2023)
- The Hollowing of Godflesh (2026)

=== EPs ===
- The Prophet of Disgust (2018)
- Alone in Death (2022)
- Punishment (2025)
