= Danielle Ponder =

American singer and lawyer

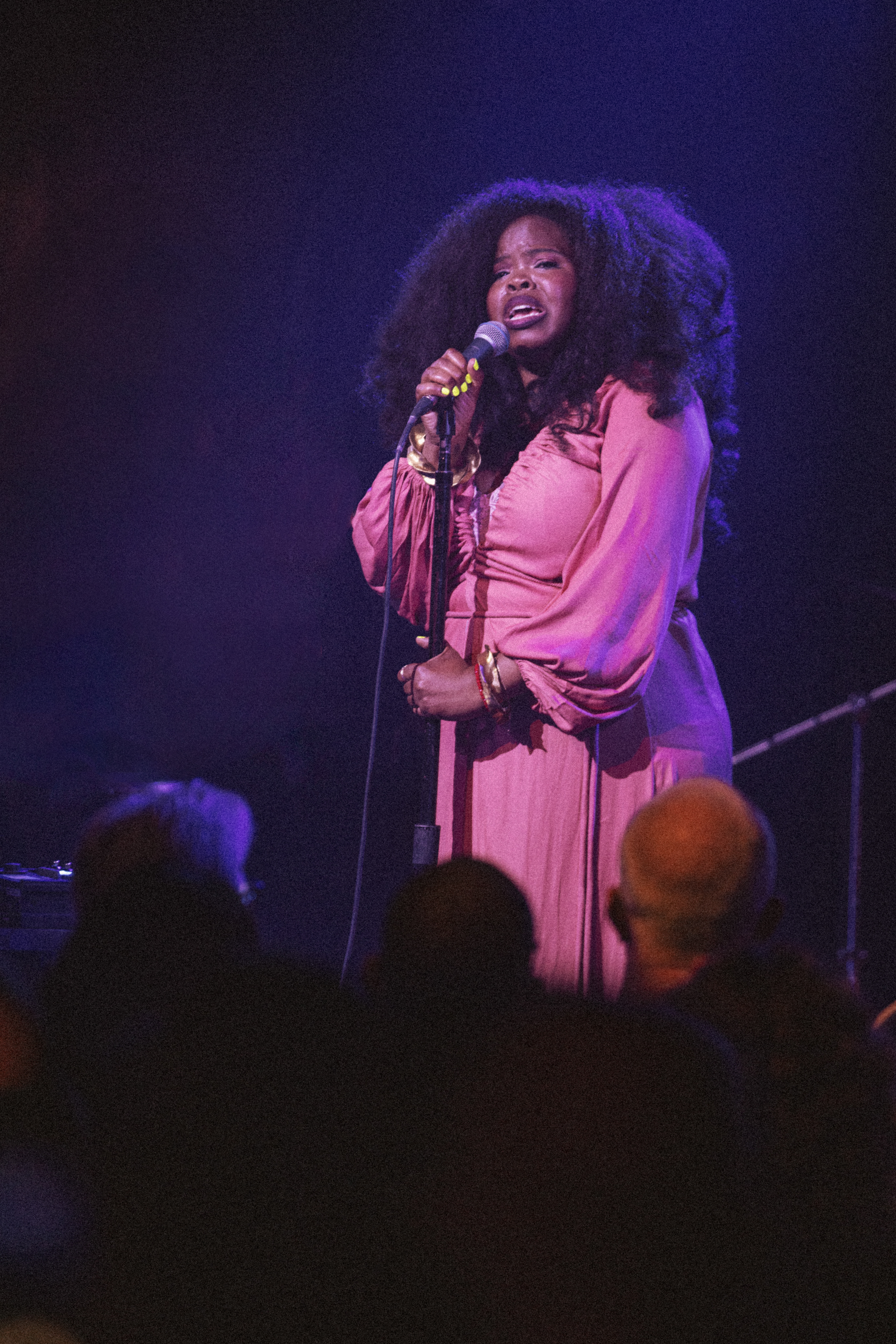
- Ponder at The Troubador in May 2023

Background information
- Born: January 5, 1982 (age 44); Rochester, New York, U.S.
- Genres: R&B; soul; trip hop
- Occupations: Singer; songwriter; producer; lawyer
- Years active: 2021–present
- Website: https://danielleponder.com/

Danielle Ponder is an American musician and lawyer. Before becoming a musician, she worked as a public defender. She released her debut album, Some of Us are Brave, in 2022.

== Early life ==
Ponder is from Rochester, New York and was born in 1982. At home, her father often played an instrument or sang. As a teenager, she received her first music equipment, a guitar, from her father.

== Career ==
=== Legal career ===
After college, Ponder attended law school at the Northeastern University School of Law, graduating with a Juris Doctor in 2011. Following this, she worked as a public defender in the Monroe County Public Defender's Office. In 2018, she pursued music but eventually returned to the legal field.

=== Music career ===
In December 2021, Ponder left her public defender position to pursue a career in music. In 2022, she performed on Late Night with Seth Meyers. In the fall of 2022, she released her debut album, Some of Us are Brave., which featured eight songs characterized as a mix of soul, R&B, and trip hop. In April 2023, she performed on General Hospital. In August 2023, she performed at Lollapalooza.

In September 2023, the deluxe edition of Some of Us are Brave was released, featuring one new song, a demo, three live recordings and a remix by Georgia Anne Muldrow. That new song, Roll the Credits, was later used by Apple in their iPhone 16 advertising campaign in October 2024. The song was also used in the end credits of Dragon Age: Veilguard.

Ponder wrote and performed the theme song for the 2024 Apple TV miniseries, Manhunt.

== Discography ==
=== Studio albums ===
- Some of Us Are Brave (2022)
- Everything Has Changed (2026)

=== Singles ===
- "Holding Me Down" (2019)
- "Creep (Live)" (2020)
- "Poor Man's Pain" (2020)
- "Be Gentle" (2020)
- "Look Around" // "Little Bit" (with Karate Boogaloo) (2020)
- "So Long" (2022)
- "The Only Way Out" (2022)
- "The Difficult Kind" (with Adrian Younge and Ali Shaheed Muhammad) (from Reasonable Doubt) (2022)
- "Spiraling" (2023)
- "Roll the Credits" (2023)
