= Something Worth Waiting For =

2026 studio album by Friko

Studio album by Friko
- Released: April 24, 2026
- Genre: Indie rock
- Length: 41:40
- Label: ATO
- Producer: John Congleton

Friko chronology
Where We've Been, Where We Go from Here (2024)	Something Worth Waiting For (2026)

Singles from Something Worth Waiting For
- 1. "Seven Degrees" Released: February 3, 2026; 2. "Choo Choo" Released: March 3, 2026; 3. "Still Around" Released: March 31, 2026; 4. "Something Worth Waiting For" Released: April 21, 2026

Something Worth Waiting For is the second studio album by the American rock band Friko, released on April 24, 2026, through ATO Records. The album was promoted with the singles "Seven Degrees", "Choo Choo", "Still Around", and "Something Worth Waiting For". The album received generally positive reviews from critics.

== Release, recording and promotion ==
Friko announced the album on February 3, 2026 and released the lead single "Seven Degrees" on the same day. This was followed by the single "Choo Choo" on March 3, 2026 and "Still Around" on March 31, 2026. The last single, "Something Worth Waiting For" was released on April 21, 2026. The album was highly anticipated, being listed on Stereogum's 200 most anticipated albums of 2026 and Pitchfork's 64 most anticipated albums of spring 2026.

The album was produced by John Congleton and recorded in his studio in Los Angeles. It is the first album to feature guitarist Korgan Robb and bassist David Fuller. Drummer Bailey Minzenberger revealed that Congleton allowed them to record "something very raw", rather than to get "involved in the technical aspect of everything" that had happened in their previous album.

The album was influenced by Friko's experiences touring and traveling. Vocalist and guitarist Niko Kapetan said that life and traveling were overarching influences on the record. Kapetan also stated that a major theme of the album was transit. The album features songs about different modes of transit, like trains, bicycles and hot air balloons. The song "Hot Air Balloon" was inspired by the band waking up in an Albuquerque Cracker Barrel parking lot and seeing the colorful balloons of Albuquerque International Balloon Fiesta, and the title of the record is referencing the idea of moving toward something one never quite reaches.

== Reception ==
Professional ratings
Aggregate scores
Source	Rating
Metacritic	79/100
Review scores
Source	Rating
AllMusic	4/5 stars
Exclaim!	9/10
NME	4/5 stars
Paste	A−
Pitchfork	7.8/10
PopMatters	6/10

According to the review aggregator Metacritic, Something Worth Waiting For received "generally favorable reviews" based on a weighted average score of 79 out of 100 from 14 critic scores. Grace Robins-Sommerville of Pitchfork reviewed the album positively, saying that it "unfurls like the long-awaited arrival of spring" and that the album "amps up the grandiosity and meticulous detail" in comparison to their debut. Marcy Donelson of AllMusic stated that the album was "even rawer and more rattled" than their debut and praised the volatility of the album. NME's Priya Elan praised the album as "a confident, seemingly effortless next step into the musical big leagues" but also noted that it felt like a warning from Kapetan to himself "to step off the brakes" before the band falls apart.

Thomas Britt of PopMatters described the choice of front loading the album with loud crowded songs "contradictory", considering the band's career and album were at a point where anticipation was "being thematized and dramatized". He further noted that the "torrents of emotion" in the opening song feel "undermotivated" because the mood is "so heightened" early "into the album", and praised songs such as "Certainty" and "Alice" for their more subdued nature in contrast to the other elements making it a more "maximalist album".

== Track listing ==
All lyrics are written by Niko Kapetan; all music is composed by Kapetan, except "Alice" (composed by Kapetan and Korgan Robb).

Something Worth Waiting For track listing
No.	Title	Length
1.	"Guess"	3:46
2.	"Still Around"	3:24
3.	"Choo Choo"	3:20
4.	"Alice"	4:15
5.	"Certainty"	5:27
6.	"Hot Air Balloon"	5:07
7.	"Seven Degrees"	4:15
8.	"Something Worth Waiting For"	5:54
9.	"Dear Bicycle"	6:10

== Personnel ==
Credits are adapted from Tidal.

=== Friko ===
- David Fuller – bass (tracks 1–4, 6–9), background vocals (2–4, 6–8), whistle (3)
- Niko Kapetan – vocals (all tracks), guitar (1–3, 6, 9), piano (4–6, 9), keyboards (4, 7), acoustic guitar (7, 8), electric guitar (8)
- Bailey Minzenberger – drums (1–4, 6–9), background vocals (2–4, 6–9), percussion (3, 4, 6–9), guitar (4), vocals (5), harmonium (6), slide guitar (7), harmonica (9)
- Korgan Robb – guitar (1–4, 6–9), background vocals (2–4, 6–8); Rhodes, synthesizer (9)

=== Additional contributors ===
- John Congleton – production, engineering, mixing
- Alex Bhore – engineering assistance
- Matt Colton – mastering
- Stas Slyvka – whistle (3)
