= Lael Neale =

American indie rock musician

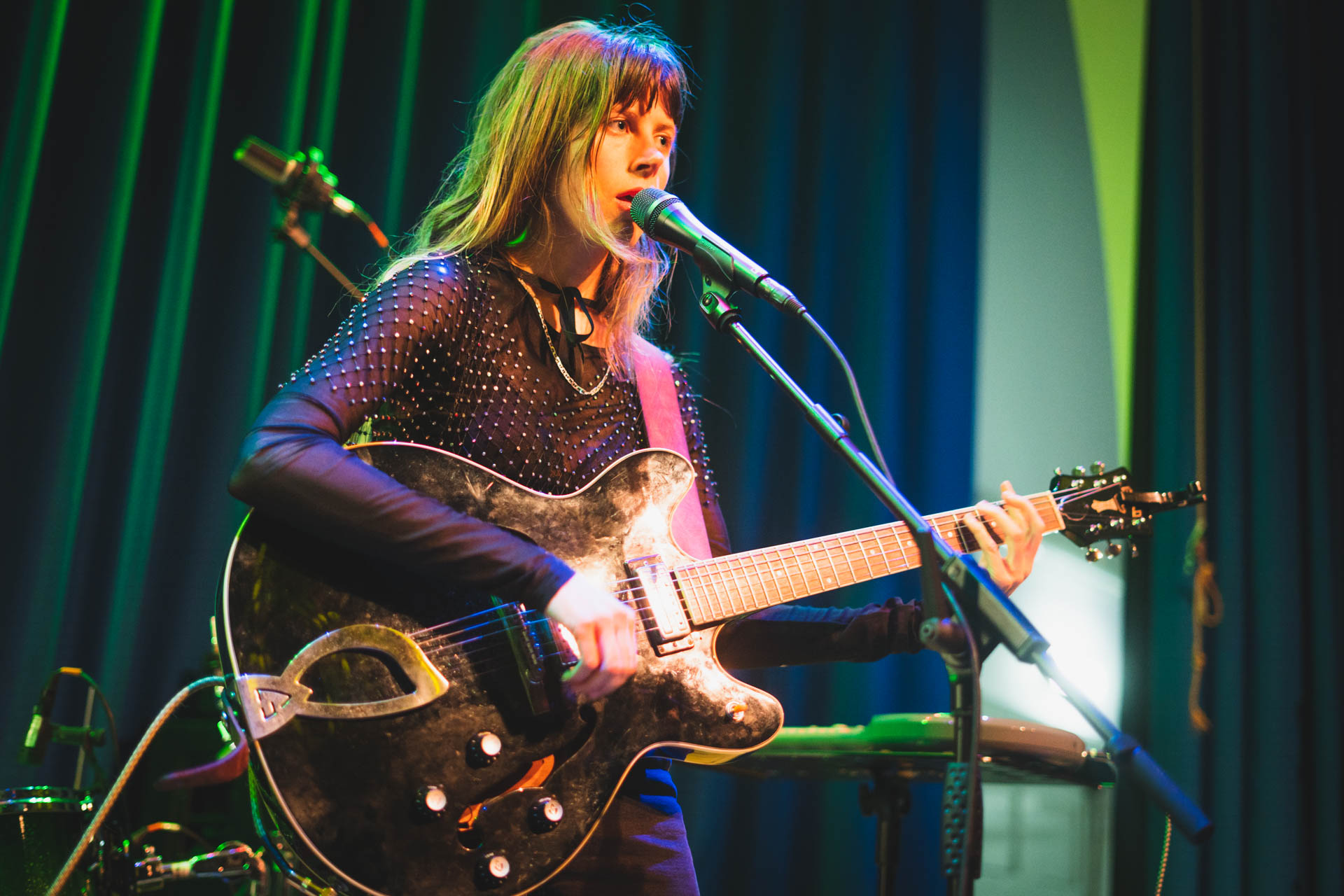
- Neale at the Great Escape Festival in 2023

Background information
- Born: Virginia, U.S.
- Genre: Indie rock
- Label: Sub Pop Consensual Sounds
- Website: laelneale.com

Lael Sinclair Neale is an American indie rock musician from Virginia.

== History ==
Neale is signed to Sub Pop Records. Neale has recorded five albums. Her first, I'll Be Your Man, was released in 2015 on Liberal Arts. Neale's second record, Acquainted With Night, was released in 2021 on Sub Pop. In 2022, Neale released her latest song titled "Hotline". It was named one of "The Best New Songs" by Paste magazine. Her third album, Star Eaters Delight, was issued in April 2023. Neale's fourth studio album, Altogether Stranger, was released on 2 May 2025. Her fifth album “As Killers Do” was released on 20 November 2026.

== Personal life ==
Neale was born on a farm in rural Virginia. In April 2020, Neale left Los Angeles at the start of the pandemic, returning to the family farm in Virginia. "Looking at the world from a distance and getting in tune with her own rhythms, she wrote and recorded steadily for two dreamlike years, driven by a need to make order out of chaos. Forged in isolation, Star Eaters Delight is a vehicle for returning, not just to civilization, but to celebration," according to bio section of her website.

== Discography ==
=== Studio albums ===
- I'll Be Your Man (2015)
- Acquainted With Night (2021)
- Star Eaters Delight (2023)
- Altogether Stranger (2025)
- As Killers Do (2026)
