= Autosmile =

Studio album by @
- Released: October 16, 2026
- Recorded: 2021–2026
- Genres: Chamber folk; psychedelic folk
- Length: 40:36
- Label: 4AD
- Producer: Stone Filipczak

@ chronology
| Are You There God? It's Me, @ (2024) | Autosmile (2026) |

Singles from Autosmile
- 1. "Autosmile" Released: June 24, 2026; 2. "Punish My Mind" Released: August 4, 2026; 3. "Bird" Released: September 15, 2026; 4. "I Know You Are (But What Am I Thinking)" Released: October 13, 2026

Autosmile is the second studio album by the American musical duo @, released on October 16, 2026, through 4AD. The eleven-track album marks the duo's first release with the label. It received universal acclaim from music critics.

== Background and singles ==
The Philadelphia-based duo, consisting of Victoria Rose and Stone Filipczak, developed the album by exchanging music files with one another. Recorded over a five-year period, Autosmile reflects on the changes in their lives since the release of their debut album, Mind Palace Music (2021), which had unintentionally taken on a darker tone than they had originally intended. After signing with 4AD ahead of the album's release, the duo adopted a recording approach that was "far less spontaneous" than that of their debut, aiming to bring their "most complete-sounding stuff" to the record.

Autosmile was announced on June 24, 2026, alongside the release of its title track as the lead single. The song was well received by critics and was named Best New Track by Pitchfork. Three further singles were released ahead of the album: "Punish My Mind" on August 4, "Bird" on September 15, and "I Know You Are (But What Am I Thinking)" on October 13, 2026.

== Critical reception ==
Autosmile ratings
Aggregate scores
| Source | Rating |
|---|---|
| Metacritic | 83/100 |
Review scores
| Source | Rating |
| Clash | 8/10 |
| Exclaim! | 9/10 |
| The Line of Best Fit | 7/10 |
| Paste | A– |
| Pitchfork | 8.6/10 |
| Uncut | 3.5/5 stars |

According to the review aggregator Metacritic, Autosmile received "universal acclaim" based on a weighted average score of 83 out of 100 from 8 critic scores.

Sophie Kemp of Pitchfork awarded the album the publication's Best New Music distinction, describing it as "psychedelic freak folk" and likening the listening experience to "pressing your face up against the window of a train". She characterized the music as "incredibly grounded" and "lived-in", concluding that it "is a special record" that encourages listeners to "examine" their own lives.

In another highly positive review for Paste, Elise Soutar praised the duo for "never sounding indebted" to the artists who pioneered chamber folk, instead finding their own way of approaching the genre. She added that once listeners become immersed in the album's sound, there is "no urge to untangle yourself".

Taking a more critical view of the album, Janne Oinonen of The Line of Best Fit felt that the duo "try just a bit too hard to add edge", although they still considered it "generally a very good album", adding that @ were "on the brink of greatness".

== Track listing ==
All tracks are written by Victoria Rose and Stone Filipczak.

Autosmile track listing
| No. | Title | Length |
|---|---|---|
| 1. | "Bird" | 3:22 |
| 2. | "Love in the Dark" | 4:18 |
| 3. | "I Know You Are (But What Am I Thinking)" | 2:52 |
| 4. | "Earthly Love" | 3:29 |
| 5. | "Your Dog" | 2:11 |
| 6. | "Untitled" | 3:32 |
| 7. | "I'm Not in Pain" | 5:02 |
| 8. | "Punish My Mind" | 3:04 |
| 9. | "Judgement Farmer" | 3:33 |
| 10. | "Autosmile" | 6:39 |
| 11. | "Amity" | 2:34 |
| Total length: | | 40:36 |

== Personnel ==
These credits are adapted from the album's liner notes and Tidal.

=== @ ===
- Victoria Rose – engineering, vocals, guitar, keyboard, clarinet
- Stone Filipczak – engineering, production, mixing, vocals, guitar, keyboard, bass, programming, saz, flute, percussion

=== Additional contributors ===
- Nino Soberon – cello (tracks 4, 6 and 7), backing vocals (tracks 6 and 7)
- Nina Ryser – backing vocals (track 4)
- Andy Loebs – electric bass (track 7)
- Garrett Burke – drums (track 7)
- Will Henriksen – violin (track 3)
- Lucas Knapp – additional engineering (tracks 4 and 10)
- Kevin Keenan – additional engineering (track 7)
- Joe Lambert – mastering
- Sam Klickner – artwork
