= @ (band) =

American folk pop duo

@ (pronounced "at") is an American folk pop duo consisting of Stone Filipczak and Victoria Rose.

== History ==
The duo began sharing ideas with each other virtually in the spring of 2020, during the COVID-19 pandemic. The duo continued sharing ideas and songs together virtually, mostly through voice notes and short snippets on iMessage, which led to the making of their debut album, Mind Palace Music. In 2022, the duo announced they were signing to Washington, D.C.–based record label Carpark Records, who were going to re-release their debut album. Treble Zine named it one of the "12 Great Albums You Might Have Missed from Winter 2023". In 2024, @ released an EP titled Are You There God? It's Me, @ through Carpark Records. On June 24th, 2026, @ announced their second studio album, Autosmile, and on the same day released the album's title track, "Autosmile". The album was released through 4AD on October 16, 2026.

== Discography ==
Studio albums

- Mind Palace Music (2021, self-released; 2023, Carpark Records)
- Autosmile (2026, 4AD)

EPs

- Are You There God? It's Me, @ (2024, Carpark Records)
