= K. Sparks =

American musician

- Born: Kyle Hunter; Queens, New York, United States
- Genre: Hip hop
- Occupations: Rapper; songwriter; businessman
- Instrument: Vocals
- Years active: 1993–present
- Labels: Universal Music Group; Sony; IODA; Fat Beats Records; Double Up Entertainment
- Website: ksparksmusic.com

Kyle Hunter known under his stage name as K. Sparks, is an American hip hop musician, and ghostwriter. He started making hip hop music in 1993, while he has since released various studio albums, with several nationwide releases including, Definition (2008), Tomorrow Today (2011), Read Between The Lines (2012), Self-Portrait (2013), Vintage Art (2014), The Blue Tape 2 (2014), Seasons Theme (2016) Urban Couture (2017), Note to Self (2018), Pressure Is A Privilege (2026). He has worked with artist such as The Temptations, Kid Cudi, Sabina Ddumba, Ahmad (rapper), Joell Ortiz, DJ Envy, The Pharcyde, Radio Personality for Hot 97 Peter Rosenberg, Jarren Benton, Loaded Lux, Nick Cannon, and Rapsody from the Kendrick Lamar album To Pimp a Butterfly.

K. Sparks has performed at various venues and festivals with several artist including Kendrick Lamar, Kanye West, Joe Budden, Talib Kweli, Sean Price, and Q Tip. He was featured in the Unsigned Hype column of the January/February 2010 issue of The Source magazine. K. Sparks owns Double Up Entertainment, a music production, licensing, and branding company. In 2009 K. Sparks was nominated for the Best New Artist (Unsigned/Independent) and won first place. The same year K. Sparks and Wiz Khalifa were both nominated for the Best Hip Hop Record (Unsigned/Independent).

== Early life and background ==
Kyle Hunter was born in Queens, New York. His father is an African-American former soldier for the U.S. Air Force, and Jazz Musician. His mother was an African-American school teacher who worked for the New York City Board of education. His mother was a graduate of Harvard University and instilled the value of education within the household. During his youth, Sparks expressed an affinity for drawing and later received an award to attend Cooper Union College for Architecture. When asked about how going to school for art impacted him, in an interview Sparks commented "It was different. It made me more well rounded to be around so many different races and cultures. Broadened my perspective". He started freestyle rapping when he was thirteen years old and performing at various shows in New York City. As his notoriety increased K. Sparks garnered the attention of Nick Cannon, that signed K. Sparks to record for his Wild Style Champs album. He proceeded to create his own company, Double Up Entertainment, started in 2005, with it being incorporated in Delaware. His mother died from breast cancer in 2013. His brother's dead body was found at a hotel in Queens New York in 2015.

== Music career ==
K. Sparks has released 100 mixtapes, during his music career since 1993, and he has released various studio albums, with seven nationwide releases. His major hip hop music recording career began in 2008 with the release of the album Definition produced by Pajozo featuring Kanye West' artist Kid Cudi. The album was released to critical acclaim with over 26,300 downloads. His popularity increased after the single release "Take Em High" went viral and led to him being contacted by an A&R from Steve Rifkin SRC Records, a division of Universal Music Group. He started ghost writing and referencing music for several recording artists while creating his own albums. Receiving numerous beat productions from Bad Boy Records Producer EZ Elpee, K. Sparks wrote and referenced several songs and hooks that were shopped to Sony Music. While generating attention from writing and significant industry buzz, A&R RussPrez signed K. Sparks to a recording contract with IODA, a division of Sony Music to record and release his album entitled Hip Hop 101. He further cemented his work ethic with a weekly series Manic Mondays in which he recorded and released a new original song every Monday for an entire year. After years of securing music placements, he signed a recording contract with Fat Beats Records to release his album Tomorrow Today produced by Pajozo, released April 5, 2011, featuring Warner Bros recording artist Sabina Ddumba. The album received critical acclaim and was the first album reviewed by Dead End Hip Hop. The album further received 4/5 spins from DJ Booth staff writer Nathan S stating "Now, more than ever, the correlation between being signed and making dope music, which the last time I checked was the actual point of all of this, is tenuous at best. Independent, major, slept on, overrated, whatever. I'm not worries about labels (pun intended), I'm only worried about listening to as much K. Sparks as possible. I suggest you do the same". Exclaim Magazine writer Mark Bozzer noted "This able MC showcases his versatile flow and diverse taste in beats. If he keeps moving in this direction, K. Sparks most certainly will attain what he's striving for tomorrow, today. (Double Up)". K. Sparks received another recording contract with HiPNOTT Records for a two-album deal. He then recorded A Day in the Life, and A Day in the Life Kurser Remix Suite both featuring Duck Down Music recording artist Sean Price. Then in 2013, with the studio album, Self-Portrait, that was released on July 2, 2013. The subsequent studio album, Vintage Art, was released on August 23, 2014. The Blue Tape 2 was released on February 20, 2014. He released Seasons Theme on February 26, 2016.

== Manic Mondays ==
During the heightened digital era of blogs (2008–2009) K. Sparks created a series entitled Manic Mondays. Every Monday for an entire year he released an original song to the internet. In a previous interview Sparks stated "I want to push boundaries. Most artist are using unoriginal mixtape beats. I'm using original production from talented producers". The series was initially launched exclusively on DJ Booth, however quickly became critically acclaimed and picked up by several online websites, 2DOPEBOYZ, HipHopDX, okayplayer, AllHipHop, and hundreds of others. Producers that contributed production to K. Sparks songs for the Manic Mondays series include Mark Henry (credits: Fabolous, Fat Joe, Raekwon, Wale, The Game, Cam'ron) Kurser (credits: The Pharcyde) Fero Navi (credits: Jim Jones, Substantial) T-Mos (credits: illmind) DJ Bobby Bob, Pajozo, Moe Productions, D Roof, Dave Barz, Big Drew and several others. In conclusion of the series on week 52 he created a song entitled 10 Minutes. Rapping for ten minutes over three different beats discussing various topics. In total Manic Mondays amassed over 525,000 digital downloads.

== Ghost writing ==
K. Sparks was scouted and signed by a Music Agent in 2012 to create original content for mainstream commercial placements. Creating content for movies, commercials, and television while building his music catalogue. When asked to disclose clients he has written for in a 2016 Interview with NRT he stated "Contractually I can't disclose that information, but I can discuss the approach. It's like writing a cinematic screenplay. Each character has to encompass their own dynamic, so when I'm writing I take that perspective head-on; how can I make this musician genuinely have his or her own voice within this content". K. Sparks continued to elaborate in regards to the creative approach when writing music for mainstream placements behind the scenes "It's really how I prefer to conduct business, low-key and in the background. Some people have to be in the forefront, but that's not my style. That aspect of business allows me to work behind the scenes while retaining content ownership. The product placement advertising is essentially a business card. When people hear my songs in Lebron James or Forever 21 commercials it spreads the message". He continues to work behind the scenes with artist, movie directors, and mainstream brands such as Monster Energy, Powerade, Forever 21, LeBron James, and several others.

== Trendy, and Black Cassette ==
On October 1, 2016, K. Sparks released a single entitled #TRENDY. In the song he addressed the extreme racial tension in the United States after numerous incidents of Police brutality. Discussing several acts of violence that involved Trayvon Martin, Mike Brown, Eric Garner and others. The song received notoriety from various mainstream digital outlets. HipHopDX staff writer wrote "K. Sparks utilized symbolism as a method to create positive dialogue and change". January 1, 2017, K. Sparks released a 3-song EP entitled Black Cassette Produced By Kurser from Paris. The EP received numerous praises from critics and was featured on 2dopeboyz. The second song on the Black Cassette entitled "Level Up (Street Fam)" contained song lyrics K. Sparks directed towards an unknown musician. In an interview with WLUW 88.7 FM K. Sparks elaborated in regards to the song "I wrote those lyrics for an artist I use to ghost write hooks for. I don't give negative people promotion so I left the name out. But they know who the record is for."

== Urban Couture ==
On June 15, 2015, K. Sparks teamed up with producer Es-K to start work on his album entitled Urban Couture. The album's first single entitled Flipside was released on August 6, 2017. The album was made available for pre order with a release date set for October 15, 2017. K. Sparks handled the majority of the writing and some production, while Es-K handled the majority of production duties. In regards to the promotional campaign for the album, the following was cited; Flipside is the first single from K. Sparks collaborative album with producer Es-K entitled Urban Couture. The song discusses the various positive and always negative alternatives in life. But most importantly always placing things into perspective. Es-K, Ezeroh1 and K. Sparks produced this song, in addition to John Culbreth playing trumpet. The album took two years to complete due to containing live instrumentation from various musicians from several locations. Fusions of Jazz, Neo soul & Hip-Hop can all be traced within various layers of the project.

Urban Couture Track-List

1. Flipside
2. Blue Notalgia (feat. Stephanie Heaghney)
3. Pen Griffey
4. Strip 4 Me
5. Da Homie E
6. Make America Fake Again (feat. Nation)
7. Feeling' Away
8. Urban Couture
9. Greatness Is Complicated/U Say (feat. Amelia Wilcox)
10. June (Interlude)
11. Happily Never After
12. Summer in September (feat. Stephanie Heaghney)
13. Sunken Place/Juneteenth

== Note to Self ==
K. Sparks and French beat-smith Kurser teamed up to release their collaborative 2018 album entitled Note to Self. The album's first single entitled Questions was released on August 4, 2018. The entire album was produced by Kurser, and K. Sparks composed all of the songs including the hooks sang by other artists. The album was released to critical acclaim receiving a review of 4.5 out of 5 on the Music website Sputnik Music. The album reviewer stated "Spark's gift is not just that he can rap, but he is able to inject realism. The song Side Effects hits hard with “I'm just conversating about' my life, I don't make rap". The simplistic guitar loop combined with whistling crafted by Kurser provide the perfect landscape for his conversational introspective raps. He has the ability to intrigue the listener combining strength and pain with the same intensity, and it's that ability that makes him such a massive force. Listening to Note to Self is like watching a game at the Rucker in Harlem. You quickly recognize this is a talent meant to compete on the big stage. Every line from Sparks is like Curry and Harden, he misses nothing. "I got a harder job than Donald Trump publicist," he raps with ease. Note to Self is a brilliant combination of the timeless and the modern, the old school and the new school combined. A talented rapper that continues to display his greatness while mastering his mental notes to self."

Note to Self Track-List

1. Say Less
2. April in Paris (feat. Leslie Carron)
3. Systematic
4. Standoffish
5. Strip 4 Me
6. Side Effects
7. Questions
8. Autumn in New York
9. Already Gone
10. Close 2 Me
11. Make Believe
12. Moonlight Drive
13. Addicted To Self
14. Journal Entry 14 (Interlude)
15. Note To Self
16. G.O.M.F.
17. Less Is More

== The Temptations ==
K. Sparks collaborated with Universal Records recording artists The Temptations on their 60th anniversary album entitled 60. The song was entitled "Let It Reign" and released January 28, 2022. The album also featured legend Smokey Robinson on the single "Is it gonna be yes or no". The album was released to critical acclaim.

== Diagnosis Success Podcast ==
Kyle Hunter known under his stage name K. Sparks, launched The Diagnosis Success Podcast. The Diagnosis Success Podcast launched on March 14, 2021 with the first episode being entitled AYC (Assessing Your Circle). The Podcast is listened to on a global scale across all streaming platforms such as Apple Podcasts, Spotify, Google Podcasts, Deezer, Radio Public + many more. The podcast focuses on self improvement while providing tools to help individuals succeed on a personal and business level.

== Pressure Is A Privilege ==
On August 1, 2026, K. Sparks announced his up coming album entitled Pressure Is A Privilege. The album's singles leading up to release included Make It Make Sense feat Jazzy, The Wolves, Pressure Is A Privilege feat Jazzy and Highly Favored . The album was made available for pre order with a release date set for December 4, 2026. K. Sparks handled the majority of the writing, while features included Jazzy and Nation. Production was handled by several Producers such as Yogic (credits: Summer Walker), Kaddy, Impala Drummerz, Vei Beats, and Slick B. The album was mixed by K. Sparks frequent collaborator and engineer Kurser (credits: The Pharcyde).

Pressure Is A Privilege Track-List

1. The Top (feat. Jazzy)
2. Make It Make Sense (feat. Jazzy)
3. Sinners (feat. Nation)
4. The Wolves
5. Say Dat
6. You Not Really Like That
7. Where Do You Stay
8. Pressure Is A Privilege (feat. Jazzy)
9. Business
10. Highly Favored
11. Memories To Enemies
12. Pay No Mind
13. Nothing Even Matters (feat. Jazzy)

== Discography ==
Studio albums

- The Future Problem Vol 2 (July 28, 2006)
- The Future Problem Vol 3 (December 6, 2006)
- The Blue Tape (March 12, 2008)
- Hip Hop 101 (July 23, 2008)
- Definition (September 28, 2008)
- The Red Tape (April 9, 2009)
- Queens vs Brooklyn (August 2, 2009)
- Super Senior (October 25, 2009)
- Soul Food (December 19, 2009)
- The Trilogy Chapter 1 (July 8, 2010)
- The Trilogy Chapter 2 (September 26, 2010)
- The Trilogy Chapter 3 (November 17, 2010)
- Tomorrow Today (April 5, 2011)
- Positive Over Negative (April 30, 2011)
- A Day in the Life (September 4, 2011)
- A Day in the Life Kurser Remix Suite (November 22, 2011)
- September Lounge (July 9, 2012)
- Read Between The Lines (December 5, 2012)
- Self-Portrait (July 2, 2013)
- Vintage Art (August 23, 2014)
- The Blue Tape 2 (February 20, 2014)
- Seasons Theme (February 26, 2016)
- The Black Cassette (January 3, 2017)
- Gold (April 5, 2017)
- Urban Couture (October 15, 2017)
- Note to Self (November 1, 2018)
- Urban Couture The Beat Tape (February 14, 2019)
- 1999 (September 28, 2020)
- King (July 30, 2021)
- Sparks 3 (August 17, 2022)
- Family Affairs (July 3, 2024)
- Sunday Supper (March 7, 2025)
- Pressure Is A Privilege (December 4, 2026)

Mixtapes & Appearances

- The Future Problem Vol 1 (2005)
- Manic Mondays Vol 1 (2008)
- Manic Mondays Vol 2 (2008)
- Manic Mondays Vol 3 (2008)
- Wild Style Champs (Nick Cannon) (2008)
- Soul Child (2008)
- Call The Boss (2008)
- Area 51 (2008)
- Mixtape Addict Vol 12 (2008)
- When The Smoke Clears Vol 1 (2009)
- When The Smoke Clears Vol 2 (2009)
- When The Smoke Clears Vol 3 (2009)
- Queens 2 Germany (2009)
- Audio Up Rising (DJ Envy) (2010)
- XXL Freshman 2010 (2010)
- Double Up Radio Vol 1 (2010)
- Double Up Radio Vol 2 (2010)
- Double Up Radio Vol 3 (2010)
- Double Up Radio Vol 4 (2010)
- Double Up Radio Vol 5 (2011)
- The Camera Neva Lies (Royce da 5'9") (2011)
- The Report (2011)
- The Moon Man (Kid Cudi) (2011)
- Diagnosis Success (Rapsody, Jarren Benton) (2011)
