= Spend Dat =

Single by Yung Miami

from the album Watch Dis!
- Released: April 24, 2026
- Genre: Hip-hop
- Length: 3:01
- Label: Quality Control; Motown
- Songwriters: Caresha Brownlee; Akil King; Maurice Simmonds; Anthony White; Ronny Wright
- Producer: J. White Did It

Yung Miami singles chronology
"Tea Time" (2026)	"Spend Dat" (2026)	"F You" (2026)

Music video
- "Spend Dat" on YouTube

"Spend Dat" is a song by American rapper Yung Miami. It was released on April 24, 2026, as the lead single from her debut studio album Watch Dis! (2026). She wrote the song with the producer J. White Did It, Akil King, Maurice Simmonds and Ronny Wright. The song peaked at number 17 on the Billboard Hot 100, becoming Miami's highest charting song to date, with its success driven by a dance trend on TikTok.

== Composition ==
In the song, Yung Miami centers on her luxury and independence, rapping over an instrumental consisting of "soulful guitar licks, soft piano chords, and a simple, bouncy percussion pattern".

Dr. Melina Abdullah of the Los Angeles Sentinel framed the song as an expression of a working class resistance against a capitalist system, citing lyrics about making money through scamming and theft, as well as those expressing anti-police sentiment.

== Critical reception ==
Shawn Grant of The Source wrote the song "captures the raw confidence and magnetic charisma that have established Yung Miami as a leading voice in hip-hop". Gabriel Bras Nevares of HotNewHipHop described it as "a bit of a slow-burner when it comes to the pace, but a nasal yet infectious chorus makes it hit in a club setting." Many outlets have considered it the song of the summer in 2026.

The song was nominated for Best Rap Song at the 69th Annual Grammy Awards in 2027.

== Music video ==
The music video was released along with the song. It was directed by Supo Supreme and Yung Miami, and is set in an opulent strip club. Miami's face appears on a $100 bill. The video features cameos from NeNe Leakes, Trina, Trick Daddy, and Ball Greezy.

== Controversy ==
A user on Threads called for a boycott of the song, believing it promotes crime and considering it degrading to Black culture. Singer India Arie agreed with this sentiment, emphasizing that music can influence attitudes and encouraging listeners to make wise choices. However, others have argued the song is intended for entertainment rooted in Yung Miami's music style rather than to encourage illegal behavior. Isaac Hayes III accused the outrage over the song as "fake, hypocritical and goofy" and noted that similarly explicit and provocative themes had long been present in hip-hop. Trick Daddy opined that the criticism directed at Arie's comments stemmed from jealousy over her physical appearance.

== Remixes ==
On August 28, 2026, Yung Miami released two remixes of the song. The first features American rappers Lil Baby and Kodak Black, while the second is called the "International Remix" and features Nigerian-American singer Davido and Jamaican singers Shenseea and Vybz Kartel. Miami raps new verses on both remixes.

== Charts ==
Chart performance for "Spend Dat"
Chart (2026)	Peak position
Canada (Canadian Hot 100)	96
Global 200 (Billboard)	186
New Zealand Hot Singles (RMNZ)	14
Nigeria (TurnTable Top 100) International Remix	89
US Billboard Hot 100	17
US Hot R&B/Hip-Hop Songs (Billboard)	4

== Certifications ==
Certifications for "Spend Dat"
Region	Certification	Certified units/sales
United States (RIAA)	Platinum	1,000,000^{‡}
^{‡} Sales+streaming figures based on certification alone.
