= Dios Bendiga =

Studio album by Cypress Hill
- Released: July 24, 2026
- Genre: Hip-hop
- Length: 37:52
- Language: Spanish
- Label: Hybe Latin America
- Producer: DJ Flict

Cypress Hill chronology
Back in Black (2022)	Dios Bendiga (2026)

Dios Bendiga is the eleventh studio album by the American hip-hop group Cypress Hill. It was released on July 24, 2026, via Hybe Latin America. Produced by DJ Flict, it features guest appearances from Coyote, Sick Jacken, Alemán, La Santa Grifa, Mellow Man Ace, Poe Leos, and Trueno.

The album marks the second Spanish-language project and the first album of new material.

== Track listing ==
Dios Bendiga track listing
No.	Title	Writer(s)	Length
1.	"Wacha Trucha" (with Alemán)	Louis Freese; Erick Raúl Alemán Ramírez; Chris Aparri	2:29
2.	"Campeones" (with Mellow Man Ace)	Freese; Senen Reyes; Aparri; Ulpiano Sergio Reyes	3:48
3.	"Rosas Verdes"	Freese; Aparri; U. Reyes	2:49
4.	"Run" (with Poe Leos)	Freese; Aparri; Polet Leos	2:44
5.	"Sueños" (with Coyote)	Freese; Aparri; Ricardo Morales; Victor Manuel Morales; Sergio Centeno de la Torre	3:40
6.	"Estamos Listos"	Freese; S. Reyes; Aparri	2:36
7.	"Voló" (with Sick Jacken)	Freese; Aparri; Joaquín González	2:37
8.	"Saca La Bolsita" (with Trueno)	Freese; S. Reyes; Aparri; Mateo Palacios Corazzina	3:51
9.	"No Tengo Miedo" (with Sick Jacken)	Freese; Eric "Bobo" Correa; Aparri; González; V. Morales	3:54
10.	"Barrios Prendidos" (with La Santa Grifa)	Freese; S. Reyes; Aparri; Bryant Ernesto Castellanos Cruz	3:26
11.	"El Perro y El Coyote" (with Ladies Love Guapo)	Freese; Aparri; Centeno de la Torre; Moroales	2:49
12.	"Otra"	Freese; S. Reyes; Aparri	3:09
Total length:			37:52

== Personnel ==
Credits are adapted from Tidal.

=== Cypress Hill ===
- B-Real – performance
- Eric Bobo – drums, musical direction, background vocals on "Voló" and "Otra"
- DJ Muggs – performance
- Sen Dog – performance

=== Additional contributors ===
- DJ Flict – production
- DJ Lord – sampler
- Damien Lewis – engineering, mixing, background vocals on "Wacha Trucha"
- John Armstrong – engineering assistance
- Matt Cerritos – Atmos mixing
- Joe LaPorta – mastering
- Ashley Valentine – background vocals on "Voló"
- Pedro Garcia Jr. – background vocals on "Saca La Bolsita" and "Otra"

== Charts ==
Chart (2026)	Peak position
Swiss Albums (Schweizer Hitparade)	39
UK Album Downloads (Official Charts)	99
