= What a Time (album) =

Studio album by Barry Manilow
- Released: June 5, 2026
- Length: 49:01
- Label: Stiletto
- Producers: Babyface; Greg Bartheld; David Benson; Ralph Churchwell; Dave Cobb; Michael Lloyd; Barry Manilow; Michael Nielsen; Demonte Posey; Allen Sovory II

Barry Manilow chronology
Night Songs II (2020)	What a Time (2026)

Singles from What a Time
- 1. "Once Before I Go" Released: November 11, 2025; 2. "Sun Shine" Released: March 23, 2026; 3. "Another Life-2026" Released: May 8, 2026

What a Time is the thirty-third studio album by the American singer Barry Manilow, released on June 5, 2026, by Manilow's own Stiletto Entertainment. Produced by Manilow and longtime collaborator Michael Lloyd, the album contains new songs, his first album consisting of almost entirely new songs in around 15 years. Two of the songs were released as singles, "Once Before I Go", and "Sun Shine". The fourth track is a re-recording of the song "Another Life", which originally was released on the 1992 box set The Complete Collection and Then Some....

== Background ==
In November 2025, Manilow was diagnosed with stage 1 lung cancer after doctors ordered for him to take an MRI scan. After having surgery to remove it, he announced he was releasing an album. As Manilow told NPR: "This album is filled with my favorite, favorite songs that I've ever written, and I'm so happy there's now a place for them." The social media posts of the announcement of the album read: "Barry Manilow returns with What A Time, his first album of almost all original material in nearly 15 years! The result is a collection that pairs Manilow's signature melodic grandeur with fresh textures and stylistic turns."

== Release and reception ==
The album was released on June 5, 2026, on Stiletto Entertainment, a publication company owned by Manilow. The albums' single "Sun Shine" was well received by critic Sophie Gliott of HotPress believing that it "is radiant of [a] feel-good new single" from the album. To promote the album, Manilow is embarking on a tour scheduled to end on January 21, 2027.

== Track listing ==
What a Time track listing
No.	Title	Writer(s)	Producer(s)	Length
1.	"Once Before I Go"	Peter Allen; Dean Pitchford	Babyface; Demonte Posey; Mary Webster^{[s]}	3:30
2.	"What a Time"	Barry Manilow; John Bettis	Manilow; Michael Lloyd	2:56
3.	"Sun Shine"	Manilow; Gary Barlow	Manilow; Greg Bartheld; David Benson	3:12
4.	"Another Life" (2026)	Andy Hill; Preston Sturges	Manilow; Lloyd	4:16
5.	"Touched by an Angel"	Manilow; Bruce Sussman	Manilow; Lloyd; Bartheld^{[c]}	3:28
6.	"The Chosen One"	Manilow	Manilow; Ralph Churchwell; Lloyd; Michael Nielsen; Allen Sovory II	4:23
7.	"One More Chance"	Manilow; Sussman	Manilow; Lloyd	4:01
8.	"Nobody Knows My Song"	Manilow; Enoch Anderson	Manilow; Lloyd	3:33
9.	"When Somebody Says Goodbye" (duet with Sharon "Muffy" Hendrix)	Manilow; Lisa Sennett	Manilow; Lloyd	3:58
10.	"Don't Trouble the Water"	Manilow; Anderson	Manilow; Bartheld; Benson	2:46
11.	"Look at Me Now" (featuring Dave Koz)	Manilow; Bettis	Dave Cobb	3:48
12.	"Nobody Told Me"	Manilow; Bettis	Manilow; Lloyd	4:04
13.	"Coming of Age"	Manilow; Adrienne Anderson	Manilow; Lloyd; Nielsen	5:09
Total length:				49:01

=== Notes ===
- ^{^[c]} indicates a co-producer
- ^{^[s]} indicates a strings producer

== Personnel ==
Credits are adapted from Tidal.

=== Musicians ===
- Barry Manilow – lead vocals (all tracks), piano (tracks 1–3, 5, 7–10), arrangement (2–10, 12, 13)
- Demonte Posey – drums, programming (1)
- Babyface – bass guitar (1)
- Paul Boutin – percussion (1)
- Michael Lloyd – programming (2, 7–9, 12), keyboards (2, 7, 12), background vocals (4, 6, 13), drums (4, 9, 13), arrangement (4), piano (5)
- David Benson – programming (3, 10)
- Greg Bartheld – programming (3, 10)
- Ken Berry – electric guitar (3)
- Keely Vasquez – background vocals (5)
- Kye Brackett – background vocals (5)
- Melanie Taylor – background vocals (5)
- Monica Page – background vocals (5)
- Ian Martin – bass guitar (5)
- Voncielle Faggette – chorus master (5)
- Mike Lent – electric guitar (5)
- Joe Melotti – keyboards (5)
- Ron Pedley – keyboards (5)
- David Rozenblatt – percussion (5)
- Ron Walters Jr. – piano (5)
- Allen Sovory II – background vocals (6)
- Reggie Hamilton – bass guitar (6)
- Curt Bisquera – drums (6)
- Michael Nielsen – electric guitar (6, 13)
- Ralph Churchwell – keyboards (6)
- Greg O'Connor – programming (8)
- Sharon Hendrix – lead vocals (9)
- Dave Cobb – acoustic guitar (11)
- Brian Allen – bass guitar (11)
- Chris Powell – drums (11)
- Phillip Towns – keyboards (11)
- Dave Koz – saxophone (11)
- Bill Cantos – background vocals (13)
- Randy Crenshaw – background vocals (13)
- Ron Dante – background vocals (13)
- Sean Hurley – bass guitar (13)
- Andrew Sterling – drums (13)
- Andrew Synowiec – guitar (13)

=== Technical ===
- Paul Boutin – engineering, mixing (1)
- Michael Lloyd – engineering (2, 4, 5, 7–9, 13), mixing (2, 4, 5, 7–9, 12, 13)
- Bob Kearney – engineering (2, 4, 7–9, 12), digital editing (4)
- Greg Bartheld – engineering, mixing (3, 5, 10); vocal engineering (1), additional engineering (5)
- David Benson – engineering, mixing (3, 10)
- Greg Koller – engineering, mixing (11)
- Phillip Smith – engineering assistance (11)
- Tony Shepperd – mixing (6)
- Michael Nielsen – mixing (13)
- Andrew Brightman – production coordination (11)

== Charts ==
Chart performance for What a Time
Chart (2026)	Peak position
Scottish Albums (Official Charts)	6
UK Albums (Official Charts)	34
UK Independent Albums (Official Charts)	3
US Top Album Sales (Billboard)	13
US Independent Albums (Billboard)	44
