= Vial (band) =

American punk rock band

VIAL
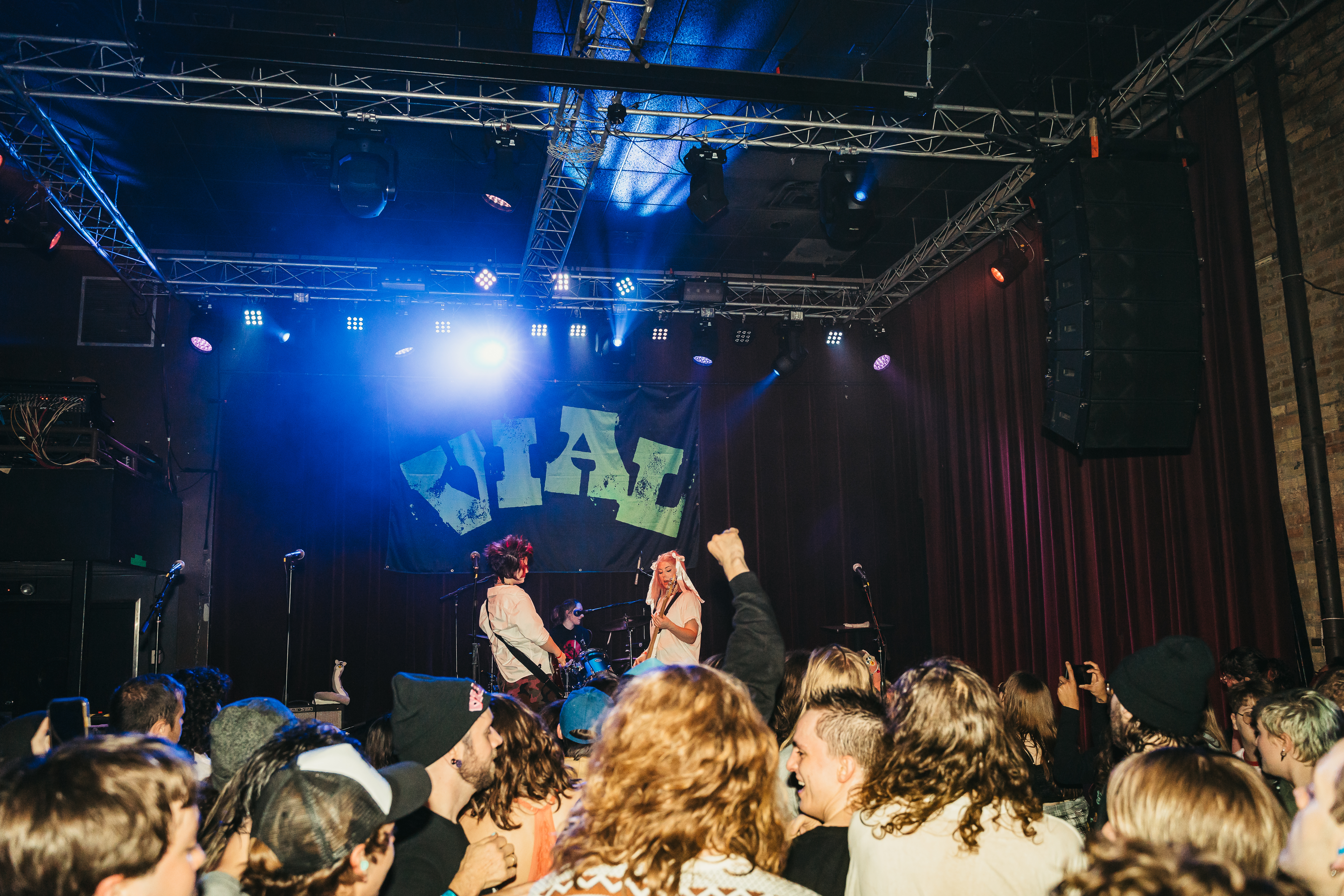
- VIAL performing in 2023

Background information
- Origin: Minneapolis, Minnesota, United States
- Genres: Punk rock; pop punk; pop rock; Hardcore punk; Garage Punk; Riot Grrrl
- Years active: 2019–present
- Label: Get Better Records
- Members: KT Branscom; Katie Fischer
- Past members: Grey Kanfield; Taylor Kraemer
- Website: www.vialband.com

Vial (stylized in all caps) is an American punk rock band, formed in 2019 in Minneapolis, Minnesota and consisting of vocalist-guitarist KT Branscom, and vocalist-drummer Katie Fischer. Grey Kanfield is the former bassist of the band, leaving the band in 2022. Taylor Kraemer left the band in 2026.

Vial released their debut EP, Grow Up, in November 2019. Their first full-length album, Loudmouth, was released in July 2021. The EP Burnout was released in March 2024. A re-recorded version of their first EP, under the new title Grow the Fuck Up, was released in November 2024. The band's second full-length album, Hellhound, was released in March 2026.
