= Friko =

American rock band

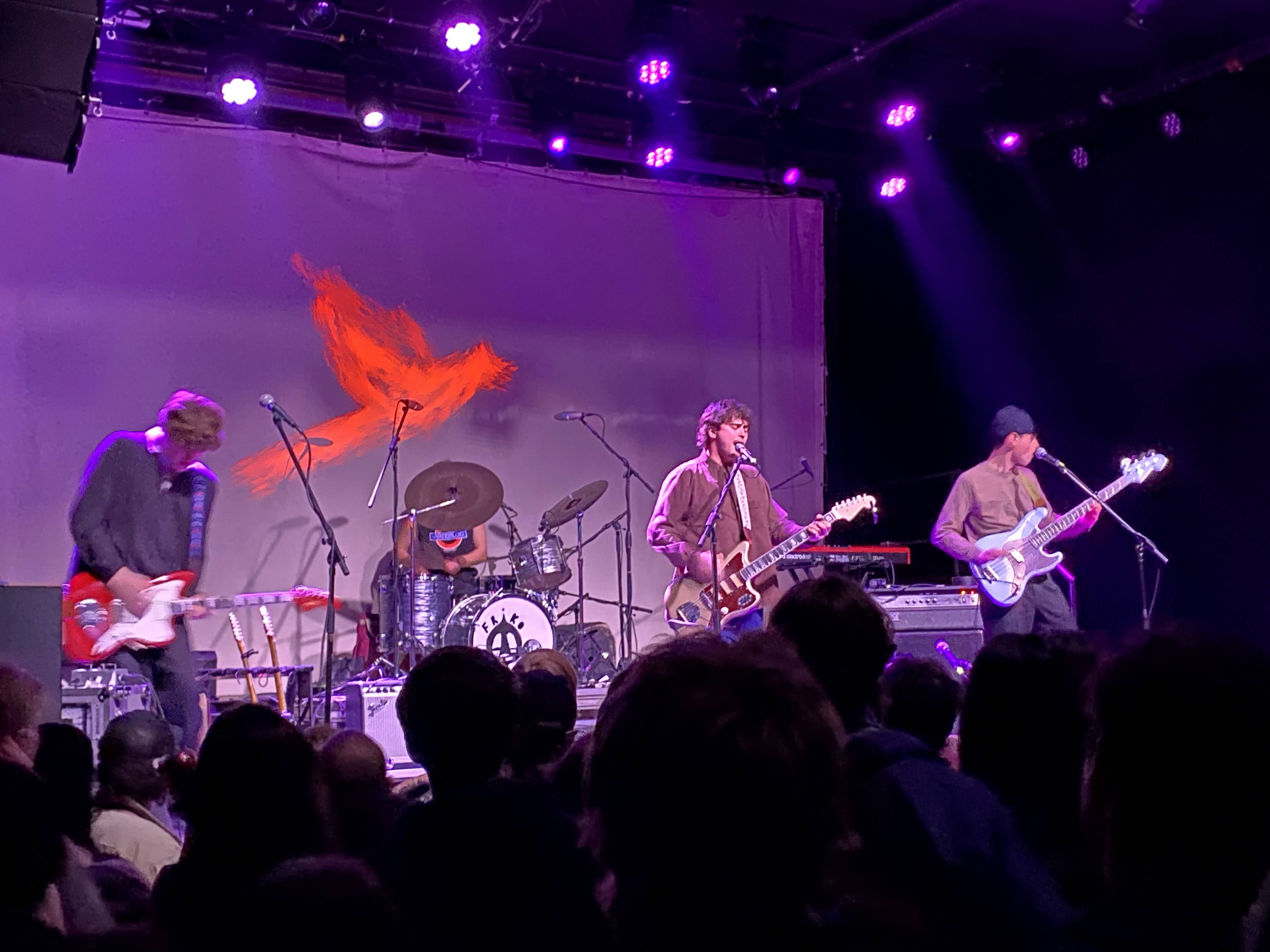
- Friko in 2025

Background information
- Origin: Evanston, Illinois, U.S.
- Genres: Indie rock, noise pop, chamber pop
- Years active: 2019–present
- Label: ATO Records
- Members: Niko Kapetan; Bailey Minzenberger; Korgan Robb; David Fuller
- Past members: Luke Stamos
- Website: whoisfriko.com

Friko is an American indie rock band formed in Chicago, Illinois, in 2019. The band consists of Niko Kapetan (lead vocals, guitar), Bailey Minzenberger (drums), David Fuller (bass) and Korgan Robb (guitar). The quartet is currently signed to ATO Records.

The band have released two studio albums – Where We've Been, Where We Go from Here (2024) and Something Worth Waiting For (2026) – to critical acclaim.

== History ==
Friko began in 2019 as a project consisting of Niko Kapetan, Luke Stamos and Bailey Minzenberger. All three members were graduates of Evanston Township High School. After releasing their first EP in 2020, the trio released their second EP Whenever Forever in 2022. In August 2023, Friko signed with the label ATO Records and announced they were to be just a duo with Kapetan and Minzenberger.

In November 2023, the duo announced plans to release their debut album. The album, Where We've Been, Where We Go from Here, was released on February 16, 2024. The band cited MewithoutYou, Mitski, and The Beach Boys as inspiration for the album. Upon release of the album, the song "Get Numb To It!" was named "Today's Top Tune" by KCRW and one of "9 New Albums You Should Listen to Now" by Pitchfork. The album received positive reviews.

Following Where We've Been…'s release, Friko expanded to a four-piece with the addition of guitarist Korgan Robb and bassist David Fuller. The band's second album, Something Worth Waiting For, was recorded in Los Angeles with producer John Congleton, and was announced in February 2026 for an April 24, 2026 release.

== Members ==
=== Current ===
- Niko Kapetan — lead vocals, guitar (2019–present)
- Bailey Minzenberger — drums (2019–present)
- David Fuller — bass guitar (2023–present)
- Korgan Robb — guitar (2024–present)

=== Past members ===
- Luke Stamos — bass guitar (2019–2023)

== Discography ==
=== Studio albums ===
- Where We've Been, Where We Go from Here (2024)
- Something Worth Waiting For (2026)

=== EPs ===
- EP1 (2020)
- Whenever Forever (2022)

=== Demos ===
- Burnout Beautiful (2019)
