= Loudmouth (Vial album) =

Studio album by VIAL
- Released: July 30, 2021
- Genre: Punk rock; pop punk; pop rock; rock
- Length: 31:00
- Label: Get Better
- Producer: Henry Stoehr; Avery Springer

VIAL chronology
Something More (2021)	Loudmouth (2021)	Embryo (2022)

Vial studio album chronology
Grow Up (2019)	Loudmouth (2021)	burnout (2024)

Singles from Loudmouth
- 1. "Roadkill" Released: June 8, 2021; 2. "Violet" Released: June 22, 2021; 3. "Something More" Released: July 14, 2021

Loudmouth (stylized in all caps) is the debut studio album by American punk rock band VIAL. Produced by Henry Stoehr of Slow Plup, Loudmouth was released on July 30, 2021. The album was released through Get Better Records in America and was sold in Europe by Specialist Subject Records and Hassle Records. In the official behind the scenes video, Taylor Kraemer had said the band had been working on the songs for a year and a half. Later in the video, Katie Fischer said that they had the song ‘Piss Punk’ way before their first EP Grow Up was made.

== Track listing ==
No.	Title	Lyrics	Length
1.	"Ego Death" (sung by Taylor Kraemer)	KT Branscom, Grey Kanfield, Taylor Kraemer and Katie Fischer	2:17
2.	"Violet" (sung by Taylor Kraemer)	Taylor Kraemer	2:32
3.	"Planet Drool" (sung by Katie Fischer)	Katie Fischer, Grey Kanfield and Taylor Kraemer	2:27
4.	"Mr. Fuck You" (sung by KT Branscom)	KT Branscom	2:31
5.	"Something More" (sung by Taylor Kraemer)	Taylor Kraemer	3:00
6.	"Thumb" (sung by KT Branscom)	KT Branscom	3:23
7.	"Piss Punk" (sung by Taylor Kraemer)	Taylor Kraemer	2:01
8.	"Therapy Part.II" (sung by Taylor Kraemer)	Grey Kanfield	2:27
9.	"Roadkill" (sung by KT Branscom)	KT Branscom, Katie Fischer, Grey Kanfield and Taylor Kraemer	2:37
10.	"Vodka Lemonade" (sung by Taylor Kraemer)	Taylor Kraemer	2:25
11.	"Addict" (sung by KT Branscom)	KT Branscom	2:57
12.	"21" (sung by Taylor Kraemer)	Taylor Kraemer and Katie Fischer	2:28
Total length:			31:00

== Personnel ==
Vial

- Taylor Kraemer - Synthesizer, bass (track 9) and vocals
- KT Branscom - Guitar (all tracks), lead guitar (track 9) and vocals
- Grey Kanfield - Bass (all tracks except 9), rhythm guitar (track 9) and background vocals
- Katie Fischer - Drums (all tracks), auxiliary percussion (tracks 2, 6, 11 and 12) piano (track 1), and vocals

Additional musicians

- Sam Tudor - Violin (track 1)
- NATL PARK SRVC - Guest vocals (track 7)
- Beatrice Lawrence - Trumpet (track 10)

Technical

- Henry Stoehr - Production, mixing and recording
- Avery Springer - Production
- Ryan Schwabe - Mastering
- Erik Rasmussen - Mixing
- Julia Fletcher, Emma Eubanks - Cover art and design
