= Embers to Ashes =

Studio album by Everlast
- Released: August 28, 2026
- Label: Martyr Inc
- Producer: Yelawolf

Everlast chronology
Whitey Ford's House of Pain (2018)	Embers to Ashes (2026)

Singles from Embers to Ashes
- 1. "Stones" Released: March 13, 2026

Professional ratings
Review scores
Source	Rating
laut.de	3/5 stars
Record Collector	3/5 stars

Embers to Ashes is the ninth solo studio album by American musician Everlast. It was released on August 28, 2026 via Martyr Inc Records, marking his fourth project for the label. Production was handled entirely by Yelawolf. The music videos for the songs "Stones", "My Hollywood", "Losing Man's Game", "Peace of Mind" and "Mistaken Identity" were directed by Ryen McPherson. The album debuted at number 23 on the Swiss Hitparade and number 76 on the German Offizielle Top 100.

== Track listing ==
No.	Title	Writer(s)	Length
1.	"Losing Man's Game"	Erik Schrody; Aaron Christopher Lamb; Michael Wayne Atha
2.	"Never Coming Home"	Schrody; Lamb; David Ray Stevens; Peter Keys; Atha
3.	"Mistaken Identity"	Schrody; Lamb; Stevens; Louis Winfield; Atha
4.	"My Hollywood"	Schrody; Stevens; Brandon Michael Sammons; Nance Jackson; Sebastian Yatra
5.	"Broken Heart for Hire"	Schrody; Stevens; Philip Kirk Mosley; Jay Statham
6.	"Stones"	Schrody; Stevens; John Pierce; Benjamin Davis
7.	"Out of Your Way"	Schrody; Stevens; Atha
8.	"Lies"	Schrody; Stevens; Atha
9.	"Rubber Bullets"	Schrody; Darius Anthony Holbert
10.	"Every Dog Has Its Day"	Schrody; Stevens; Atha
11.	"Ain't Coming Home Tonight"	Schrody; Lamb; Atha
12.	"Love Don't Heal"	Schrody; Stevens; Atha
13.	"Embers to Ashes"	Schrody; Stevens; Atha
14.	"1987"	Schrody; Stevens; Atha
15.	"Happy You Can Cry"	Schrody; Stevens; Colton Parker; Atha
16.	"Peace of Mind"	Schrody; Stevens; Peter Michael Pisarczyk; Atha
17.	"Young Man"	Schrody; Antoine Thomas

== Personnel ==
- Erik "Everlast" Schrody – vocals, guitar, co-producer, executive producer
- Michael "Yelawolf" Atha – background vocals, producer
- David Ray Stevens – background vocals
- Hannah Everhart – background vocals
- Sarina-Joi Crowe – background vocals
- Phillip Hughley – acoustic guitar, electric guitar, ganjo
- Colton Parker – acoustic guitar, electric guitar, bass
- Bruce Bouton – lap steel guitar
- Peter Keys – piano, B-3 organ, Wurlitzer organ, Farfisa organ, synths, clavinet, melodica, bells
- Darius Holbert – additional keyboards (track 9)
- Louis "Flip" Winfield – drums, percussion
- Gabe Baker – cello
- Emmanuel Echem – trumpet, flugelhorn
- Noah Gardner – violin
- Josh "DJ Klever" Winkler – turntables
- Chris Lord-Alge – mixing
- Jason Mott – engineering
- Brian Judd – additional mixing
- Greyson Smith – additional engineering
- Ted Jensen – mastering
- Ivory Daniel – co-executive producer
- Kevin Zinger – co-executive producer
- Tristan Eaton – artwork
- Lisa Franchot – photography

== Charts ==
Chart (2026)	Peak position
German Albums (Offizielle Top 100)	76
Swiss Albums (Schweizer Hitparade)	23
UK Album Downloads (Official Charts)	76
UK Independent Albums (Official Charts)	10
