= Relationship of 21 Savage and Drake =

Collaborations and friendship between rappers Drake and 21 Savage

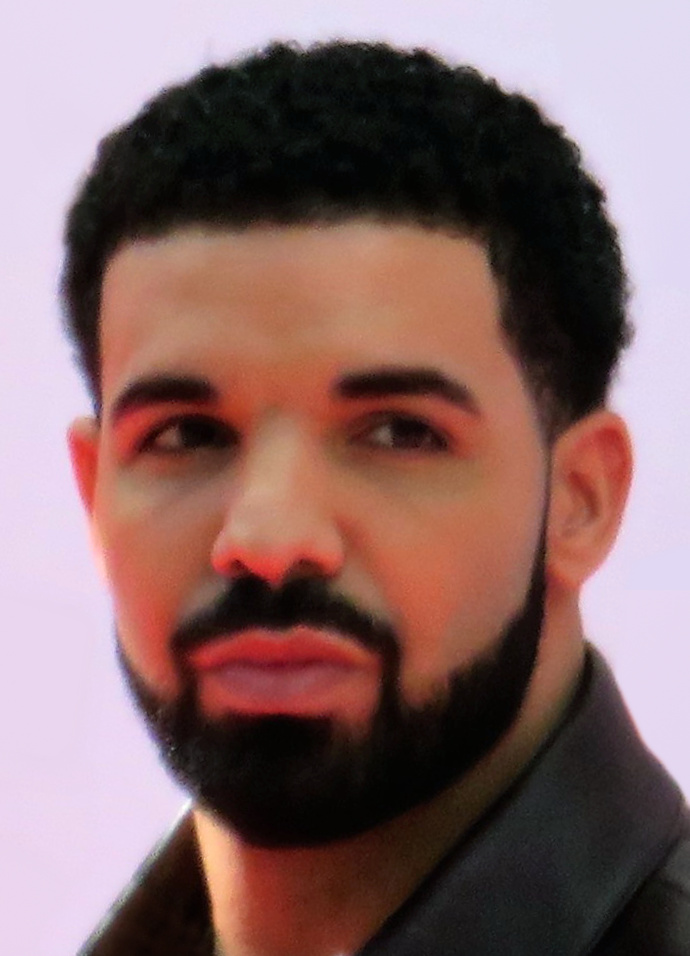
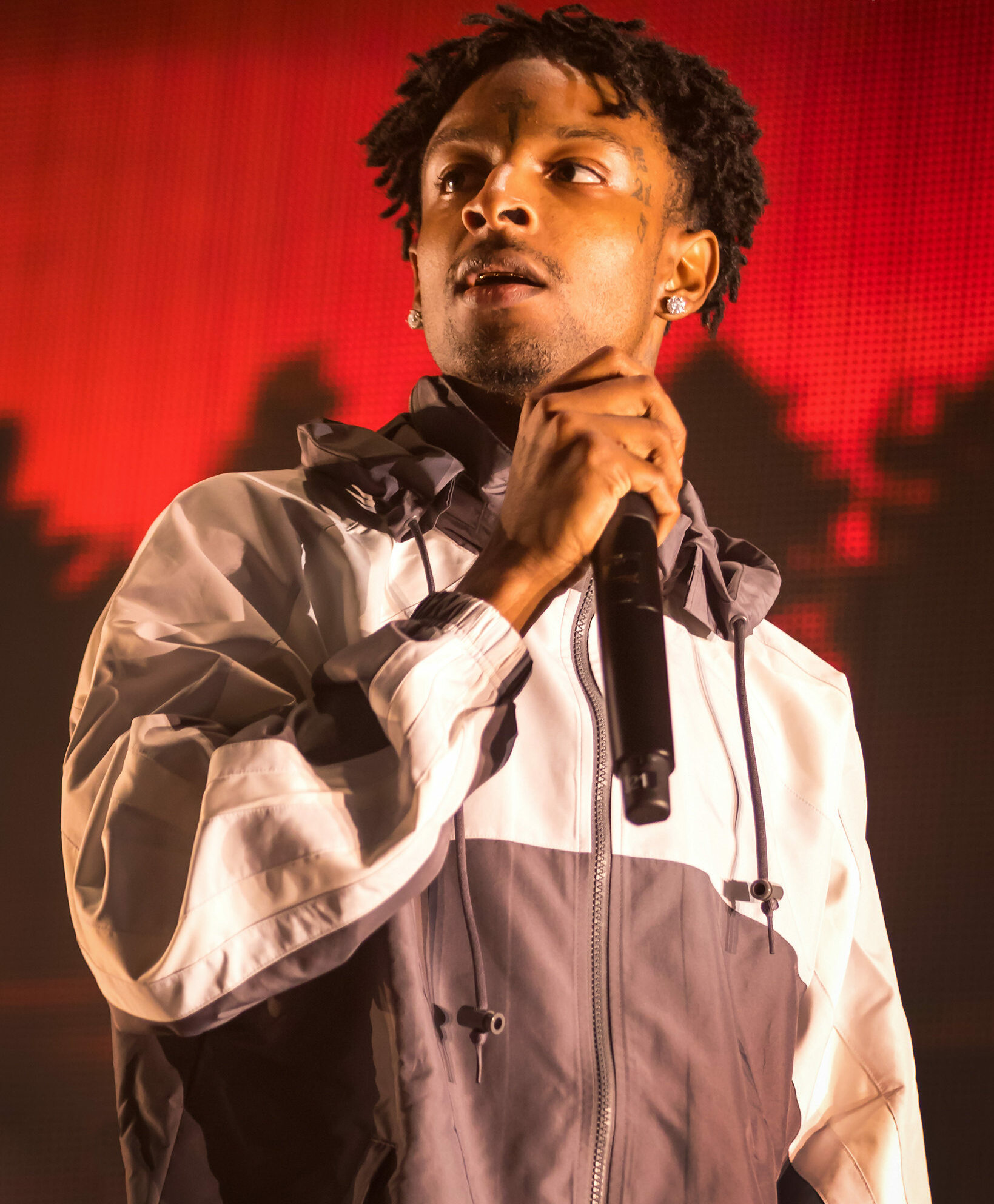
Drake (left) and 21 Savage (right)

The relationship between the Canadian rapper Drake and the Atlanta-based rapper 21 Savage has produced several collaborations since 2016. Their first song together, "Sneakin'", was premiered in October 2016. They later worked together on "Mr. Right Now" (2020), "Knife Talk" (2021), "Jimmy Cooks" (2022) and "It's Up" (2024). In 2022 they released the joint album Her Loss, which debuted at number one on the Billboard 200, and in 2023 they toured together on the It's All a Blur Tour. During Drake's 2024 feud with Kendrick Lamar, 21 Savage stayed publicly neutral, and in 2025 he said he had advised Drake not to engage in it. Drake appeared on 21 Savage's 2025 album What Happened to the Streets?.

== History ==
=== 2016–2019: Early collaborations ===
21 Savage emerged in 2016, and Drake described him that year as "a young October king with all the juice right now". The two share October birthdays. For 21 Savage's 24th birthday that month, Drake arranged for him to use a Ferrari during his stay in Los Angeles. Many people assumed the car was a gift; 21 Savage said it was a loan, that he liked it enough to buy one himself afterward, and that it was the only gift he received that year.

Drake premiered "Sneakin'" with 21 Savage on October 23, 2016, on his OVO Sound Radio show on Beats 1. The episode also featured "Fake Love" and "Two Birds, One Stone", and Drake announced a new project, More Life, during the broadcast. London on da Track produced the song, and the music video was directed by Gab3. Rolling Stone ranked "Sneakin'" number 81 on a list of the 100 best Drake songs and noted that 21 Savage went on to become one of Drake's most frequent collaborators. In 2022, Complex ranked it third of the four songs the pair had released up to that point, writing that it established the formula of hard-edged, paranoid raps over menacing production that they have tried to repeat since.

21 Savage also recorded "Issa" with Drake and Young Thug. A preview leaked in December 2016 and the full song leaked in May 2017. It was expected to appear on 21 Savage's July 2017 album Issa Album but was left off. According to engineer Alex Tumay, the label thought the leak would hurt its reception. As of 2023 it was not on streaming services, but could be found on SoundCloud and YouTube.

In 2018, 21 Savage told GQ that Drake had done favors for him that he did not need to do, and that Drake did not get enough credit for promoting up-and-coming rappers.

=== 2020–2022: "Mr. Right Now" and Her Loss ===
Drake appeared on "Mr. Right Now", from Savage Mode II, 21 Savage and Metro Boomin's collaborative album released on October 2, 2020. On the song, 21 Savage performs the hook and Drake has the longest verse. Drake's line saying he dated SZA in 2008 drew attention; SZA confirmed that they had dated but said it was in 2009. Complex ranked it the weakest of their first four songs, writing that 21 Savage attempts Drake-style melodic singing.

"Knife Talk" appeared on Drake's 2021 album Certified Lover Boy. It was originally meant for Savage Mode II and was finished in time to make Drake's album. Project Pat, who opens the song, said Metro Boomin passed it to Drake after it was supposed to appear on 21 Savage's album. Metro Boomin produced it. Complex ranked it second of their first four songs.

In 2021, 21 Savage told DJ Akademiks that if he were not a rapper, he did not think he would listen to Drake, and he explained that people in his circle in Atlanta did not listen to Drake much. In early 2022, 21 Savage's manager Justin "Meezy" Williams said during a Clubhouse conversation that the two never discussed money for features.

21 Savage was the only guest on Drake's June 2022 album Honestly, Nevermind, appearing on "Jimmy Cooks". The song debuted at number one on the Billboard Hot 100, Drake's 11th chart-topper. The video was released on October 22, 2022, 21 Savage's 30th birthday, and included the announcement of Her Loss. Complex ranked "Jimmy Cooks" first among their songs, writing that 21 Savage outshone Drake on it. After the song's success, 21 Savage compared the two of them to Kobe Bryant and Shaquille O'Neal in a post on Twitter.

The release date for Her Loss was announced on October 22, 2022, with an original date of October 28. The release was delayed a week after producer Noah "40" Shebib contracted COVID-19, and the album came out on November 4, 2022. It has 16 tracks, with Travis Scott as the only credited guest, and lists Drake and 21 Savage as executive producers.

The pair promoted the album with a mock rollout that included a fake Vogue cover, a fake Tiny Desk concert and a fake Howard Stern interview. Drake publicly thanked Vogue editor Anna Wintour for the "support".

In audio from a SiriusXM interview, 21 Savage said Drake wrote some of his verses on the album, and Drake replied that 21 Savage had also helped him. Drake had faced ghostwriting allegations since his 2015 dispute with Meek Mill.

The album debuted at number one on the Billboard 200, Drake's second number-one album in less than five months. Eight of its songs entered the Billboard Hot 100 in positions two through nine, and "Rich Flex" peaked at number two, behind Taylor Swift's "Anti-Hero". The album passed one billion streams on Spotify about two months after release and sold more than one million copies in the United States.

A line on "Circo Loco" appeared to doubt Megan Thee Stallion's account of being shot by Tory Lanez, and she criticized it on Twitter. Uproxx noted that 21 Savage's verse on "Rich Flex" also interpolates her song "Savage", for which she receives a writing credit.

=== 2023–2024: Her Loss aftermath, It's All a Blur Tour, and Kendrick Lamar feud ===
At the 2023 BET Hip Hop Awards Her Loss won Hip Hop Album of the Year, and at the 2023 Billboard Music Awards it won Top Rap Album. In February 2023, the duo released a video for "Spin Bout U" in which they are drugged and kidnapped by women on a cruise ship. Condé Nast, which publishes Vogue, had sued over trademark infringement and sought $4 million in damages. The case was settled in February 2023 for an undisclosed sum.

Drake and 21 Savage co-headlined the It's All a Blur Tour, which began in Chicago on July 5, 2023, and ran through October 9. 21 Savage later said that the money was what he liked most about touring with Drake, and that Drake paid him what he was worth rather than paying him as a friend.

In February 2023, Kodak Black said he no longer wanted to record with Drake because of Drake's work with 21 Savage. In October 2023, on Drink Champs, Kodak Black said 21 Savage had changed after making Her Loss. 21 Savage denied this, saying that the two had never been friends and that Kodak Black had changed after 21 Savage made an album with Drake.

In a Rolling Stone cover story published in December 2023, 21 Savage said that describing male friendships was "zesty" when asked about his friendship with Drake. The interviewer noted that the word can be used pejoratively. 21 Savage went on to say that he believed men and women should each follow set gender roles, according to Out.

On the Club Shay Shay podcast in January 2024, 21 Savage was asked whether people were envious of his relationship with Drake and answered by asking what it says about a man who is jealous of how well two other men get along. In an interview with Hypebeast released in late March 2024, Kanye West compared his partnership with Ty Dolla Sign to that of Drake and 21 Savage.

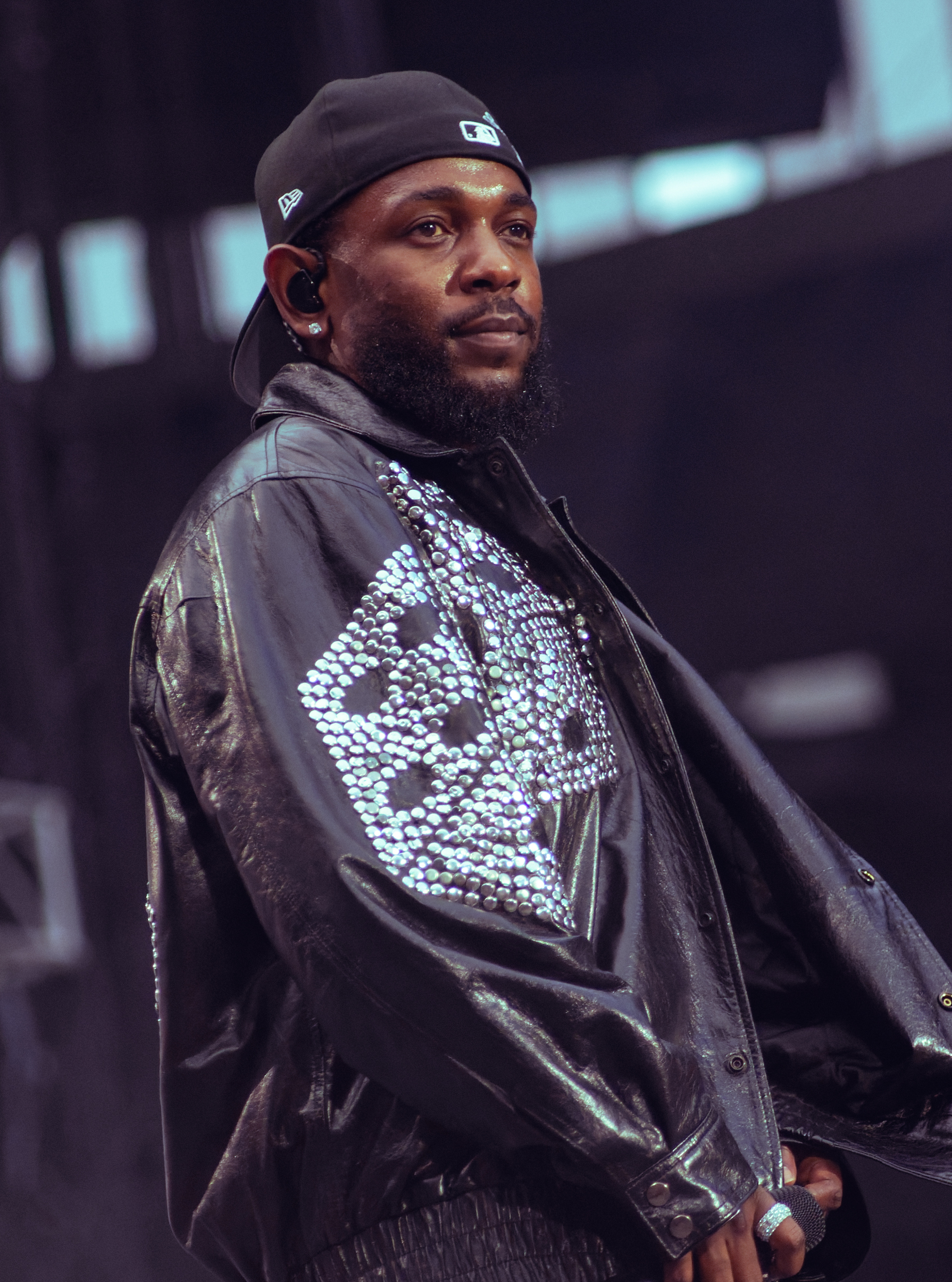
Kendrick Lamar, who named 21 Savage in "Not Like Us"

During Drake's 2024 feud with Kendrick Lamar, Lamar's "Not Like Us" named several Atlanta artists, including 21 Savage, as people who had given Drake credibility, saying that 21 Savage gave him "false street cred". On May 12, 2024, 21 Savage was asked about the feud during an Instagram Live. He said that both Metro Boomin and Drake were his brothers and that they would sort it out, and Billboard wrote that he had stayed neutral.

In August 2024, Drake posted three new songs through an Instagram account, including "It's Up" with 21 Savage and Young Thug. Writing for Rolling Stone, Jeff Ihaza said the song appeared to challenge the claim in "Not Like Us" that Drake's relationship with Atlanta artists was exploitative.

=== 2025–present: "Mr. Recoup" ===
On the Perspektives with Bank podcast, released on December 11, 2025, 21 Savage said he had told Drake not to respond to Lamar. He said he made the call after Lamar's first appearance in the exchange, a verse on Metro Boomin and Future's "Like That", which Rolling Stone and Billboard both reported was likely the occasion he meant. He said that Drake felt challenged lyrically and wanted to respond. 21 Savage argued that someone already at the top of rap has nothing to gain from such a battle, and he described the contest as rigged against Drake. He also said he thought Drake had taken an "internet hit" but that Drake's standing as a streaming artist had not suffered.

21 Savage released his album What Happened to the Streets? on December 12, 2025. It has 14 tracks. Drake appears on "Mr. Recoup", his only guest appearance of 2025 outside his OVO Sound circle. Craig Jenkins of Vulture called it the weaker of Drake's "Mr." songs with 21 Savage and wrote that the guest verses needed more time in the mix. On the album's opening track, "Where You From", 21 Savage tells listeners not to ask him about Metro Boomin or Drake.

== Discography ==
=== Singles ===
Singles on which Drake and 21 Savage both appear, with selected chart positions
Title	Year	Artists	Peak chart positions									Album
Title	Year	Artists	CAN	AUS	IRE	NZ	UK	US	US R&B /HH	US Rap	WW	Album
"Sneakin'"	2016	Drake (featuring 21 Savage)	20	81	80	—	52	28	8	7	—	Non-album single
"Mr. Right Now"	2020	21 Savage (featuring Metro Boomin and Drake)	9	39	23	—	28	10	6	6	—	Savage Mode II
"Knife Talk"	2021	Drake (featuring 21 Savage and Project Pat)	6	13	55	14	87	4	2	2	6	Certified Lover Boy
"Jimmy Cooks"	2022	Drake (featuring 21 Savage)	1	4	9	3	7	1	1	1	3	Honestly, Nevermind
"Rich Flex"	2022	Drake and 21 Savage	1	3	3	2	3	2	1	1	1	Her Loss
"Circo Loco"	2022	Drake and 21 Savage	5	9	7	35	7	8	7	7	8	Her Loss
"Spin Bout U"	2023	Drake and 21 Savage	9	55	—	—	—	5	4	4	7	Her Loss
"Mr. Recoup"	2025	Drake and 21 Savage	44	—	—	—	—	51	4	2	77	What Happened to the Streets?
"—" denotes a recording that did not chart or was not released in that territory.

=== Songs ===
Songs on which Drake and 21 Savage both appear, with selected chart positions
Title	Year	Artists	Peak chart positions									Album
Title	Year	Artists	CAN	AUS	IRE	NZ	UK	US	US R&B /HH	US Rap	WW	Album
"Major Distribution"	2022	Drake and 21 Savage	3	10	5	4	5	3	2	2	3	Her Loss
"On BS"	2022	Drake and 21 Savage	4	39	—	8	—	4	3	3	5	Her Loss
"Privileged Rappers"	2022	Drake and 21 Savage	10	78	—	—	—	7	6	6	9	Her Loss
"Hours in Silence"	2022	Drake and 21 Savage	13	—	—	—	—	11	9	9	13	Her Loss
"Treacherous Twins"	2022	Drake and 21 Savage	14	—	—	—	—	14	12	11	14	Her Loss
"Pussy & Millions"	2022	Drake and 21 Savage (featuring Travis Scott)	6	5	95	5	—	6	5	5	6	Her Loss
"Broke Boys"	2022	Drake and 21 Savage	12	87	—	—	—	12	10	10	12	Her Loss
"More M's"	2022	Drake and 21 Savage	17	—	—	—	—	18	15	14	28	Her Loss
"Calling for You"	2023	Drake (featuring 21 Savage)	6	17	—	21	—	5	5	5	9	For All the Dogs
"It's Up"	2024	Drake (featuring Young Thug and 21 Savage)	24	—	94	—	82	28	8	6	47	100 Gigs
"B's on the Table"	2026	Drake (featuring 21 Savage)	12	32	—	31	—	12	11	11	15	Iceman
"—" denotes a recording that did not chart or was not released in that territory.

=== Albums ===
List of collaborative albums, with selected chart positions
Title	Album details	Peak chart positions										Sales	Certifications
Title	Album details	CAN	AUS	DEN	FRA	IRE	NZ	NOR	SWE	UK	US	Sales	Certifications
Her Loss	Released: November 4, 2022; Label: OVO, Republic; Format: CD, digital download, streaming	1	2	1	10	2	2	1	2	1	1	US: 20,000	MC: 2× Platinum; ARIA: Gold; IFPI DEN: Gold; BPI: Gold; RIAA: 2× Platinum; RMNZ: Platinum

== See also ==
- 21 Savage discography
- Drake albums discography
- Drake singles discography
- Drake videography
