= Billboard Year-End Hot R&B/Hip-Hop Songs of 2023 =

American music chart

This is a list of Billboard magazine's Top Hot R&B/Hip-Hop Songs of 2023.

No.	Title	Artist(s)
1	"Kill Bill"	SZA
2	"Creepin'"	Metro Boomin, the Weeknd and 21 Savage
3	"Die for You"	The Weeknd featuring Ariana Grande
4	"Snooze"	SZA
5	"Rich Flex"	Drake and 21 Savage
6	"Favorite Song"	Toosii
7	"Sure Thing"	Miguel
8	"All My Life"	Lil Durk featuring J. Cole
9	"Under the Influence"	Chris Brown
10	"FukUMean"	Gunna
11	"Players"	Coi Leray
12	"Cuff It"	Beyoncé
13	"Just Wanna Rock"	Lil Uzi Vert
14	"Superhero (Heroes & Villains)"	Metro Boomin, Future and Chris Brown
15	"Search & Rescue"	Drake
16	"Shirt"	SZA
17	"Bad Habit"	Steve Lacy
18	"Barbie World"	Nicki Minaj and Ice Spice with Aqua
19	"Spin Bout U"	Drake and 21 Savage
20	"Paint the Town Red"	Doja Cat
21	"Tomorrow 2"	GloRilla and Cardi B
22	"Lift Me Up"	Rihanna
23	"Princess Diana"	Ice Spice and Nicki Minaj
24	"What It Is (Block Boy)"	Doechii featuring Kodak Black
25	"Nobody Gets Me"	SZA
26	"Super Freaky Girl"	Nicki Minaj
27	"Area Codes"	Kaliii
28	"Low"	SZA
29	"Put It on da Floor Again"	Latto and Cardi B
30	"Fight the Feeling"	Rod Wave
31	"Peaches & Eggplants"	Young Nudy featuring 21 Savage
32	"Meltdown"	Travis Scott featuring Drake
33	"Slut Me Out"	NLE Choppa
34	"On BS"	Drake and 21 Savage
35	"See You Again"	Tyler, the Creator featuring Kali Uchis
36	"Stand by Me"	Lil Durk featuring Morgan Wallen
37	"Circo Loco"	Drake and 21 Savage
38	"Trance"	Metro Boomin, Travis Scott and Young Thug
39	"Popular"	The Weeknd, Playboi Carti and Madonna
40	"Too Many Nights"	Metro Boomin and Future featuring Don Toliver
41	"Pussy & Millions"	Drake and 21 Savage featuring Travis Scott
42	"I Know?"	Travis Scott
43	"Major Distribution"	Drake and 21 Savage
44	"Freestyle"	Lil Baby
45	"ICU"	Coco Jones
46	"Blind"	SZA
47	"In Ha Mood"	Ice Spice
48	"Shake Sumn"	DaBaby
49	"Red Ruby da Sleeze"	Nicki Minaj
50	"Painting Pictures"	Superstar Pride
51	"Love Language"	SZA
52	"Oh U Went"	Young Thug featuring Drake
53	"Moonlight"	Kali Uchis
54	"FE!N"	Travis Scott featuring Playboi Carti
55	"Forever"	Lil Baby featuring Fridayy
56	"Low Down"	Lil Baby
57	"Telekinesis"	Travis Scott featuring SZA and Future
58	"K-pop"	Travis Scott, Bad Bunny and The Weeknd
59	"Open Arms"	SZA featuring Travis Scott
60	"Johnny Dang"	That Mexican OT, Paul Wall and DRODi
61	"California Breeze"	Lil Baby
62	"Slime You Out"	Drake featuring SZA
63	"Deli"	Ice Spice
64	"Pound Town 2"	Sexyy Red, Tay Keith and Nicki Minaj
65	"Ghost in the Machine"	SZA featuring Phoebe Bridgers
66	"Watch This (ArizonaTears Pluggnb Remix)"	Lil Uzi Vert and ArizonaTears
67	"Don't Play with It"	Lola Brooke featuring Latto and Yung Miami or Billy B
68	"Private Landing"	Don Toliver featuring Justin Bieber and Future
69	"Special"	Lizzo featuring SZA
70	"Good Good"	Usher, Summer Walker and 21 Savage
71	"Shut Up My Moms Calling"	Hotel Ugly
72	"Niagara Falls (Foot or 2)"	Metro Boomin, Travis Scott and 21 Savage
73	"Heyy"	Lil Baby
74	"Jumbotron Shit Poppin"	Drake
75	"Privileged Rappers"	Drake and 21 Savage
76	"The Color Violet"	Tory Lanez
77	"Calling"	Metro Boomin, Swae Lee and Nav featuring A Boogie wit da Hoodie
78	"Seek & Destroy"	SZA
79	"BackOutsideBoyz"	Drake
80	"Back End"	Finesse2tymes
81	"Flooded the Face"	Lil Uzi Vert
82	"Love You Better"	Future
83	"Call Your Friends"	Rod Wave
84	"Jimmy Cooks"	Drake and 21 Savage
85	"Broke Boys"	Drake and 21 Savage
86	"Used"	SZA featuring Don Toliver
87	"Dogtooth"	Tyler, the Creator
88	"Hours In Silence"	Drake and 21 Savage
89	"Billie Eilish"	Armani White
90	"Out the Way"	Yeat
91	"Thang for You"	Rylo Rodriguez featuring NoCap
92	"Bongos"	Cardi B featuring Megan Thee Stallion
93	"SkeeYee"	Sexyy Red
94	"My Eyes"	Travis Scott
95	"Double Fantasy"	The Weeknd featuring Future
96	"Sprinter"	Dave and Central Cee
97	"Endless Fashion"	Lil Uzi Vert featuring Nicki Minaj
98	"Summer Too Hot"	Chris Brown
99	"Topia Twins"	Travis Scott featuring Rob49 and 21 Savage
100	"Annihilate"	Metro Boomin, Swae Lee, Lil Wayne and Offset

== See also ==
- 2023 in music
- Billboard Year-End Hot 100 singles of 2023
- Billboard Year-End Hot Rap Songs of 2023
- List of number-one R&B/hip-hop songs of 2023 (U.S.)
