= List of Billboard Hot 100 top-ten singles in 2022 =

Top ten Billboard songs

This is a list of singles that charted in the top ten of the Billboard Hot 100, an all-genre singles chart in the United States, in 2022. Ninety-two songs were in the top 10 in 2022. Seventy-five songs reached their peak in 2022, five of those songs peaked in 2021, four of those songs peaked in 2023, and eight recurring holiday songs charted in 2022.

== Top-ten singles ==
Key

- ↑ – indicates single's top 10 entry was also its Hot 100 debut
- † – indicates Best performing song of the year
- (#) – 2022 Year-end top 10 single position and rank
- The "weeks in top ten" column reflects each song's entire chart life, not just its run during 2022.

List of Billboard Hot 100 top ten singles that peaked in 2022
Top ten entry date	Single	Artist(s)	Peak	Peak date	Weeks in top ten	Ref.
Singles from 2021
October 2	"Thats What I Want"^{[E]}^{[G]}^{[H]} ↑	Lil Nas X	8	April 2	9	
October 23	"Shivers"^{[B]} (#5)	Ed Sheeran	4	January 15	19	
November 13	"Heat Waves"^{[B]}^{[I]} † (#1)	Glass Animals	1	March 12	37	
Singles from 2022
January 15	"We Don't Talk About Bruno"	Carolina Gaitán, Mauro Castillo, Adassa, Rhenzy Feliz, Diane Guerrero, Stephanie Beatriz and the Encanto cast	1	February 5	13	
January 15	"Cold Heart (Pnau Remix)"^{[F]} (#10)	Elton John and Dua Lipa	7	January 15	6	
January 15	"Super Gremlin" (#9)	Kodak Black	3	March 19	17	
January 22	"Pushin P"^{[E]} ↑	Gunna and Future featuring Young Thug	7	January 22	5	
January 22	"abcdefu"	Gayle	3	March 5	13	
January 29	"Surface Pressure"	Jessica Darrow	8	February 12	4	
February 19	"Do We Have a Problem?" ↑	Nicki Minaj and Lil Baby	2	February 19	1	
February 19	"Ghost" (#8)	Justin Bieber	5	April 2	12	
March 26	"Enemy"	Imagine Dragons and JID	5	April 9	8	
April 2	"Woman"	Doja Cat	7	May 7	6	
April 9	"Big Energy"^{[M]} (#7)	Latto	3	April 9	14	
April 16	"As It Was"^{[T]}^{[U]} ↑ (#2)	Harry Styles	1	April 16	38	
April 23	"First Class" ↑ (#6)	Jack Harlow	1	April 23	18	
April 30	"Don't Think Jesus" ↑	Morgan Wallen	7	April 30	1	
May 14	"Wait for U"^{[R]} ↑	Future featuring Drake and Tems	1	May 14	20	
May 14	"Puffin on Zootiez" ↑	Future	4	May 14	1	
May 14	"712PM" ↑	Future	8	May 14	1	
May 14	"I'm Dat Nigga" ↑	Future	10	May 14	1	
May 21	"Moscow Mule" ↑	Bad Bunny	4	May 21	1	
May 21	"Tití Me Preguntó"^{[K]} ↑	Bad Bunny	5	May 21	5	
May 21	"Después de la Playa" ↑	Bad Bunny	6	May 21	1	
May 21	"About Damn Time"	Lizzo	1	July 30	22	
May 21	"Me Porto Bonito"^{[I]}^{[L]}^{[P]} ↑	Bad Bunny and Chencho Corleone	6	July 23	13	
May 28	"N95" ↑	Kendrick Lamar	3	May 28	1	
May 28	"Die Hard" ↑	Kendrick Lamar, Blxst and Amanda Reifer	5	May 28	1	
May 28	"You Proof"^{[Q]} ↑	Morgan Wallen	5	October 22	10	
May 28	"Silent Hill" ↑	Kendrick Lamar and Kodak Black	7	May 28	1	
May 28	"United in Grief" ↑	Kendrick Lamar	8	May 28	1	
June 4	"Late Night Talking"^{[N]}^{[Q]} ↑	Harry Styles	3	September 17	7	
June 4	"Music for a Sushi Restaurant" ↑	Harry Styles	8	June 4	1	
June 4	"Matilda" ↑	Harry Styles	9	June 4	1	
June 11	"Running Up That Hill (A Deal with God)"	Kate Bush	3	July 30	15	
June 18	"I Like You (A Happier Song)"^{[O]}^{[P]}^{[T]} ↑	Post Malone featuring Doja Cat	3	October 1	13	
June 25	"Glimpse of Us" ↑	Joji	8	July 2	3	
July 2	"Jimmy Cooks" ↑	Drake featuring 21 Savage	1	July 2	5	
July 2	"Sticky" ↑	Drake	6	July 2	1	
July 2	"Falling Back" ↑	Drake	7	July 2	1	
July 9	"Break My Soul"	Beyoncé	1	August 13	10	
August 13	"Bad Habit"^{[T]}^{[U]}	Steve Lacy	1	October 8	18	
August 13	"Sunroof"	Nicky Youre and Dazy	4	September 17	11	
August 20	"Staying Alive" ↑	DJ Khaled featuring Drake and Lil Baby	5	August 20	1	
August 20	"Bad Decisions" ↑	Benny Blanco, BTS and Snoop Dogg	10	August 20	1	
August 27	"Super Freaky Girl"^{[T]} ↑	Nicki Minaj	1	August 27	11	
September 10	"Hold Me Closer" ↑	Elton John and Britney Spears	6	September 10	1	
September 17	"I Ain't Worried"	OneRepublic	6	October 15	7	
October 1	"The Kind of Love We Make"^{[S]}	Luke Combs	8	October 1	3	
October 8	"Unholy"^{[T]} ↑	Sam Smith and Kim Petras	1	October 29	22	
October 8	"Tomorrow 2" ↑	GloRilla and Cardi B	9	October 8	1	
October 22	"Vegas"	Doja Cat	10	October 22	1	
October 29	"California Breeze" ↑	Lil Baby	4	October 29	1	
October 29	"Forever" ↑	Lil Baby featuring Fridayy	8	October 29	1	
October 29	"Real Spill" ↑	Lil Baby	10	October 29	1	
November 5	"Anti-Hero" ↑	Taylor Swift	1	November 5	28	
November 5	"Lavender Haze" ↑	Taylor Swift	2	November 5	2	
November 5	"Maroon" ↑	Taylor Swift	3	November 5	1	
November 5	"Snow on the Beach" ↑	Taylor Swift featuring Lana Del Rey	4	November 5	1	
November 5	"Midnight Rain" ↑	Taylor Swift	5	November 5	2	
November 5	"Bejeweled" ↑	Taylor Swift	6	November 5	2	
November 5	"Question...?" ↑	Taylor Swift	7	November 5	1	
November 5	"You're on Your Own, Kid" ↑	Taylor Swift	8	November 5	1	
November 5	"Vigilante Shit" ↑	Taylor Swift	10	November 5	1	
November 12	"Lift Me Up"^{[U]} ↑	Rihanna	2	November 12	2	
November 19	"Rich Flex" ↑	Drake and 21 Savage	2	November 19	10	
November 19	"Major Distribution" ↑	Drake and 21 Savage	3	November 19	2	
November 19	"On BS" ↑	Drake and 21 Savage	4	November 19	2	
November 19	"Spin Bout U" ↑	Drake and 21 Savage	5	November 19	2	
November 19	"Pussy & Millions" ↑	Drake and 21 Savage featuring Travis Scott	6	November 19	1	
November 19	"Privileged Rappers" ↑	Drake and 21 Savage	7	November 19	1	
November 19	"Circo Loco" ↑	Drake and 21 Savage	8	November 19	1	
November 19	"BackOutsideBoyz" ↑	Drake	9	November 19	1	
December 17	"Superhero (Heroes & Villains)" ↑	Metro Boomin, Future and Chris Brown	8	December 17	1	
December 24	"Nobody Gets Me" ↑	SZA	10	December 24	1	

=== 2021 peaks ===
List of Billboard Hot 100 top ten singles in 2022 that peaked in 2021
Top ten entry date	Single	Artist(s)	Peak	Peak date	Weeks in top ten	Ref.
July 10	"Bad Habits"^{[C]}^{[F]} ↑	Ed Sheeran	2	August 28	26	
July 24	"Stay"^{[J]} ↑ (#3)	The Kid Laroi and Justin Bieber	1	August 14	44	
August 7	"Industry Baby"^{[C]} ↑	Lil Nas X and Jack Harlow	1	October 23	21	
October 30	"Easy on Me" (#4)	Adele	1	October 30	23	
November 6	"Need to Know"^{[C]}^{[D]}	Doja Cat	8	November 13	9	

=== 2023 peaks ===
List of Billboard Hot 100 top ten singles in 2022 that peaked in 2023
Top ten entry date	Single	Artist(s)	Peak	Peak date	Weeks in top ten	Ref.
November 5	"Karma" ↑	Taylor Swift featuring Ice Spice^{1}	2	June 10	8	
November 26	"I'm Good (Blue)"	David Guetta and Bebe Rexha	4	January 14	10	
December 17	"Creepin'" ↑	Metro Boomin, The Weeknd and 21 Savage	3	February 11	27	
December 24	"Kill Bill" ↑	SZA	1	April 29	28	

=== Holiday season ===
Holiday titles first making the Billboard Hot 100 top ten during the 2021–22 holiday season
Top ten entry date	Single	Artist(s)	Peak	Peak date	Weeks in top ten	Ref.
January 1, 2022	"Sleigh Ride"	The Ronettes	8	December 23, 2023	5	

Recurring holiday titles, appearing in the Billboard Hot 100 top ten in previous holiday seasons
Top ten entry date	Single	Artist(s)	Peak	Peak date	Weeks in top ten	Ref.
December 30, 2017	"All I Want for Christmas Is You"^{[V]}	Mariah Carey	1	December 21, 2019	43	
December 29, 2018	"It's the Most Wonderful Time of the Year"^{[W]}^{[X]}	Andy Williams	5	January 2, 2021	24	
January 5, 2019	"Rockin' Around the Christmas Tree"^{[V]}	Brenda Lee	1	December 9, 2023	35	
January 5, 2019	"Jingle Bell Rock"^{[V]}	Bobby Helms	2	December 27, 2025	32	
January 5, 2019	"A Holly Jolly Christmas"^{[V]}	Burl Ives	4	January 4, 2020	26	
December 19, 2020	"Feliz Navidad"^{[A]}^{[Y]}	José Feliciano	6	January 2, 2021	9	
January 2, 2021	"Last Christmas"^{[W]}	Wham!	2	December 13, 2025	22	

=== Notes ===
^{1} Taylor Swift was the sole artist credited on "Karma" when it debuted on November 5, 2022, for its only week in the top ten prior to its return on June 10, 2023. A remix featuring Ice Spice brought the song back to the top ten, and Ice Spice is credited on the song as of June 10, 2023.

^{A} The single re-entered the top ten on the week ending January 1, 2022.
^{B} The single re-entered the top ten on the week ending January 8, 2022.
^{C} The single re-entered the top ten on the week ending January 15, 2022.
^{D} The single re-entered the top ten on the week ending February 12, 2022.
^{E} The single re-entered the top ten on the week ending February 26, 2022.
^{F} The single re-entered the top ten on the week ending March 5, 2022.
^{G} The single re-entered the top ten on the week ending March 19, 2022.
^{H} The single re-entered the top ten on the week ending May 7, 2022.
^{I} The single re-entered the top ten on the week ending June 4, 2022.
^{J} The single re-entered the top ten on the week ending June 11, 2022.
^{K} The single re-entered the top ten on the week ending June 18, 2022.
^{L} The single re-entered the top ten on the week ending July 9, 2022.
^{M} The single re-entered the top ten on the week ending July 16, 2022.
^{N} The single re-entered the top ten on the week ending July 30, 2022.
^{O} The single re-entered the top ten on the week ending August 6, 2022.
^{P} The single re-entered the top ten on the week ending August 27, 2022.
^{Q} The single re-entered the top ten on the week ending September 17, 2022.
^{R} The single re-entered the top ten on the week ending September 24, 2022.
^{S} The single re-entered the top ten on the week ending October 15, 2022.
^{T} The single re-entered the top ten on the week ending November 12, 2022.
^{U} The single re-entered the top ten on the week ending November 26, 2022.
^{V} The single re-entered the top ten on the week ending December 3, 2022.
^{W} The single re-entered the top ten on the week ending December 10, 2022.
^{X} The single re-entered the top ten on the week ending December 24, 2022.
^{Y} The single re-entered the top ten on the week ending December 31, 2022.

== Artists with most top-ten songs ==
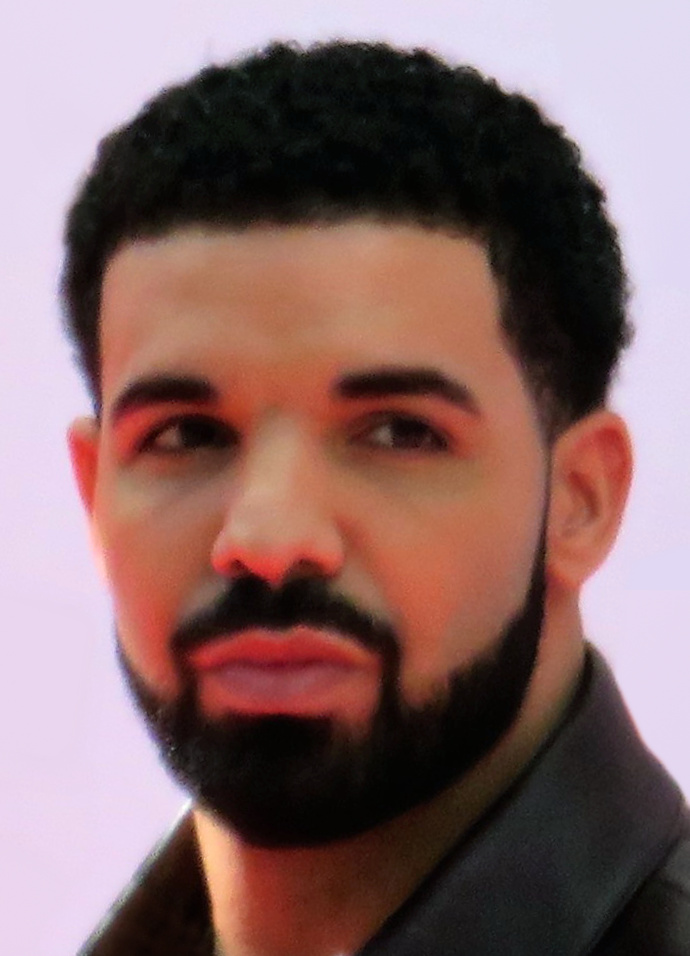
For the third year in a row, Drake (pictured) has scored the most top 10 hits in a calendar year in 2022 with thirteen, matching his record. Eight of which are from his collaborative studio album with rapper 21 Savage, Her Loss. Those eight songs were all in the top ten in the week of November 19.

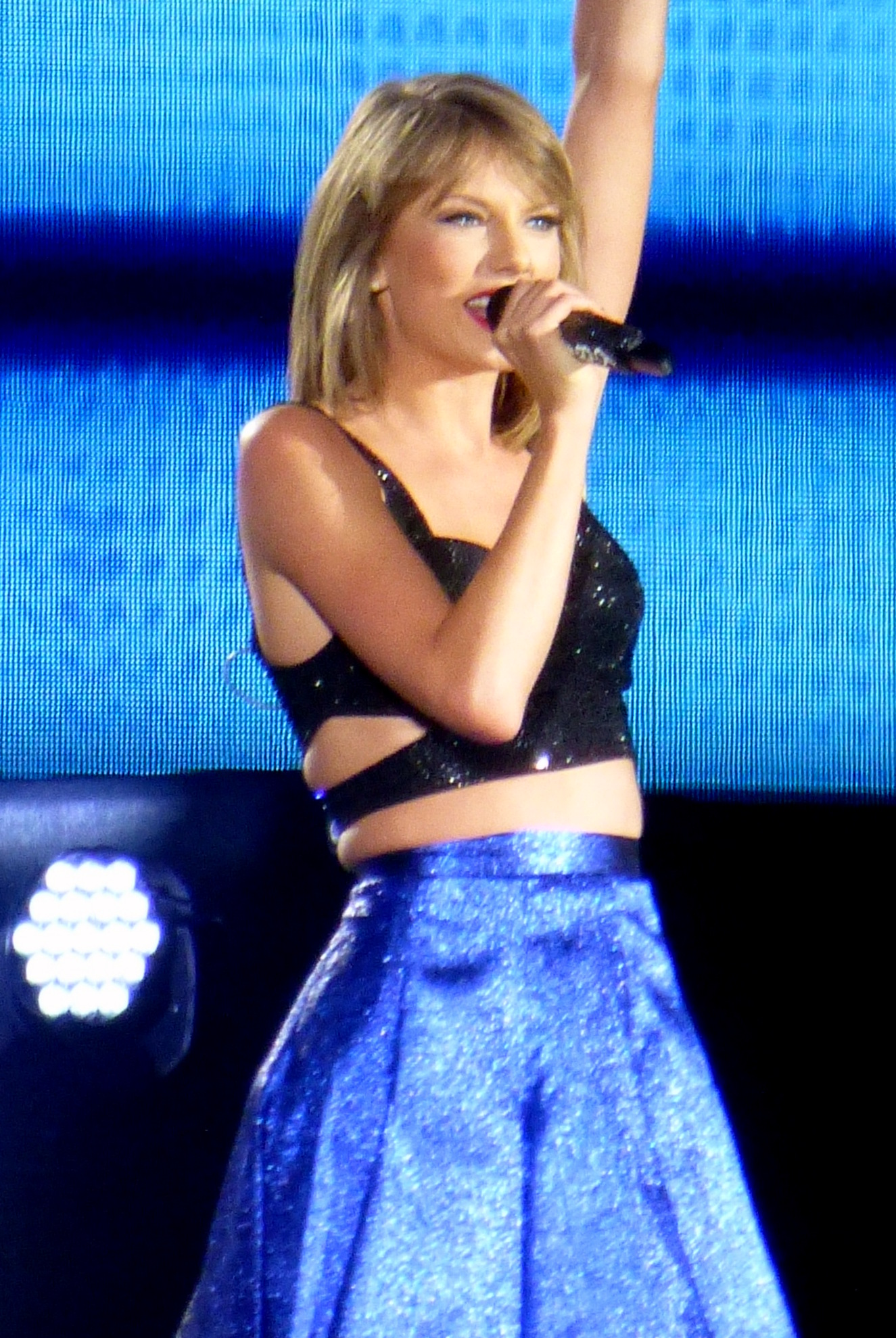
On the week of November 5, Taylor Swift became the first artist to monopolize the entire top ten when she released her tenth studio album Midnights, also breaking the record for most top ten songs from a single album.

List of artists by total songs peaking in the top-ten
Artist	Numbers of songs
Drake	13
Taylor Swift	10
21 Savage	9
Future	6
Lil Baby	5
Bad Bunny	4
Doja Cat	4
Harry Styles	4
Kendrick Lamar	4
Ed Sheeran	2
Elton John	2
Jack Harlow	2
Justin Bieber	2
Lil Nas X	2
Metro Boomin	2
Nicki Minaj	2
SZA	2

== See also ==
- 2022 in American music
- List of Billboard Hot 100 number ones of 2022
- Billboard Year-End Hot 100 singles of 2022
