= It's All a Blur Tour =

2023–2024 concert tour by Drake, 21 Savage, J. Cole & Lil Durk

- Tour by Drake, 21 Savage & J. Cole
- Location: North America
- Associated albums: Her Loss; For All the Dogs
- Start date: July 5, 2023
- End date: April 5, 2024
- Legs: 2
- No. of shows: 80
- Supporting acts: Skillibeng; Sleepy Hallow; Central Cee; Sexyy Red; Zack Bia; Lil Yachty; Lil Durk
- Box office: $320.5 million
Drake tour chronology
Assassination Vacation Tour (2019)	It's All a Blur Tour (2023–2024)	Anita Max Win Tour (2025)
21 Savage tour chronology
The Off-Season Tour (2021)	It's All a Blur Tour (2023)	European Tour (2023)
J. Cole tour chronology
The Off-Season Tour (2021)	It's All a Blur Tour – Big As the What? (2024)	The Fall-Off World Tour (2026)

It's All a Blur Tour was the fifth co-headlining concert tour by Canadian rapper Drake, in support of his first collaborative album with Atlanta-based rapper 21 Savage, Her Loss (2022), and his eighth studio album, For All the Dogs (2023). The tour commenced on July 5, 2023 in Chicago, and its first leg concluded on October 7, in Toronto. Its second leg began on February 2, 2024 in Tampa, and concluded on April 5, in Newark. It was Drake's first North American tour in five years and consisted of 80 shows.

21 Savage joined Drake as the co-headlining act for the first leg of the tour, but was substituted by other artists for the Canadian dates due to his legal travel constraints at the time. J. Cole performed at the shows in Montreal on July 14 and July 15, Travis Scott performed at the shows in Vancouver on August 29 and August 30, and Lil Baby performed at the October 7 show in Toronto. The second American leg of the tour, co-headlined by J. Cole and subtitled It's All a Blur Tour – Big as the What?, saw Lil Wayne being substituted for J. Cole as co-headliner for the final seven dates of the tour, between March 23 and April 5.

Various artists intermittently appeared as the opening act during the first leg: Skillibeng performed on July 8, 2023 in Detroit and July 17 (alongside Sleepy Hallow) and July 20 in Brooklyn; Lil Yachty performed at every show from July 23 until August 1, and on September 1 in Las Vegas; Sexyy Red performed on August 15 in Inglewood and August 25 in Seattle; and Central Cee performed at every show from September 5 until September 23. On the second leg, Lil Durk was the opening act for all shows from February 7, 2024, while Sexyy Red performed on March 6 and March 7 in New Orleans and on March 18 and March 19 in Oklahoma City. Zack Bia also performed on several dates across both legs of the tour.

== Critical reception ==
The tour received highly positive reviews from critics, who praised Drake's energy, stage presence, ability to add unique mixes to old songs, and the theatrics he included between the songs.

Reviewing the tour's opening night in Chicago, Illinois, Grant Rindner for GQ wrote that "the presence of a massive Virgil Abloh statue" was one of the most "poignant" moments of the show. In a review of Drake's performance at the Barclays Center, Ethan Shanfeld of Variety wrote that Drake "treated the arena audience to a nostalgic, high-concept exploration of his greatest hits". In Complex's review of Drake's New York City shows, Jessica McKinney wrote that "the best part of the show was simply seeing Drake for the first time in a very long time", however, "he isn’t as tasteful or visionary when it comes to his live show visuals or aesthetic" and that "the stage props and breaks in the show were unnecessary and made no sense in the show". Eric Skelton wrote that the visuals and theatrics "have been designed to go viral" while Jordan Rose stated that they "add nothing to the show" and that "they feel too over the top".

== Setlist ==
=== Leg 1 ===
Drake

This set list is representative of the songs Drake performed in Chicago on July 5, 2023.

1. "Look What You've Done"
2. "Marvins Room"
3. "Say Something"
4. "Shot for Me"
5. "Can I"
6. "Feel No Ways"
7. "Jaded"
8. "Jungle"
9. "Over"
10. "Headlines"
11. "The Motto"
12. "HYFR (Hell Ya Fucking Right)"
13. "Started from the Bottom"
14. "Energy"
15. "Know Yourself"
16. "Nonstop"
17. "Sicko Mode"
18. "Way 2 Sexy"
19. "BackOutsideBoyz"
20. "Jumbotron Shit Poppin"
21. "Laugh Now Cry Later"
22. "God's Plan"
23. "Child's Play"
24. "Wait for U"
25. "In My Feelings"
26. "Nice for What"
27. "Controlla"
28. "Too Good"
29. "Find Your Love"
30. "Fountains"
31. "Work"
32. "One Dance"
33. "Calling My Name"
34. "Massive"
35. "Sticky"
36. "Search & Rescue"

Encore

37. "Legend"
21 Savage

This set list is representative of the songs 21 Savage performed in Chicago on July 5, 2023.

1. "Red Opps"
2. "Don't Come Out the House"
3. "10 Freaky Girls"
4. "Who Want Smoke??"
5. "Peaches & Eggplants"
6. "Rockstar"
7. "A Lot"
8. "No Heart"
9. "X"
10. "Runnin"
11. "Mr. Right Now"
12. "Bank Account"
Drake & 21 Savage

This set list is representative of the songs Drake & 21 Savage performed in Chicago on July 5, 2023.

1. "Knife Talk"
2. "On BS"
3. "Spin Bout U"
4. "Jimmy Cooks"
5. "Rich Flex"

== Tour dates ==
=== It's All a Blur with 21 Savage (2023) ===
From Billboard and Live Nation Entertainment.

List of concerts, showing date, city, country, venue, opening acts, tickets sold, number of available tickets and gross revenue
Date	City	Country	Venue	Opening acts	Attendance (tickets sold / available)	Revenue
July 5, 2023	Chicago	United States	United Center	Zack Bia	38,299 / 38,299 (100%)	$10,483,961
July 6, 2023	Chicago	United States	United Center	Zack Bia	38,299 / 38,299 (100%)	$10,483,961
July 8, 2023	Detroit	United States	Little Caesars Arena	Zack Bia; Skillibeng	38,949 / 38,949 (100%)	$10,076,745
July 9, 2023	Detroit	United States	Little Caesars Arena	Zack Bia	38,949 / 38,949 (100%)	$10,076,745
July 11, 2023	Boston	United States	TD Garden	Zack Bia	30,393 / 30,393 (100%)	$9,351,208
July 12, 2023	Boston	United States	TD Garden	Zack Bia	30,393 / 30,393 (100%)	$9,351,208
July 14, 2023 (Note: 21 Savage could not appear at Canadian shows at the time for legal reasons and was substituted by other artists. In Montreal, he was replaced by J. Cole, in Vancouver, he was replaced by Travis Scott, and in Toronto, he was replaced by Lil Baby.)	Montreal	Canada	Bell Centre	Zack Bia	37,568 / 37,568 (100%)	$7,666,849
July 15, 2023	Montreal	Canada	Bell Centre	Zack Bia	37,568 / 37,568 (100%)	$7,666,849
July 17, 2023	New York City	United States	Barclays Center	Zack Bia; Skillibeng; Sleepy Hallow	64,747 / 64,747 (100%)	$18,017,102
July 18, 2023	New York City	United States	Barclays Center	Zack Bia	64,747 / 64,747 (100%)	$18,017,102
July 20, 2023	New York City	United States	Barclays Center	Zack Bia; Skillibeng	64,747 / 64,747 (100%)	$18,017,102
July 21, 2023	New York City	United States	Barclays Center	Zack Bia	64,747 / 64,747 (100%)	$18,017,102
July 23, 2023	New York City	United States	Madison Square Garden	Zack Bia; Lil Yachty	51,679 / 51,679 (100%)	$13,986,183
July 25, 2023	New York City	United States	Madison Square Garden	Zack Bia; Lil Yachty	51,679 / 51,679 (100%)	$13,986,183
July 26, 2023	New York City	United States	Madison Square Garden	Zack Bia; Lil Yachty	51,679 / 51,679 (100%)	$13,986,183
July 28, 2023	Washington, D.C.	United States	Capital One Arena	Zack Bia; Lil Yachty	34,303 / 34,303 (100%)	$10,064,416
July 29, 2023	Washington, D.C.	United States	Capital One Arena	Zack Bia; Lil Yachty	34,303 / 34,303 (100%)	$10,064,416
July 31, 2023	Philadelphia	United States	Wells Fargo Center	Zack Bia; Lil Yachty	34,720 / 34,720 (100%)	$8,818,267
August 1, 2023	Philadelphia	United States	Wells Fargo Center	Zack Bia; Lil Yachty	34,720 / 34,720 (100%)	$8,818,267
August 4, 2023	Milwaukee	United States	Fiserv Forum	Zack Bia; Lil Yachty	15,592 / 15,592 (100%)	$3,762,702
August 12, 2023	Inglewood	United States	Kia Forum	Zack Bia	66,229 / 66,229 (100%)	$20,221,951
August 13, 2023	Inglewood	United States	Kia Forum	Zack Bia	66,229 / 66,229 (100%)	$20,221,951
August 15, 2023	Inglewood	United States	Kia Forum	Zack Bia; Sexyy Red	66,229 / 66,229 (100%)	$20,221,951
August 16, 2023	Inglewood	United States	Kia Forum	Zack Bia	66,229 / 66,229 (100%)	$20,221,951
August 18, 2023	San Francisco	United States	Chase Center	Zack Bia	31,177 / 31,177 (100%)	$7,889,736
August 19, 2023	San Francisco	United States	Chase Center	Zack Bia	31,177 / 31,177 (100%)	$7,889,736
August 21, 2023	Los Angeles	United States	Crypto.com Arena	Zack Bia; Sexyy Red	31,184 / 31,184 (100%)	$7,496,333
August 22, 2023	Los Angeles	United States	Crypto.com Arena	Zack Bia	31,184 / 31,184 (100%)	$7,496,333
August 25, 2023	Seattle	United States	Climate Pledge Arena	Zack Bia; Sexyy Red	31,377 / 31,377 (100%)	$9,285,492
August 26, 2023	Seattle	United States	Climate Pledge Arena	Zack Bia	31,377 / 31,377 (100%)	$9,285,492
August 29, 2023	Vancouver	Canada	Rogers Arena	Zack Bia	33,563 / 33,563 (100%)	$7,474,623
August 30, 2023	Vancouver	Canada	Rogers Arena	Zack Bia	33,563 / 33,563 (100%)	$7,474,623
September 1, 2023	Las Vegas	United States	T-Mobile Arena	Zack Bia; Lil Yachty	33,024 / 33,024 (100%)	$8,349,542
September 2, 2023	Las Vegas	United States	T-Mobile Arena	Zack Bia	33,024 / 33,024 (100%)	$8,349,542
September 5, 2023	Glendale	United States	Desert Diamond Arena	Zack Bia; Central Cee	31,258 / 31,258 (100%)	$8,252,926
September 6, 2023	Glendale	United States	Desert Diamond Arena	Zack Bia; Central Cee	31,258 / 31,258 (100%)	$8,252,926
September 11, 2023	Austin	United States	Moody Center	Zack Bia; Central Cee	27,605 / 27,605 (100%)	$6,476,234
September 12, 2023	Austin	United States	Moody Center	Zack Bia; Central Cee	27,605 / 27,605 (100%)	$6,476,234
September 14, 2023	Dallas	United States	American Airlines Center	Zack Bia; Central Cee	32,478 / 32,478 (100%)	$10,121,293
September 15, 2023	Dallas	United States	American Airlines Center	Zack Bia; Central Cee	32,478 / 32,478 (100%)	$10,121,293
September 17, 2023	Houston	United States	Toyota Center	Zack Bia; Central Cee	31,849 / 31,849 (100%)	$9,017,592
September 18, 2023	Houston	United States	Toyota Center	Zack Bia; Central Cee	31,849 / 31,849 (100%)	$9,017,592
September 22, 2023	Charlotte	United States	Spectrum Center	Zack Bia; Central Cee	33,084 / 33,084 (100%)	$5,960,871
September 23, 2023	Charlotte	United States	Spectrum Center	Zack Bia; Central Cee	33,084 / 33,084 (100%)	$5,960,871
September 25, 2023	Atlanta	United States	State Farm Arena	Zack Bia	32,257 / 32,257 (100%)	$8,051,818
September 26, 2023	Atlanta	United States	State Farm Arena	Zack Bia	32,257 / 32,257 (100%)	$8,051,818
September 28, 2023	Miami	United States	Kaseya Center	Zack Bia	34,991 / 34,991 (100%)	$8,462,707
September 29, 2023	Miami	United States	Kaseya Center	Zack Bia	34,991 / 34,991 (100%)	$8,462,707
October 6, 2023	Toronto	Canada	Scotiabank Arena	Zack Bia	34,290 / 34,290 (100%)	$6,644,203
October 7, 2023	Toronto	Canada	Scotiabank Arena	Zack Bia	34,290 / 34,290 (100%)	$6,644,203
Total					830,611	$215,932,754

=== Big as the What? with J. Cole (2024) ===
From Pitchfork.

List of concerts, showing date, city, country, venue, opening acts, tickets sold, number of available tickets and gross revenue
Date	City	Country	Venue	Opening acts	Attendance (tickets sold / available)	Revenue
February 2, 2024	Tampa	United States	Amalie Arena	Zack Bia	32,877 / 32,877 (100%)	$8,130,593
February 4, 2024	Tampa	United States	Amalie Arena	Zack Bia	32,877 / 32,877 (100%)	$8,130,593
February 7, 2024	Nashville	United States	Bridgestone Arena	Lil Durk	32,797 / 32,797 (100%)	$6,559,349
February 8, 2024	Nashville	United States	Bridgestone Arena	Lil Durk	32,797 / 32,797 (100%)	$6,559,349
February 12, 2024	St. Louis	United States	Enterprise Center	Lil Durk	30,938 / 30,938 (100%)	$6,022,348
February 13, 2024	St. Louis	United States	Enterprise Center	Lil Durk	30,938 / 30,938 (100%)	$6,022,348
February 16, 2024	Pittsburgh	United States	PPG Paints Arena	Lil Durk	33,639 / 33,639 (100%)	$7,071,409
February 17, 2024	Pittsburgh	United States	PPG Paints Arena	Lil Durk	33,639 / 33,639 (100%)	$7,071,409
February 20, 2024	Columbus	United States	Schottenstein Center	Lil Durk	32,924 / 32,924 (100%)	$6,823,669
February 21, 2024	Columbus	United States	Schottenstein Center	Lil Durk	32,924 / 32,924 (100%)	$6,823,669
February 24, 2024	Cleveland	United States	Rocket Mortgage FieldHouse	Lil Durk	33,855 / 33,855 (100%)	$7,338,578
February 25, 2024	Cleveland	United States	Rocket Mortgage FieldHouse	Lil Durk	33,855 / 33,855 (100%)	$7,338,578
February 27, 2024	Buffalo	United States	KeyBank Center	Zack Bia	33,480 / 33,480 (100%)	$7,340,894
February 28, 2024	Buffalo	United States	KeyBank Center	Zack Bia	33,480 / 33,480 (100%)	$7,340,894
March 2, 2024	Kansas City	United States	T-Mobile Center	Zack Bia	34,481 / 34,481 (100%)	$6,244,509
March 3, 2024	Kansas City	United States	T-Mobile Center	Zack Bia	34,481 / 34,481 (100%)	$6,244,509
March 6, 2024	New Orleans	United States	Smoothie King Center	Zack Bia; Sexyy Red	32,969 / 32,969 (100%)	$6,027,209
March 7, 2024	New Orleans	United States	Smoothie King Center	Zack Bia; Sexyy Red	32,969 / 32,969 (100%)	$6,027,209
March 10, 2024	Lexington	United States	Rupp Arena	Lil Durk	19,087 / 19,087 (100%)	$4,437,184
March 14, 2024	San Antonio	United States	Frost Bank Center	Lil Durk	34,363 / 34,363 (100%)	$6,749,136
March 15, 2024	San Antonio	United States	Frost Bank Center	Lil Durk	34,363 / 34,363 (100%)	$6,749,136
March 18, 2024	Oklahoma City	United States	Paycom Center	Zack Bia; Sexyy Red	32,003 / 32,003 (100%)	$6,197,396
March 19, 2024	Oklahoma City	United States	Paycom Center	Zack Bia; Sexyy Red	32,003 / 32,003 (100%)	$6,197,396
March 23, 2024	Sunrise (Note: Without J. Cole, Lil Wayne serving as substitute co-headliner)	United States	Amerant Bank Arena	Lil Durk	32,969 / 32,969 (100%)	$7,179,517
March 24, 2024	Sunrise	United States	Amerant Bank Arena	Lil Durk	32,969 / 32,969 (100%)	$7,179,517
March 28, 2024	Elmont	United States	UBS Arena	Lil Durk	30,753 / 30,753 (100%)	$7,560,272
March 29, 2024	Elmont	United States	UBS Arena	Lil Durk	30,753 / 30,753 (100%)	$7,560,272
March 31, 2024	University Park	United States	Bryce Jordan Center	Lil Durk	16,361 / 16,361 (100%)	$4,072,988
April 4, 2024	Newark	United States	Prudential Center	Lil Durk	31,264 / 31,264 (100%)	$6,825,634
April 5, 2024	Newark	United States	Prudential Center	Lil Durk	31,264 / 31,264 (100%)	$6,825,634
Total					494,760	$104,580,685

=== Cancelled shows ===
List of cancelled concerts, showing date, city, country, venue, and reason for cancellation
Date	City	Country	Venue	Reason
July 1, 2023	Columbus	United States	Schottenstein Center	Rescheduled to October 9 before being ultimately cancelled
October 9, 2023	Columbus	United States	Schottenstein Center	Scheduling conflict
August 6, 2023 (Note: Originally scheduled for June 29.)	Memphis	United States	FedExForum	Production and logistical issues
April 8, 2024	Memphis	United States	FedExForum	Unknown
August 28, 2023	Vancouver	Canada	Rogers Arena	Videoboard issues; rescheduled to August 30
October 1, 2023 (Note: Originally scheduled for June 19.)	Nashville	United States	Bridgestone Arena	Unknown
October 2, 2023	Nashville	United States	Bridgestone Arena	Unknown
March 27, 2024	Birmingham	United States	Legacy Arena	Unknown
April 15, 2024	Denver	United States	Ball Arena	Unknown
April 16, 2024	Denver	United States	Ball Arena	Unknown
