= Drake videography =

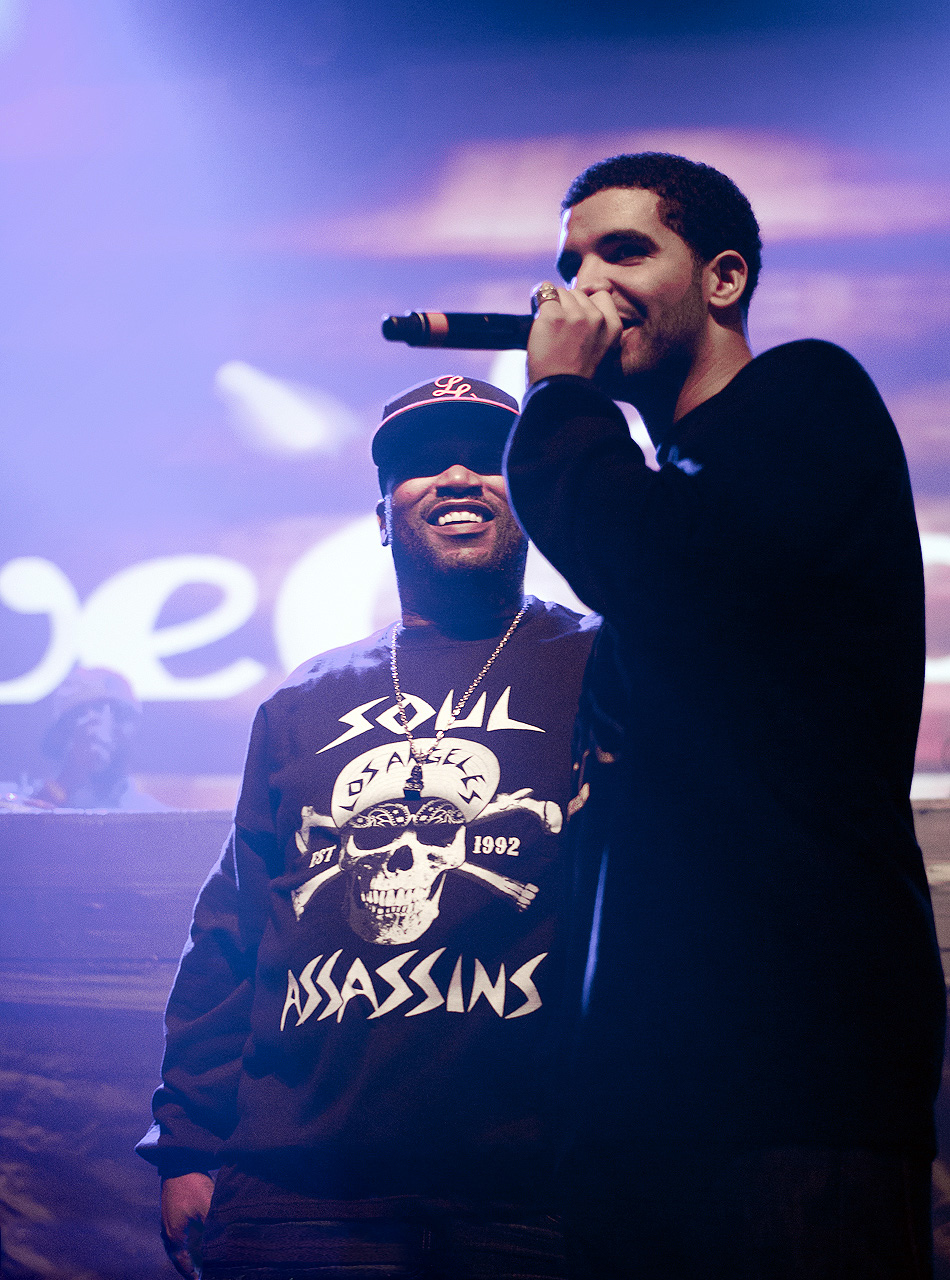
Drake performing in 2011

The following list contains the videography for Drake, including his own music videos and videos that feature him. The first video Drake ever appeared in was Jenna's music video for her single "Change You" released in 2006.

== Music videos ==
=== As lead artist ===
List of music videos as lead artist, with directors, showing year released
Title	Year	Director(s)
"Replacement Girl" (featuring Trey Songz)	2007	Shane Stirling
"Best I Ever Had"	2009	Kanye West
"Successful" (featuring Trey Songz)	2009	Jake White
"Forever" (with Kanye West, Lil Wayne and Eminem)	2009	Hype Williams
"Over"	2010	Anthony Mandler
"Find Your Love"	2010	Anthony Mandler
"Miss Me" (featuring Lil Wayne)	2010	Anthony Mandler
"Marvins Room"	2011	Lamar Taylor, Hyghly Alleyne
"Headlines"	2011	Lamar Taylor, J. Maylen, Al Mukadem
"The Motto" (featuring Lil Wayne and Tyga)	2011	Lamar Taylor, Hyghly Alleyne
"Practice"	2012	—N/a
"Take Care" (featuring Rihanna)	2012	Yoann Lemoine
"HYFR (Hell Ya Fucking Right)" (featuring Lil Wayne)	2012	Director X
"Started from the Bottom"	2013	Director X
"5AM in Toronto"	2013	Ram Accoumeh, Andrew Hamilton
"Hold On, We're Going Home" (featuring Majid Jordan)	2013	Bill Pope
"Worst Behavior"	2013	Drake, Director X
"We'll Be Fine"	2014	Mikael Columbu
"Jungle"	2015	Swiss Karim Huu Do
"Energy"	2015	Fleur & Manu
"Hotline Bling"	2015	Director X
"Childs Play"	2016	Drake, Carlos "Spiff TV" Suarez
"Please Forgive Me"	2016	Anthony Mandler
"Sneakin'" (featuring 21 Savage)	2016	GAB3
"No Frauds" (with Nicki Minaj and Lil Wayne)	2017	Benny Boom
"Gyalchester"	2017	N/A
"God's Plan"	2018	Karena Evans
"Bring It Back" (with Trouble and Mike Will Made It)	2018	Derek Schklar
"Nice For What"	2018	Karena Evans
"I'm Upset"	2018	Karena Evans
"Nonstop"	2018	Theo Skudra
"In My Feelings"	2018	Karena Evans
"Money in the Grave" (featuring Rick Ross)	2019	Theo Skudra
"War"	2019	Theo Skudra
"When to Say When & Chicago Freestyle"	2020	Theo Skudra
"Toosie Slide"	2020	Theo Skudra
"Only You Freestyle" (with Headie One)	2020	Nathan James Tettey
"Laugh Now Cry Later" (featuring Lil Durk)	2020	Dave Meyers
"What's Next"	2021	Theo Skudra
"Way 2 Sexy" (featuring Future & Young Thug)	2021	Dave Meyers
"Knife Talk" (featuring 21 Savage & Project Pat)	2021	Pablo Rochat
"Falling Back"	2022	Director X
"Sticky"	2022	Theo Skudra
"Jimmy Cooks" (featuring 21 Savage)	2022	Mahfuz Sultan & Anthony Bishop
"Jumbotron Shit Poppin"	2023	Tristan C-M
"Spin Bout U" (with 21 Savage)	2023	Dave Meyers
"8AM in Charlotte"	2023	Zong Li
"Another Late Night" (featuring Lil Yachty)	2023	Cole Bennett
"First Person Shooter" (featuring J. Cole)	2023	Gibson Hazard
"Polar Opposites"	2023	Zong Li
"You Broke My Heart"	2023	Theo Skudra
"Rich Baby Daddy" (featuring SZA & Sexy Redd)	2024	Drake
"Family Matters"	2024	Drake
"Nokia"	2025	Theo Skudra

=== Collaboration videos ===
List of music videos, with directors, showing year released
Title	Year	Director(s)
"Every Girl" (with Young Money)	2009	—N/a
"BedRock" (with Young Money)	2009	Dayo
"Wavin' Flag" (with Young Artists for Haiti)	2010	—N/a

=== Cameo appearances ===
List of music videos, with directors, showing year released
Title	Year	Director(s)
"Wonder Woman" (Trey Songz)	2007	Lil X
"Epiphany" (Chrisette Michele)	2009	Ray Kay
"Brand New" (Trey Songz)	2009	Yolande Geralds, Delante Murphy
"Pursuit of Happiness" (Kid Cudi featuring MGMT and Ratatat)	2009	Brody Baker
"Baby" (Justin Bieber featuring Ludacris)	2010	Ray Kay
"Loyalty" (Birdman featuring Tyga and Lil Wayne)	2010	David Rousseau
"I'm On It" (Tyga featuring Lil Wayne)	2010	Colin Tilley
"330" (Stalley)	2011	Illusive Media
"Take It to the Head" (DJ Khaled featuring Chris Brown, Rick Ross, Nicki Minaj and Lil Wayne)	2012	Colin Tilley
"Power Circle" (Gunplay, Stalley, Wale, Meek Mill and Rick Ross featuring Kendrick Lamar)	2012	Dre Films
"Anaconda" (Nicki Minaj)	2014	Colin Tilley
"Reminder" (The Weeknd)	2017	Kid Studio
"Live Up To My Name" (Baka Not Nice)	2017	TheBoy, Niko, EdisonSigua

=== As featured artist ===
List of music videos, with directors, showing year released
Title	Year	Director(s)
"Change You" (Jenna featuring Drake)	2006	—N/a
"The One" (Mary J. Blige featuring Drake)	2009	Anthony Mandler
"Money to Blow" (Birdman featuring Lil Wayne and Drake)	2009	Gil Green
"Fed Up" (DJ Khaled featuring Usher, Young Jeezy, Rick Ross and Drake)	2009	Gil Green
"Still Fly" (Page featuring Drake)	2009	—N/a
"Digital Girl" (Remix) (Jamie Foxx featuring Kanye West, The-Dream and Drake)	2009	Hype Williams
"Say Something" (Timbaland featuring Drake)	2009	Paul Coy Allen
"4 My Town (Play Ball)" (Birdman featuring Lil Wayne and Drake)	2009	Gil Green
"Aston Martin Music" (Rick Ross featuring Chrisette Michele and Drake)	2010	Gil Green
"Loving You No More" (Diddy-Dirty Money featuring Drake)	2010	Gil Green
"What's My Name?" (Rihanna featuring Drake)	2010	Philip Andelman
"Fall For Your Type" (Jamie Foxx featuring Drake)	2010	Chris Robinson
"Put It Down" (Bun B featuring Drake)	2010	Mr. Boomtown
"Moment 4 Life" (Nicki Minaj featuring Drake)	2011	Chris Robinson
"In the Morning" (J. Cole featuring Drake)	2011	—N/a
"Made Men" (Rick Ross featuring Drake)	2011	Dre Films
"I'm on One" (DJ Khaled featuring Rick Ross, Lil Wayne and Drake)	2011	Gil Green
"Stay Schemin'" (Rick Ross featuring French Montana and Drake)	2012	Spiff TV
"Mr. Wrong" (Mary J. Blige featuring Drake)	2012	Diane Martel
"Round of Applause" (Waka Flocka Flame featuring Drake)	2012	Mr. Boomtown
"So Good" (Shanell featuring Lil Wayne and Drake)	2012	Director X
"No Lie" (2 Chainz featuring Drake)	2012	Director X
"Pop That" (French Montana featuring Rick Ross, Lil Wayne and Drake)	2012	Parris
"Amen" (Meek Mill featuring Drake)	2012	Dre Films
"Diced Pineapples" (Rick Ross featuring Wale and Drake)	2012	Director X
"The Zone" (The Weeknd featuring Drake)	2012	Abel Tesfaye
"Fuckin' Problems" (ASAP Rocky featuring 2 Chainz, Kendrick Lamar and Drake)	2012	Sam Lecca, Clark Jackson
"Love Me" (Lil Wayne featuring Future and Drake)	2013	Hannah Lux Davis
"Poetic Justice" (Kendrick Lamar featuring Drake)	2013	The Lil Homie, Dee.Jay.Dave, Dangerookipawaa
"No Guns Allowed" (Snoop Lion featuring Cori B and Drake)	2013	Jesse Terrero
"No New Friends" (DJ Khaled featuring Rick Ross, Lil Wayne and Drake)	2013	Colin Tilley
"Live For" (The Weeknd featuring Drake)	2013	Sam Pilling
"Mine" (Beyoncé featuring Drake)	2013	Pierre Debusschere
"Who Do You Love" (YG featuring Drake)	2014	Benny Boom
"DnF" (P Reign featuring Future and Drake)	2014	Davin Black and Drake
"Only" (Nicki Minaj featuring Lil' Wayne, Chris Brown and Drake)	2014	Hannah Lux Davis
"Grindin" (Lil' Wayne featuring Drake)	2014	DJ Scoob Doo
"Recognize" (PartyNextDoor featuring Drake)	2014	Liam MacRae
"Tuesday (Remix)" (iLoveMakonnen featuring Drake)	2014	Goodwin
"Blessings" (Big Sean featuring Drake and Kanye West)	2015	Darren Craig
"100" (The Game featuring Drake)	2015	—N/a
"Where Ya At" (Future featuring Drake)	2015	Rick Nyce
"Work" (Rihanna featuring Drake)	2016	Director X
"My Love" (Majid Jordan featuring Drake)	2016	Common Good
"No Shopping" (French Montana featuring Drake)	2016	Spiff TV
"Why You Always Hatin?" (YG featuring Drake & Kamaiyah)	2016	Psycho Films
"Used to This" (Future featuring Drake)	2016	—N/a
"Look Alive" (BlocBoy JB featuring Drake)	2018	Frederick Ali
"Walk It Talk It" (Migos featuring Drake)	2018	Daps and Quavo
"Sicko Mode" (Travis Scott featuring Drake)	2018	Dave Meyers
"Mia" (Bad Bunny featuring Drake)	2018	Fernando Lugo
"No Stylist" (French Montana featuring Drake)	2018	Glenn Michael and Christo
"Going Bad" (Meek Mill featuring Drake)	2019	Kid Art
"No Guidance" (Chris Brown featuring Drake)	2019	Chris Robinson
"Life Is Good" (Future featuring Drake)	2020	Director X
"Loyal" (PartyNextDoor featuring Drake)	2020	N/A
"Oprah's Bank Account" (Lil Yachty featuring DaBaby and Drake)	2020	Director X
"Popstar" (DJ Khaled featuring Drake)	2020	Director X
"Churchill Downs" (Jack Harlow featuring Drake)	2022	Jack, Gus, Jamie, & Brian Campbell
"Staying Alive" (DJ Khaled featuring Drake & Lil Baby)	2022	
"We Caa Done" (Popcaan featuring Drake)	2023	
"Oh U Went" (Young Thug featuring Drake)	2023	

== See also ==
- Drake albums discography
- Drake singles discography
