= 2023 BET Hip Hop Awards =

Annual edition of the awards show

- Date: October 10, 2023
- Location: Cobb Energy Performing Arts Centre, Atlanta, Georgia
- Hosted by: Fat Joe
- Most awards: Kendrick Lamar (4)
- Most nominations: Cardi B and 21 Savage (12)

Television/radio coverage
- Network: BET

The 2023 BET Hip Hop Awards were held on October 3, 2023, as the 17th installment of the BET Hip Hop Awards, intended to recognize the best in hip hop music of 2023. The ceremony was taped in Atlanta, Georgia on October 3, and broadcast on BET the following week on October 10. The awards were hosted by Fat Joe.

The nominations were announced on September 7, 2023; Cardi B and 21 Savage both led with twelve each, followed by Drake with nine. Kendrick Lamar won the most awards at the ceremony, with four. Swizz Beatz and Timbaland were recognized with the Cultural Influence Award, and Marley Marl was honored with the I Am Hip Hop award.

== Nominees ==
=== Hip Hop Artist of the Year ===
- Kendrick Lamar
- 21 Savage
- Burna Boy
- Drake
- GloRilla
- J. Cole
- Lil Uzi Vert

=== Hip Hop Album of the Year ===
- Her Loss – Drake & 21 Savage
- Anyways, Life's Great – GloRilla
- Coi – Coi Leray
- God Did – DJ Khaled
- Heroes & Villains – Metro Boomin
- Jackman – Jack Harlow
- Pink Tape – Lil Uzi Vert
- Traumazine – Megan Thee Stallion

=== Best Hip Hop Video ===
- "Just Wanna Rock" – Lil Uzi Vert
- "Players" (DJ Smallz 732 – Jersey Club Remix) – Coi Leray
- "Put It on da Floor Again" – Latto featuring Cardi B
- "Shake Sumn" – DaBaby
- "Sittin' on Top of the World" – Burna Boy featuring 21 Savage
- "Spin Bout U" – Drake & 21 Savage
- "Tomorrow 2" – GloRilla & Cardi B

=== Best Collaboration ===
- "All My Life" – Lil Durk featuring J. Cole
- "God Did" – DJ Khaled featuring Rick Ross, Lil Wayne, Jay-Z, John Legend & Fridayy
- "Players" (DJ Saige Remix) – Coi Leray featuring Busta Rhymes
- "Princess Diana" – Ice Spice & Nicki Minaj
- "Put It on da Floor Again" – Latto featuring Cardi B
- "Sittin' on Top of the World" – Burna Boy featuring 21 Savage
- "Tomorrow 2" – GloRilla & Cardi B

=== Best Duo/Group ===
- Drake & 21 Savage
- City Girls
- DJ Drama & Jeezy
- EarthGang
- Larry June & The Alchemist
- Quavo & Takeoff
- Rae Sremmurd

=== Best Live Performer ===
- Kendrick Lamar
- Burna Boy
- Busta Rhymes
- Cardi B
- Coi Leray
- DaBaby
- Drake
- Megan Thee Stallion

=== Lyricist of the Year ===
- Kendrick Lamar
- 21 Savage
- André 3000
- Burna Boy
- Cardi B
- Conway the Machine
- Drake
- J. Cole

=== Video Director of the Year ===
- Dave Free & Kendrick Lamar
- Anderson .Paak
- Cole Bennett
- Colin Tilley
- DaBaby & Reel Goats
- Dave Meyers
- Travis Scott

=== DJ of the Year ===
- Metro Boomin
- Chase B
- D-Nice
- DJ Cassidy
- DJ Clark Kent
- DJ Drama
- DJ Jazzy Jeff
- DJ Khaled
- Kaytranada

=== Producer of the Year ===
- Metro Boomin
- ATL Jacob
- DJ Khaled
- Dr. Dre
- Hit-Boy
- Hitmaka
- Kaytranada
- London on da Track
- The Alchemist

=== Song of the Year ===
- "Just Wanna Rock" – Lil Uzi Vert
- "All My Life" – Lil Durk featuring J. Cole
- "God Did" – DJ Khaled featuring Rick Ross, Lil Wayne, Jay-Z, John Legend & Fridayy
- "Players" – Coi Leray
- "Put It on da Floor Again" – Latto featuring Cardi B
- "Rich Flex" – Drake & 21 Savage
- "Sittin' on Top of the World" – Burna Boy featuring 21 Savage
- "Tomorrow 2" – GloRilla & Cardi B

=== Best Breakthrough Hip Hop Artist ===
- Ice Spice
- Armani White
- Central Cee
- Doechii
- Finesse2tymes
- Kaliii
- Lola Brooke
- Sexyy Red

=== Hustler of the Year ===
- 50 Cent
- 21 Savage
- Burna Boy
- Cardi B
- Caresha
- DJ Khaled
- Drake
- Jay-Z

=== Sweet 16: Best Featured Verse ===
- Jay Z – "God Did" (DJ Khaled featuring Rick Ross, Lil Wayne, Jay-Z, John Legend & Fridayy)
- 21 Savage – "Creepin'" – (Metro Boomin featuring The Weeknd & 21 Savage)
- 21 Savage – "Peaches & Eggplants" (Young Nudy featuring 21 Savage)
- André 3000 – "Scientists & Engineers" (Killer Mike & André 3000 featuring Future & Eryn Allen Kane)
- Cardi B – "Tomorrow 2" (GloRilla & Cardi B)
- Cardi B – "Put It on da Floor Again" (Latto featuring Cardi B)
- Drake – "Oh U Went" (Young Thug featuring Drake)
- J. Cole – "All My Life" (Lil Durk featuring J. Cole)

=== Impact Track ===
- "All My Life" – Lil Durk featuring J. Cole
- "30" – Nas
- "Anxiety" – Megan Thee Stallion
- "Can't Win for Nothing" – Symba
- "Champions" – NLE Choppa
- "God Did" – DJ Khaled featuring Rick Ross, Lil Wayne, Jay-Z, John Legend & Fridayy
- "Scientists & Engineers" – Killer Mike & André 3000 featuring Future & Eryn Allen Kane
- "Therapy Pt. 2" – Robert Glasper featuring Mac Miller

=== Best Hip-Hop Platform ===
- Caresha Please
- AllHipHop
- Drink Champs
- HipHopDX
- Million Dollaz Worth of Game
- Rap Caviar
- The Breakfast Club
- The Joe Budden Podcast
- XXL

=== Best International Flow ===
- Black Sherif (Ghana)
- AKA (South Africa)
- Central Cee (UK)
- Gazo (France)
- J Hus (UK)
- K.O (South Africa)
- Major Rd (Brazil)
- Ninho (France)
- Sampa the Great (Zambia)
- Tasha & Tracie (Brazil)

=== I Am Hip-Hop Award ===
- Marley Marl

=== Cultural Influence Award ===
- Swizz Beatz & Timbaland
