= B's on the Table =

2026 song by Drake featuring 21 Savage

Song by Drake featuring 21 Savage

from the album Iceman
- Released: May 15, 2026
- Genre: Hip-hop
- Length: 2:17
- Label: OVO; Republic
- Producers: London Cyr; O Lil Angel; Rogét Chahayed; Dylan Hyde; Jeek; B4U

Music video
- "B's on the Table" on YouTube

"B's on the Table" is a song by the Canadian rapper Drake featuring his frequent collaborator, the British-American rapper 21 Savage. It was released on May 15, 2026, from Drake's album Iceman.

== Background and composition ==
21 Savage performs only on the chorus. Drake references his dismissed lawsuit against Universal Music Group—in which he had accused the record label of defaming him through its support of rapper Kendrick Lamar during their feud—stating that he is "fightin' the man, not suin' the rapper". The line has been considered a "riposte" to the people that mocked him over the lawsuit.

== Critical reception ==
The song received generally mixed reviews. Michael Saponara of Billboard ranked it as the 17th best song on Iceman, considering 21 Savage's contribution to only the hook was a "nice change of pace" between Drake's verses. He commented the song "doesn't reach the heights of their best collaborations but it may be the most potent given what Drizzy is spitting about." Alexander Cole of HotNewHipHop wrote, "This song contains some solid rapping from both, though some might feel the 21 feature misses the mark. After all, we have heard these two do better in the past." Clash's Joe Simpson believed the song has "promise" but feels "unfinished", while The Guardian's Alexis Petridis considered the song filler and commented, "21 Savage sounds as if he's bored out of his mind."

Pitchfork's Jayson Greene described Drake's lyrics about his lawsuit as "an awkward position to take when he himself is facing multiple allegations of bot-farming and stream inflation." Paul Attard of Slant Magazine stated "By the time a checked-out 21 Savage shows up on 'B's on the Table,' you stop caring which enemy is being coyly dragged and start wishing Drake would find a new emotional setting beyond aggrieved self-pity." AllMusic opined that the song had one of the "more interesting" hooks on the album.

== Music video ==
The music video for the song was released on May 15, 2026. It features performer Casper, who is shown scaling the CN Tower, while Drake briefly performs on a crane inside the tower. Drake later stated that he felt nauseous during the shoot.

== Charts ==
Chart performance for "B's on the Table"
| Chart (2026) | Peak position |
|---|---|
| Australia (ARIA) | 32 |
| Australia Hip Hop/R&B (ARIA) | 15 |
| Canada Hot 100 (Billboard) | 12 |
| Global 200 (Billboard) | 15 |
| Greece International (IFPI) | 25 |
| New Zealand (Recorded Music NZ) | 31 |
| Nigeria (TurnTable Top 100) | 85 |
| South Africa Streaming (TOSAC) | 6 |
| Sweden (Sverigetopplistan) | 87 |
| United Arab Emirates (IFPI) | 18 |
| US Billboard Hot 100 | 12 |
| US Hot R&B/Hip-Hop Songs (Billboard) | 11 |

== See also ==
- Relationship of 21 Savage and Drake
