= 3AM on Glenwood =

2022 song by 21 Savage

Song by 21 Savage

from the album Her Loss
- Released: November 4, 2022
- Recorded: 2022
- Studio: Leading by Example (Atlanta)
- Genre: Hip hop
- Length: 2:58
- Label: OVO; Republic
- Songwriters: Shéyaa Abraham-Joseph; Ozan Yildirim; Peter Iskander; Noah Shebib
- Producers: Oz; Iskander (co.); 40 (co.)

"3AM on Glenwood" is a song by Atlanta-based rapper 21 Savage from his collaborative studio album Her Loss (2022) with Drake. The song is a continuance of Drake's "[timestamp] in [city]" series of tracks. It is the only track on the album by 21 Savage alone.

== Background ==
In an interview with DJ Akademiks, 21 Savage claims that when he was in the studio working on another song, he pulled up the beat from "3AM on Glenwood" and recorded a freestyle over it.

== Lyrics ==
In the song, 21 Savage talks about the feelings and experiences of a prosperous gangster. He raps like “Ozium”, the well-known air purifier, about how important it is to constantly remove smoke and keep everything clean. Along with his achievements, 21 Savage brags about owning a coupe similar to Stephon Marbury's and sending his children to private schools to better prepare them for the future. Throughout the song, 21 Savage respects and commemorates the deaths of his friends and family members. He regrets that Skinny, a boyhood friend, died while he was still growing up. He laments the passing of Johnny, one of the gang's brothers. 21 Savage has PTSD as a result of these losses.

== Reception ==
The song received generally positive reviews from music critics. In a review of Her Loss, Eric Skelton of Complex compliments the song by saying, "If you somehow still don't respect his skills as a rapper (21 Savage), his performance on 3AM On Glenwood should change your mind", using the song as a good example by the rapper. He then ends it off by saying, "Her Loss is a very well-produced, enjoyable album full of great rapping (the five-song run from 'Broke Boys' to '3AM on Glenwood' is incredible)". Billboard's Michael Saponara ranked "3AM on Glenwood" as the fourth best song from Her Loss and praised 21 Savage for his "matured lyrical sparring ability" on the track.

== Charts ==
Chart performance for "3AM on Glenwood"
Chart (2022)	Peak position
Canada Hot 100 (Billboard)	32
Portugal (AFP)	91
Switzerland (Schweizer Hitparade)	89
US Billboard Hot 100	27
US Hot R&B/Hip-Hop Songs (Billboard)	19
