= Mr. Recoup =

2025 song by 21 Savage and Drake

Single by 21 Savage and Drake

from the album What Happened to the Streets?
- Released: December 12, 2025
- Genre: Hip-hop
- Length: 2:45
- Label: Slaughter Gang; Epic
- Songwriters: Shéyaa Abraham-Joseph; Aubrey Graham; Daniel Dodd; Shemar Pierre; Lyle Winkerprins; Noel Cadastre
- Producers: Brinx Parker; Pierre; Whiskerprince; Cadastre

Drake and 21 Savage singles chronology
"Spin Bout U" (2023)	"Mr. Recoup" (2025)

"Mr. Recoup" is a song by British rapper 21 Savage and Canadian rapper Drake, released on December 12, 2025, from the former's fourth studio album What Happened to the Streets?. It was produced by Brinx Parker, Shemar Pierre and Whiskerprince, with additional production from Noel Cadastre. It impacted rhythmic contemporary radio on January 13, 2026, as the album's only single.

== Composition ==
The song contains a piano loop and synths. In a threatening delivery, 21 Savage raps about regaining money and personal losses and uses gallows humor regarding his enemies. Drake raps the first verse of the song.

== Critical reception ==
Michael Saponara of Billboard ranked it as the second best song from What Happened to the Streets?. Tallie Spencer of HotNewHipHop had a positive reaction, writing "Drake always comes with a surprise, which is why fans always lean in to hear what he's going to say. The chemistry between him and 21 is still there, effortless as ever. The two have a tag-team feel that serve as a reminder for why their collabs hit so hard. It's the kind of record that feels familiar but fresh, like they're tapping back into a formula they know works." Craig Jenkins of Vulture opined that the rappers displayed a "quirky creative chemistry", particularly noting that Drake's line "They can't find the shooter, bitch, 'cause it's us" "feels like playing to the room" when compared with 21 Savage's lyrics about trauma and risks related to gun violence. He added that Drake's guest appearance "feels almost ornamental. And to be fair, Drake insists he's here only because he liked the beat." Robin Murray of Clash described Drake as "lacklustre" on the song, while Mosi Reeves of Rolling Stone commented he "trots out a nonplussed flow that hearkens to his newly minted 'Iceman' persona." Reeves also cited "Mr. Recoup" as among the tracks from What Happened to the Streets? that "falter over weak choruses and a lack of real emotional stakes."

== Charts ==
Chart performance
Chart (2025–2026)	Peak position
Canada Hot 100 (Billboard)	44
Global 200 (Billboard)	77
New Zealand Hot Singles (RMNZ)	2
South Africa Streaming (TOSAC)	55
US Billboard Hot 100	51
US Hot R&B/Hip-Hop Songs (Billboard)	4
US Rhythmic Airplay (Billboard)	23
