= Shake Sumn =

2023 single by DaBaby

- Cover art for the official remix

Single by DaBaby

from the EP Call da Fireman
- Released: June 6, 2023
- Genre: Drill
- Length: 2:04
- Label: South Coast; Interscope
- Songwriters: Jonathan Kirk; Ernest Brown
- Producer: Charlie Heat

DaBaby singles chronology
"06 Gucci" (2023)	"Shake Sumn" (2023)	"Trickin'" (2023)

Music video
- "Shake Sumn" on YouTube
- "Shake Sumn (Remix)" on YouTube

"Shake Sumn" is a song by American rapper DaBaby from his EP Call da Fireman (2023). It was sent to rhythmic contemporary radio on June 6, 2023 as the lead single from the EP. The song was produced by Charlie Heat. An official remix with American rapper Sexyy Red was released on July 7, 2023.

== Background ==
In April 2023, DaBaby previewed the song on Instagram, in a snippet of him with family during Easter weekend and kids dancing to the song. Before and during the time of release, HotNewHipHop predicted the song would go viral on the video-sharing platform TikTok because of its style for dancing. The song was released from DaBaby's EP on May 5, 2023. It became widely used on TikTok, after which it debuted on the Billboard Hot 100 at number 92, later peaking at 65. HipHopDX has noted it is DaBaby's highest charting song since he gained controversy for making homophobic remarks at his Rolling Loud performance in 2021.

== Music video ==
An official music video was released on May 8, 2023. Directed by Reel Goats, it opens with a skit featuring comedian Funny Marco, who tries to deliver a news report as he is being disrupted by a chaotic party. The clip then shows "synchronized dance sessions" in a warehouse which DaBaby takes part in while wearing a firefighter outfit.

== Remix ==
The official remix of the song was released on July 7, 2023, and is a collaboration with Sexyy Red. A music video for the remix was released on July 10, 2023. It also shows DaBaby dressed as a fireman, and he and Red are accompanied by a group of twerking dancers. Actor Gianni Paolo makes a cameo in the clip, as a hostage of Sexyy Red.

== Charts ==
=== Weekly charts ===
Weekly chart performance for "Shake Sumn"
Chart (2023)	Peak position
US Billboard Hot 100	65
US Hot R&B/Hip-Hop Songs (Billboard)	18
US Rhythmic Airplay (Billboard)	10

=== Year-end charts ===
Year-end chart performance for "Shake Sumn"
Chart (2023)	Position
US Hot R&B/Hip-Hop Songs (Billboard)	48

== Certifications ==
Certifications for "Shake Sumn"
Region	Certification	Certified units/sales
United States (RIAA)	Platinum	1,000,000^{‡}
^{‡} Sales+streaming figures based on certification alone.
