= BackOutsideBoyz =

2022 song by Drake

Song by Drake

from the album Her Loss
- Released: November 4, 2022
- Recorded: 2022
- Studio: The Chapel (Toronto)
- Genre: Hip hop
- Length: 2:32
- Label: OVO; Republic
- Songwriters: Aubrey Graham; Rio Leyva; Dylan Cleary-Krell; Danny Snodgrass Jr.; Miles McCollum
- Producers: Leyva; Dez Wright; Taz Taylor; Lil Yachty

"BackOutsideBoyz" is a song by Canadian rapper Drake from his collaborative studio album Her Loss (2022) with Atlanta-based rapper 21 Savage.

== Background ==
The song was produced by Leyva, Dez Wright, Taz Taylor, and Lil Yachty. In an interview with XXL, Dez Wright goes over the making of "BackOutsideBoyz".

== Controversy ==
The song generated controversy due to Drake's lyrics about DRAM and Ice Spice, saying ("Try to bring the dram' to me / He ain't know how we 'Cha Cha Slide'") towards DRAM, referencing the "Cha-Cha" and “Hotline Bling” drama in 2015, and ("She a 10 tryin' to rap, it's good on mute") towards Ice Spice, referencing her Twitter post "At least ima 10". DRAM responded on Twitter, calling out Drake in a video, saying, "I pressed his ass! His fucking bodyguards, goddamn—I ain't gonna hold you, his bodyguards went to town on the kid. But his bodyguards did, not his bitch-ass! He ain't touch me, he's a bitch. You know that." Ice Spice followed up by saying nothing happened between her and Drake and that the line wasn't about her in an interview with Ebro in the Morning.

== Critical reception ==
The song received generally positive reviews from music critics. In a review of Her Loss, Craig Jenkins of Vulture compliments the song by saying, "BackOutsideBoyz, a clinic in the album’s flaws", and describes Drake's flow as "powerful". John Svetz of Paste describes the song as being a "club banger".

== Charts ==
Chart performance for "BackOutsideBoyz"
Chart (2022)	Peak position
Australia (ARIA)	82
Canada Hot 100 (Billboard)	8
France (SNEP)	127
Global 200 (Billboard)	10
Greece International (IFPI)	9
Iceland (Tónlistinn)	12
Lithuania (AGATA)	34
Luxembourg (Billboard)	19
Portugal (AFP)	30
South Africa (RISA)	5
Sweden (Sverigetopplistan)	46
UK Audio Streaming (OCC)	17
UK Hip Hop/R&B (OCC)	8
US Billboard Hot 100	9
US Hot R&B/Hip-Hop Songs (Billboard)	8

=== Year-end charts ===
Year-end chart performance for "BackOutsideBoyz"
Chart (2023)	Position
US Hot R&B/Hip-Hop Songs (Billboard)	79
