= Her Loss =

2022 studio album by Drake and 21 Savage

Studio album by Drake and 21 Savage
- Released: November 4, 2022
- Studios: The Chapel (Toronto); Leading by Example (Atlanta); Track Records (North Hollywood)
- Genre: Hip-hop
- Length: 60:33
- Labels: OVO; Republic
- Producers: B100; Banbwoi; Boi-1da; Cheeze Beatz; Dez Wright; Earl on the Beat; F1lthy; Gent!; Go Grizzly; Kid Masterpiece; Kyson; Lil Yachty; Luke Crowder; Mcevoy; Metro Boomin; Noel Cadastre; Nyan; Oz; Rio Leyva; SkipOnDaBeat; Squat Beats; Tay Keith; Taz Taylor; Vinylz; Wheezy

Drake chronology
Honestly, Nevermind (2022)	Her Loss (2022)	For All the Dogs (2023)

21 Savage chronology
Spiral: From the Book of Saw Soundtrack (2021)	Her Loss (2022)	American Dream (2024)

Singles from Her Loss
- 1. "Rich Flex" Released: November 11, 2022; 2. "Circo Loco" Released: November 11, 2022; 3. "Spin Bout U" Released: February 24, 2023

Her Loss is a collaborative album by rappers Drake and 21 Savage. It was released on November 4, 2022, through OVO Sound and Republic Records. The album features a sole guest appearance from Travis Scott. Production was handled by a range of record producers, including Boi-1da, Metro Boomin, Oz, Tay Keith, Vinylz, Wheezy, Taz Taylor, and Lil Yachty, among others. It is the final installment of what Drake described as a "trilogy", following Certified Lover Boy (2021) and Honestly, Nevermind (2022).

Drake and 21 Savage have frequently collaborated since 2016, with Her Loss announced in the music video for their then-most recent collaboration "Jimmy Cooks". During marketing, Drake and 21 Savage spoofed music promotion techniques, including a Vogue cover, Cartier advertisement, Tiny Desk Concert, interview on The Howard Stern Show, and televised and online live performances on Saturday Night Live and ColorsxStudios: the artists settled after being sued by Condé Nast for using Vogue trademarks without permission. Originally set for release on October 28, 2022, Her Loss was delayed to November 4.

The album received mixed reviews from critics, with praise for its fan service but criticism for some of its lyrics, which garnered controversy. Her Loss opened with first-week sales of 404,000 album-equivalent units in the United States and topped the Billboard 200, supported by the singles "Rich Flex", "Circo Loco", and "Spin Bout U". It was nominated for Best Rap Album at the 66th Grammy Awards.

== Background ==
Her Loss came after the duo's previous collaborations on "Sneakin'" (2016), "Issa" (2017), "Mr. Right Now" (2020), and "Knife Talk" (2021). On June 17, 2022, Drake released the song "Jimmy Cooks" featuring 21 Savage as the final track of his seventh studio album Honestly, Nevermind. Upon release, the song was the most successful track off the album and debuted at number one on the Billboard Hot 100, but the song was not officially serviced to mainstream radio as a single until October 11. On October 19, Drake performed as a surprise guest at one of 21 Savage's concerts in Atlanta.

On October 21, Drake announced the "Jimmy Cooks" music video would be released on 21 Savage's 30th birthday a day later. The video was eventually released that day. The visuals were briefly interrupted at the 1:25-mark, with text in typographic letters appearing reading "Her Loss – album by Drake and 21 Savage – October 28, 2022". The album was then confirmed by OVO and Republic on their social media. On October 26, Drake announced the album had been delayed to November 4, 2022, due to OVO record producer 40 contracting COVID-19 during the album's mixing and mastering process. The tracklist was revealed on November 3. On November 26, 2022, Drake revealed that the album is part of a trilogy of albums following Certified Lover Boy and Honestly, Nevermind.

== Artwork ==
The cover art features adult dancer and model Quiana "Qui" Yasuka, also known as Suki Baby. It was posted by the rappers on their Instagram profiles on November 2. The then three-year old photograph was taken by Paris Aden, and was discovered by Lil Yachty, who proposed it as the cover art.

== Promotion ==
On November 1, 2022, Drake and 21 Savage began a joint fake press run for the album, spoofing common contemporary music promotion techniques. These included a Vogue cover, which was handed out by street teams and contained edited photos of Hailey Bieber and Jennifer Lawrence with 21 Savage's face tattoos. Other spoofs included a fake Cartier advertisement, a fake Tiny Desk Concert introduction, and a deepfake interview on The Howard Stern Show. They also mimicked televised and online live performances, such as performing "On BS" on Saturday Night Live (which guest starred Michael B. Jordan) and "Privileged Rappers" on a gold plated set of ColorsxStudios.

"Rich Flex" was released on November 11, 2022, as the album's lead single. "Circo Loco" was sent to Italian contemporary hit radio on November 11, 2022, as the second official single from the album. "Spin Bout U" was sent to US rhythmic radio on February 24, 2023, as the third single.

== Critical reception ==
Her Loss ratings
Aggregate scores
Source	Rating
AnyDecentMusic?	5.5/10
Metacritic	62/100
Review scores
Source	Rating
AllMusic	3/5 stars
Clash	6/10
Exclaim!	8/10
HipHopDX	3.2/5
NME	3/5 stars
Paste	6.5/10
Pitchfork	6.4/10
RapReviews	6.5/10
Slant Magazine	2.5/5 stars

Her Loss was met with mixed reviews. At Metacritic, which assigns a normalized rating out of 100 to reviews from professional publications, the album received an average score of 62, based on 12 reviews, indicating "generally favorable reviews". Aggregator AnyDecentMusic? gave it 5.5 out of 10, based on their assessment of the critical consensus.

Vernon Ayiku of Exclaim! praised the album, stating, "While Her Loss houses no immediate street bangers or Billboard hits, it's the sum that makes it Drake's best record this decade. From the comical fake promos during its rollout to the memorable one-liners and aggressive diss verses or the TikTok memes it will generate for months to come, Her Loss has a lot of meat on its bones". Marcus Shorter from Consequence enjoyed the album, saying, "Her Loss isn't always a deep album, but that doesn't make it any less profound. Sometimes excellent rapping over very dope beats mixed with a tinge of introspection goes a long way. Her Loss is our gain". Alex Swhear of Variety said, "Though not without its missteps, Her Loss leaves the unshakable impression that Drake, in 2022, is doing what inspires him rather than pandering. One year from Certified Lover Boy, that [is] a surprising and encouraging evolution".

In a lukewarm review, RapReviews's Steve "Flash" Juon said, "It's a better Drake album than Honestly, Nevermind [but] it's not a better 21 [Savage] album than I Am > I Was (2018) or Issa (2017). If you split the difference you wind up with an average album. There are a few [songs] I'd care to play more than once". Writing for Pitchfork, Paul A. Thompson stated, "There are moments of considered writing and bursts of Drake at or near his mischievous best, but in its middle, the record becomes inert, making the bits of self-conscious misanthropy scan as strained rather than gleeful, as if the id could be focus-grouped". Reviewing the album for Paste, Josh Svetz stated: "The best moments come when the duo find a balance and Drake falls back on his crate-digging prowess. ... Sadly, there's not enough of this to go around, making Her Loss another disposable Drake project that will fade away in a few weeks—one that could have been so much more".

In a mixed review, Clash's Robin Murray said, "This new album is the perfect piece of fan service. It's [Drake] on the mic, 21 Savage in full flow. The roll out – which pirated a Tiny Desk session and copied a Vogue cover – was pitch perfect, two artists subverting the expectations placed on them... It's a shame that Her Loss often feels entirely predictable. The foes that punctuate their bars are well-worn – less talented adversaries, love interests who leech on their wealth and prestige – and while it's nice to hear Drake unleashed, at times 21 Savage can feel like a passenger". Paul Attard of Slant Magazine said, "Uneven. ... There's simply too little give and take between this pairing to justify calling this a mutually beneficial partnership". In a negative review, Rolling Stone's Mosi Reeves said, "As Her Loss abandons 21 [Savage]'s form of smack talk as a playful, revelatory exercise, its tone shifts to Drake's toxic petulance... There's a gloominess this time around, and it's not just sloppy sequencing and hit-or-miss quality that ranges from clear standouts like "Pussy & Millions" [or] "Treacherous Twins", to aimless dross like "Major Distribution". [The album] is a singular misfire".

=== Year-end lists ===
Select year-end rankings of Her Loss
Critic/Publication	List	Rank	Ref.
Complex	The Best Albums of 2022	8	
Rolling Stone	The 100 Best Albums of 2022	66	

=== Industry awards ===
Awards and nominations for Her Loss
Year	Ceremony	Category	Result	Ref.
2023	BET Awards	Album of the Year	Nominated	
2023	BET Hip Hop Awards	Hip Hop Album of the Year	Won	
2023	Billboard Music Awards	Top Billboard 200 Album	Nominated	
2023	Billboard Music Awards	Top Rap Album	Won	
2024	Grammy Awards	Best Rap Album	Nominated	

== Controversy ==
According to reports, Drake dissed several prominent celebrities throughout Her Loss, which received widespread media coverage and controversy. On "Circo Loco", he raps, "This bitch lie 'bout gettin' shots but she still a stallion / She don't even get the joke, but she still smilin'", which was interpreted as a double entendre that referenced women being dishonest about getting lip and buttock augmentations, and implied that Megan Thee Stallion was lying about her 2020 shooting allegations against Tory Lanez. Lil Yachty, who produced several songs on the album, stated "Circo Loco" did not reference Megan Thee Stallion, although she responded on Twitter, writing, "Stop using my shooting for clout bitch ass Niggas! Since when tf is it cool to joke abt women getting shot! You niggas especially RAP NIGGAS ARE LAME! Ready to boycott bout shoes and clothes but dog pile on a black woman when she say one of y'all homeboys abused her." Rolling Stone's Mosi Reeves wrote the controversy made Drake "unintentionally reveal himself as a self-centered jerk who refuses to grow up."

On "Middle of the Ocean", Drake references his ex-girlfriend Serena Williams and her husband Alexis Ohanian, rapping, "Sidebar, Serena, your husband a groupie / He claim we don't got a problem but / No, boo, it is like you comin' for sushi / We might pop up on 'em at will like Suzuki." Ohanian addressed the reference on Twitter, writing "The reason I stay winning is because I'm relentless about being the best at whatever I do – including being the best groupie for my wife and [my] daughter." On "BackOutsideBoyz", Drake was interpreted as dissing both DRAM, saying "Try to bring the dram' to me / He ain't know how we 'Cha Cha Slide'") and Ice Spice ("She a 10 tryin' to rap, it's good on mute").

Four days after the album's release, Drake and 21 Savage were sued by Condé Nast, the publisher for Vogue, in a Manhattan federal court who alleged their promotional campaign "entirely" relied on the unauthorised use of their trademarks and false representations relating to their business and business relationships. Condé Nast sought at least $4 million, or triple the defendants' profits from Her Loss, punitive damages, and to end any trademark infringement, and claimed they reached out to Drake and 21 Savage prior to taking legal action.

== Commercial performance ==
Her Loss debuted at number one on the US Billboard 200 with 404,000 album-equivalent units, including 12,000 pure album sales, replacing Taylor Swift's Midnights (2022) from the top spot. Her Loss earned a total of 513.56 million on-demand streams. The album is Drake's twelfth and 21 Savage's third number-one album in the US. All 16 tracks debuted on the Billboard Hot 100, with eight of them appearing in the top-10. The following week, Her Loss descended to number two, earning 170,000 album-equivalent units. On October 25, 2023, the album was certified double platinum by the Recording Industry Association of America (RIAA) for combined sales and album-equivalent units of over a two million units in the United States. As of December 27, 2023, Her Loss was the thirteenth best-selling album of the year according to Hits, moved a total 1,337,000 album-equivalent units, including 20,000 pure album sales, 40,000 song sales, 1.731 billion audio-on-demand streams, and 74 million video-on-demand streams.

== Track listing ==
Her Loss track listing
No.	Title	Writer(s)	Producer(s)	Length
1.	"Rich Flex"	Aubrey Graham; Shéyaa Abraham-Joseph; Anderson Hernandez; Brytavious Chambers; Michael Mulé; Isaac De Boni; Jahmal Gwin; Megan Pete; Anthony White; Bobby Session Jr.; Clifford Harris Jr.; Aldrin Davis; Gladys Hayes; Charles Bernstein	Vinylz; Tay Keith; FnZ^{[c]}; BoogzDaBeast^{[c]}	3:59
2.	"Major Distribution"	Graham; Abraham-Joseph; Miles McCollum; Edgar Ferrera; Elijah Fox-Peck; Tyshane Thompson	SkipOnDaBeat	2:50
3.	"On BS"	Graham; Abraham-Joseph; Ozan Yildirim; Elias Sticken; Simon Gebrelul	Oz; Elyas^{[c]}	4:21
4.	"BackOutsideBoyz" (performed by Drake)	Graham; Rio Leyva; Dylan Cleary-Krell; Danny Snodgrass Jr.; McCollum	Leyva; Dez Wright; Taz Taylor; Lil Yachty	2:32
5.	"Privileged Rappers"	Graham; Abraham-Joseph; Isaac Bynum; Gentuar Memishi; McCollum; Noah Shebib; Ronald Isley; O'Kelly Isley Jr.; Rudolph Isley; Ernie Isley; Marvin Isley; Chris Jasper	Earl on the Beat; Gent!; Lil Yachty; 40^{[a]}	2:40
6.	"Spin Bout U"	Graham; Abraham-Joseph; Marquell Jones; Shebib; Tenaia Sanders; Dwayne Armstrong	Banbwoi; 40^{[a]}	3:34
7.	"Hours in Silence"	Graham; Abraham-Joseph; Nyan Lieberthal; Cole McEvoy-Morie; Shebib; Noel Cadastre; Ashanti Guerrero; Paul Beauregard	Nyan; Mcevoy; 40^{[c]}; Cadastre^{[c]}; Daniel East^{[c]}	6:39
8.	"Treacherous Twins"	Graham; Abraham-Joseph; Cadastre; Yildirim; Matthew Samuels; Elgin Lumpkin; Timothy Mosley; Melvin Barcliff; Thom Bell; Linda Creed	Cadastre; Oz; Boi-1da^{[a]}	3:00
9.	"Circo Loco"	Graham; Abraham-Joseph; Samuels; Chambers; Shebib; McCollum; Thomas Bangalter; Guy-Manuel de Homem-Christo; Anthony Moore	Boi-1da; Tay Keith; 40^{[a]}	3:56
10.	"Pussy & Millions" (featuring Travis Scott)	Graham; Abraham-Joseph; Jacques Webster II; Darryl McCorkell; Kevin Price; Julius Rivera III; Timothy McKibbins; McCollum; Irvin Whitlow; Josiah Muhammad; Morris Jones	Cheeze Beatz; Go Grizzly; Squat Beats; B100; Lil Yachty	4:02
11.	"Broke Boys"	Graham; Abraham-Joseph; Wesley Glass; Chambers; Luke Crowder; Abraham Herrera; Rafeal Brown	Wheezy; Tay Keith; Crowder^{[c]}; Jack Uriah^{[c]}; AudioAnthem^{[c]}	3:45
12.	"Middle of the Ocean" (performed by Drake)	Graham; Yildirim; Nik Frascona; Cadastre; Tim Friedrich; Louis Leibfried; Cameron Giles; Joseph Jones II; LaRon James; Darryl Pittman; Kenneth Gamble; Leon Huff	Oz; Nik D^{[c]}; Cadastre^{[c]}; Sucuki^{[c]}; Loof^{[a]}	5:56
13.	"Jumbotron Shit Poppin" (performed by Drake)	Graham; Richard Ortiz; Kevin Gomringer; Tim Gomringer; McCollum; Jordan Ortiz; Jeremiah Raisen; Shebib; Simon Gaudes; Daniele Gagliardi; Dilara Sincer	F1lthy; Cubeatz^{[c]}; Lil Yachty^{[c]}; Oogie Mane^{[c]}; SadPony^{[c]}; 40^{[a]}; Klimperboy^{[a]}; DannoProductionz^{[a]}; Sincer^{[a]}	2:17
14.	"More M's"	Graham; Abraham-Joseph; Leland Wayne; Jian Liew; David Ruoff; Elias Klughammer	Metro Boomin; Kyson; David x Eli^{[c]}	3:41
15.	"3AM on Glenwood" (performed by 21 Savage)	Abraham-Joseph; Yildirim; Peter Iskander; Shebib	Oz; Iskander^{[c]}; 40^{[c]}	2:58
16.	"I Guess It's Fuck Me" (performed by Drake)	Graham; Shiv Barot; Patrick Rosario; Douglas Ford; Berwyn DuBois	The Loud Pack	4:23
Total length:				60:33

Notes

- ^{^[c]} signifies a co-producer
- ^{^[a]} signifies an additional producer

Sample credits

- "Rich Flex" contains:
  - samples of "Welcome to the Hive" (from Invasion of the Bee Girls), composed by Charles Bernstein;
  - samples of "I Want You, Girl", written by Gladys Hayes and performed by Sugar;
  - interpolations of "Savage", written by Megan Pete, Anthony White, and Bobby Session Jr., as performed by Megan Thee Stallion;
  - interpolations of "24's", written by Clifford Harris Jr. and Aldrin Davis, as performed by T.I..
- "Major Distribution" contains samples of "East Village", written by Elijah Fox-Peck and performed by Elijah Fox.
- "Privileged Rappers" contains samples of "Ballad for the Fallen Soldier", written by Ronald Isley, O'Kelly Isley Jr., Rudolph Isley, Ernie Isley, Marvin Isley, and Chris Jasper, as performed by the Isley Brothers.
- "Spin Bout U" contains samples of "Give Me Your Lov-N", written by Tenaia Sanders and Dwayne Armstrong, as performed by Oobie.
- "Hours in Silence" contains samples of "Stash Pot", written by Paul Beauregard and performed by Koopsta Knicca.
- "Treacherous Twins" contains samples of "Lonely Daze", written by Elgin Lumpkin, Timothy Mosley, Melvin Barcliff, Thom Bell, and Linda Creed, as performed by Ginuwine.
- "Circo Loco" contains elements of "One More Time", written by Thomas Bangalter, Guy-Manuel de Homem-Christo, and Anthony Moore, as performed by Daft Punk.
- "Middle of the Ocean" contains samples of:
  - "Real Niggas", written by Cameron Giles, Joseph Jones II, LaRon James, and Darryl Pittman, as performed by the Diplomats;
  - and "Cry Together", written by Kenneth Gamble and Leon Huff, as performed by the O'Jays.

== Personnel ==
Credits adapted from official liner notes.

Musicians

- Drake – vocals (tracks 1–14, 16)
- 21 Savage – vocals (1–3, 5–11, 14, 15)
- Travis Scott – vocals (10)
- Birdman – additional vocals (1, 12)
- Young Nudy – additional vocals (1)
- Tay Keith – drums (1, 9)
- Vinylz – drums (1, 9)
- Elijah Fox – additional vocals (2)
- Big Bank – additional vocals (3)
- Lil Yachty – additional vocals (4), background vocals (13)
- Noah Shebib – additional keyboards (5)
- Noel Cadastre – drums, keyboards (8)
- Oz – drums (8)
- Dougie F – background vocals (16)

Technical

- Chris Athens – mastering
- Dave Huffman – mastering (1–8), mastering assistance (9–16)
- Noah Shebib – mixing (all tracks)
- Noel Cadastre – mixing (1–13, 15, 16), recording (1–7, 10–16), mixing assistance (14)
- Metro Boomin – mixing (14)
- Ethan Stevens – mixing (14), recording (10)
- Les Bateman – engineering
- Isaiah Brown – recording (1–3, 5–7, 11, 14, 15)
- Harley Arsenault – mixing assistance (1–13, 15, 16)
- Greg Moffet – mixing assistance (1, 9–16)

== Charts ==
=== Weekly charts ===
Weekly chart performance
Chart (2022)	Peak position
Australian Albums (ARIA)	2
Australian Hip Hop/R&B Albums (ARIA)	1
Austrian Albums (Ö3 Austria)	2
Belgian Albums (Ultratop Flanders)	4
Belgian Albums (Ultratop Wallonia)	6
Canadian Albums (Billboard)	1
Czech Albums (ČNS IFPI)	5
Danish Albums (Hitlisten)	1
Dutch Albums (Album Top 100)	2
Finnish Albums (Suomen virallinen lista)	4
French Albums (SNEP)	10
German Albums (Offizielle Top 100)	6
Icelandic Albums (Tónlistinn)	1
Irish Albums (Official Charts)	2
Italian Albums (FIMI)	3
Lithuanian Albums (AGATA)	1
New Zealand Albums (RMNZ)	2
Nigeria Albums (TurnTable)	6
Norwegian Albums (VG-lista)	1
Slovak Albums (ČNS IFPI)	2
Spanish Albums (Promusicae)	6
Swedish Albums (Sverigetopplistan)	2
Swiss Albums (Schweizer Hitparade)	1
UK Albums (Official Charts)	1
UK R&B Albums (Official Charts)	4
US Billboard 200	1
US Top R&B/Hip-Hop Albums (Billboard)	1

=== Year-end charts ===
Year-end chart performance
Chart (2022)	Position
Australian Albums (ARIA)	87
Austrian Albums (Ö3 Austria)	60
Belgian Albums (Ultratop Flanders)	109
Dutch Albums (Album Top 100)	58
Icelandic Albums (Tónlistinn)	53
Lithuanian Albums (AGATA)	70
New Zealand Albums (RMNZ)	45
Swiss Albums (Schweizer Hitparade)	45
UK Albums (OCC)	69

Year-end chart performance
Chart (2023)	Position
Australian Albums (ARIA)	81
Belgian Albums (Ultratop Flanders)	106
Canadian Albums (Billboard)	4
Icelandic Albums (Tónlistinn)	46
Swiss Albums (Schweizer Hitparade)	78
UK Albums (OCC)	93
US Billboard 200	4
US Top R&B/Hip-Hop Albums (Billboard)	2

Year-end chart performance
Chart (2024)	Position
Australian Hip Hop/R&B Albums (ARIA)	46
US Billboard 200	73
US Top R&B/Hip-Hop Albums (Billboard)	38

== Certifications ==
Certifications
Region	Certification	Certified units/sales
Australia (ARIA)	Gold	35,000^{‡}
Canada (Music Canada)	2× Platinum	160,000^{‡}
Denmark (IFPI Danmark)	Gold	10,000^{‡}
Italy (FIMI)	Gold	25,000^{‡}
New Zealand (RMNZ)	Platinum	15,000^{‡}
Poland (ZPAV)	Gold	10,000^{‡}
United Kingdom (BPI)	Gold	100,000^{‡}
United States (RIAA)	2× Platinum	2,000,000^{‡}
^{‡} Sales+streaming figures based on certification alone.

== Release history ==
Release dates and formats
Region	Date	Label(s)	Format(s)	Ref.
Various	November 4, 2022	OVO; Republic	Digital download; streaming	
Various	March 17, 2023	OVO; Republic	CD	
