= Pussy & Millions =

2022 song by Drake and 21 Savage featuring Travis Scott

Song by Drake and 21 Savage featuring Travis Scott

from the album Her Loss
- Released: November 4, 2022
- Recorded: 2021
- Studio: H.O.M.E. (Los Angeles); Leading by Example (Atlanta)
- Genre: Hip hop; trap
- Length: 4:02
- Label: OVO; Republic
- Songwriters: Aubrey Graham; Shéyaa Abraham-Joseph; Jacques Webster II; Darryl McCorkell; Kevin Price; Julius Rivera III; Timothy McKibbins; Miles McCollum; Irvin Whitlow; Josiah Muhammad; Morris Jones
- Producers: Cheeze Beatz; Go Grizzly; Squat Beats; B100; Lil Yachty

"Pussy & Millions" is a song by Canadian rapper Drake and Atlanta-based rapper 21 Savage featuring American rapper Travis Scott. Produced by Cheeze Beatz, Go Grizzly, Squat Beats, B100, and Lil Yachty, it was released as the tenth track from the two lead artists' collaborative studio album, Her Loss, on November 4, 2022.

== Content ==
The song centers on the wealth of the rappers and some problems resulting from it, as well as a "tale of love complexity", referencing the song "Mo Money Mo Problems" by the Notorious B.I.G. with the lyrics "They say: mo money, mo problems / Bring on the problems".

== Critical reception ==
Mosi Reeves of Rolling Stone regarded the song as one of the "clear standouts" on Her Loss. In an unfavorable response, Josh Svetz of Paste wrote that it "fails to make good on its star billing, putting 21 in an awkward situation where he tries to rap like Scott, but he can't pull off the lack of humanity Scott excels at."

== Charts ==
=== Weekly charts ===
Weekly chart performance for "Pussy & Millions"
Chart (2022)	Peak position
Australia (ARIA)	5
Austria (Ö3 Austria Top 40)	23
Canada Hot 100 (Billboard)	6
Denmark (Tracklisten)	20
France (SNEP)	96
Global 200 (Billboard)	6
Greece International (IFPI)	5
Ireland (IRMA)	95
Italy (FIMI)	62
Netherlands (Single Top 100)	72
New Zealand (Recorded Music NZ)	5
Norway (VG-lista)	15
Sweden (Sverigetopplistan)	47
Switzerland (Schweizer Hitparade)	12
UK Audio Streaming (Official Charts)	9
US Billboard Hot 100	6
US Hot R&B/Hip-Hop Songs (Billboard)	5

=== Year-end charts ===
Year-end chart performance for "Pussy & Millions"
Chart (2023)	Position
US Hot R&B/Hip-Hop Songs (Billboard)	41

== Certifications ==
Certifications for "Pussy & Millions"
Region	Certification	Certified units/sales
Australia (ARIA)	Gold	35,000^{‡}
New Zealand (RMNZ)	Gold	15,000^{‡}
^{‡} Sales+streaming figures based on certification alone.
