= Jumbotron Shit Poppin =

2022 song by Drake

Song by Drake

from the album Her Loss
- Released: November 4, 2022
- Recorded: 2022
- Studio: The Chapel (Toronto)
- Genre: Hip hop
- Length: 2:17
- Label: OVO; Republic
- Songwriters: Aubrey Graham; Richard Ortiz; Kevin Gomringer; Tim Gomringer; Miles McCollum; Jordan Ortiz; Jeremiah Raisen; Shebib; Simon Gaudes; Daniele Gagliardi; Dilara Sincer
- Producers: F1lthy; Cubeatz; Lil Yachty; Oogie Mane; Sad Pony; 40; Klimperboy; DannoProductionz; Sincer

Music video
- "Jumbotron Shit Poppin" on YouTube

"Jumbotron Shit Poppin" is a song by Canadian rapper Drake from his collaborative studio album Her Loss (2022) with Atlanta-based rapper 21 Savage.

== Critical reception ==
The song received generally mixed reviews. Robin Murray of Clash had a favorable response, stating the song's melodic flow "is just straight fun". In a review of Her Loss, Vernon Ayiku of Exclaim! regarded it as one of the "unnecessary and actively damaging" tracks "that could have been left on the cutting room floor." Paul A. Thompson of Pitchfork wrote, "Still, tucked between the sameness are pockets of strangeness—like the drawn-out instrumental ending to 'Jumbotron Shit Poppin,' at once triumphant and melancholy." Josh Svetz of Paste commented it "sounds confused and muddled, with Drake speeding up his vocals and losing the smoothness he's much more well-equipped for. It sounds like Drake trying to make Whole Lotta Red, which no one needs or asked for."

== Music video ==
An official music video was released on January 17, 2023. It was directed by Tristan C-M, who also produced it with Theo Skudra, Sebastian Contreras, and Anthony Gonzales. The clip opens with the captions, "THIS IS 72 HOURS FOR US", over camcorder footage of assorted jewelry and gold chain laid out on a marble bench. It sees Drake spending time at a mansion in California, in front of a red Ferrari parked in its driveway, shopping at a Rolex store with friends, at a nightclub, dining at a dimly-lit restaurant, and entertaining girls. He is noticeably seen wearing multiple pieces of jewelry bought from Pharrell, worth around $3 million in total. The video features cameos from Lil Baby, Mike Tyson, French Montana and Central Cee, as well as a shot of Lenny Kravitz performing.

== Charts ==
=== Weekly charts ===
Weekly chart performance for "Jumbotron Shit Poppin"
Chart (2022)	Peak position
Canada Hot 100 (Billboard)	16
Global 200 (Billboard)	21
Sweden Heatseeker (Sverigetopplistan)	20
UK Audio Streaming (Official Charts)	44
US Billboard Hot 100	16
US Hot R&B/Hip-Hop Songs (Billboard)	14

=== Year-end charts ===
Year-end chart performance for "Jumbotron Shit Poppin"
Chart (2023)	Position
US Hot R&B/Hip-Hop Songs (Billboard)	74
