= Circo Loco =

2022 single by Drake and 21 Savage

Single by Drake and 21 Savage

from the album Her Loss
- Released: November 11, 2022
- Recorded: 2021–2022
- Studio: Leading by Example (Atlanta)
- Genre: Hip hop
- Length: 3:56
- Label: OVO; Republic
- Songwriters: Aubrey Graham; Shéyaa Abraham-Joseph; Matthew Samuels; Brytavious Chambers; Noah Shebib; Miles McCollum; Thomas Bangalter; Guy-Manuel de Homem-Christo; Anthony Moore
- Producers: Boi-1da; Tay Keith; 40 (add.)

Drake and 21 Savage singles chronology
"Rich Flex" (2022)	"Circo Loco" (2022)	"Spin Bout U" (2023)

Drake singles chronology
"Rich Flex" (2022)	"Circo Loco" (2022)	"We Caa Done" (2023)

21 Savage singles chronology
"Rich Flex" (2022)	"Circo Loco" (2022)	"One Mic, One Gun" (2022)

"Circo Loco" is a song by Canadian rapper Drake and British-American rapper 21 Savage from their collaborative studio album Her Loss (2022). It was sent to Italian contemporary hit radio on November 11, 2022, as the second single from the album. Produced by Boi-1da, Tay Keith and 40, it contains a sample and interpolation of "One More Time" by Daft Punk. The song garnered controversy over a perceived diss toward American rapper Megan Thee Stallion.

== Composition ==
"Circo Loco" features "progressing" chords and "booming" bass in production, backed by the slowed-and-chopped sample. In his verse, Drake first raps about his sex life, and then addresses the shooting of Megan Thee Stallion by Canadian rapper Tory Lanez in 2020, suggesting in his lyrics that she was lying about the incident: "This bitch lie 'bout getting shots, but she still a stallion / She don't even get the joke, but she still smiling". He also raps about ending his feud with Kanye West for their benefit concert performance in support of Larry Hoover and raising awareness on prison reform, claiming that he only did it to appease James Prince, who planned the concert. 21 Savage raps about and threatens his enemies in his verse.

== Controversy ==
The song generated controversy due to Drake's lyrics about Megan Thee Stallion, who responded on Twitter with a series of posts condemning it. Rapper Lil Yachty, a songwriter of "Circo Loco", denied the song was referring to Megan on Instagram Live, saying, "It's not about Megan, it's about women lying about their butt shots, saying it's real when it's fake."

== Critical reception ==
The song received generally negative reviews from music critics, with particular criticism directed toward the sample as well as Drake's lines alluding to Megan Thee Stallion. Alex Swhear of Variety regarded the song "ill-advised in its Daft Punk sample and the perplexing bars that follow, in which Drake appears to make light of the alleged assault of Megan Thee Stallion by Tory Lanez". Marcus Shorter of Consequence wrote, "Taking swipes at Megan Thee Stallion on 'Circo Loco' puts that misogynistic behavior on full display." Matthew Ritchie of HipHopDX commented that the song "feels cheap and soulless", while Paul A. Thompson of Pitchfork described it as having a "hammily stupid Daft Punk flip". Josh Svetz of Paste wrote, "'Circo Loco' has been criticized for the Megan Thee Stallion diss, but its worst crime is butchering Daft Punk's classic 'One More Time'."

== Charts ==
=== Weekly charts ===
Weekly chart performance for "Circo Loco"
Chart (2022–2023)	Peak position
Australia (ARIA)	9
Canada Hot 100 (Billboard)	5
France (SNEP)	126
Global 200 (Billboard)	8
Greece International (IFPI)	8
Iceland (Tónlistinn)	10
Ireland (IRMA)	7
Italy (FIMI)	69
Lithuania (AGATA)	29
Luxembourg (Billboard)	16
New Zealand (Recorded Music NZ)	35
Norway (VG-lista)	37
Portugal (AFP)	24
South Africa (RISA)	9
Sweden (Sverigetopplistan)	55
UK Singles (Official Charts)	7
UK Hip Hop/R&B (Official Charts)	3
US Billboard Hot 100	8
US Hot R&B/Hip-Hop Songs (Billboard)	7
US Rhythmic Airplay (Billboard)	6

=== Year-end charts ===
Year-end chart performance for "Circo Loco"
Chart (2023)	Position
US Hot R&B/Hip-Hop Songs (Billboard)	37
US Rhythmic (Billboard)	34

== Certifications ==
Certifications for "Circo Loco"
Region	Certification	Certified units/sales
Australia (ARIA)	Platinum	70,000^{‡}
New Zealand (RMNZ)	Gold	15,000^{‡}
United Kingdom (BPI)	Silver	200,000^{‡}
United States (RIAA)	Platinum	1,000,000^{‡}
^{‡} Sales+streaming figures based on certification alone.

== Release history ==
Release history for "Circo Loco"
Region	Date	Format	Label	Ref.
Italy	November 11, 2022	Contemporary hit radio	Universal	
