= On BS =

2022 song by Drake and 21 Savage

Song by Drake and 21 Savage

from the album Her Loss
- Released: November 4, 2022
- Recorded: 2022
- Studio: Leading by Example (Atlanta); The Chapel (Toronto)
- Genre: Trap
- Length: 4:21
- Label: OVO; Republic
- Songwriters: Aubrey Graham; Shéyaa Abraham-Joseph; Ozan Yildirim; Elias Sticken; Simon Gebrelul
- Producers: Oz; Elyas (co.)

"On BS" is a song by Canadian rapper Drake and Atlanta-based rapper 21 Savage from their collaborative studio album Her Loss (2022). It was produced by Oz and co-produced by Elyas. The song peaked at number four on the Billboard Hot 100.

== Critical reception ==
The song received generally mixed to positive reviews from music critics. Robin Murray of Clash called it a "brutal, unrelenting roller and an easy early highlight." In a review of Her Loss, Vernon Ayiku of Exclaim! wrote, "However, despite being one-sided in Drake's favour, 21's presence and impact is enormous, with his humour, wit, and genuinely believable gangster persona pulling attention from Drake whenever the duo decides to go bar for bar, like on 'On BS.'" NME's Fred Garratt-Stanley praised the song, writing, "they bounce off each other neatly, asserting their star quality with back-to-back bars". Steve "Flash" Juon of RapReviews had a mixed reaction, commenting, "The songs where they share a more equal footing like 'On BS' are fun, although that one features a weird and unnecessarily extra long outro with someone bragging about being 'Birdman in Paris.'" Josh Svetz of Paste wrote, "Drake and 21 bob and weave through each other's verses, showcasing precision and timing as they trade flexes". Likewise, NPR's Sam Hockley-Smith wrote favorably of the collaboration: "Their chemistry is apparent on "On BS," when the duo bounce lines off each other: 21 Savage is penitent, calm, and menacing, where Drake is angry, high on pills, and paranoid."

== SNL spoof ==
On November 6, 2022, Drake and 21 Savage released a video of them performing the song in a spoof of Saturday Night Live.

== Charts ==
=== Weekly charts ===
Chart performance for "On BS"
Chart (2022)	Peak position
Australia (ARIA)	39
Canada Hot 100 (Billboard)	4
Denmark (Tracklisten)	36
France (SNEP)	118
Global 200 (Billboard)	5
Greece International (IFPI)	4
Italy (FIMI)	74
Lebanon (Lebanese Top 20)	17
Netherlands (Single Top 100)	30
New Zealand (Recorded Music NZ)	8
Norway (VG-lista)	31
Romania (Billboard)	20
Sweden (Sverigetopplistan)	57
UK Audio Streaming (Official Charts)	10
US Billboard Hot 100	4
US Hot R&B/Hip-Hop Songs (Billboard)	3

=== Year-end charts ===
Year-end chart performance for "On BS"
Chart (2023)	Position
US Hot R&B/Hip-Hop Songs (Billboard)	34

== Certifications ==
Certifications for "On BS"
Region	Certification	Certified units/sales
Australia (ARIA)	Gold	35,000^{‡}
United Kingdom (BPI)	Silver	200,000^{‡}
^{‡} Sales+streaming figures based on certification alone.
