= Jimmy Cooks =

2022 single by Drake

Single by Drake featuring 21 Savage

from the album Honestly, Nevermind
- Released: October 11, 2022
- Recorded: 2022
- Genre: Trap
- Length: 3:38
- Label: OVO; Republic
- Songwriters: Aubrey Graham; Shéyaa Bin Abraham-Joseph Hyacinth Lorraine Henry; Brytavious Chambers; Anderson Hernandez; Kevin Gomringer; Tim Gomringer; Douglas Ford; Ibn Young; Harry Ray; Al Goodman; Walter Morris; Artem Teslenko
- Producers: Vinylz; Tay Keith; Cubeatz; Tizzle

Drake and 21 Savage singles chronology
"Knife Talk" (2021)	"Jimmy Cooks" (2022)	"Rich Flex" (2022)

Drake singles chronology
"Staying Alive" (2022)	"Jimmy Cooks" (2022)	"Rich Flex" (2022)

21 Savage singles chronology
"New Money" (2022)	"Jimmy Cooks" (2022)	"Rich Flex" (2022)

Music video
- "Jimmy Cooks" on YouTube

"Jimmy Cooks" is a song by Canadian rapper Drake featuring British-American rapper 21 Savage, released on June 17, 2022, as the final track from the former's seventh studio album Honestly, Nevermind (2022), with the latter being the only guest appearance on the album. The song was initially planned to appear on the two’s collaborative album Her Loss but did not make the final cut.

Dubbed a standout track by HotNewHipHop, the song debuted at number one on the US Billboard Hot 100 four months prior to its official release as a single, becoming Drake's eleventh and 21 Savage's second number-one hit on the chart. Later, the song impacted contemporary hit radio on October 11, as the album's third single.

== Music video ==
The accompanying music video was released on October 23 and served as an announcement of the two rappers' collaborative album Her Loss, which was released on November 4.

== Composition ==
Generally, the song gives an insight into Drake's "professional journey" and makes reference to his former career in acting. The song samples "Just Awaken Shaken" by Playa Fly in its introduction. It then switches to an instrumental with a sped-up sample of "You Were Gone" by Brook Benton.

The sound of the song was described as "Memphis-flavored" and was noted for its "rare" rap elements on an album full of dance songs. It was produced by Tay Keith, CuBeatz, Tizzle, and Vinylz. References include NBA duo Shaquille O'Neal and the late Kobe Bryant, as well as the slapping incident of Will Smith and Chris Rock at the 94th Academy Awards. The rappers also pay homage to the late artists Lil Keed and DJ Kay Slay. Rapper J. Cole makes a short cameo on the song. The song's title is based off of Drake's Degrassi: The Next Generation character, Jimmy Brooks.

== Critical reception ==
Justin Curto at Vulture praised Drake's performance for reaching "just about full crooner mode here", while 21 Savage's appearance elevated the song to making it "the most high-energy, lucid moment of the record". Armon Sadler of Uproxx thought the song was "seemingly a part two to Certified Lover Boy's "Knife Talk"" and described the track as "equal parts fun, cocky, and hype, commonplace for the two rappers listed". Billboard's Michael Saponara called it the best song on Honestly, Nevermind, pointing out that Drake "had to remind listeners he's at the top of the food chain in the rap game by saving the best for last".

== Charts ==
=== Weekly charts ===
Weekly chart performance for "Jimmy Cooks"
Chart (2022)	Peak position
Australia (ARIA)	4
Austria (Ö3 Austria Top 40)	12
Canada Hot 100 (Billboard)	1
Denmark (Tracklisten)	34
France (SNEP)	98
Germany (GfK)	34
Global 200 (Billboard)	3
Greece International (IFPI)	2
Iceland (Tónlistinn)	5
Ireland (IRMA)	9
Italy (FIMI)	98
Lithuania (AGATA)	14
Luxembourg (Billboard)	4
Netherlands (Single Top 100)	24
New Zealand (Recorded Music NZ)	3
Portugal (AFP)	18
Romania (Billboard)	25
Slovakia (Singles Digitál Top 100)	71
South Africa Streaming (TOSAC)	1
Sweden (Sverigetopplistan)	45
Switzerland (Schweizer Hitparade)	5
UK Singles (Official Charts)	7
UK Hip Hop/R&B (Official Charts)	1
US Billboard Hot 100	1
US Hot R&B/Hip-Hop Songs (Billboard)	1
US Pop Airplay (Billboard)	36
US Rhythmic Airplay (Billboard)	1

=== Year-end charts ===
2022 year-end chart performance for "Jimmy Cooks"
Chart (2022)	Position
Australia (ARIA)	64
Canada (Canadian Hot 100)	26
Global 200 (Billboard)	81
Switzerland (Schweizer Hitparade)	96
US Billboard Hot 100	33
US Hot R&B/Hip-Hop Songs (Billboard)	8
US Rhythmic (Billboard)	18

2023 year-end chart performance for "Jimmy Cooks"
Chart (2023)	Position
Australia (ARIA)	95
Global 200 (Billboard)	75
US Hot R&B/Hip-Hop Songs (Billboard)	84

== Certifications ==
Certifications for "Jimmy Cooks"
Region	Certification	Certified units/sales
Australia (ARIA)	4× Platinum	280,000^{‡}
Brazil (Pro-Música Brasil)	Platinum	40,000^{‡}
Denmark (IFPI Danmark)	Platinum	90,000^{‡}
France (SNEP)	Gold	100,000^{‡}
Italy (FIMI)	Gold	50,000^{‡}
New Zealand (RMNZ)	3× Platinum	90,000^{‡}
Poland (ZPAV)	Platinum	50,000^{‡}
Portugal (AFP)	Gold	5,000^{‡}
Spain (Promusicae)	Gold	30,000^{‡}
United Kingdom (BPI)	Platinum	600,000^{‡}
United States (RIAA)	3× Platinum	3,000,000^{‡}
Streaming
Greece (IFPI Greece)	Platinum	2,000,000^{†}
^{‡} Sales+streaming figures based on certification alone.^{†} Streaming-only figures based on certification alone.

== Release history ==
Release history for "Jimmy Cooks"
Region	Date	Format	Label	Ref.
United States	October 11, 2022	Rhythmic contemporary	Republic; OVO	
Italy	October 28, 2022	Radio airplay	Universal	
