= Rich Flex =

2022 song by Drake and 21 Savage

Single by Drake and 21 Savage

from the album Her Loss
- Released: November 11, 2022
- Recorded: 2021–2022
- Studio: The Chapel (Toronto)
- Genre: Hip hop; trap
- Length: 3:59
- Label: OVO; Republic
- Songwriters: Aubrey Graham; Shéyaa Abraham-Joseph; Anderson Hernandez; Brytavious Chambers; Michael Mulé; Isaac De Boni; Jahmal Gwin; Megan Pete; Anthony White; Bobby Session Jr.; Clifford Harris Jr.; Aldrin Davis; Gladys Hayes; Charles Bernstein
- Producers: Vinylz; Tay Keith; FnZ (add.); BoogzDaBeast (co.)

Drake and 21 Savage singles chronology
"Jimmy Cooks" (2022)	"Rich Flex" (2022)	"Circo Loco" (2022)

Drake singles chronology
"Jimmy Cooks" (2022)	"Rich Flex" (2022)	"Circo Loco" (2022)

21 Savage singles chronology
"Jimmy Cooks" (2022)	"Rich Flex" (2022)	"Circo Loco" (2022)

Audio
- "Rich Flex" on YouTube

"Rich Flex" is a song by Canadian rapper Drake and Atlanta-based rapper 21 Savage from their collaborative studio album Her Loss (2022). It was sent to US rhythmic radio on November 11, 2022, as the lead single from the album. The song interpolates "Savage" (2020) by Megan Thee Stallion, "24's" (2003) by T.I., and 21 Savage's own "Red Opps" (2016), as well as sampling "I Want You, Girl" (1973) by Sugar and "Nora's Transformation" (1973) by Charles Bernstein. The song spent its first three weeks on the Billboard Hot 100 chart at number two (tying "My Life" as 21 Savage's highest-charting song as a lead artist), blocked from reaching the top spot by Taylor Swift's "Anti-Hero" and peaked at number one on the Canadian Hot 100 chart where it became Drake's eleventh number one single. The song also topped the Billboard Global 200, becoming Drake's second and 21 Savage's first song to do so.

== Background ==
On November 3, 2022, the song was announced as part of the tracklist reveal for Her Loss. Shortly after release, the track garnered attention and went viral due to the chorus's lyrical content. The track in particular was widely picked out since it features an interpolation of Megan Thee Stallion's "Savage", including writing credits, while another song on the album titled "Circo Loco" sparked controversy as Drake allegedly accused Stallion of lying about the 2020 shooting incident, involving her and rapper Tory Lanez. However, Lil Yachty, who contributed to numerous tracks on Her Loss, confirmed on behalf of Drake that the lyric was in fact about women who lie about getting butt injections (hence the words 'shot' and 'stallion', which is slang for a woman with large buttocks).

== Composition ==
Serving as the "tough, bass-driven" opener for the album, "Rich Flex" sees the two rappers "going back and forth" after a spoken intro performed by rapper Young Nudy. The track starts out with Drake repeatedly asking Savage to do him a favor over a "typically spare Tay Keith beat", while the latter "raps about strip club exploits at Magic City and pistol-whipping an enemy", occasionally imitating the flow of Stallion's "Savage". Similar to their previous collaboration on "Jimmy Cooks", the song makes use of a beat switch over halfway through the track, with Drake riding "a crashing piano beat". The song was seen as a return to "rap-mode" for Drake after having ventured into house music with Honestly, Nevermind (2022).

== Critical reception ==
21 Savage in particular was praised for his appearance on the song. In a track review for the song, Matthew Ritchie at Pitchfork opined that the presence of Savage "makes Drake confront the idea of his own rap mortality" and lets him realize that he cannot "coast on vibe alone" when met with "real skill" alongside his appearance. Rolling Stone's Mosi Reeves pointed out the track for letting the album start out "promisingly", stating that it serves as a "decent introduction that allows [21 Savage] to skate around impropriety". Marcus Shorter of Consequence noted that, by taking turns, the rappers "mirror each other's cadences and rhyme patterns while attacking the same subject matter from slightly different angles".

The song received two nominations at the 66th Annual Grammy Awards: Best Rap Performance & Best Rap Song.

== Charts ==
=== Weekly charts ===
Weekly chart performance for "Rich Flex"
Chart (2022–2023)	Peak position
Australia (ARIA)	3
Austria (Ö3 Austria Top 40)	10
Belgium (Ultratop 50 Flanders)	50
Canada Hot 100 (Billboard)	1
Croatia (Billboard)	13
Czech Republic Singles Digital (ČNS IFPI)	23
Denmark (Tracklisten)	12
France (SNEP)	74
Germany (GfK)	42
Global 200 (Billboard)	1
Greece International (IFPI)	1
Hungary (Stream Top 40)	21
Iceland (Tónlistinn)	2
Ireland (IRMA)	3
Italy (FIMI)	40
Latvia (LAIPA)	7
Lithuania (AGATA)	3
Luxembourg (Billboard)	4
MENA (IFPI)	14
Netherlands (Single Top 100)	12
New Zealand (Recorded Music NZ)	2
Nigeria (TurnTable Top 100)	41
Norway (VG-lista)	10
Poland (Polish Streaming Top 100)	93
Portugal (AFP)	5
Romania (Billboard)	9
Singapore (RIAS)	11
Slovakia (Singles Digitál Top 100)	7
South Africa (RISA)	1
Sweden (Sverigetopplistan)	16
Switzerland (Schweizer Hitparade)	4
UK Singles (Official Charts)	3
UK Hip Hop/R&B (Official Charts)	1
UK Independent (Official Charts)	4
US Billboard Hot 100	2
US Hot R&B/Hip-Hop Songs (Billboard)	1
US Pop Airplay (Billboard)	36
US Rhythmic Airplay (Billboard)	1

=== Year-end charts ===
Year-end chart performance for "Rich Flex"
Chart (2023)	Position
Australia (ARIA)	82
Canada (Canadian Hot 100)	18
Global 200 (Billboard)	34
US Billboard Hot 100	14
US Hot R&B/Hip-Hop Songs (Billboard)	5
US Rhythmic (Billboard)	10

== Certifications ==
Certifications for "Rich Flex"
Region	Certification	Certified units/sales
Australia (ARIA)	3× Platinum	210,000^{‡}
Belgium (BRMA)	Gold	20,000^{‡}
Brazil (Pro-Música Brasil)	Gold	20,000^{‡}
Denmark (IFPI Danmark)	Gold	45,000^{‡}
Italy (FIMI)	Gold	50,000^{‡}
New Zealand (RMNZ)	2× Platinum	60,000^{‡}
Poland (ZPAV)	Platinum	50,000^{‡}
United Kingdom (BPI)	Platinum	600,000^{‡}
United States (RIAA)	5× Platinum	5,000,000^{‡}
Streaming
Greece (IFPI Greece)	Platinum	2,000,000^{†}
^{‡} Sales+streaming figures based on certification alone.^{†} Streaming-only figures based on certification alone.
