= Spin Bout U =

2022 song by Drake and 21 Savage

Single by Drake and 21 Savage

from the album Her Loss
- Released: February 24, 2023
- Recorded: 2022
- Studio: Leading by Example (Atlanta)
- Genre: Hip hop; Trap; R&B
- Length: 3:34
- Label: OVO; Republic
- Songwriters: Aubrey Graham; Shéyaa Abraham-Joseph; Marquell Jones; Noah Shebib; Tenaia Sanders; Dwayne Armstrong
- Producers: Banbwoi; 40 (add.)

Drake and 21 Savage singles chronology
"Circo Loco" (2022)	"Spin Bout U" (2023)	"Mr. Recoup" (2025)

Drake singles chronology
"We Caa Done" (2023)	"Spin Bout U" (2023)	"Search & Rescue" (2023)

21 Savage singles chronology
"Creepin'" (2023)	"Spin Bout U" (2023)	"06 Gucci" (2023)

Music video
- "Spin Bout U" on YouTube

"Spin Bout U" is a song by Canadian rapper Drake and Atlanta-based rapper 21 Savage from their collaborative studio album Her Loss (2022). It was sent to US rhythmic radio on February 24, 2023, as the third single from the album alongside a music video. Produced by Banbwoi and 40, it contains samples of "Give Me Your Lovin" by Oobie. The song peaked at number five on the Billboard Hot 100.

The song received a nomination for Best Melodic Rap Performance at the 66th Annual Grammy Awards.

== Content ==
Lyrically, the song sees Drake and 21 Savage expressing their love and care for their respective partners; Savage brings up wanting to follow his lover's "Finsta". Drake reveals his opposition to the overturning of Roe v. Wade, dismissing legislators who support it as "men who never got pussy in school" and stating he will protect his partner as a result, while also rapping about making a woman famous through one phone call.

== Critical reception ==
The song was met with a generally positive reception. Matthew Ritchie of HipHopDX called it "the best example of the pairing's chemistry" in a review of Her Loss, also writing that "The toe the line between sensitive and corny". RapReviews' Steve "Flash" Juon praised the lyrics that show Drake's stance on abortion. Josh Svetz of Paste wrote, "The track lets 21 expand his range, while also putting Drake in a spot of comfort, allowing both artists to shine."

== Music video ==
The official music video was released on February 24, 2023. Directed by Dave Meyers, it begins with the rappers lavishly enjoying themselves on a private yacht; 21 Savage raps as he prepares fruit, slicing cara cara oranges, and lights a cigar with a dollar bill, while Drake enjoys fresh ocean air on the boat's deck above. From binoculars, 21 spots a woman (played by Precious Lee) drowning in the ocean. They save her with a flotation device and bring her on board, then provide her a meal. As night falls, Drake spends time with the woman and treats her to a glass of champagne. Meanwhile, a group of women approach and enter the yacht from their boat and destroy a surveillance camera. The woman seduces Drake, tricking him into going for a kiss before blowing a white, powdered substance into his face, drugging him. The beat of the song slowly warps as Drake hallucinates and loses consciousness. Upon waking up, Drake and 21 Savage find themselves tied up and handcuffed, and it is revealed the woman they rescued is in league with the invaders. The rappers are held hostage as the crew of women ransack and vandalize the yacht, robbing their jewelry, guns, money and marijuana, smashing photos hanging on the wall, shooting up and eventually burning the ship. One of the pirates spray paints "His Loss" over the "Her Loss" logo of the yacht and a few of them push a helicopter overboard. With a gun to his head, Drake opens a safe and hands over his "Previous Engagements" chain, while Savage gets a heart tattoo over the dagger tattoo on his forehead. As the yacht is engulfed in flames, the women execute Drake, who falls into the sea, and shoot at Savage as he jumps off the ship in an attempt to escape. After that, the pirates drive away in their boat with the stolen luxuries from the yacht as it explodes.

== Charts ==
=== Weekly charts ===
Weekly chart performance for "Spin Bout U"
Chart (2022–2023)	Peak position
Australia (ARIA)	55
Canada Hot 100 (Billboard)	9
France (SNEP)	150
Global 200 (Billboard)	7
Greece International (IFPI)	6
Iceland (Tónlistinn)	13
Lithuania (AGATA)	27
Luxembourg (Billboard)	17
Portugal (AFP)	26
South Africa (RISA)	7
Sweden (Sverigetopplistan)	77
UK Audio Streaming (Official Charts)	16
UK Hip Hop/R&B (Official Charts)	7
US Billboard Hot 100	5
US Hot R&B/Hip-Hop Songs (Billboard)	4
US Rhythmic Airplay (Billboard)	2

=== Year-end charts ===
Year-end chart performance for "Spin Bout U"
Chart (2023)	Position
Canada (Canadian Hot 100)	98
US Billboard Hot 100	43
US Hot R&B/Hip-Hop Songs (Billboard)	19
US Rhythmic (Billboard)	20

== Certifications ==
Certifications for "Spin Bout U"
Region	Certification	Certified units/sales
Australia (ARIA)	Platinum	70,000^{‡}
Canada (Music Canada)	2× Platinum	160,000^{‡}
New Zealand (RMNZ)	Platinum	30,000^{‡}
United Kingdom (BPI)	Silver	200,000^{‡}
^{‡} Sales+streaming figures based on certification alone.

== Awards and nominations ==
Award and nominations for "Spin Bout U"
Year	Ceremony	Award	Result	Ref.
2023	BET Hip Hop Awards	Best Hip Hop Video	Nominated	
2023	Grammy Awards	Best Melodic Rap Performance	Nominated	
