= Metro Boomin discography =

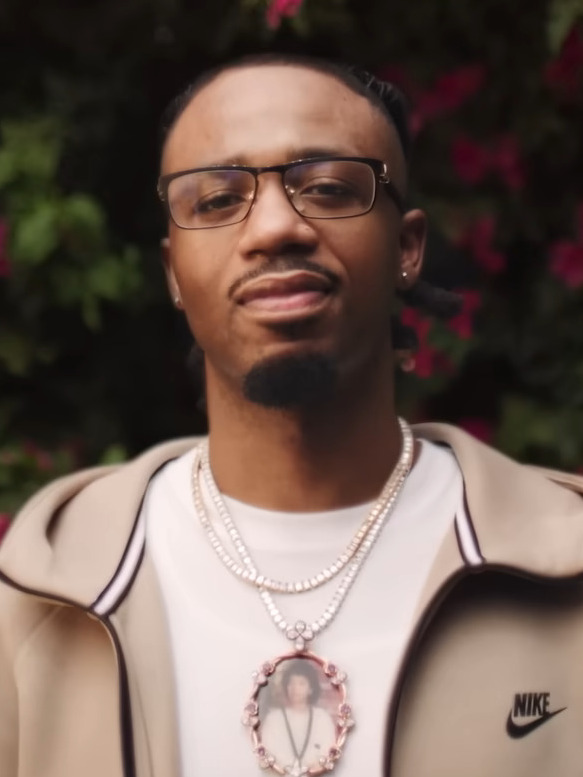
- Studio albums: 2
- EPs: 1
- Singles: 13
- Music videos: 24
- Mixtapes: 1
- Collaborative mixtapes: 1
- Collaborative albums: 5
- Soundtrack albums: 1

The discography of American record producer Metro Boomin consists of two studio albums, five collaborative albums, one soundtrack album, two mixtapes, one extended play, and 21 singles (including six as a featured artist).

On July 22, 2016, Metro released a collaborative extended play with 21 Savage titled Savage Mode. The EP reached number 23 on the Billboard 200. It produced the top-40 single, "X", which features Future and reached number 36 on the Billboard Hot 100. On July 21, 2017, he released a collaborative mixtape with Nav titled Perfect Timing. The mixtape debuted and peaked at number 13 on the Billboard 200. On October 31, 2017, Metro released a collaborative album with 21 Savage and Offset titled Without Warning. The album reached number four on the Billboard Hot 100. It produced the top-20 single, "Ric Flair Drip", which was performed without 21 Savage and reached number 13 on the Hot 100. On December 8, 2017, Metro released a collaborative album with Big Sean titled Double or Nothing. The album reached number six on the Billboard 200.

On November 2, 2018, Metro released his debut studio album, Not All Heroes Wear Capes. The album debuted atop the Billboard 200, giving Metro his first chart-topping project. On October 2, 2020, Metro released a collaborative album with 21 Savage titled Savage Mode II, a sequel to their 2016 EP. The album debuted and peaked atop the Billboard 200, giving him his second chart-topping project, that too in a row. It produced the top-10 singles, "Runnin" and "Mr. Right Now", the latter of which features Drake; the songs debuted at numbers nine and ten on the Hot 100, respectively.

On December 2, 2022, Metro released his second studio album, Heroes & Villains. The album debuted and peaked atop the Billboard 200, giving Metro his third chart-topping project, that too in a row. It produced two top-10 singles, "Creepin'", a collaboration with the Weeknd and 21 Savage, and "Superhero (Heroes & Villains)", a collaboration with Future and Chris Brown; the songs debuted at numbers three and seven on the Billboard Hot 100, respectively. On June 2, 2023, Metro released his first soundtrack album, which was for the film Spider-Man: Across the Spider-Verse. The album reached number five on the Billboard 200. In 2024, he released a collaboration with 21 Savage and Travis Scott titled "Née-Nah", which debuted and peaked at number 10 on the Hot 100. On March 22, 2024, Metro released a collaborative studio album with Future titled We Don't Trust You. The album debuted atop the Billboard 200. It produced his first number-one single, "Like That", a collaboration with Kendrick Lamar, and also became his first song to debut at the top of the Hot 100. The album also produced the top-10 singles, "Type Shit" with Travis Scott and Playboi Carti (charted at number two) and "Young Metro", with the Weeknd (charted at number nine). The album also produced two more top-10 songs, "Cinderella" with Travis Scott (charted at number six) and the title track (charted at number eight). On April 12, 2024, Metro released another collaborative studio album with Future titled We Still Don't Trust You. The album debuted and peaked atop the Billboard 200. It produced the top-40 single, the title track, which is a collaboration with the Weeknd and debuted at number 22 on the Hot 100.

== Albums ==
=== Studio albums ===
List of studio albums, with selected chart positions.
Title	Album details	Peak chart positions										Certifications
Title	Album details	US	US R&B/ HH	US Rap	AUS	CAN	DEN	FRA	IRE	NZ	UK	Certifications
Not All Heroes Wear Capes	Released: November 2, 2018; Label: Boominati, Republic; Format: Streaming, digital download, CD, LP	1	1	1	18	2	5	—	11	9	16	RIAA: Platinum; ARIA: Gold; BPI: Gold; IFPI DEN: Gold; MC: 2× Platinum; SNEP: Gold
Heroes & Villains	Released: December 2, 2022; Label: Boominati, Republic; Format: Streaming, digital download, CD, LP	1	1	1	5	1	1	20	3	1	3	RIAA: 2× Platinum; ARIA: Platinum; BPI: Platinum; IFPI DEN: Platinum; MC: Platinum; RMNZ: Platinum; SNEP: Platinum
"" denotes a recording that did not chart or was not released in that territory.

=== Collaborative albums ===
List of collaborative albums, with selected chart positions.
Title	Album details	Peak chart positions										Certifications
Title	Album details	US	US R&B/ HH	US Rap	AUS	CAN	DEN	FRA	IRE	NZ	UK	Certifications
Without Warning (with 21 Savage and Offset)	Released: October 31, 2017; Label: Slaughter Gang, Epic, Quality Control, Motown, Capitol, Boominati, Republic; Format: Streaming, digital download, LP	4	2	1	39	5	8	76	—	15	41	BPI: Silver
Double or Nothing (with Big Sean)	Released: December 8, 2017; Label: GOOD, Def Jam, Boominati, Republic; Format: Streaming, digital download, CD, LP	6	2	2	—	15	—	164	—	—	96	
Savage Mode II (with 21 Savage)	Released: October 2, 2020; Label: Slaughter Gang, Epic, Boominati, Republic; Format: Streaming, digital download, CD, LP	1	1	1	4	1	3	15	4	5	10	RIAA: 2× Platinum; BPI: Gold; IFPI DEN: Gold; MC: 2× Platinum
We Don't Trust You (with Future)	Released: March 22, 2024; Label: Freebandz, Boominati, Epic, Republic; Format: CD, Streaming, digital download	1	1	1	2	1	3	4	4	1	2	RIAA: Platinum; BPI: Gold; MC: Platinum; RMNZ: Gold
We Still Don't Trust You (with Future)	Released: April 12, 2024; Label: Freebandz, Boominati, Epic, Republic; Format: Streaming, digital download	1	1	1	15	2	8	12	15	6	11	BPI: Silver
"" denotes a recording that did not chart or was not released in that territory.

=== Soundtrack albums ===
List of soundtrack albums, with selected chart positions.
Title	Album details	Peak chart positions									
Title	Album details	US	US R&B/ HH	US Rap	AUS	CAN	DEN	FRA	IRE Comp	NZ	UK Comp
Metro Boomin Presents Spider-Man: Across the Spider-Verse (Soundtrack from and Inspired by the Motion Picture)	Released: June 2, 2023; Label: Boominati, Republic; Format: Streaming, digital download, CD	5	1	1	2	2	16	18	1	2	1

== Mixtapes ==
List of mixtapes, with selected chart positions
Title	Album details	Peak chart positions						Certifications
Title	Album details	US	US R&B/HH	US Rap	CAN	FRA	UK	Certifications
19 & Boomin	Released: October 7, 2013; Label: Self-released; Format: Digital download	—	—	—	—	—	—	
Perfect Timing (with Nav)	Released: July 21, 2017; Label: Boominati, XO, Republic; Format: Streaming, digital download	13	7	7	7	191	61	RIAA: Gold; MC: Gold
A Futuristic Summa	Released: August 1, 2025; Label: Boominati, Mercury, Republic; Format: Streaming, digital download	23	10	7	92	—	—	
"—" denotes a recording that did not chart or was not released in that territory.

== Extended plays ==
Extended play with selected chart positions
Title	Details	Peak chart positions			Certifications
Title	Details	US	US R&B/ HH	US Rap	Certifications
Savage Mode (with 21 Savage)	Released: July 15, 2016; Label: Self-released; Format: LP, Digital download	23	9	7	RIAA: Gold

== Singles ==
=== As lead artist ===
List of singles as a lead artist, with selected chart positions
Title	Year	Peak chart positions										Certifications	Album
Title	Year	US	US R&B /HH	US Rap	AUS	CAN	FRA	IRE	NZ	UK	WW	Certifications	Album
"Chanel Vintage" (featuring Future and Young Thug)	2014	—	—	—	—	—	—	—	—	—	—		19 & Boomin
"X" (with 21 Savage featuring Future)	2016	36	12	10	—	66	—	—	—	—	—	RIAA: 5× Platinum; BPI: Silver; MC: 2× Platinum	Savage Mode
"No Heart" (with 21 Savage)	2016	43	17	12	—	79	—	—	—	—	—	RIAA: 4× Platinum; BPI: Silver; MC: Platinum	Savage Mode
"No Complaints" (featuring Offset and Drake)	2017	71	31	22	—	51	—	—	— (Note: "No Complaints" did not enter the NZ Top 40 Singles Chart, but peaked at number six on the NZ Heatseeler Chart.)	—	—	RIAA: Platinum; ARIA: Gold; MC: 2× Platinum	Not All Heroes Wear Capes
"Perfect Timing (Intro)" (with Nav)	2017	—	—	—	—	89	—	—	—	—	—		Perfect Timing
"Call Me" (with Nav)	2017	— (Note: "Call Me" did not enter the Billboard Hot 100, but peaked at number 25 on the Bubbling Under Hot 100 chart.)	— (Note: "Call Me" did not enter the Billboard Hot R&B/Hip-Hop Songs chart, but peaked at number three on the Bubbling Under R&B/Hip-Hop Singles chart.)	—	—	65	—	—	—	—	—	RIAA: Platinum; MC: Platinum	Perfect Timing
"Blue Pill" (featuring Travis Scott)	2017	—	—	—	—	—	—	—	—	—	—		Non-album single
"Ric Flair Drip" (with Offset)	2018	13	11	8	61	13	—	75	—	67	—	RIAA: 6× Platinum; ARIA: Platinum; BPI: Platinum; MC: 4× Platinum; SNEP: Platinum	Without Warning
"Pull Up N Wreck" (with Big Sean featuring 21 Savage)	2018	80	33	—	—	—	—	—	—	—	—		Double or Nothing
"So Good" (with Big Sean featuring Kash Doll)	2018	— (Note: "So Good" did not enter the Billboard Hot 100, but peaked at number 13 on the Bubbling Under Hot 100 chart.)	—	—	—	—	—	—	—	—	—	RIAA: Platinum	Double or Nothing
"Space Cadet" (featuring Gunna)	2019	51	22	18	—	40	—	—	— (Note: "Space Cadet" did not enter the NZ Top 40 Singles Chart, but peaked at number 13 on the NZ Hot Singles Chart.)	—	—	RIAA: 4× Platinum; ARIA: 2× Platinum; BPI: Gold; MC: 5× Platinum; SNEP: Gold	Not All Heroes Wear Capes
"Runnin" (with 21 Savage)	2020	9	5	5	52	13	115	28	— (Note: "Runnin" did not enter the NZ Top 40 Singles Chart, but peaked at number five on the NZ Hot Singles Chart.)	43	9	RIAA: 5× Platinum; MC: Gold; BPI: Silver	Savage Mode II
"Mr. Right Now" (with 21 Savage featuring Drake)	2020	10	6	6	39	9	125	23	— (Note: "Mr. Right Now" did not enter the NZ Top 40 Singles Chart, but peaked at number three on the NZ Hot Singles Chart.)	28	10	RIAA: 3× Platinum; MC: Gold	Savage Mode II
"Creepin'" (with the Weeknd and 21 Savage)	2022	3	1	—	7	1	8	8	6	7	3	RIAA: 4× Platinum; ARIA: 4× Platinum; BPI: Platinum; MC: 3× Platinum; RMNZ: Platinum; SNEP: Diamond	Heroes & Villains
"Superhero (Heroes & Villains)" (with Future and Chris Brown)	2023	8	2	1	30	7	94	22	29	34	8	RIAA: 4× Platinum; ARIA: 3× Platinum; BPI: Gold; MC: 2× Platinum; SNEP: Gold	Heroes & Villains
"Calling" (with Swae Lee and Nav featuring A Boogie wit da Hoodie)	2023	41	13	8	27	18	189	59	25	56	21	ARIA: Gold	Spider-Man: Across the Spider-Verse (Soundtrack from and Inspired by the Motion Picture)
"Née-Nah" (with 21 Savage and Travis Scott)	2024	10	5	4	34	8	108	27	23	23	8	RIAA: Platinum; MC: Platinum	American Dream
"Type Shit" (with Future, Travis Scott, and Playboi Carti)	2024	2	2	2	29	8	91	26	23	18	6	ARIA: Gold; BPI: Gold; MC: 2× Platinum; RMNZ: Gold	We Don't Trust You
"Young Metro" (with Future and the Weeknd)	2024	9	6	6	68	17	111	—	—	— (Note: "Young Metro" did not enter the UK Singles Chart, as chart rules only allow three songs per artist to chart within the top one hundred at a time, but peaked at number 47 on the UK Streaming Chart.)	15	MC: Gold	We Don't Trust You
"Like That" (with Future and Kendrick Lamar)	2024	1	1	1	8	1	66	10	2	6	1	ARIA: Platinum; BPI: Platinum; MC: 3× Platinum; RMNZ: Gold	We Don't Trust You
"We Still Don't Trust You" (with Future and the Weeknd)	2024	22	—	—	66	21	—	57	— (Note: "We Still Don't Trust You" did not enter the NZ Top 40 Singles Chart, but peaked at number five on the NZ Hot Singles Chart.)	49	21	MC: Gold	We Still Don't Trust You
"Real Me" (with Nav)	2025	—	—	—	—	—	—	—	—	—	—		OMW2 Rexdale
"Take Me Thru Dere" (with Quavo, Breskii and YK Niece)	2025	51	10	7	—	—	—	—	—	—	—		A Futuristic Summa
"—" denotes a recording that did not chart or was not released in that territory.

=== As featured artist ===
List of singles as a featured artist, with selected chart positions
Title	Year	Peak chart positions	Album
Title	Year	US Bub.	Album
"Voices" (GE Da Piolet featuring Metro Boomin)	2015	—	Non-album singles
"Trap Phone" (Slim Dollars featuring Metro Boomin)	2017	—	Non-album singles
"Mile High" (James Blake featuring Travis Scott and Metro Boomin)	2019	22	Assume Form
"Go Viral" (Joe Moses featuring Future and Metro Boomin)	2019	—	Westside
"Dead Meat 2.0" (Jay Rose and Hester Shawty featuring Metro Boomin)	2019	—	Non-album singles
"Striker #1 Remix" (Cécé featuring Metro Boomin)	2021	—	Non-album singles
"That's It" (Yung Lean featuring Metro Boomin and Future)	2026	—	Grand Theft Auto VI: The Album
"—" denotes a recording that did not chart or was not released in that territory.

== Other charted and certified songs ==
List of other charted songs, with selected chart positions
Title	Year	Peak chart positions										Certifications	Album
Title	Year	US	US R&B/HH	US Rap	AUS	CAN	FRA	IRE	NZ	UK	WW	Certifications	Album
"No Advance" (with 21 Savage)	2016	—	—	—	—	—	—	—	—	—	—	RIAA: Gold	Savage Mode
"Savage Mode" (with 21 Savage)	2016	—	—	—	—	—	—	—	—	—	—	RIAA: Gold	Savage Mode
"Ocean Drive" (with 21 Savage)	2016	—	—	—	—	—	—	—	—	—	—	RIAA: Gold	Savage Mode
"ASAP Ferg" (with Nav featuring Lil Uzi Vert)	2017	—	—	—	—	88	—	—	—	—	—		Perfect Timing
"Held Me Down" (with Nav)	2017	—	—	—	—	—	—	—	—	—	—	MC: Gold	Perfect Timing
"Minute" (with Nav featuring Playboi Carti and Offset)	2017	— (Note: "Minute" did not enter the Billboard Hot 100, but peaked at number 21 on the Bubbling Under Hot 100 chart.)	—	—	—	76	—	—	—	—	—	RIAA: Platinum; MC: Platinum	Perfect Timing
"Ghostface Killers" (with 21 Savage and Offset featuring Travis Scott)	2017	35	14	13	69	14	—	—	—	60	—	RIAA: 2× Platinum; ARIA: Gold; BPI: Silver; MC: Platinum	Without Warning
"Rap Saved Me" (with 21 Savage and Offset featuring Quavo)	2017	64	26	21	—	46	—	—	—	—	—	RIAA: Platinum	Without Warning
"My Choppa Hate Niggas" (with 21 Savage)	2017	73	30	—	—	57	—	—	—	—	—	RIAA: Gold	Without Warning
"Nightmare" (with Offset)	2017	100	43	—	—	72	—	—	—	—	—		Without Warning
"Mad Stalkers" (with 21 Savage and Offset)	2017	99	42	—	—	77	—	—	—	—	—	RIAA: Gold	Without Warning
"Disrespectful" (with 21 Savage and Offset)	2017	— (Note: "Disrespectful" did not enter the Billboard Hot 100, but peaked at number four on the Bubbling Under Hot 100 Singles chart.)	48	—	—	87	—	—	—	—	—	RIAA: Gold	Without Warning
"Run Up the Racks" (with 21 Savage)	2017	— (Note: "Run Up the Racks" did not enter the Billboard Hot 100, but peaked at number 15 on the Bubbling Under Hot 100 Singles chart.)	—	—	—	95	—	—	—	—	—		Without Warning
"Still Serving" (with 21 Savage and Offset)	2017	— (Note: "Still Serving" did not enter the Billboard Hot 100, but peaked at number 14 on the Bubbling Under Hot 100 Singles chart.)	—	—	—	—	—	—	—	—	—	RIAA: Gold	Without Warning
"Go Legend" (with Big Sean featuring Travis Scott)	2017	67	28	—	—	59	—	—	—	—	—		Double or Nothing
"10AM / Save the World" (featuring Gucci Mane)	2018	— (Note: "10AM / Save the World" did not enter the US Billboard Hot 100, but peaked at number eight on the Bubbling Under Hot 100 chart.)	—	—	—	—	—	—	—	—	—		Not All Heroes Wear Capes
"Overdue" (featuring Travis Scott)	2018	62	30	—	—	67	—	—	— (Note: "Overdue" did not enter the NZ Top 40 Singles Chart, but peaked at number nine on the NZ Hot Singles Chart.)	86	—	RIAA: Platinum; ARIA: Platinum; MC: Platinum	Not All Heroes Wear Capes
"Don't Come Out the House" (featuring 21 Savage)	2018	38	18	18	—	47	—	66	— (Note: "Don't Come Out the House" did not enter the NZ Top 40 Singles Chart, but peaked at number seven on the NZ Hot Singles Chart.)	80	—	RIAA: Platinum; ARIA: Gold; MC: Platinum	Not All Heroes Wear Capes
"Dreamcatcher" (featuring Swae Lee and Travis Scott)	2018	72	36	—	—	68	—	87	—	—	—	ARIA: Gold; MC: Platinum	Not All Heroes Wear Capes
"10 Freaky Girls" (featuring 21 Savage)	2018	42	20	20	—	39	—	58	— (Note: "10 Freaky Girls" did not enter the NZ Top 40 Singles Chart, but peaked at number five on the NZ Hot Singles Chart.)	69	—	RIAA: 3× Platinum; ARIA: 2× Platinum; BPI: Gold; MC: 4× Platinum	Not All Heroes Wear Capes
"Up to Something" (featuring Travis Scott and Young Thug)	2018	100	—	—	—	96	—	—	—	—	—		Not All Heroes Wear Capes
"Only 1 (Interlude)" (featuring Travis Scott)	2018	— (Note: "Only 1 (Interlude)" did not enter the US Billboard Hot 100, but peaked at number 18 on the Bubbling Under Hot 100 chart.)	—	—	—	—	—	—	—	—	—		Not All Heroes Wear Capes
"Lesbian" (featuring Gunna and Young Thug)	2018	— (Note: "Lesbian" did not enter the US Billboard Hot 100, but peaked at number four on the Bubbling Under Hot 100 chart.)	—	—	—	—	—	—	—	—	—	MC: Gold	Not All Heroes Wear Capes
"Borrowed Love" (featuring Swae Lee and Wizkid)	2018	— (Note: "Borrowed Love" did not enter the US Billboard Hot 100, but peaked at number 11 on the Bubbling Under Hot 100 chart.)	—	—	—	93	—	—	—	—	—	MC: Gold	Not All Heroes Wear Capes
"No More" (featuring Travis Scott, Kodak Black, and 21 Savage)	2018	79	40	—	—	71	—	—	—	—	—	MC: Gold	Not All Heroes Wear Capes
"Tell Them" (James Blake featuring Moses Sumney and Metro Boomin)	2019	—	—	—	—	—	—	—	― (Note: "Tell Them" did not enter the NZ Top 40 Singles Chart, but peaked at number 25 on the NZ Hot Singles Chart.)	—	—		Assume Form
"Glock in My Lap" (with 21 Savage)	2020	19	11	10	—	28	160	46	— (Note: "Glock in My Lap" did not enter the NZ Top 40 Singles Chart, but peaked at number 10 on the NZ Hot Singles Chart.)	—	22	RIAA: 4× Platinum; BPI: Gold	Savage Mode II
"Rich Nigga Shit" (with 21 Savage featuring Young Thug)	2020	26	13	12	—	33	147	—	— (Note: "Rich Nigga Shit" did not enter the NZ Top 40 Singles Chart, but peaked at number seven on the NZ Hot Singles Chart.)	54	29	RIAA: 3× Platinum; BPI: Silver	Savage Mode II
"Slidin" (with 21 Savage)	2020	32	15	14	—	39	—	—	—	—	35	RIAA: Platinum	Savage Mode II
"Many Men" (with 21 Savage)	2020	33	16	15	—	16	—	—	— (Note: "Many Men" did not enter the NZ Top 40 Singles Chart, but peaked at number 34 on the NZ Hot Singles Chart.)	—	36	RIAA: Platinum	Savage Mode II
"Snitches & Rats" (with 21 Savage featuring Young Nudy)	2020	61	28	—	—	72	—	—	—	—	71		Savage Mode II
"My Dawg" (with 21 Savage)	2020	56	25	23	—	51	—	—	—	—	63	RIAA: Gold	Savage Mode II
"Steppin on Niggas" (with 21 Savage)	2020	74	31	—	—	90	—	—	—	—	99		Savage Mode II
"Brand New Draco" (with 21 Savage)	2020	57	26	24	—	57	—	—	—	—	65	RIAA: Gold	Savage Mode II
"No Opp Left Behind" (with 21 Savage)	2020	71	30	—	—	78	—	—	—	—	86	RIAA: Gold	Savage Mode II
"RIP Luv" (with 21 Savage)	2020	76	32	—	—	92	—	—	—	—	101	RIAA: Gold	Savage Mode II
"Said N Done" (with 21 Savage)	2020	91	39	—	—	96	—	—	—	—	119	RIAA: Gold	Savage Mode II
"On Time" (with John Legend)	2022	48	17	—	97	33	182	—	—	—	46	MC: Gold	Heroes & Villains
"Too Many Nights" (with Future featuring Don Toliver)	2022	22	6	3	55	12	107	59	27	68	23	RIAA: 3× Platinum; ARIA: 2× Platinum; BPI: Platinum; MC: Platinum; RMNZ: Gold; SNEP: Gold	Heroes & Villains
"Raindrops (Insane)" (with Travis Scott)	2022	31	10	6	67	15	123	—	—	—	30	RIAA: Platinum; MC: Gold	Heroes & Villains
"Umbrella" (with 21 Savage and Young Nudy)	2022	23	7	4	75	14	150	—	—	—	29	MC: Gold	Heroes & Villains
"Trance" (with Travis Scott and Young Thug)	2022	42	14	8	—	24	—	42	― (Note: "Trance" did not enter the NZ Top 40 Singles Chart, but peaked at number 17 on the NZ Hot Singles Chart.)	60	42	RIAA: 3× Platinum; ARIA: Platinum; BPI: Gold; MC: Platinum	Heroes & Villains
"Around Me" (featuring Don Toliver)	2022	53	20	13	—	35	180	—	—	—	56	ARIA: Gold; MC: Gold	Heroes & Villains
"Metro Spider" (with Young Thug)	2022	43	15	9	—	26	—	—	—	—	47	MC: Gold	Heroes & Villains
"I Can't Save You (Interlude)" (with Future featuring Don Toliver)	2022	55	21	15	—	45	—	—	—	—	69		Heroes & Villains
"Niagara Falls (Foot or 2)" (with Travis Scott and 21 Savage)	2022	27	8	5	43	8	154	32	37	46	21	RIAA: Platinum; ARIA: Platinum; MC: Platinum; BPI: Silver	Heroes & Villains
"Walk Em Down (Don't Kill Civilians)" (with 21 Savage featuring Mustafa)	2022	52	19	12	—	28	—	—	—	—	59		Heroes & Villains
"Lock on Me" (with Travis Scott and Future)	2022	72	27	20	—	54	—	—	—	—	98		Heroes & Villains
"Feel the Fiyaaaah" (with ASAP Rocky featuring Takeoff)	2022	59	23	17	—	52	—	—	—	—	83		Heroes & Villains
"All the Money" (with Gunna)	2022	66	25	18	—	57	—	—	—	—	97		Heroes & Villains
"Annihilate" (with Swae Lee, Lil Wayne and Offset)	2023	44	14	9	33	23	166	54	34	59	30	ARIA: Gold	Spider-Man: Across the Spider-Verse (Soundtrack from and Inspired by the Motion Picture)
"Am I Dreaming" (with ASAP Rocky and Roisee)	2023	51	15	11	20	28	135	49	16	51	34	ARIA: Platinum	Spider-Man: Across the Spider-Verse (Soundtrack from and Inspired by the Motion Picture)
"All the Way Live" (with Future and Lil Uzi Vert)	2023	61	21	14	—	50	—	―	—	—	97		Spider-Man: Across the Spider-Verse (Soundtrack from and Inspired by the Motion Picture)
"Hummingbird" (with James Blake)	2023	90	—	—	—	73	—	―	—	—	143		Spider-Man: Across the Spider-Verse (Soundtrack from and Inspired by the Motion Picture)
"Link Up" (with Don Toliver and Wizkid featuring Beam and Toian)	2023	— (Note: "Link Up" did not enter the Billboard Hot 100, but peaked at number four on the Bubbling Under Hot 100 chart.)	—	—	—	69	—	―	—	—	167		Spider-Man: Across the Spider-Verse (Soundtrack from and Inspired by the Motion Picture)
"Self Love" (with Coi Leray)	2023	54	17	15	41	40	—	—	29	—	58	ARIA: Gold	Spider-Man: Across the Spider-Verse (Soundtrack from and Inspired by the Motion Picture)
"Home" (with Don Toliver and Lil Uzi Vert)	2023	— (Note: "Home" did not enter the Billboard Hot 100, but peaked at number one on the Bubbling Under Hot 100 chart.)	39	—	—	79	—	―	—	—	195		Spider-Man: Across the Spider-Verse (Soundtrack from and Inspired by the Motion Picture)
"Nonviolent Communication" (with James Blake, ASAP Rocky and 21 Savage)	2023	— (Note: "Nonviolent Communication" did not enter the Billboard Hot 100, but peaked at number 25 on the Bubbling Under Hot 100 chart.)	—	—	—	—	—	―	—	—	—		Spider-Man: Across the Spider-Verse (Soundtrack from and Inspired by the Motion Picture)
"Pop Ur Shit" (with 21 Savage and Young Thug)	2024	31	13	12	—	29	—	—	—	—	44		American Dream
"Dangerous" (with 21 Savage and Lil Durk)	2024	35	15	14	—	31	—	—	—	—	50	RIAA: Gold	American Dream
"Just Like Me" (with 21 Savage and Burna Boy)	2024	67	28	25	—	49	—	—	—	—	93		American Dream
"We Don't Trust You" (with Future)	2024	8	5	5	—	15	—	―	— (Note: "We Don't Trust You" did not enter the NZ Top 40 Singles Chart, but peaked at number eight on the NZ Hot Singles Chart.)	— (Note: "We Don't Trust You" did not enter the UK Singles Chart, as chart rules only allow three songs per artist to chart within the top one hundred at a time, but peaked at number 42 on the UK Streaming Chart.)	11		We Don't Trust You
"Ice Attack" (with Future)	2024	13	8	8	56	25	195	—	—	— (Note: "Ice Attack" did not enter the UK Singles Chart, as chart rules only allow three songs per artist to chart within the top one hundred at a time, but peaked at number 99 on the UK Streaming Chart.)	20		We Don't Trust You
"Claustrophobic" (with Future)	2024	24	12	11	—	42	—	—	—	—	35		We Don't Trust You
"Slimed In" (with Future)	2024	20	10	9	—	36	—	—	—	—	31		We Don't Trust You
"Magic Don Juan (Princess Diana)" (with Future)	2024	27	14	12	—	46	—	—	—	—	38		We Don't Trust You
"Cinderella" (with Future and Travis Scott)	2024	6	3	3	40	11	103	29	28	20	8	MC: Platinum	We Don't Trust You
"Runnin Outta Time" (with Future)	2024	36	22	18	—	45	—	—	—	—	52		We Don't Trust You
"Fried (She a Vibe)" (with Future)	2024	33	20	17	—	47	—	—	—	—	59		We Don't Trust You
"Ain't No Love" (with Future)	2024	41	25	21	—	58	—	—	—	—	85		We Don't Trust You
"Everyday Hustle" (with Future and Rick Ross)	2024	38	23	19	—	51	—	—	—	—	62		We Don't Trust You
"GTA" (with Future)	2024	40	24	20	—	61	—	—	—	—	83		We Don't Trust You
"Seen It All" (with Future)	2024	54	29	25	—	74	—	—	—	—	124		We Don't Trust You
"WTFYM" (with Future)	2024	52	28	24	—	65	—	—	—	—	117		We Don't Trust You
"Where My Twin @" (with Future)	2024	62	30	—	—	85	—	—	—	—	167		We Don't Trust You
"Drink n Dance" (with Future)	2024	51	19	16	—	67	—	—	—	—	118		We Still Don't Trust You
"Out of My Hands" (with Future)	2024	41	17	14	—	64	—	—	— (Note: "Out of My Hands" did not enter the NZ Top 40 Singles Chart, but peaked at number 12 on the NZ Hot Singles Chart.)	—	96		We Still Don't Trust You
"Jealous" (with Future)	2024	54	21	18	—	89	—	—	—	—	149		We Still Don't Trust You
"This Sunday" (with Future)	2024	77	33	—	—	—	—	—	—	—	—		We Still Don't Trust You
"Luv Bad Bitches" (with Future and Brownstone)	2024	73	32	—	—	—	—	—	—	—	—		We Still Don't Trust You
"Amazing" (Interlude) (with Future)	2024	— (Note: "Amazing" (Interlude) did not enter the Billboard Hot 100, but peaked at number one on the Bubbling Under Hot 100 chart.)	46	—	—	—	—	—	—	—	—		We Still Don't Trust You
"All to Myself" (with Future and the Weeknd)	2024	67	28	25	—	90	—	—	—	—	176		We Still Don't Trust You
"Nights Like This" (with Future)	2024	81	36	—	—	—	—	—	—	—	—		We Still Don't Trust You
"Came to the Party" (with Future)	2024	99	43	—	—	—	—	—	—	—	—		We Still Don't Trust You
"Right 4 You" (with Future)	2024	— (Note: "Right 4 You" did not enter the Billboard Hot 100, but peaked at number 13 on the Bubbling Under Hot 100 chart.)	—	—	—	—	—	—	—	—	—		We Still Don't Trust You
"Mile High Memories" (with Future)	2024	— (Note: "Mile High Memories" did not enter the Billboard Hot 100, but peaked at number 12 on the Bubbling Under Hot 100 chart.)	—	—	—	—	—	—	—	—	—		We Still Don't Trust You
"Overload" (with Future)	2024	— (Note: "Overload" did not enter the Billboard Hot 100, but peaked at number 20 on the Bubbling Under Hot 100 chart.)	—	—	—	—	—	—	—	—	—		We Still Don't Trust You
"Gracious" (with Future and Ty Dolla Sign)	2024	— (Note: "Gracious" did not enter the Billboard Hot 100, but peaked at number 23 on the Bubbling Under Hot 100 chart.)	—	—	—	—	—	—	—	—	—		We Still Don't Trust You
"Beat It" (with Future)	2024	— (Note: "Beat It" did not enter the Billboard Hot 100, but peaked at number four on the Bubbling Under Hot 100 chart.)	48	—	—	—	—	—	—	—	—		We Still Don't Trust You
"Always Be My Fault" (with Future and the Weeknd)	2024	— (Note: "Always Be My Fault" did not enter the Billboard Hot 100, but peaked at number 22 on the Bubbling Under Hot 100 chart.)	—	—	—	—	—	—	—	—	—		We Still Don't Trust You
"One Big Family" (with Future)	2024	— (Note: "One Big Family" did not enter the Billboard Hot 100, but peaked at number 25 on the Bubbling Under Hot 100 chart.)	—	—	—	—	—	—	—	—	—		We Still Don't Trust You
"Red Leather" (with Future and J. Cole)	2024	39	16	13	—	58	—	—	— (Note: "Red Leather" did not enter the NZ Top 40 Singles Chart, but peaked at number nine on the NZ Hot Singles Chart.)	—	97		We Still Don't Trust You
"Nobody Knows My Struggle" (with Future)	2024	100	44	—	—	—	—	—	—	—	—		We Still Don't Trust You
"All My Life" (with Future and Lil Baby)	2024	61	25	22	—	83	—	—	—	—	187		We Still Don't Trust You
"Crossed Out" (with Future)	2024	— (Note: "Crossed Out" did not enter the Billboard Hot 100, but peaked at number five on the Bubbling Under Hot 100 chart.)	49	—	—	—	—	—	—	—	—		We Still Don't Trust You
"Crazy Clientele" (with Future)	2024	— (Note: "Crazy Clientele" did not enter the Billboard Hot 100, but peaked at number two on the Bubbling Under Hot 100 chart.)	47	—	—	—	—	—	—	—	—		We Still Don't Trust You
"Show of Hands" (with Future and ASAP Rocky)	2024	71	30	—	—	71	—	—	— (Note: "Show of Hands" did not enter the NZ Top 40 Singles Chart, but peaked at number 10 on the NZ Hot Singles Chart.)	—	189		We Still Don't Trust You
"Streets Made Me a King" (with Future)	2024	95	41	—	—	—	—	—	—	—	—		We Still Don't Trust You
"Purple Rain" (Don Toliver featuring Future and Metro Boomin)	2024	— (Note: "Purple Rain" did not enter the Billboard Hot 100, but peaked at number nine on the Bubbling Under Hot 100 Singles chart.)	34	—	—	—	—	—	—	—	—		Hardstone Psycho
"They Wanna Have Fun" (with Travis Porter, Young Dro and Gucci Mane)	2025	—	42	—	—	—	—	—	—	—	—		A Futuristic Summa
"—" denotes a recording that did not chart or was not released in that territory.

== Guest appearances ==
List of non-single guest appearances, with other performing artists, showing year released and album name
Title	Year	Other artist(s)	Album
"Jack Tripper"	2014	Low Pros, A-Trak, Lex Luger, Young Thug, Peewee Longway	EP 1
"Muscle"	2014	Low Pros, A-Trak, Lex Luger, Juvenile, High Klassified	EP 1
"School"	2015	Pretty Tony	Tony In My City
"Free Throw"	2015	Gio Dee, MadeinTYO	MYB (Mind Yo Business)
"Aint Going Broke"	2016	Nephew100, Jose Guapoo	Trap B4 Rap the Re-Up
"Later"	2017	Philly Swain, J. Doe	The Parade, Vol. 1
"Omwtf"	2017	Dallas Vega	Nuk3
"Car Sick"	2018	Gunna, Nav	Drip Season 3
"Hunneds"	2018	Flight Club Cray, Nino	Geekmonster
"People Like Me"	2018	Boogottinyc, Chris Rivers	My Bag
"No Limit"	2018	Kidd Flare	Love Cries
"All for Me"	2018	Belly	Immigrant
"My House"	2018	Lil B, The Basedgod	Options
"Tell Them"	2019	James Blake, Moses Sumney	Assume Form
"Pop Ur Shit"	2024	21 Savage, Young Thug	American Dream
"Dangerous"	2024	21 Savage, Lil Durk	American Dream
"Just Like Me"	2024	21 Savage, Burna Boy	American Dream
"Purple Rain"	2024	Don Toliver, Future	Hardstone Psycho
