= Perfect Timing =

Perfect Timing may refer to:

== Albums ==
- Perfect Timing (Boo & Gotti album), 2003, or the title track
- Perfect Timing (Kiki Dee album), 1981
- Perfect Timing (McAuley Schenker Group album), 1987
- Perfect Timing (Nav and Metro Boomin mixtape), 2017
- Perfect Timing (Outlawz album), 2011, or the title track
- Perfect Timing, by Donna Allen, 1986

== Songs ==
- "Perfect Timing (Intro)", by Nav and Metro Boomin, 2017
- "Perfect Timing", by Jason Derulo from Tattoos, 2013
- "Perfect Timing", by Jeremih and Ty Dolla Sign from MihTy, 2018
- "Perfect Timing", by Lil Baby from It's Only Me, 2022
- "Perfect Timing", by Shedeur Sanders, 2024

== See also ==
- Perfect Time, an album by Moya Brennan, 1998
- "Perfect Time", a song by Ride from Play, 1990
- "Perfect Time", a song by Roddy Ricch from Please Excuse Me for Being Antisocial, 2019
