= Dead People =

Dead People may refer to:

- Dead body
- Death
- Ghost
- Category:Dead people
- "Dead People", song by 21 Savage from Issa Album 2017
- Messiah of Evil, a 1973 film, also released as Dead People
