= My Dawg =

My Dawg may refer to:

- My Dawg (Lil Baby song), 2017
- My Dawg (21 Savage and Metro Boomin song), 2020
- "My Dawg", a song by Nav, from the album Demons Protected by Angels
