= Call Me (Nav and Metro Boomin song) =

2017 single by Nav and Metro Boomin

Single by Nav and Metro Boomin

from the album Perfect Timing
- Released: July 14, 2017
- Length: 3:35
- Label: XO; Republic
- Songwriters: Navraj Goraya; Leland Wayne; Amir Esmailian
- Producer: Metro Boomin

Nav singles chronology
| "Myself" (2017) | "Call Me" / "Perfect Timing (Intro)" (2017) | "Wanted You" (2017) |

Metro Boomin singles chronology
| "No Complaints" (2017) | "Call Me" / "Perfect Timing (Intro)" (2017) | "Ric Flair Drip" (2017) |

Music video
- "Call Me" on YouTube

"Call Me" is a song by Canadian rapper Nav and American record producer Metro Boomin. It is one of the dual singles from their collaborative mixtape Perfect Timing. The song was released for digital download on July 14, 2017 with the lead single, the title track of the mixtape.

== Music video ==
The music video for "Call Me" was released on August 18, 2017 on Nav's Vevo account and was directed by RJ Sanchez. The video was shot in Magic City Club in Atlanta. Nav and Metro Boomin are seen showing off Ferrari Portofino in the music video. As of May 2021, the video has surpassed over 60 million views.

== Track listing ==
Digital download
| No. | Title | Length |
|---|---|---|
| 1. | "Call Me" | 3:35 |

== Charts ==
=== Weekly charts ===
| Chart (2017) | Peak position |
|---|---|
| Canada Hot 100 (Billboard) | 65 |
| US Bubbling Under Hot 100 (Billboard) | 25 |
| US Bubbling Under R&B/Hip-Hop Singles (Billboard) | 3 |

== Certifications ==
| Region | Certification | Certified units/sales |
|---|---|---|
| Canada (Music Canada) | 2× Platinum | 160,000^{‡} |
| United States (RIAA) | Platinum | 1,000,000^{‡} |
^{‡} Sales+streaming figures based on certification alone.

== Release history ==
| Region | Date | Format | Label(s) | Ref. |
|---|---|---|---|---|
| Various | July 14, 2017 (Note: Release as a single.) | Digital download | XO; Republic | |
