= Space Cadet (song) =

2019 single by Metro Boomin featuring Gunna

Single by Metro Boomin featuring Gunna

from the album Not All Heroes Wear Capes
- Released: January 29, 2019
- Genre: Trap
- Length: 3:23
- Label: Boominati; Republic
- Songwriters: Leland Wayne; Sergio Kitchens; Wesley Glass; Allen Ritter
- Producers: Metro Boomin; Wheezy

Metro Boomin singles chronology
"Mile High" (2019)	"Space Cadet" (2019)	"Go Viral" (2019)

Gunna singles chronology
"All This Muny" (2018)	"Space Cadet" (2019)	"One Call" (2019)

Music video
- "Space Cadet" on YouTube

"Space Cadet" is a song by American record producer Metro Boomin featuring American rapper Gunna. It was sent to rhythmic contemporary radio through Boominati and Republic on January 29, 2019, as the fifth and final single of Metro's debut studio album, Not All Heroes Wear Capes (2018).

== Background ==
"Space Cadet" is primarily produced by Metro Boomin and Wheezy, with Allen Ritter as an additional producer. Meanwhile, the vocals are handled by Gunna, with background vocals at the end from fellow American rapper and singer Travis Scott, a close friend and frequent collaborator of both Metro and Gunna, who also appears on five other album tracks: "Overdue", "Dreamcatcher", "Up to Something", "Only 1 (Interlude)", and "No More" On the song, Gunna raps about his lavish lifestyle. It is mostly a reference to the Rolls-Royce Wraith, an expensive car that is known for its starry ceiling. A space cadet is a trainee astronaut.

It marks the second official collaboration between Metro and Gunna, following Gunna's 2018 song "Car Sick", which also features Canadian rapper Nav, who is a close friend and frequent collaborator of both artists. The song is from Gunna's commercial mixtape, Drip Season 3, to which Metro served as an executive producer on and also produced four other songs from the project, "Helluva Price", "Pedestrian", "My Soul", and "No Joke". Gunna also makes another appearance on the album alongside fellow American rapper and label boss Young Thug on the song "Lesbian".

== Critical reception ==
While talking about "Space Cadet", Alphonse Pierre from Pitchfork opined:

On "Space Cadet", Metro ushers Gunna into "The Twilight Zone" with a twinkling instrumental, and Gunna responds with one of the album's bounciest hooks. The "Space Cadet" instrumental, like so much of the album's production, feels cinematic but thankfully not far removed from his Atlanta-built sound.

== Chart performance ==
"Space Cadet" debuted and peaked at number 51 on the US Billboard Hot 100 chart, on the week of November 17, 2018. The single also debuted at number 22 on the US Hot R&B/Hip-Hop Songs chart. On November 7, 2023, the song was certified four-times platinum by the Recording Industry Association of America (RIAA) for combined sales and streaming equivalent units of over four million units in the United States.

== Music video ==
The official music video for "Space Cadet" premiered on April 22, 2019. It was directed by Zac Facts. Metro Boomin and Gunna are dancing and floating around in lasers and bright lights, like a simulation of outer space. Young Thug, a close friend and frequent collaborator of both artists, makes a cameo appearance.

== Live performances ==
On February 11, 2019, Metro Boomin and Gunna performed the song live on The Tonight Show Starring Jimmy Fallon. In tribute of American rapper 21 Savage, a longtime close friend and frequent collaborator of Metro, the latter wore a jacket with the words "Free 21 Savage". The rapper was in jail at the time of the performance for illegally being in the United States of America, but was released the following day.

== Charts ==
Chart (2018)	Peak position
Canada Hot 100 (Billboard)	40
US Billboard Hot 100	51
US Hot R&B/Hip-Hop Songs (Billboard)	31

== Certifications ==
Region	Certification	Certified units/sales
Australia (ARIA)	2× Platinum	140,000^{‡}
Brazil (Pro-Música Brasil)	2× Platinum	80,000^{‡}
Canada (Music Canada)	5× Platinum	400,000^{‡}
Denmark (IFPI Danmark)	Gold	45,000^{‡}
France (SNEP)	Platinum	200,000^{‡}
Italy (FIMI)	Gold	50,000^{‡}
New Zealand (RMNZ)	2× Platinum	60,000^{‡}
Poland (ZPAV)	Platinum	50,000^{‡}
Portugal (AFP)	Gold	5,000^{‡}
United Kingdom (BPI)	Gold	400,000^{‡}
United States (RIAA)	4× Platinum	4,000,000^{‡}
^{‡} Sales+streaming figures based on certification alone.

== Release history ==
Country	Date	Format	Label	Ref.
Various	November 2, 2018	Digital download; streaming	Boominati; Republic	
United States	January 29, 2019	Rhythmic contemporary radio	Boominati; Republic	
