= Ric Flair Drip =

2017 single by Offset and Metro Boomin

Single by Offset and Metro Boomin

from the album Without Warning
- Released: October 31, 2017
- Recorded: 2017
- Studio: Sterling Sound, New York City
- Genre: Trap; hyphy
- Length: 2:52
- Label: Slaughter Gang; Epic; Quality Control; Motown; Capitol; Boominati; Republic
- Songwriters: Kiari Cephus; Leland Wayne; Bijan Amirkhani
- Producers: Metro Boomin; Bijan Amir

Offset singles chronology
"No Flag" (2017)	"Ric Flair Drip" (2017)	"Patek Water" (2017)

Metro Boomin singles chronology
"Perfect Timing (Intro)" / "Call Me" (2017)	"Ric Flair Drip" (2017)	"Pull Up N Wreck" (2018)

Music video
- "Ric Flair Drip" on YouTube

"Ric Flair Drip" is a song by American rapper Offset and American record producer Metro Boomin. It was included on their collaborative studio album with 21 Savage, Without Warning (2017). Upon the album's release, it charted at number 71 on the Billboard Hot 100. After its release as the lead single, on March 1, 2018, and a subsequent music video starring Ric Flair himself, it rose to number 13, becoming both Metro Boomin and Offset's highest-charting song as lead artists at the time, until the release of Metro's "Like That", which would peak at number 1. It is prominently featured in the WWE 2K19 soundtrack, particularly in the "Ric Flair Collector's Edition" version of the game. The song has amassed over 1.2 billion streams on Spotify, making it the 271st most played song ever on the streaming service. It is also the second most streamed song of all time on Spotify's influential RapCaviar playlist. The song has been credited for popularizing the term "drip", a slang expression denoting one's fashionability and excess swagger.

== Background ==
The song is the third track on 21 Savage, Offset and Metro Boomin's collaborative studio album Without Warning, which was released in October 2017. It was ranked the 44th best song of 2017 by Complex Media. It was the 10th most streamed track of 2018 on Apple Music.

On February 4, 2018, the track was certified platinum before even being released as a single, marking Offset's first platinum song as a lead artist. Almost half a year after its initial release, the song peaked at number 13 on the Billboard Hot 100, following months of gradual ascension from its number 71 debut. The song ultimately spent 31 total weeks on the Hot 100, and was ranked number 38th on Billboard's annual year end chart for 2018. It has since been certified 6× platinum by the RIAA, and is both the best-selling, and highest-charting song from any solo Migos member as a lead artist.

The single also achieved international success, receiving domestic platinum certifications in the United Kingdom, Australia, Canada and Greece, where it remained on the Greek charts for over 75 weeks.

== Music video and legacy ==
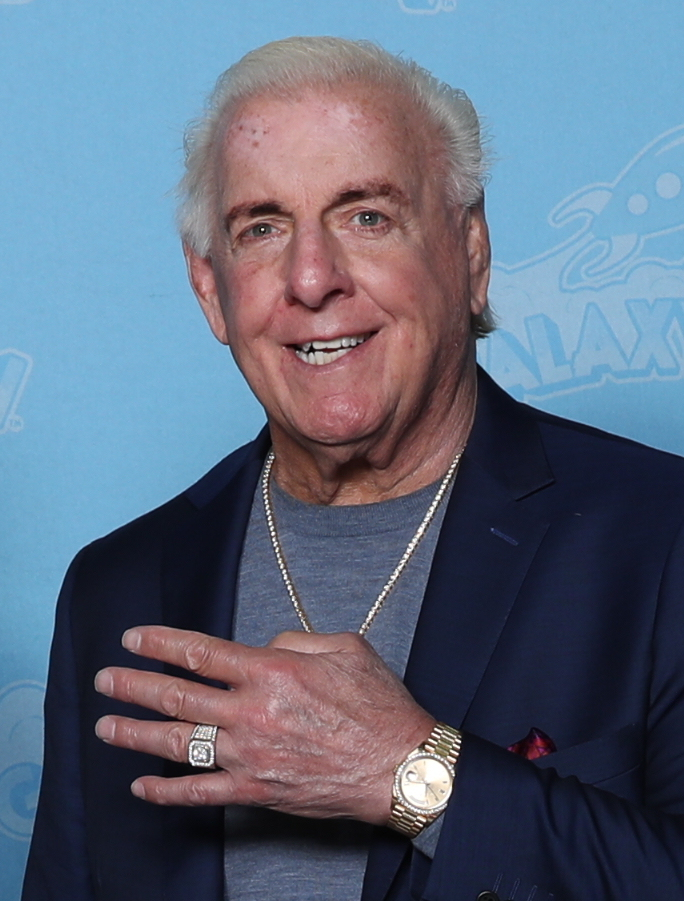
Song namesake Ric Flair (pictured in 2019) stars in the music video.

In late February 2018, Ric Flair posted a photo to his personal Twitter account of himself and Offset in sequin robes reminiscent of those famously worn by Flair during his WWE career, suggesting that a music video was in the works. A music video was released a week later on March 1, and was directed by Bengali-American director Shomi Patwary. It was published on 21 Savage's official Vevo channel.

The visual primarily takes place in a luxury mansion and features appearances from song namesake Ric Flair, fellow Migos members Quavo and Takeoff as well as album-mates, 21 Savage and Metro Boomin. Patwary described the video's flagrant portrayal of opulence as a parody of the "outlandish" nature of many contemporary hip-hop music videos. The audio cuts midway for an interlude in which Flair delivers his signature "Limousine-Ridin', Jet-Flyin' Son of a Gun" WWE monologue. Throughout the video, Offset can be seen wearing a chain based on Ric Flair's likeness. The $70,000 medallion was originally gifted to Offset by Quality Control Music CEO Pierre "Pee" Thomas for his 26th birthday, and was approved by Ric Flair himself.

The music video was watched more than 1.5 million times on YouTube within the first 24 hours of its premiere, and as of April 2022, it has exceeded 422 million views. XXL included it on their year-end list of the 50 best music videos of 2018. Its "official audio" was uploaded to YouTube on October 31, 2017, to accompany the release of its parent album and has itself alone garnered over 140 million views.

Ric Flair selected the song for the WWE 2K19 soundtrack, and has used the track as his personal ringtone, as well as entrance music for his own wedding. Various "Ric Flair Drip"-inspired t-shirts and sweatshirts depicting lyrics were also made available for purchase on Ric Flair's official online merchandise shop.

The video has spawned an unlikely friendship between Offset and Flair, as the two have made multiple public appearances together since its release and routinely interact on social media. In April 2018, the visual was recreated live on The Tonight Show Starring Jimmy Fallon in a performance that featured a surprise appearance from Flair himself. The two also made a joint appearance on an episode of WWE SmackDown in September 2019.

== Remix ==
On January 17, 2018, American rapper Tyga released his remix of the song titled "Dubai Drip", which he released on the WorldStarHipHop YouTube channel.

== Personnel ==
Credits and personnel adapted from Tidal.

Musicians

- Leland Wayne – production, composer, songwriter
- Kiari Cephus – lead artist, songwriter, composer

Technical

- Bijan Amir – production, composer, programmer
- Joe LaPorta – master engineering
- Ethan Stevens – engineering, mixing

== Charts ==
=== Weekly charts ===
Chart (2017–2018)	Peak position
Australia (ARIA)	61
Canada Hot 100 (Billboard)	13
Ireland (IRMA)	75
Latvia (DigiTop100)	46
Sweden (Sverigetopplistan)	89
Switzerland (Schweizer Hitparade)	74
UK Singles (OCC)	67
US Billboard Hot 100	13
US Hot R&B/Hip-Hop Songs (Billboard)	9
US Rhythmic Airplay (Billboard)	8

=== Year-end charts ===
Chart (2018)	Position
Canada (Canadian Hot 100)	49
Portugal (AFP)	194
US Billboard Hot 100	38
US Hot R&B/Hip-Hop Songs (Billboard)	31
US Rhythmic (Billboard)	39

== Certifications ==
Region	Certification	Certified units/sales
Australia (ARIA)	Platinum	70,000^{‡}
Canada (Music Canada)	4× Platinum	320,000^{‡}
Denmark (IFPI Danmark)	2× Platinum	180,000^{‡}
France (SNEP)	Platinum	200,000^{‡}
Germany (BVMI)	Gold	200,000^{‡}
Italy (FIMI)	Platinum	100,000^{‡}
New Zealand (RMNZ)	5× Platinum	150,000^{‡}
Poland (ZPAV)	Platinum	50,000^{‡}
Spain (Promusicae)	Gold	30,000^{‡}
United Kingdom (BPI)	Platinum	600,000^{‡}
United States (RIAA)	6× Platinum	6,000,000^{‡}
Streaming
Greece (IFPI Greece)	4× Platinum	8,000,000^{†}
^{‡} Sales+streaming figures based on certification alone.^{†} Streaming-only figures based on certification alone.

== Release history ==
Region	Date	Format	Label	Ref.
Various	October 31, 2017	Digital download; streaming	Epic; QC; Motown; Capitol; Republic; Slaughter Gang; Boominati	
United States	March 1, 2018	Rhythmic contemporary	Republic	
