= Issa Album =

Studio album by 21 Savage
- Released: July 7, 2017
- Genres: Hip-hop; trap
- Length: 56:30
- Labels: Slaughter Gang; Epic
- Producers: 21 Savage; Cubeatz; DJ Mustard; Metro Boomin; Pi'erre Bourne; Southside; Twice as Nice; Wheezy; Zaytoven

21 Savage chronology
Savage Mode (2016)	Issa Album (2017)	Without Warning (2017)

Singles from Issa Album
- 1. "Bank Account" Released: August 8, 2017

Issa Album is the debut studio album by rapper 21 Savage. It was released on July 7, 2017, through Slaughter Gang Entertainment and distributed by Epic Records. The album features production from frequent collaborator Metro Boomin, alongside Southside, Pi'erre Bourne, Zaytoven, Wheezy, DJ Mustard and 21 Savage himself. It succeeds 21 Savage's collaborative EP with Metro Boomin, Savage Mode (2016).

Issa Album was supported by the lead single, "Bank Account". The album charted at number two on the US Billboard 200, and received generally positive reviews from critics.

== Background ==
On February 9, 2017, 21 Savage announced the title of the album. On June 29, 21 Savage revealed the album's cover art, along with the release date. On July 2, 2017, 21 Savage confirmed the album's producers.

== Promotion ==
"Issa" featuring Young Thug and Drake, was a planned single to be released on Savage's album. On December 19, 2016, Young Thug posted a video confirming that he will collaborate with 21 Savage on his debut studio album. However, in May 2017, the original track was leaked online and made many fans unaware of the song being on the album. It has also been confirmed that 21 Savage scrapped the song from his studio album.

=== Singles ===
The album's lead single, "Bank Account", was released to rhythmic contemporary radio on August 8, 2017. The song peaked at number 12 on the US Billboard Hot 100.

== Critical reception ==
Professional ratings
Aggregate scores
Source	Rating
AnyDecentMusic?	6.5/10
Metacritic	70/100
Review scores
Source	Rating
AllMusic	3/5 stars
Consequence	C+
Exclaim!	8/10
Gig Soup	73%
HipHopDX	3.3/5
HotNewHipHop	72%
Pitchfork	6.5/10
RapReviews	6.5/10
Tiny Mix Tapes	4/5
XXL	4/5

Issa Album was met with generally positive reviews. At Metacritic, which assigns a normalized rating out of 100 to reviews from mainstream publications, the album received an average score of 70, based on 10 reviews. Aggregator AnyDecentMusic? gave it 6.5 out of 10, based on their assessment of the critical consensus.

In XXL, Scott Glaysher opined that the artist "manages to craft a fairly concise project with Issa Album about all the things that make him such a compelling rapper in today's hip-hop landscape". Exclaim!'s M.T. Richards wrote that "Savage's strength of feeling against certain people cannot be overstated". Corrigan B of Tiny Mix Tapes noted, "Despite expectations, it's an utter joy to listen to—a simple display of what 21 Savage sounds like when he's having fun rapping". Jon Caramanica of The New York Times wrote positively, "Issa Album contains some of 21 Savage's best and most fully realized songs to date—especially "Bank Account" and "Bad Business"". Justin Ivey of HipHopDX stated, "The budding star easily could have played it safe and stuck to a winning formula, which remains a strong suit (i.e. Issa's "Bank Account" and "Close My Eyes"). Instead, he challenged himself to be more musically ambitious. While his experiments didn't produce dynamic results, the positives overshadow the negatives".

Steve "Flash" Juon of RapReviews said, "For better or worse the album also achieves a certain bland uniformity at times by staying so true to the trap aesthetic and having Metro Boomin produce so much of the music. It's not ill-conceived, it's just that it all winds up becoming a bit monotonous if you don't randomize it and/or mix in some songs by other artists". Sheldon Pearce of Pitchfork states, "He is so compelling when he digs deeper into his psyche this way, providing more than superficiality, but there aren't enough of these moments to sustain Issa Album, which is as basic as its title". In a mixed review, AllMusic's Neil Z. Yeung stated: "Overall, Issa is a competent statement that demonstrates promise from the young rapper." Brian Josephs of Spin said, "Issa Album needn't be The Infamous, but it could've benefitted from a clearer and tighter direction". Wren Graves of Consequence criticized the "repetitive odes to getting high, getting laid, and getting lots of money".

== Commercial performance ==
Issa Album debuted at number two on the US Billboard 200 with 77,000 album-equivalent units, of which 22,000 were pure album sales. On November 24, 2020, the album was certified platinum by the Recording Industry Association of America (RIAA) for combined sales, streaming and track-sales equivalent of one million units in the United States.

== Track listing ==
Issa Album track listing
No.	Title	Writer(s)	Producer(s)	Length
1.	"Famous"	Shayaa Abraham-Joseph; Leland Wayne; Xavier Dotson	Metro Boomin; Zaytoven^{[b]}	3:54
2.	"Bank Account"	Abraham-Joseph; Wayne; Coleridge-Taylor Perkinson	21 Savage; Metro Boomin^{[a]}	3:40
3.	"Close My Eyes"	Abraham-Joseph; Wayne	Metro Boomin	4:52
4.	"Bad Business"	Abraham-Joseph; Joshua Luellen	Southside; Jake One^{[b]}; Sam Wish^{[b]}	2:42
5.	"Baby Girl"	Abraham-Joseph; Jordan Jenks	Pi'erre Bourne	2:49
6.	"Thug Life"	Abraham-Joseph; Wayne; Curtis Mayfield	Metro Boomin	4:23
7.	"FaceTime"	Abraham-Joseph; Dijon McFarlane; Te Whiti Warbrick; Nicholas Audino; Lewis Hughes	DJ Mustard; Twice as Nice^{[a]}	3:59
8.	"Nothin New"	Abraham-Joseph; Wayne; Dotson	Metro Boomin; Zaytoven	3:39
9.	"Numb"	Abraham-Joseph; Wayne	Metro Boomin	4:31
10.	"Dead People"	Abraham-Joseph; Luellen	Southside; Jake One^{[b]}	2:27
11.	"Money Convo"	Abraham-Joseph; Wayne	Metro Boomin	3:33
12.	"Special"	Abraham-Joseph; Wesley Glass	Wheezy	3:37
13.	"Whole Lot"	Abraham-Joseph; Wayne; Jeffery Williams	Metro Boomin; Cubeatz^{[b]}	5:13
14.	"7 Min Freestyle"	Abraham-Joseph; Wayne; Luellen	Metro Boomin; Southside^{[b]}	7:11
Total length:				56:30

Notes

- ^{^[a]} signifies a co-producer
- ^{^[b]} signifies an uncredited co-producer

Sample credits

- "Bank Account" contains a sample of Coleridge-Taylor Perkinson's original composition "Flashbulbs".
- "Thug Life" contains a sample of "Something He Can Feel", written by Curtis Mayfield and performed by En Vogue.

== Personnel ==
Credits adapted from Tidal and XXL.

Performers

- 21 Savage – primary artist
- Young Thug – vocals (track 13)

Technical

- Alex Tumay – mixing (all tracks)
- Gordie Tumay – assistant mixing (all tracks)
- Joe LaPorta – mastering (all tracks)
- Blake Harden – recording (all tracks)
- Derrick Selby – recording (all tracks)
- Ethan Stevens – recording (all tracks)
- Anthony Gonzales – recording (all tracks)
- Brian Smith – recording (all tracks)
- Todd Bergman – uncredited recording (track 7)

Production

- Metro Boomin – production (tracks 1, 3, 6, 8, 9, 11, 13, 14), co-production (track 2)
- Zaytoven – uncredited co-production (track 1), production (track 8)
- 21 Savage – production (track 2)
- Southside – production (tracks 4, 10), uncredited co-production (track 14)
- Jake One – co-production (tracks 4, 10)
- Sam Wish – co-production (track 4)
- Pi'erre Bourne – production (track 5)
- DJ Mustard – production (track 7)
- Twice as Nice – co-production (track 7)
- Wheezy – production (track 12)
- Cubeatz – uncredited co-production (track 13)

== Charts ==
=== Weekly charts ===
Chart performance for Issa Album
Chart (2017)	Peak position
Australian Albums (ARIA)	42
Belgian Albums (Ultratop Flanders)	56
Belgian Albums (Ultratop Wallonia)	195
Canadian Albums (Billboard)	8
Czech Albums (ČNS IFPI)	74
Danish Albums (Hitlisten)	29
Dutch Albums (Album Top 100)	22
Finnish Albums (Suomen virallinen lista)	23
French Albums (SNEP)	106
Italian Albums (FIMI)	76
Latvian Albums (LaIPA)	21
New Zealand Albums (RMNZ)	27
Norwegian Albums (VG-lista)	22
Slovak Albums (ČNS IFPI)	40
Swedish Albums (Sverigetopplistan)	37
UK Albums (Official Charts)	42
US Billboard 200	2
US Top R&B/Hip-Hop Albums (Billboard)	2

=== Year-end charts ===
2017 year-end chart performance for Issa Album
Chart (2017)	Position
US Billboard 200	55
US Top R&B/Hip-Hop Albums (Billboard)	24

2018 year-end chart performance for Issa Album
Chart (2018)	Position
US Billboard 200	141
US Top R&B/Hip-Hop Albums (Billboard)	70

== Certifications ==
Certifications for Issa Album
Region	Certification	Certified units/sales
Canada (Music Canada)	Platinum	80,000^{‡}
Denmark (IFPI Danmark)	Gold	10,000^{‡}
New Zealand (RMNZ)	Gold	7,500^{‡}
United States (RIAA)	Platinum	1,000,000^{‡}
^{‡} Sales+streaming figures based on certification alone.
