= Not All Heroes Wear Capes =

Studio album by Metro Boomin
- Released: November 2, 2018
- Recorded: 2015–2018
- Genre: Trap
- Length: 43:50 (standard edition); 87:20 (deluxe edition)
- Label: Boominati; Republic
- Producer: Metro Boomin; Allen Ritter; Chopsquad DJ; Dre Moon; Milan Beker; Prince 85; Southside; Tay Keith; Wheezy

Metro Boomin chronology
Double or Nothing (2017)	Not All Heroes Wear Capes (2018)	Savage Mode II (2020)

Singles from Not All Heroes Wear Capes
- 1. "No Complaints" Released: June 23, 2017; 2. "Space Cadet" Released: January 29, 2019

Not All Heroes Wear Capes (stylized in all caps) is the debut solo studio album by American record producer Metro Boomin. It was released by Boominati Worldwide and Republic Records on November 2, 2018. The album features guest appearances from Gucci Mane, Travis Scott, 21 Savage, Swae Lee, Gunna, Young Thug, Wizkid, J Balvin, Offset, Kodak Black, and Drake. The deluxe edition of the album was released, consisting of the instrumental versions of all songs from the standard edition on November 6, 2018. The album is the first part of a trilogy, with the second part being its sequel, Metro's second studio album, Heroes & Villains, which was released on December 2, 2022.

== Release and promotion ==
On June 23, 2017, Metro released the lead single of the album, "No Complaints", which features American rapper Offset and Canadian rapper Drake. On October 26, 2018, multiple billboards appeared in Atlanta and New York depicting Metro Boomin as a "missing person". It was later revealed to be a teaser for the new full-length project Not All Heroes Wear Capes, cryptically teased as a solo album. The cover and track list were unveiled by 21 Savage on his Instagram page. It was then announced on October 31, 2018. On January 29, 2019, "Space Cadet", which features American rapper Gunna, was released to rhythmic contemporary radio on January 29, 2019, as the album's second single.

== Critical reception ==
Professional ratings
Aggregate scores
Source	Rating
Metacritic	78/100
Review scores
Source	Rating
AllMusic	3.5/5 stars
Highsnobiety	4.0/5
HipHopDX	4.0/5
HotNewHipHop	80%
Pitchfork	7.7/10

Not All Heroes Wear Capes received positive reviews from music critics. Alphonse Pierre of Pitchfork described Not All Heroes Wear Capes as "a high-profile guest-filled album that builds on and creates a bigger version of the dark, hard-hitting production that has turned Metro into rap’s definitive producer of the last five years." Pierre praised the production and performances of the featured artists, concluding that the album "doesn’t feel like the typical producer album, filled with mixtape leftovers and owed favors. This is Metro Boomin laying the groundwork for his next phase, which at times feels like it could be film scores. When you’ve done it all at 25 years old, some may lose the motivation, but Metro seems ready to keep going, continuing to define the new sound of hip-hop." Marcus Blackwell of HipHopDX complimented the cohesiveness of the album, adding that there is "a cinematic feel throughout that places the artists in their appropriate pockets." Online hip hop publication HotNewHipHop concluded: "With the power to transcend his post-trap aesthetic in full-display, Metro Boomin is gearing up for the most arduous creative phase of his career. NAHWC is a memorable showcase if you wade through the more tenable parts and create your own setlist. For Metro Boomin the distance between the 1st rung he currently occupies, and the rest of the ladder is so cavernous, he surely has all the time in the World to find his autonomy." Thomas Hobbs from Highsnobiety describes Metro Boomin's work in Not All Heroes Wear Capes as a feeling "both minimalist and maximalist at the same time, with Metro creating vast compositions out of what feels like fairly traditional rap production techniques", with praises to the album as "consistently engaging".

== Commercial performance ==
Not All Heroes Wear Capes debuted at number one on the US Billboard 200 with 99,000 album-equivalent units, making it Metro Boomin's first US number-one album. The album dropped to the number eight in its second week, earning an additional 52,000 album-equivalent units. The album debuted at 16 on the UK Album Charts.

Following the release of Not All Heroes Wear Capes, seven songs from the album debuted on the Billboard Hot 100, including the 21 Savage-assisted track "Don't Come Out the House", which charted at number 38, becoming the highest-charting song from the album.

== Track listing ==
No.	Title	Writer(s)	Producer(s)	Length
1.	"10AM / Save the World" (featuring Gucci Mane)	Leland Wayne; Radric Davis; Andre Proctor; Joseph Froese; Gladys Givens	Metro Boomin; Dre Moon; Prince 85	3:46
2.	"Overdue" (featuring Travis Scott)	Wayne; Jacques Webster II; Hannah Robinson; Annie Strand; Richard Phillips	Metro Boomin; Milan Beker^{[a]}	2:46
3.	"Don't Come Out the House" (featuring 21 Savage)	Wayne; Shayaa Abraham-Joseph; Brytavious Chambers	Metro Boomin; Tay Keith	2:48
4.	"Dreamcatcher" (featuring Swae Lee and Travis Scott)	Wayne; Khalif Brown; Webster; Allen Ritter	Metro Boomin; Ritter	3:31
5.	"Space Cadet" (featuring Gunna)	Wayne; Sergio Kitchens; Wesley Glass; Ritter	Metro Boomin; Wheezy; Ritter^{[a]}	3:23
6.	"10 Freaky Girls" (featuring 21 Savage)	Wayne; Abraham-Joseph; Michael Jones	Metro Boomin	3:28
7.	"Up to Something" (featuring Travis Scott and Young Thug)	Wayne; Webster; Jeffery Williams; Ritter; Joshua Luellen	Metro Boomin; Ritter; Southside	3:04
8.	"Only 1 (Interlude)" (featuring Travis Scott)	Wayne; Webster	Metro Boomin	1:20
9.	"Lesbian" (featuring Gunna and Young Thug)	Wayne; Kitchens; Williams; Luellen	Metro Boomin; Southside	3:26
10.	"Borrowed Love" (featuring Swae Lee and Wizkid)	Wayne; Brown; Ayodeji Balogun; Mary Cross; Johnnie Frierson	Metro Boomin	3:50
11.	"Only You" (with J Balvin featuring Wizkid and Offset)	Wayne; Divine Ikubor; José Balvin; Balogun; Kiari Cephus; Ritter	Metro Boomin; Ritter	3:38
12.	"No More" (featuring Travis Scott, Kodak Black, and 21 Savage)	Wayne; Webster; Bill Kapri; Abraham-Joseph; Dale Warren	Metro Boomin	4:25
13.	"No Complaints" (featuring Offset and Drake) (bonus track)	Wayne; Cephus; Aubrey Graham	Metro Boomin	4:25
Total length:				43:50

Deluxe bonus disc
No.	Title	Length
1.	"10AM / Save the World" (instrumental)	3:46
2.	"Overdue" (instrumental)	2:46
3.	"Don't Come Out the House" (instrumental)	2:48
4.	"Dreamcatcher" (instrumental)	3:31
5.	"Space Cadet" (instrumental)	3:23
6.	"10 Freaky Girls" (instrumental)	3:28
7.	"Up to Something" (instrumental)	3:04
8.	"Only 1" (interlude; instrumental)	1:20
9.	"Lesbian" (instrumental)	3:26
10.	"Borrowed Love" (instrumental)	3:50
11.	"Only You" (instrumental)	3:38
12.	"No More" (instrumental)	4:05
13.	"No Complaints" (instrumental) (bonus track)	4:25
Total length:		43:30

Notes

- ^{^[a]} signifies an additional producer.
- "10AM / Save the World" features additional vocals by Kevin Lemons and Higher Calling.
- "Overdue" features additional vocals by 21 Savage.
- "Space Cadet" features additional vocals by Travis Scott.
- "Only You" features background vocals by Allen Ritter.
- "Overdue" transitions into "Don't Come Out the House".
- "Only 1 (Interlude)" transitions into "Lesbian".

Sample credits

- "10AM / Save the World" contains a sample from "Save the World", written by Gladys Givens and performed by The Loving Sisters.
- "Overdue" contains a sample from "Anthonio (Berlin Breakdown Version)", written by Annie Strand, Hannah Robinson, and Richard Phillips, and performed by Annie.
- "10 Freaky Girls" contains a sample from "Are You the Woman", written by Michael Jones and performed by Kashif and Whitney Houston.
- "Borrowed Love" contains a sample from "After Laughter (Comes Tears)", written by Mary Cross and Johnnie Frierson, and performed by Wendy Rene.
- "No More" contains a sample from "Synopsis One: In the Ghetto / God Save the World", written by Dale Warren and performed by 24-Carat Black.

== Personnel ==
Performance

- Metro Boomin – primary artist
- Gucci Mane – featured artist (track 1)
- Travis Scott – featured artist (tracks 2, 4, 7, 8, and 12), vocals (track 5)
- 21 Savage – featured artist (tracks 3, 6, and 12), additional vocals (track 2)
- Swae Lee – featured artist (tracks 4 and 10)
- Gunna – featured artist (tracks 5 and 9)
- Young Thug – featured artist (tracks 7 and 9)
- Wizkid – featured artist (tracks 10 and 11)
- Offset – featured artist (tracks 11 and 13)
- J Balvin – primary artist (track 11)
- Kodak Black – featured artist (track 12)
- Drake – featured artist (track 13)
- Kevin Lemons and Higher Calling – vocals (track 1)
- Allen Ritter – background vocals (track 11)

Instrumentation

- Jeff Basko – guitar (track 1)
- Peter Lee Johnson – strings (tracks 1, 8, and 9), keyboards (track 8)
- Milan Beker – keyboards (track 2)
- Allen Ritter – keyboards (track 5)
- Siraaj Rhett – horn (tracks 6 and 11)
- Jeff Babko – keyboards (track 9)
- Hudson Buckley – bass guitar (tracks 10 and 11)
- Mike McTaggart – guitar (tracks 10 and 11)
- Timothy Loo – conductor (track 10), strings conductor (track 10)
- Sean O'Neil – guitar (track 12)

Production

- Metro Boomin – executive production, production (all tracks)
- Dre Moon – production (track 1)
- Prince 85 – production (track 1)
- Tay Keith – production (track 3)
- Allen Ritter – production (tracks 4, 7, and 11), additional production (track 5)
- Wheezy – production (track 5)
- Milan Beker – additional production (track 2)
- Southside – production (tracks 7 and 9)

Technical

- Metro Boomin – programming (tracks 1, 3–12)
- Dre Moon – programming (track 1)
- Prince 85 – programming (track 1)
- Metro Boominati – programming (track 2)
- Tay Keith – programming (track 3)
- Allen Ritter – programming (tracks 4, 7, and 11)
- Wheezy – programming (track 5)
- Southside – programming (tracks 7 and 9)
- Ethan Stevens – mixing (all tracks), recording engineering (tracks 1–5, 7–12)
- Turnmeup Josh – recording engineering (track 6)
- Mac Attison – recording engineering (track 12)

== Charts ==
=== Weekly charts ===
Chart (2018)	Peak position
Australian Albums (ARIA)	18
Austrian Albums (Ö3 Austria)	30
Belgian Albums (Ultratop Flanders)	22
Belgian Albums (Ultratop Wallonia)	57
Canadian Albums (Billboard)	2
Danish Albums (Hitlisten)	5
Dutch Albums (Album Top 100)	8
Finnish Albums (Suomen virallinen lista)	16
German Albums (Offizielle Top 100)	59
Irish Albums (IRMA)	11
Italian Albums (FIMI)	26
Latvian Albums (LAIPA)	3
New Zealand Albums (RMNZ)	9
Norwegian Albums (VG-lista)	3
Swedish Albums (Sverigetopplistan)	11
Swiss Albums (Schweizer Hitparade)	26
UK Albums (OCC)	16
US Billboard 200	1
US Top R&B/Hip-Hop Albums (Billboard)	1

=== Year-end charts ===
Chart (2018)	Position
US Top R&B/Hip-Hop Albums (Billboard)	99

Chart (2019)	Position
Canadian Albums (Billboard)	46
US Billboard 200	47
US Top R&B/Hip-Hop Albums (Billboard)	36

== Certifications ==
Region	Certification	Certified units/sales
Australia (ARIA)	Gold	35,000^{‡}
Canada (Music Canada)	2× Platinum	160,000^{‡}
Denmark (IFPI Danmark)	Platinum	20,000^{‡}
France (SNEP)	Gold	50,000^{‡}
New Zealand (RMNZ)	Platinum	15,000^{‡}
Poland (ZPAV)	Gold	10,000^{‡}
United Kingdom (BPI)	Gold	100,000^{‡}
United States (RIAA)	Platinum	1,000,000^{‡}
^{‡} Sales+streaming figures based on certification alone.
