= Savage Mode II =

2020 album by 21 Savage and Metro Boomin

- Standard cover art for the album, chopped and screwed version features the same cover with a purple overlay

Studio album by 21 Savage and Metro Boomin
- Released: October 2, 2020
- Recorded: 2019–2020
- Studios: Astro (Atlanta); Circle House (Miami); Conway (Los Angeles); Paramount (Los Angeles); SugarHill (Houston); Wire Road (Houston)
- Genres: Hip-hop; trap
- Length: 44:01
- Labels: Slaughter Gang; Epic; Boominati; Republic
- Producers: David x Eli; Honorable C.N.O.T.E.; Kid Hazel; Metro Boomin; Prince 85; Southside; Zaytoven

21 Savage chronology
I Am > I Was (2018)	Savage Mode II (2020)	Spiral: From the Book of Saw Soundtrack (2021)

Metro Boomin chronology
Not All Heroes Wear Capes (2018)	Savage Mode II (2020)	Heroes & Villains (2022)

Limited edition vinyl cover

Singles from Savage Mode II
- 1. "Runnin" Released: October 13, 2020; 2. "Mr. Right Now" Released: October 13, 2020

Savage Mode II is a collaborative studio album by rapper 21 Savage and American record producer Metro Boomin. It was released on October 2, 2020, and was previewed through a trailer with narration by Morgan Freeman. The album serves as a sequel to the duo's extended play Savage Mode (2016). It features guest appearances by Drake, Young Thug, and Savage's cousin Young Nudy. On October 19, 2020, a chopped and screwed version of the album was released by OG Ron C and Slim K.

Savage Mode II received widespread acclaim and debuted atop the US Billboard 200, becoming 21 Savage and Metro Boomin's second US number-one album. It was supported by two singles: "Runnin" and "Mr. Right Now".

== Background ==
Metro Boomin first announced the project in July 2019, after 21 Savage brought him out on stage during a concert. Speaking to the crowd, Metro simply stated that Savage Mode II was on the way. On February 18, 2020, the producer tweeted a photo of himself and Savage in the studio. The caption for the picture read "MODE". On March 3, 21 Savage reposted a fan's Instagram story that the project would be released on March 13. In May, Savage stated that they were making sure the album is "perfect" before being released. The project's release was officially announced on September 28, with the duo confirmed the release date and previewing the album with a horror-themed, "macabre" trailer directed by Gibson Hazard, narrated by actor Morgan Freeman; he recorded his contributions onto his iPhone at his home. The visual contains in-studio scenes of the pair, as Freeman informs viewers of the meaning of "savage mode": "'Savage' is defined as 'fierce, beastly and untamed'. 'Mode' is defined as 'a way of operating or using the system'. So to be in 'savage mode' is to go hard, not allowing anything to stop or deter you from your mission. Basically, this means when someone is in 'savage mode', they're not to be fucked with". The announcement came a week after fans launched a petition urging Savage and Metro to release the album. It garnered over 28,000 signatures.

== Cover art ==
Metro Boomin unveiled the album cover on September 29 on his social media, with the caption: "Boominati Slaughter Gang taking over for the 2020 and the 21," recalling Juvenile's line "Cash Money Records taking over the 99 and the 2000" from his music video for "Back That Azz Up". The cover was created by Pen & Pixel, who came out of retirement for the design. It is a "nostalgic" and vintage artwork, "heavily" inspired by those of Cash Money and No Limit Records and is a nod to the "bling rap" album covers of the 1990s.

== Promotion ==
A promotional website for the album was created, featuring a live countdown to the project's release and a phone number that listeners could call to hear snippets of the tracks.

The music video for the song, "Runnin", was released on October 2, 2020. It was sent to rhythmic contemporary radio on October 13, 2020, as the album's dual lead single, along with "Mr. Right Now", featuring Canadian rapper Drake, which was serviced to urban contemporary radio. The music video for "My Dawg", was released on October 7, 2020.

== Critical reception ==
Professional ratings
Aggregate scores
Source	Rating
AnyDecentMusic?	7.4/10
Metacritic	81/100
Review scores
Source	Rating
Clash	8/10
Consequence	B+
Exclaim!	6/10
HipHopDX	4.0/5
NME	5/5 stars
Paste	8.8/10
Pitchfork	6.6/10
Rolling Stone	4/5 stars
Slant Magazine	4/5 stars
Tom Hull – on the Web	B+

Savage Mode II was met with widespread critical acclaim. At Metacritic, which assigns a normalized rating out of 100 to reviews from professional publications, the album received an average score of 81, based on 10 reviews. Aggregator AnyDecentMusic? gave it 7.4 out of 10, based on their assessment of the critical consensus.

In a positive review, Dhruva Balram of NME wrote that "As a whole, the album is confirmation of two young artists at the top of their game, watching the landscape unfold from the throne they earned themselves four years ago". Robin Murray of Clash praised the "crisp and future-facing" production from Metro Boomin, as well as the rap performances by 21 Savage. He concluded: "Savage Mode 2 matches ruthless entertainment to phenomenal artistry, a collaboration that works on a number of levels." Charles Lyons-Burt of Slant Magazine said, "It's Metro, though, who elevates 21's stories to something approaching greatness. ... This sequel is a ratification of the "bigger and better", an example of steady improvement through impeccable craft". Rashad Grove from Consequence enjoyed the album, saying, "21 Savage, accompanied by the golden touch of Metro Boomin, have given the hip-hop world their most well-rounded project to date, and they set the bar high for others to measure up to". Paste critic Trey Alston said, "Savage Mode II is a worthy successor to the original, building on that initial moment that made 21 Savage a household name. Adventurous, introspective, and thoughtful, it's just what the world needs from the rapper at this moment, even if we didn't know it". Mark Elibert of HipHopDX said, "The Grammy Award winner shows he continues to be ambitious as an artist while keeping up the Slaughter King mantra he ran with early in his career. For Young Metro, Savage Mode II asserts there's no rust on his boards and proves he's still one of the best architects in the game".

Reviewing the album for Pitchfork, Alphonse Pierre stated: "The first Savage Mode didn't become an ATL classic because of celebrity cameos or Billboard numbers; it was because Metro and 21 were at the peak of their powers, and only the producer is close here. 21 Savage is just along for the ride." Steve "Flash" Juon of RapReviews said, "The 44 minutes of this album could exist without Mr. Freeman, but they couldn't exist without Metro Boomin. ... [21 Savage's] a solid RAPPER through and through and in an era of singers I'm always going to appreciate that, but if I said I could ignore the banality of Savage Mode II lyrically I'd be lying". In a lukewarm review, Exclaim!'s Jacob Carey wrote, "Whether they hit the mark with their sequel is debatable. While Savage Mode II is by no means a lacklustre album, it may not be the exact product their fans hoped for".

=== Year-end lists ===
Select year-end rankings of Savage Mode II
Publication	List	Rank	Ref.
Billboard	The 50 Best Albums of 2020	45	
Billboard	The 20 Best Rap Albums of 2020	7	
Complex	The Best Albums of 2020	6	
The Guardian	The 50 Best Albums of 2020	37	
NPR Music	The 50 Best Albums of 2020	45	
Slant Magazine	The 50 Best Albums of 2020	49	
Spin	The 30 Best Albums of 2020	18	

== Commercial performance ==
Savage Mode II debuted at number one on the US Billboard 200 with 171,000 album-equivalent units (including 22,000 pure album sales). This became 21 Savage and Metro Boomin's second US number-one debut. The album also accumulated a total of 200.1 million on-demand streams of the album's songs during that week. In its second week, the album remained in the top ten and fell to number two. On October 27, 2025, the album was certified double platinum by the Recording Industry Association of America (RIAA) for combined sales and album-equivalent units of over two million units in the United States.

== Track listing ==
Savage Mode II track listing
No.	Title	Writer(s)	Producer(s)	Length
1.	"Intro"	Shéyaa Bin Abraham-Joseph; Leland Wayne; Mejdi Rhars; Richard Hill^{[b]}; Douglas Mackay^{[b]}	Metro Boomin; Prince 85	1:10
2.	"Runnin"	Abraham-Joseph; Wayne; Michael Masser^{[c]}; Pamela Sawyer^{[c]}	Metro Boomin	3:16
3.	"Glock in My Lap"	Abraham-Joseph; Wayne; Joshua Luellen; Carlton Mays, Jr.	Metro Boomin; Southside; Honorable C.N.O.T.E.	3:14
4.	"Mr. Right Now" (featuring Drake)	Abraham-Joseph; Wayne; Aubrey Graham; David Ruoff; Elias Klughammer; Jocelyn Donald; Joshua Goods	Metro Boomin; David x Eli	3:14
5.	"Rich Nigga Shit" (featuring Young Thug)	Abraham-Joseph; Wayne; Jeffery Williams	Metro Boomin; Peter Lee Johnson^{[a]}	3:10
6.	"Slidin"	Abraham-Joseph; Wayne; Ruoff; Klughammer; Ruben Bailey	Metro Boomin; David x Eli; Allen Ritter^{[a]}; Johnson^{[a]}	3:05
7.	"Many Men"	Abraham-Joseph; Wayne; Frederick Perren; Keni St. Lewis; John Padgett^{[d]}; Darrell Branch^{[d]}; Curtis Jackson III^{[d]}; Luis Resto^{[d]}	Metro Boomin; Johnson^{[a]}	3:22
8.	"Snitches & Rats" (interlude)	Abraham-Joseph; Wayne		0:57
9.	"Snitches & Rats" (featuring Young Nudy)	Abraham-Joseph; Wayne; Quantavious Thomas	Metro Boomin; Johnson^{[a]}	3:08
10.	"My Dawg"	Abraham-Joseph; Wayne; Ahmar Bailey; Bernd Schoenhart^{[e]}	Metro Boomin; Kid Hazel	3:02
11.	"Steppin on Niggas"	Abraham-Joseph; Wayne; Joe Cooley^{[f]}; Rodney Oliver^{[f]}; Jeffrey Page^{[f]}	Metro Boomin	2:21
12.	"Brand New Draco"	Abraham-Joseph; Wayne; Rhars	Metro Boomin; Prince 85; Johnson^{[a]}	3:22
13.	"No Opp Left Behind"	Abraham-Joseph; Wayne	Metro Boomin	3:14
14.	"RIP Luv"	Abraham-Joseph; Wayne; Xavier Dotson; Wallace Childs^{[g]}; James Epps^{[g]}; Cleveland Horne^{[g]}; Joseph Pruitt^{[g]}	Metro Boomin; Zaytoven; Johnson^{[a]}	3:34
15.	"Said N Done"	Abraham-Joseph; Wayne; Terry Alexander^{[h]}; Wayne Braithwaite^{[h]}; Barry Eastmond^{[h]}; Stephanie Mills^{[h]}	Metro Boomin	3:52
Total length:				44:01

Notes

- ^{^[a]} signifies an additional producer

Sample credits

- ^{^[b]} "Intro" contains elements from "Magnus", written and performed by Richard Hill and Douglas Mackay.
- ^{^[c]} "Runnin" contains elements from "I Thought It Took a Little Time (But Today I Fell in Love)", written by Michael Masser and Pamela Sawyer, as performed by Diana Ross.
- ^{^[d]} "Many Men" contains elements from "Tomorrow Is So Far Away", written by John Padgett, as performed by Chromatics; and elements from "Many Men (Wish Death)", written by Darrell Branch, Curtis Jackson III, and Luis Resto, as performed by 50 Cent.
- ^{^[e]} "My Dawg" contains elements from "Mystery", written and performed by Bernd Schoenhart.
- ^{^[f]} "Steppin on Niggas" contains elements from "Nobody Disses Me", written by Joe Cooley, Rodney Oliver, and Jeffrey Page, as performed by Rodney-O & Joe Cooley.
- ^{^[g]} "RIP Luv" contains elements from "Mixed Up Moods and Attitudes", written by Wallace Childs, James Epps, Cleveland Horne, and Joseph Pruitt, as performed by the Fantastic Four.
- ^{^[h]} "Said N Done" contains elements from "Touch Me Now", written by Terry Alexander, Wayne Braithwaite, Barry Eastmond, and Stephanie Mills, as performed by Stephanie Mills.

== Personnel ==
Credits adapted from the album's liner notes and Tidal.

Performance

- 21 Savage – main artist
- Metro Boomin – main artist
- Morgan Freeman – narration (tracks 1, 2, 6–8, 13–15)
- Drake – featured artist (track 4)
- Young Thug – featured artist (track 5)
- Mariah the Scientist – additional vocals (5)
- Young Nudy – featured artist (track 9)

Instrumentation

- Peter Lee Johnson – strings (tracks 1, 5, and 7), keyboards (tracks 1, 6, 7, 12, and 14), guitar (track 5)
- Siraaj Rhett – horn (track 11)
- XZ – guitar (track 14)

Production

- Metro Boomin – production (all tracks)
- Prince 85 – production (tracks 1 and 12)
- Southside – production (track 3)
- Honorable C.N.O.T.E. – production (track 3)
- David x Eli – production (tracks 4 and 6)
- Peter Lee Johnson – additional production (tracks 5, 7, 9, 12, and 14)
- Allen Ritter – additional production (track 6)
- Kid Hazel – production (track 10)
- Zaytoven – production (track 14)

Technical

- Mike Bozzi – mastering (all tracks)
- Ethan Stevens – mixing (all tracks), recording (tracks 2, 4–7, 10–14)
- Noah Hashimoto – mixing (tracks 4, 6, and 11), mixing assistance (tracks 1, 2, 4, and 6), engineering assistance (tracks 5, 7, and 10–15)
- Braden "Breezee" Davies – mixing (track 9), engineering assistance (track 8)
- Austin Ficklin – mixing assistance (track 2), engineering assistance (track 15)
- Daniel Sheeshy – mixing assistance (track 3), recording assistance (track 9)
- IbMixing – recording (track 3), recording assistance (track 9)
- Noel Cadastre – recording (track 4)
- Vern – recording assistance (track 9)
- Joshua Harbin – recording assistance (track 9)
- Ryan Youngblood – engineering assistance (tracks 5 and 12)
- Jacob Bryant – engineering assistance (track 7)
- De'Ron Billups – engineering assistance (track 7)
- Kiara Moreno – engineering assistance (track 10)
- Josh Applebee – engineering assistance (tracks 13 and 14)
- Melvin Villanueva – engineering assistance (tracks 13 and 14)
- Nino Villanueva – engineering assistance (tracks 13 and 14)

== Charts ==
=== Weekly charts ===
Chart performance for Savage Mode II
Chart (2020)	Peak position
Australian Albums (ARIA)	4
Austrian Albums (Ö3 Austria)	11
Belgian Albums (Ultratop Flanders)	4
Belgian Albums (Ultratop Wallonia)	22
Canadian Albums (Billboard)	1
Danish Albums (Hitlisten)	3
Dutch Albums (Album Top 100)	5
Finnish Albums (Suomen virallinen lista)	18
French Albums (SNEP)	15
German Albums (Offizielle Top 100)	29
Irish Albums (Official Charts)	4
Italian Albums (FIMI)	13
New Zealand Albums (RMNZ)	5
Norwegian Albums (VG-lista)	3
Spanish Albums (PROMUSICAE)	36
Swiss Albums (Schweizer Hitparade)	12
UK Albums (Official Charts)	10
US Billboard 200	1
US Top R&B/Hip-Hop Albums (Billboard)	1

=== Year-end charts ===
2020 year-end chart performance for Savage Mode II
Chart (2020)	Position
US Billboard 200	134
US Top R&B/Hip-Hop Albums (Billboard)	48

2021 year-end chart performance for Savage Mode II
Chart (2021)	Position
US Billboard 200	79
US Top R&B/Hip-Hop Albums (Billboard)	55

2023 year-end chart performance for Savage Mode II
Chart (2023)	Position
Icelandic Albums (Tónlistinn)	95
US Billboard 200	73
US Top R&B/Hip-Hop Albums (Billboard)	30

2024 year-end chart performance for Savage Mode II
Chart (2024)	Position
US Billboard 200	144
US Top R&B/Hip-Hop Albums (Billboard)	53

== Certifications ==
Certifications and sales for Savage Mode II
Region	Certification	Certified units/sales
Canada (Music Canada)	2× Platinum	160,000^{‡}
Denmark (IFPI Danmark)	Gold	10,000^{‡}
Italy (FIMI)	Gold	25,000^{‡}
Mexico (AMPROFON)	Gold	30,000^{‡}
New Zealand (RMNZ)	Platinum	15,000^{‡}
Poland (ZPAV)	Platinum	20,000^{‡}
United Kingdom (BPI)	Gold	100,000^{‡}
United States (RIAA)	2× Platinum	2,000,000^{‡}
^{‡} Sales+streaming figures based on certification alone.

== Release history ==
Release dates and formats for Savage Mode II
Region	Date	Label(s)	Format(s)	Edition	Ref.
Various	October 2, 2020	Slaughter Gang; Epic; Boominati; Republic	Digital download; streaming	Standard	
Various	October 19, 2020	Slaughter Gang; Epic; Boominati; Republic	Digital download; streaming	Remix	
Various	January 15, 2021	Slaughter Gang; Epic; Boominati; Republic	CD	Standard	
Various	February 26, 2021	Slaughter Gang; Epic; Boominati; Republic	Vinyl	Standard	
