= Glock in My Lap =

2020 song by 21 Savage and Metro Boomin

Song by 21 Savage and Metro Boomin

from the album Savage Mode II
- Released: October 2, 2020
- Genre: Gangsta rap; trap
- Length: 3:13
- Label: Slaughter Gang; Epic; Boominati; Republic
- Songwriters: Shéyaa Abraham-Joseph; Leland Wayne; Joshua Luellen; Carlton Mays, Jr.
- Producers: Metro Boomin; Southside; Honorable C.N.O.T.E.

Music video
- "Glock In My Lap" on YouTube

"Glock in My Lap" is a song by Atlanta-based rapper 21 Savage and American record producer Metro Boomin, from their collaborative studio album Savage Mode II (2020). The song was produced by Metro Boomin, Southside and Honorable C.N.O.T.E.

== Composition and critical reception ==
The song features "urgent trap drums", an "unsettling two-note piano riff" and orchestral elements. Alphonse Pierre of Pitchfork described the beat as "arguably the most cinematic" one that Metro has ever produced. In a review of Savage Mode II on HipHopDX, Mark Elibert wrote that 21 Savage's lyrics throughout the album are "more polished and lively" than before, citing the following lines from "Glock in My Lap": "Leave an opp cold, like December / .45 on me, it's a Kimber / AK knockin' down trees, like timber / Get your baby mama 'fore we bend her / Hit the windshield, not the fender / Givin' out smoke my agenda / Throw the white flag, they surrender".

== Music video ==
The official music video was released on February 24, 2021. Directed by Andrew Donoho, the video begins with 21 Savage and Metro Boomin driving one night and seeing a chainsaw wielder resembling Leatherface from The Texas Chainsaw Massacre, which leads to a car crash. The two exit their car in the midst of thick smoke and beaming red lights, and venture into a nearby "shadowy abandoned town" to look for help and hunt down the chainsaw wielder. They are joined by Honorable C.N.O.T.E. Soon, the three are confronted by the Leatherface-like character, who is eventually shot down by Metro and C.N.O.T.E.

== Charts ==
Chart performance for "Glock in My Lap"
Chart (2020)	Peak position
Canada Hot 100 (Billboard)	28
Global 200 (Billboard)	22
Ireland (IRMA)	46
New Zealand Hot Singles (RMNZ)	10
US Billboard Hot 100	19
US Hot R&B/Hip-Hop Songs (Billboard)	11

2023 chart performance for "Glock in My Lap"
Chart (2023)	Peak position
Lithuania (AGATA)	94

== Certifications ==
Certifications for "Glock in My Lap"
Region	Certification	Certified units/sales
Brazil (Pro-Música Brasil)	Platinum	40,000^{‡}
France (SNEP)	Gold	100,000^{‡}
Italy (FIMI)	Gold	50,000^{‡}
New Zealand (RMNZ)	Platinum	30,000^{‡}
Poland (ZPAV)	Platinum	50,000^{‡}
United Kingdom (BPI)	Gold	400,000^{‡}
United States (RIAA)	4× Platinum	4,000,000^{‡}
Streaming
Greece (IFPI Greece)	Gold	1,000,000^{†}
^{‡} Sales+streaming figures based on certification alone.^{†} Streaming-only figures based on certification alone.
