= Without Warning (album) =

Studio album by 21 Savage, Offset, and Metro Boomin
- Released: October 31, 2017
- Genres: Hip-hop; trap
- Length: 33:22
- Labels: Slaughter Gang; Epic; Quality Control; Motown; Capitol; Boominati; Republic
- Producers: Bijan Amir; Cubeatz; Dre Moon; Metro Boomin; Southside

21 Savage chronology
Issa Album (2017)	Without Warning (2017)	I Am > I Was (2018)

Offset chronology
Without Warning (2017)	Father of 4 (2019)

Metro Boomin chronology
Perfect Timing (2017)	Without Warning (2017)	Double or Nothing (2017)

Singles from Without Warning
- 1. "Ric Flair Drip" Released: March 1, 2018

Without Warning is a collaborative studio album by British-American rapper 21 Savage, American rapper Offset, and American record producer Metro Boomin. The album was released on October 31, 2017, by Slaughter Gang, Epic Records, Quality Control Music, Motown, Capitol Records, Boominati Worldwide, and Republic Records. It features guest appearances from Travis Scott and Quavo. Meanwhile, the album's production was handled primarily by Metro Boomin, alongside Bijan Amir, Cubeatz, Dre Moon, and Southside. Without Warning peaked at number four on the US Billboard 200, and received generally positive reviews from critics.

== Background ==
On October 30, 2017, Epic Records announced Without Warning, a collaborative album by 21 Savage, Offset, and Metro Boomin.

== Promotion ==
"Ric Flair Drip" was serviced to rhythmic contemporary radio as the album's lead single on March 1, 2018. The song peaked at number 13 on the US Billboard Hot 100.

== Critical reception ==
Professional ratings
Aggregate scores
Source	Rating
AnyDecentMusic?	7.4/10
Metacritic	78/100
Review scores
Source	Rating
Consequence	B+
Exclaim!	7/10
HipHopDX	2.8/5
HotNewHipHop	84%
Pitchfork	8.0/10
Pretty Much Amazing	B+
RapReviews	6/10
Spectrum Culture	3.25/5 stars
XXL	4/5

Without Warning was met with generally positive reviews. At Metacritic, which assigns a normalized rating out of 100 to reviews from mainstream publications, the album received an average score of 78, based on nine reviews. Aggregator AnyDecentMusic? gave it 7.4 out of 10, based on their assessment of the critical consensus.

Sheldon Pearce of Pitchfork praised the chemistry between the rappers, its Halloween aesthetic and Metro Boomin's production, stating: "It's short and cohesive, an enjoyable and uncomplicated 33 minutes of sheer exhilaration, filled with stings, itches, and cold chills. In one form or another, the collaboration comes as a surprise to all of us, arriving suddenly and carrying within the electricity and satisfaction of a good scare." Marshall Gu of Pretty Much Amazing said, "The best song comes early in "Ghostface Killers", with an excellent rapped chorus from Offset that's been running through my head since the tape dropped and Travis Scott sounding excellent as always even if he doesn't say much anything at all". Gary Suarez of Consequence said, "Where the Super Slimey too often felt like a requisite Xanax-blasted victory lap, one notably soft on hooks [...], Without Warning exudes vitality and menace". Online publication HotNewHipHop stated that Without Warning is "the rap equivalent of a slasher flick: gory, over-the-top, and a lot of fucking fun. Most of the horror vibe comes from Metro, who expertly throws in demented laughing, chainsaws, gunshots, wolf howls, creepy music boxes, and Rosemary's Baby-level haunting backing vocals as backing tracks to his instrumentals. And goddamn, those instrumentals. Big bells, eerie piano, reverby bass, and sci-fi synths set the tone, but the way he deploys them shows the most progress. There are no predictable build-ups, and the way he tailors the ins and outs of his beats to each rappers' flows and emphases is impeccable". Chris Gibbons of XXL said, "Without Warning is more than a Halloween novelty. Offset and 21 Savage turn their differences in delivery into an undeniable chemistry, while Metro Boomin's production gives the project a proper Halloween-inspired sound so their comparisons to classic villains like Freddy Krueger and Jason Voorhees aren't in vain".

Andrew Matson of Mass Appeal gave the album a favourable review, commenting: "It's a bit weird to joyfully toast an album that's so dark, and contains a lot of murder/guns talk. But what's most apparent here is two artists in love with their art, rapping from gangster/villain points of view. Both are experiencing crazy levels of success they might never have imagined, both are carving their own unique lanes through rap while staying true to their styles. It seems to have worked out naturally that they make music that can be extremely Halloween-ish, and that's the day we get Without Warning. What else can you say about why this project works? Sometimes shit lines up, and that's a beautiful thing." In a mixed review, HipHopDX's Trent Clark stated: "Like most projects that get recorded without the guise of a meticulous A&R, Without Warning's billing never exceeds the expectations of any artist—rapper or producer—let alone offer a glimpse of what allows these individuals to rank amongst 2017 Hip Hop's most popular figures."

=== Year-end lists ===
Select year-end rankings of Without Warning
Publication	List	Rank	Ref.
Billboard	Billboard's 50 Best Albums of 2017	49	
Complex	The Best Albums of 2017	40	

== Commercial performance ==
Without Warning debuted at number four on the US Billboard 200 with 53,000 album-equivalent units, 11,000 of which were pure album sales. It is 21 Savage's second top 10 album, and Offset (as a solo artist) and Metro Boomin's first top 10 album. Six songs from the album managed to chart on the US Billboard Hot 100, led by "Ric Flair Drip", which peaked at number 13, becoming both Metro Boomin and Offset's highest-charting song as lead artists.

== Track listing ==
Without Warning track listing
No.	Title	Writer(s)	Producer(s)	Length
1.	"Ghostface Killers" (featuring Travis Scott)	Shéyaa Abraham-Joseph; Kiari Cephus; Leland Wayne; Jacques Webster II	Metro Boomin	4:28
2.	"Rap Saved Me" (featuring Quavo)	Abraham-Joseph; Cephus; Wayne; Quavious Marshall	Metro Boomin	4:17
3.	"Ric Flair Drip" (performed by Offset and Metro Boomin)	Cephus; Wayne; Bijan Amirkhani	Metro Boomin; Bijan Amir	2:52
4.	"My Choppa Hate Niggas" (performed by 21 Savage and Metro Boomin)	Abraham-Joseph; Wayne; Kevin Gomringer; Tim Gomringer	Metro Boomin; Cubeatz	2:28
5.	"Nightmare" (performed by Offset and Metro Boomin)	Cephus; Wayne	Metro Boomin	2:27
6.	"Mad Stalkers"	Abraham-Joseph; Cephus; Wayne; Andre Proctor	Metro Boomin; Dre Moon	3:22
7.	"Disrespectful"	Abraham-Joseph; Cephus; Wayne	Metro Boomin	2:40
8.	"Run Up the Racks" (performed by 21 Savage and Metro Boomin)	Abraham-Joseph; Wayne; Joshua Luellen	Metro Boomin; Southside	3:09
9.	"Still Serving"	Abraham-Joseph; Cephus; Wayne; K. Gomringer; T. Gomringer	Metro Boomin; Cubeatz	3:51
10.	"Darth Vader"	Abraham-Joseph; Cephus; Wayne	Metro Boomin	3:48
Total length:				33:22

== Personnel ==
Credits were adapted from Tidal.

Performers

- 21 Savage – primary artist (tracks 1, 2, 4, 6–10)
- Offset – primary artist (tracks 1–3, 5–7, 9, 10)
- Travis Scott – featured artist (track 1)
- Quavo – featured artist (track 2)

Technical

- Ethan Stevans – mixing engineer (all tracks)
- Joe LaPorta – mastering engineer (all tracks)

Production

- Metro Boomin – producer (all tracks), primary artist (all tracks)
- Bijan Amir – producer (track 3)
- Cubeatz – producer (tracks 4, 9)
- Dre Moon – producer (track 6)
- Southside – producer (track 8)

== Charts ==
=== Weekly charts ===
Chart performance for Without Warning
Chart (2017)	Peak position
Australian Albums (ARIA)	39
Belgian Albums (Ultratop Flanders)	49
Belgian Albums (Ultratop Wallonia)	101
Canadian Albums (Billboard)	5
Danish Albums (Hitlisten)	8
Dutch Albums (Album Top 100)	24
Finnish Albums (Suomen virallinen lista)	13
French Albums (SNEP)	76
Italian Albums (FIMI)	77
Latvian Albums (LaIPA)	9
New Zealand Albums (RMNZ)	15
Norwegian Albums (VG-lista)	7
Swedish Albums (Sverigetopplistan)	13
UK Albums (Official Charts)	41
US Billboard 200	4
US Top R&B/Hip-Hop Albums (Billboard)	2
US Top Rap Albums (Billboard)	1

=== Year-end charts ===
2017 year-end chart performance for Without Warning
Chart (2017)	Position
US Top R&B/Hip-Hop Albums (Billboard)	82

2018 year-end chart performance for Without Warning
Chart (2018)	Position
Canadian Albums (Billboard)	43
Danish Albums (Hitlisten)	97
Icelandic Albums (Plötutíóindi)	48
Swedish Albums (Sverigetopplistan)	75
US Billboard 200	45
US Top R&B/Hip-Hop Albums (Billboard)	32

== Certifications ==
Certifications for Without Warning
Region	Certification	Certified units/sales
Denmark (IFPI Danmark)	Platinum	20,000^{‡}
Italy (FIMI)	Gold	25,000^{‡}
New Zealand (RMNZ)	Platinum	15,000^{‡}
Poland (ZPAV)	Gold	10,000^{‡}
United Kingdom (BPI)	Silver	60,000^{‡}
^{‡} Sales+streaming figures based on certification alone.
