= Pop Ur Shit =

2024 song by 21 Savage, Young Thug and Metro Boomin

Song by 21 Savage, Young Thug and Metro Boomin

from the album American Dream
- Released: January 12, 2024
- Recorded: 2023
- Genre: Hip hop; trap
- Length: 3:13
- Label: Epic; Slaughter Gang
- Songwriters: Shéyaa Abraham-Joseph; Jeffery Williams; Leland Wayne; Allen Ritter
- Producers: Metro Boomin; Ritter

"Pop Ur Shit" is a song by British-American rapper 21 Savage, American rapper Young Thug and American record producer Metro Boomin, taken from Savage's third studio album, American Dream (2024).

== Background and composition ==
"Pop Ur Shit" is a trap song. In the post-chorus, 21 Savage compares the smell of marijuana to that of feces. The song features a previously unreleased verse from Young Thug that is censored due to his lyrics being used as evidence of crimes in his RICO case.

== Critical reception ==
The song received generally mixed reviews from music critics. Will Schube of HipHopDX wrote the song is "formulaic Atlanta trap, but it works because of Metro Boomin's beat and a more-alien-than-usual guest feature from Young Thug", before remarking that 21 Savage "has the temerity to rap: 'It smell like gas, I think somebody pooped.' It would be funny if it wasn't so embarrassing." Mosi Reeves of Rolling Stone commented the song "sounds hard as nails" but its chorus "feel[s] underwritten, perhaps making them more effective to chant along with during his arena shows." Grant Rindner of Variety considered it one of the "standout cuts" from American Dream, though also stating that Young Thug's verse "sounds hastily censored in a way that disrupts its rhythm". Aaron Williams of Uproxx commented the song's hook "is so bad, you might have to grit your teeth to get to Thug's verse — then immediately hit 'skip.'"

== Charts ==
Chart performance for "Pop Ur Shit"
Chart (2024)	Peak position
Canada Hot 100 (Billboard)	29
Global 200 (Billboard)	44
US Billboard Hot 100	31
US Hot R&B/Hip-Hop Songs (Billboard)	13
