= 10 Freaky Girls =

2018 song by Metro Boomin featuring 21 Savage

Song by Metro Boomin featuring 21 Savage

from the album Not All Heroes Wear Capes
- Released: November 2, 2018
- Length: 3:28
- Label: Boominati; Republic
- Songwriter(s): Leland Wayne; Shéyaa Abraham-Joseph; Michael Jones
- Producer(s): Metro Boomin

Music video
- "10 Freaky Girls" on YouTube

"10 Freaky Girls" is a song by American record producer Metro Boomin featuring Atlanta-based rapper 21 Savage. It was released on November 2, 2018 as a track from Metro Boomin's debut studio album Not All Heroes Wear Capes (2018). The song contains a sample of "Are You the Woman" by Kashif and Whitney Houston.

== Composition ==
The song's instrumental contains trumpets, while the sample provides vocals, harmonica, strings, and synths. In the outro of the song, the harmonica plays and 21 Savage tells of an encounter with someone he had previously robbed who was unexpectedly happy to see him.

== Music video ==
A music video for the song was directed by Zac Facts and released on January 22, 2019. The video opens with a woman in a liquor store. Metro Boomin is then seen playing the harmonica, while another woman takes a bath in marshmallows. Throughout the video, 21 Savage raps in a dark room, surrounded by women while explosions occasionally appear in the background. The woman in the liquor store takes MDMA in one scene. A classic wood-sided station wagon also appears as a center of attention. The video ends with Savage wearing pajamas and telling his anecdote to women in satin pajamas, and a marching band appears in the last scene.

== Charts ==
Chart performance for "10 Freaky Girls"
Chart (2018)	Peak position
Canada (Canadian Hot 100)	39
Ireland (IRMA)	58
New Zealand Hot Singles (RMNZ)	5
Switzerland (Schweizer Hitparade)	82
UK Singles (OCC)	69
US Billboard Hot 100	42
US Hot R&B/Hip-Hop Songs (Billboard)	20

== Certifications ==
Certifications for "10 Freaky Girls"
Region	Certification	Certified units/sales
Australia (ARIA)	2× Platinum	140,000^{‡}
Brazil (Pro-Música Brasil)	Gold	20,000^{‡}
Canada (Music Canada)	4× Platinum	320,000^{‡}
New Zealand (RMNZ)	Platinum	30,000^{‡}
Portugal (AFP)	Gold	5,000^{‡}
United Kingdom (BPI)	Gold	400,000^{‡}
United States (RIAA)	3× Platinum	3,000,000^{‡}
^{‡} Sales+streaming figures based on certification alone.
