= Runnin (21 Savage and Metro Boomin song) =

2020 single by 21 Savage and Metro Boomin

Single by 21 Savage and Metro Boomin

from the album Savage Mode II
- Released: October 13, 2020
- Studio: Astro (Atlanta); Circle House (Miami)
- Genre: Hip hop; trap
- Length: 3:16
- Label: Slaughter Gang; Epic; Boominati; Republic
- Songwriters: Shéyaa Bin Abraham-Joseph; Leland Wayne; Michael Masser; Pamela Sawyer; Chason Samuel
- Producers: Metro Boomin; Chason Samuel

21 Savage singles chronology
"Bad Guy" (2020)	"Runnin" / "Mr. Right Now" (2020)	"Spiral" (2021)

Metro Boomin singles chronology
"Dead Meat 2.0" (2019)	"Runnin" / "Mr. Right Now" (2020)	"Striker #1 Remix" (2021)

Music video
- "Runnin" on YouTube

"Runnin" is a song by British-American rapper 21 Savage and American record producer Metro Boomin. It was released on October 2, 2020, as the opening track from their collaborative album Savage Mode II. The "haunting" song samples Diana Ross' 1976 song "I Thought It Took a Little Time", with 21 Savage delivering lethal threats to his enemies in a casual fashion. The official video sees 21 take a victory lap through the streets of his hometown, celebrating his Grammy award for "A Lot". It was serviced to US rhythmic radio on October 13, 2020, together with "Mr. Right Now" as the dual lead singles from the album. Debuting and peaking at number nine on the Billboard Hot 100, it was both artists' highest-charting song as lead artists, until the releases of "My Life", "Creepin'", "Type Shit", and "Like That".

== Composition and lyrics ==
"Runnin" is a "soulful" and "spooky" track, with Metro Boomin converting a sample of Diana Ross' 1976 song "I Thought It Took a Little Time" into a "haunting" loop, built around an "ominous" set of drums. Lyrically, the song sees 21 Savage return to "the real, ultra-violent subject matter that brought him to the forefront of hip hop", as he delves into his "lethal tendencies", delivering lines about his arsenal of weapons and posing threats to enemies who refuse to stay in their place. The fast-paced beat coupled with 21's flow "denotes that he can 'run' with the track". As with other tracks on the album, the song features narration by Morgan Freeman, who poses the question: "Are things better or worse the second time around?"

== Critical reception ==
Rap-Up and Complex both regarded the song as a standout from the album, with Complex's Jessica McKinney favoring the chorus, which, she stated, "while monotone, sends chills through the speakers". Noting the song's soul sample, Micah Peters of The Ringer said in contrast to 21 Savage's second album, I Am > I Was, "'Runnin' slithers back into someplace deep and murky, and crackles with the manic energy needed to adequately soundtrack a weekend's madness". Revolt's Jon Powell stated: "Presumably, the three-and-a-half minute long gesture is a statement to remind his listeners that he's [21 Savage] still the same man from the critically-acclaimed Slaughter mixtapes". Similarly, Dhruva Balram of NME opined that "Runnin" follows the album's "elegiac theme, with Boomin's haunting production tailor-made for Savage's casual cadence and flow as he paints grisly scenes with a calm demeanour". In their album review, Consequence of Sound's Rashad Grove wrote: "On 'Running', Boomin's dark, haunting production is tailor-made for Savage's rhythmic cadences, casual flow, and unapologetic rawness".

== Music video ==
The official music video premiered less than a day after the album's release. It was shot in August 2020, as the video's intro displays: "On January 26th, 2020, Savage won the grammy for best rap song. On August 26th, 2020, him & Metro brought the grammy to Atlanta". In the visual, 21 Savage takes a tour through his hometown Atlanta, while showing off his first Grammy award, which he won in January 2020 for Best Rap Song for "A Lot". Sharing the celebration of his win and symbolizing motivation, 21 lets the trophy travel through the hands of various local residents; as noted by Rap-Up, one woman holds the Grammy in her hand while twerking on the hood of a car, while a skateboarder jumps over it. Metro Boomin, meanwhile, pays homage to rap duo Three 6 Mafia, sporting their name on his shirt and wearing a MAGA-inspired hat, which reads "Make DJ Paul and Juicy J Three 6 Mafia again".

== Charts ==
Chart (2020)	Peak position
Australia (ARIA)	52
Austria (Ö3 Austria Top 40)	65
Belgium (Ultratip Bubbling Under Flanders)	22
Belgium (Ultratop 50 Wallonia)	28
Canada Hot 100 (Billboard)	13
France (SNEP)	115
Global 200 (Billboard)	9
Iceland (Tónlistinn)	25
Ireland (IRMA)	28
Netherlands (Single Top 100)	76
New Zealand Hot Singles (RMNZ)	5
Portugal (AFP)	57
Switzerland (Schweizer Hitparade)	28
UK Singles (Official Charts)	43
US Billboard Hot 100	9
US Hot R&B/Hip-Hop Songs (Billboard)	5

== Certifications ==
Region	Certification	Certified units/sales
Brazil (Pro-Música Brasil)	Platinum	40,000^{‡}
Canada (Music Canada)	Gold	40,000^{‡}
Denmark (IFPI Danmark)	Gold	45,000^{‡}
Italy (FIMI)	Gold	50,000^{‡}
New Zealand (RMNZ)	2× Platinum	60,000^{‡}
Poland (ZPAV)	Gold	25,000^{‡}
United Kingdom (BPI)	Silver	200,000^{‡}
United States (RIAA)	5× Platinum	5,000,000^{‡}
^{‡} Sales+streaming figures based on certification alone.

== Release history ==
Country	Date	Format	Label	Ref.
Various	October 2, 2020	Digital download; streaming	Slaughter Gang; Epic; Boominati; Republic	
United States	October 13, 2020	Rhythmic contemporary radio	Slaughter Gang; Epic; Boominati; Republic	
