= Mr. Right Now =

2020 single by 21 Savage and Metro Boomin featuring Drake

Single by 21 Savage and Metro Boomin featuring Drake

from the album Savage Mode II
- Released: October 13, 2020
- Length: 3:14
- Label: Slaughter Gang; Epic; Boominati; Republic
- Songwriters: Shéyaa Bin Abraham-Joseph; Leland Wayne; Aubrey Graham; David Ruoff; Elias Klughammer; Jocelyn Donald; Joshua Goods; Chason Samuel
- Producers: Metro Boomin; David x Eli; Chason Samuel

Drake and 21 Savage singles chronology
"Sneakin'" (2016)	"Mr. Right Now" (2020)	"Knife Talk" (2021)

21 Savage singles chronology
"Bad Guy" (2020)	"Mr. Right Now" / "Runnin" (2020)	"Spiral" (2021)

Metro Boomin singles chronology
"Dead Meat 2.0" (2019)	"Mr. Right Now" / "Runnin" (2020)	"Striker #1 Remix" (2021)

Drake singles chronology
"Twist & Turn" (2020)	"Mr. Right Now" (2020)	"You're Mines Still (Remix)" (2020)

"Mr. Right Now" is a song by British-American rapper 21 Savage and American record producer Metro Boomin from their collaborative album Savage Mode II. It features Canadian rapper Drake, who garnered attention for his verse in which he alludes to dating singer SZA. The R&B-esque ballad marks the fourth collaboration between 21 Savage and Drake. The song was sent to US urban radio on October 13, 2020, as the dual lead single from the album, alongside "Runnin".

== Background ==
"Mr. Right Now" marks the fourth collaboration between 21 Savage and Drake, following "Sneakin'", "Sacrifices", and the unreleased leaked track "Issa". The two rappers gifted each other chains following the song's release.

== Composition and lyrics ==
"Mr. Right Now" is an R&B-leaning ballad, containing a light instrumental. Micah Peters of The Ringer deemed the song "an extremely competent 'for the ladies' song", with 21 Savage rapping about spoiling his better half, and "waiting on her hand and foot". Drake reveals in his verse that he dated singer SZA in 2008, with the line "Cause I used to date SZA back in '08 / If you cool with it, baby, she can still play". SZA confirmed this in a series of tweets, but said they actually dated in 2009, assuming that Drake "just innocently rhymed 2008 with wait". SZA, who was around 17 or 18 years old at the time, reiterated that "nothing underage of creepy" was happening and that it was "completely innocent". Drake previously rapped about SZA on his 2018 track "Diplomatic Immunity", in which he said he knew SZA from "way back", referring to her by her real name, Solána. The song is in the key of F major with a tempo of 86/172 BPM with a time signature of 4/4 in common time.

== Critical reception ==
Eric Skelton of Complex stated: "It's a bold move choosing to handle hook duties on a song with Mr. Singer-Rapper himself, Drake, but 21's 'I'mma sliiiiiiiiide' chorus is the kind of off-kilter chorus that crawls its way inside your brain and never leaves". HotNewHipHop's Alex Zidel praised 21 Savage's growth and said the song showcases that he "can also craft a perfectly good love song for the bedroom". Zidel also complimented the hook as "golden", and stated, "the production fits perfectly with Savage's flow. The lyrics are interesting enough to catch on, especially with Drake admitting that he used to date SZA in 2008". Trey Alston of Paste was not favorable of the song, stating: "The album's biggest song feels like an uncomfortable failure, from the beat to 21 Savage's admission that he's a savage but he likes to have sex to Beyoncé songs. You can practically hear him reading off of his phone, which ordinarily isn't a bad thing, but when you compare it to how lively and passionate his most violent bars are, it feels like it's coming a little too soon". Alston concluded that the song "almost sounds like a throwaway from Drake's forthcoming Certified Lover Boy album that he gave to 21 Savage. Alphonse Pierre wrote in Pitchfork's album review that the "in-his-feelings side" of 21 Savage's personality is "gimmicky", and is most clear on "Mr. Right Now". Clash's Robin Murray named it a "key track" from the album, but criticized Drake's revelation that he dated SZA as "quite ugly", stating "it plays in Drake's tendency towards cataloguing his love life, treating women as trophies".

== Charts ==
=== Weekly charts ===
Chart (2020)	Peak position
Australia (ARIA)	39
Canada Hot 100 (Billboard)	9
France (SNEP)	125
Netherlands (Single Top 100)	85
Iceland (Tónlistinn)	31
Ireland (IRMA)	23
New Zealand Hot Singles (RMNZ)	3
Portugal (AFP)	63
Sweden Heatseeker (Sverigetopplistan)	6
Switzerland (Schweizer Hitparade)	48
UK Singles (Official Charts)	28
US Billboard Hot 100	10
US Hot R&B/Hip-Hop Songs (Billboard)	6
US Rhythmic Airplay (Billboard)	6

=== Year-end charts ===
Chart (2021)	Position
US Hot R&B/Hip-Hop Songs (Billboard)	65
US Rhythmic (Billboard)	43

== Certifications ==
Region	Certification	Certified units/sales
Canada (Music Canada)	Gold	40,000^{‡}
New Zealand (RMNZ)	Gold	15,000^{‡}
United States (RIAA)	3× Platinum	3,000,000^{‡}
^{‡} Sales+streaming figures based on certification alone.

== Release history ==
Country	Date	Format	Label	Ref.
Various	October 2, 2020	Digital download; streaming	Slaughter Gang; Epic; Boominati; Republic	
United States	October 13, 2020	Urban contemporary radio	Slaughter Gang; Epic; Boominati; Republic	
