= No Heart (song) =

Single by 21 Savage and Metro Boomin

from the album Savage Mode
- Released: October 19, 2016
- Recorded: 2016
- Genre: Gangsta rap; trap; hardcore hip hop
- Length: 3:55
- Label: Epic
- Songwriters: Shayaa Joseph; Leland Wayne; Joshua Luellen; Kevin Gomringer; Tim Gomringer
- Producers: Metro Boomin; Southside; Cubeatz

21 Savage singles chronology
"X" (2016)	"No Heart" (2016)	"Sneakin'" (2016)

Metro Boomin singles chronology
"X" (2016)	"No Heart" (2016)	"No Complaints" (2017)

Music video
- "No Heart" on YouTube

"No Heart" is a song recorded by British-American rapper 21 Savage and American record producer Metro Boomin. It was released on October 19, 2016, by Epic Records and served as the second single from their collaborative extended play Savage Mode. The song was certified Platinum by the Recording Industry Association of America (RIAA).

== Background and release ==
This song was initially released on July 15, 2016, off of their debut EP Savage Mode. Metro Boomin hinted at the track on Twitter a week before Savage Mode's release date. It was then released as a single on October 19, 2016.

== Music video ==
The song's accompanying music video premiered on October 18, 2016, on 21 Savage's account on YouTube. The video reenacts the store scene from the film Menace II Society.

== Charts ==
=== Weekly charts ===
Chart (2016–17)	Peak position
Canada Hot 100 (Billboard)	79
US Billboard Hot 100	43
US Hot R&B/Hip-Hop Songs (Billboard)	17
US Hot Rap Songs (Billboard)	12

=== Year-end charts ===
Chart (2017)	Position
US Hot R&B/Hip-Hop Songs (Billboard)	69

== Certifications ==
Region	Certification	Certified units/sales
Canada (Music Canada)	Platinum	80,000^{‡}
New Zealand (RMNZ)	Platinum	30,000^{‡}
United Kingdom (BPI)	Silver	200,000^{‡}
United States (RIAA)	4× Platinum	4,000,000^{‡}
^{‡} Sales+streaming figures based on certification alone.

== Release history ==
Region	Date	Format	Label	Ref.
Worldwide	October 19, 2016	Digital download; streaming	—N/a	
