= X (21 Savage and Metro Boomin song) =

Single by 21 Savage and Metro Boomin featuring Future

from the album Savage Mode
- Released: July 14, 2016
- Recorded: 2016
- Genre: Trap
- Length: 4:18
- Label: Self-released
- Songwriters: Shayaa Joseph; Leland Wayne; Nayvadius Wilburn
- Producers: Metro Boomin; 21 Savage

21 Savage singles chronology
"Lit" (2016)	"X" (2016)	"No Heart" (2016)

Metro Boomin singles chronology
"Chanel Vintage" (2014)	"X" (2016)	"No Heart" (2016)

Future singles chronology
"Campaign" (2016)	"X" (2016)	"Do You Mind" (2016)

Music video
- "X" on YouTube

"X" (originally titled "X Bitch") is a song written and performed by British-American rapper 21 Savage and American record producer Metro Boomin featuring fellow Atlanta-based rapper Future. Produced by the former two, it was released on July 14, 2016, as the lead single from their collaborative extended play, Savage Mode (2016). The song was certified double platinum by the Recording Industry Association of America (RIAA).

== Background and release ==
On July 2, 2016, 21 Savage announced his collaborative EP with Metro Boomin, sharing the artwork and the release date. On July 14, he shared the EP's track listing and released "X" featuring Future as the project's first single. He released Savage Mode on July 15. While talking about the song's success in an interview with Rolling Out magazine, he said; "I knew the song was taking off when I looked at iTunes and saw the numbers and all the views".

== Critical reception ==
Eric Diep of HipHopDX wrote that "X" is "a good entry point for listeners just learning about 21". Niya Hogans from Rolling Out gave the song a positive review, saying that it has "catchy lyrics and a dope beat". Rolling Stone ranked it at number 21 on its 50 Best Songs of 2016 list, commenting: “The Atlanta trap contender teams up with Future for a thugged-and-drugged banger, boasting "I spent your rent at the mall," while producer Metro Boomin gives it all a creepy cinematic vibe.” Fact named it as one of the 20 best rap and R&B tracks of 2016.

== Music video ==
The music video for "X" was released on December 25, 2016. The video was directed by Vincent Lou.

== Live performances ==
On September 17, 2016, 21 Savage performed the song at the BET Hip Hop Awards, which aired in the next month.

== Charts ==
=== Weekly charts ===
Chart (2016)	Peak position
Canada Hot 100 (Billboard)	66
US Billboard Hot 100	36
US Hot R&B/Hip-Hop Songs (Billboard)	12
US Hot Rap Songs (Billboard)	8

=== Year-end charts ===
Chart (2016)	Position
US Hot R&B/Hip-Hop Songs (Billboard)	79
Chart (2017)	Position
US Hot R&B/Hip-Hop Songs (Billboard)	74

== Certifications ==
Certifications for "X"
Region	Certification	Certified units/sales
Canada (Music Canada)	2× Platinum	160,000^{‡}
New Zealand (RMNZ)	Platinum	30,000^{‡}
United Kingdom (BPI)	Silver	200,000^{‡}
United States (RIAA)	5× Platinum	5,000,000^{‡}
^{‡} Sales+streaming figures based on certification alone.

== Release history ==
Region	Date	Format	Label	Ref.
Worldwide	July 14, 2016	Digital download; streaming	—N/a	
