= Rich Nigga Shit =

2020 song by 21 Savage and Metro Boomin featuring Young Thug

Song by 21 Savage and Metro Boomin featuring Young Thug

from the album Savage Mode II
- Released: October 2, 2020
- Length: 3:10
- Label: Slaughter Gang; Epic; Boominati; Republic
- Songwriters: Shéyaa Abraham-Joseph; Leland Wayne; Jeffery Williams
- Producers: Metro Boomin; Peter Lee Johnson (add.)

"Rich Nigga Shit", edited for radio as "Rich N*gga Sh*t", is a song by Atlanta-based rapper 21 Savage and American record producer Metro Boomin, from their collaborative studio album Savage Mode II (2020). It features American rapper Young Thug and was produced by Metro Boomin with additional production from Peter Lee Johnson.

== Composition ==
The instrumental of the song contains "peppy" synths and fiddle along with a "subtle but dynamic" bassline which "mimics an analog instrument", Rolling Stone's Danny Schwartz described it as a "slow-motion, DJ Screw-indebted beat seemingly dipped in codeine". The lyrics center on the lavish lifestyles of 21 Savage and Young Thug. Consequence's Rashad Grove described the song "sounds like a modernized version of Teddy Riley's New Jack Swing that ruled the late '80s through the mid-'90s."

== Critical reception ==
Rashad Grove of Consequence gave the song a positive review, writing, "It's jamming for sure, destined to be an anthem for ballers everywhere. While 21 and Young Thug both make the song a banger, it's Metro Boomin's distinct ear and musicianship that stand out. He is staking his claim as one of the go-to producers of his generation." Alphonse Pierre of Pitchfork praised the production's combination of a "hypnotic" string section with a "breezy West Coast vibe (and lots of cowbell)", stating "It shouldn't work but does, like a french fry dipped in a milkshake", as well as writing, "21 comes off slightly unnatural on the song, ultimately overshadowed by a Young Thug guest verse memorable enough to reignite Metro Thuggin pipedreams."

== Charts ==
Chart performance for "Rich Nigga Shit"
Chart (2020)	Peak position
Canada Hot 100 (Billboard)	33
Global 200 (Billboard)	29
New Zealand Hot Singles (RMNZ)	7
UK Singles (OCC)	54
US Billboard Hot 100	26
US Hot R&B/Hip-Hop Songs (Billboard)	13

== Certifications ==
Certifications for "Rich Nigga Shit"
Region	Certification	Certified units/sales
Brazil (Pro-Música Brasil)	Platinum	40,000^{‡}
United Kingdom (BPI)	Silver	200,000^{‡}
United States (RIAA)	3× Platinum	3,000,000^{‡}
^{‡} Sales+streaming figures based on certification alone.
