= Overdue (song) =

2018 song by Metro Boomin ft. Travis Scott

Song by Metro Boomin featuring Travis Scott

from the album Not All Heroes Wear Capes
- Released: November 2, 2018
- Length: 2:46
- Label: Boominati; Republic
- Songwriters: Leland Wayne; Jacques Webster II; Hannah Robinson; Annie Strand; Richard Phillips
- Producers: Metro Boomin; Milan Beker (add.)

"Overdue" is a song by American record producer Metro Boomin featuring American rapper Travis Scott from the former's debut studio album Not All Heroes Wear Capes (2018). With additional production from Milan Beker, the song samples the Berlin Breakdown Version of "Anthonio" by Annie, from the 2014 film The Guest.

== Composition ==
"Overdue" finds Travis Scott reflecting on feeling like he "overdid" himself with making hit songs and excessive partying, over an instrumental which prominently features a sped-up vocal sample of "Anthonio". Toward the end of the song, rapper 21 Savage provides background vocals through ad-libs, setting the stage for the next track on Not All Heroes Wear Capes, "Don't Come Out the House".

== Critical reception ==
The song was well-received by music critics. In a review of the song, Karlton Jahmal wrote it "sounds like there was no other man on this planet that was made for this instrumental other than Trav." Neil Z. Yeung of AllMusic called it a highlight from Not All Heroes Wear Capes. Critics have also praised the transition into "Don't Come Out The House"; Marcus Blackwell of HipHopDX wrote, "Such tie-in beauty in is revealed when Travis Scott skates melodically on the icy joint 'Overdue,' which somehow seamlessly moves into the project's most menacing record 'Don't Come Out The House.'" Similarly, Thomas Hobbs of Highsnobiety considered it "a sign of just how brilliantly this record [Not All Heroes Wears Capes] is sequenced".

== Charts ==
Chart (2018)	Peak position
Canada Hot 100 (Billboard)	67
New Zealand Hot Singles (RMNZ)	9
Switzerland (Schweizer Hitparade)	95
UK Singles (Official Charts)	86
US Billboard Hot 100	62
US Hot R&B/Hip-Hop Songs (Billboard)	30

== Certifications ==
Region	Certification	Certified units/sales
Australia (ARIA)	Platinum	70,000^{‡}
Brazil (Pro-Música Brasil)	Gold	20,000^{‡}
Canada (Music Canada)	Platinum	80,000^{‡}
France (SNEP)	Gold	100,000^{‡}
New Zealand (RMNZ)	Platinum	30,000^{‡}
Poland (ZPAV)	Gold	25,000^{‡}
United Kingdom (BPI)	Silver	200,000^{‡}
United States (RIAA)	Platinum	1,000,000^{‡}
^{‡} Sales+streaming figures based on certification alone.
