= Savage Mode =

EP by 21 Savage and Metro Boomin
- Released: July 15, 2016
- Recorded: 2015–2016
- Length: 32:22
- Label: Self-released
- Producer: Metro Boomin (also exec.); 21 Savage; Cubeatz; G Koop; Sonny Digital; Southside; Zaytoven

21 Savage chronology
Slaughter King (2015)	Savage Mode (2016)	Issa Album (2017)

Metro Boomin chronology
19 & Boomin (2013)	Savage Mode (2016)	DropTopWop (2017)

Singles from Savage Mode
- 1. "X" Released: July 14, 2016; 2. "No Heart" Released: October 19, 2016

Savage Mode is a collaborative extended play by rapper 21 Savage and American record producer Metro Boomin. It was released on July 15, 2016. It features a sole guest appearance by American rapper Future. The EP was self-released. The EP received acclaim from critics, with Rolling Stone including it in its list of the 40 Best Rap Albums of 2016. A sequel album, Savage Mode II, was released on October 2, 2020 to further acclaim.

== Critical reception ==
Professional ratings
Review scores
Source	Rating
Exclaim!	6/10
HipHopDX	3.7/5
HotNewHipHop	83%
Pitchfork	7.0/10
XXL	4/5

Pitchfork called the project 21 Savage's "strongest and bleakest work" and praised the "brooding, eerie production" by Metro Boomin. Complex called it "a minor masterpiece in sound design", noting that "for as merciless as 21 Savage's writing can be, the album borders on ambient." HotNewHipHop stated that "its style unequivocally trumps its substance, which is par for the course in this school of arty street rap, but its form – a compact, impeccably-curated product – is sorely missing from the genre." Exclaim! called the album "a grim, pearl clutching narrative straight from the South." In a positive review, Craig Jenkins of Vulture called it "gleefully ultraviolent and pridefully indulgent", stating that "this music is built from the same casual hopelessness that shocks us cold whenever we awake to fresh news of mass murder or police brutality."

== Track listing ==
No.	Title	Writer(s)	Producer(s)	Length
1.	"No Advance"	Shayaa Joseph; Leland Wayne	Metro Boomin	4:36
2.	"No Heart"	Joseph; Wayne; Joshua Luellen; Kevin Gomringer; Tim Gomringer	Metro Boomin; Southside; Cubeatz	3:55
3.	"X" (featuring Future)	Joseph; Wayne; Nayvadius Wilburn	Metro Boomin; 21 Savage	4:18
4.	"Savage Mode"	Joseph; Wayne	Metro Boomin	4:09
5.	"Bad Guy"	Joseph; Wayne; Sonny Uwaezuoke	Metro Boomin; Sonny Digital	2:49
6.	"Real Nigga"	Joseph; Wayne	Metro Boomin	3:05
7.	"Mad High"	Joseph; Wayne	Metro Boomin	3:00
8.	"Feel It"	Joseph; Wayne; Xavier Dotson	Metro Boomin; Zaytoven	2:43
9.	"Ocean Drive"	Joseph; Wayne; Luellen; Robert Mandell	Metro Boomin; Southside; G Koop	3:47
Total length:				32:22

Notes

- "X" was originally titled "X Bitch"

== Charts ==
=== Weekly charts ===
Chart (2016–2017)	Peak position
Canadian Albums (Billboard)	57
Latvian Albums (LaIPA)	84
US Billboard 200	23
US Independent Albums (Billboard)	8
US Top R&B/Hip-Hop Albums (Billboard)	9
US Top Rap Albums (Billboard)	7

=== Year-end charts ===
Chart (2016)	Position
US Billboard 200	185
Chart (2017)	Position
US Billboard 200	58
US Top R&B/Hip-Hop Albums (Billboard)	59

== Certifications ==
Region	Certification	Certified units/sales
New Zealand (RMNZ)	Gold	7,500^{‡}
United States (RIAA)	Gold	500,000^{‡}
^{‡} Sales+streaming figures based on certification alone.
