= Don't Come Out the House =

2018 song by Metro Boomin featuring 21 Savage

Song by Metro Boomin featuring 21 Savage

from the album Not All Heroes Wear Capes
- Released: November 2, 2018
- Genre: Horrorcore; gangsta rap
- Length: 2:48
- Label: Boominati; Republic
- Songwriters: Leland Wayne; Shéyaa Abraham-Joseph; Brytavious Chambers
- Producers: Metro Boomin; Tay Keith

"Don't Come Out the House" is a song by American record producer Metro Boomin featuring rapper 21 Savage. It was released on November 2, 2018 from Metro's debut studio album Not All Heroes Wear Capes. Produced by Metro Boomin and Tay Keith, the song is noted for 21 Savage's whispering vocals.

== Composition ==
"Don't Come Out the House" is a horrorcore song that finds 21 Savage rapping in a whisper flow which has been compared to the song "Wait (The Whisper Song)" by the Ying Yang Twins. He whisper-raps over Tay Keith-produced bass and drums, while returning to his standard voice when the instrumental switches to piano keys produced by Metro Boomin. 21 Savage raps about the brutality of his past life, growing up around poverty and violence, and giving a warning to his enemies.

== Critical reception ==
The song received generally positive reviews from critics. It has been regarded as arguably the best song from Not All Heroes Wear Capes. Sheldon Pearce of Pitchfork wrote, "Through half-whispered verses and spook-filled production, the duo again bring the chills, reanimating the corpses from 21's past ("All these bodies, I can't sleep at night, nigga") and threatening those who oppose him with a similar fate. Here, ASMR sensations heighten acts of violence, sending a tingle down the spine, as the mild euphoria his soft-spoken raps induce matches eerily with the dread in his words." Marcus Blackwell of HipHopDX described the song as the most menacing record on the album, writing that 21 Savage "drops all kinds of murderous bars over a hard-hitting Metro and Tay Keith concoction". Thomas Hobbs of Highsnobiety called it "one of the best rap songs of the year".

== Charts ==
Chart performance for "Don't Come Out the House"
Chart (2018)	Peak position
Canada Hot 100 (Billboard)	47
Ireland (IRMA)	66
New Zealand Hot Singles (RMNZ)	7
UK Singles (OCC)	80
US Billboard Hot 100	38
US Hot R&B/Hip-Hop Songs (Billboard)	18

== Certifications ==
Region	Certification	Certified units/sales
Australia (ARIA)	Gold	35,000^{‡}
Canada (Music Canada)	Platinum	80,000^{‡}
United States (RIAA)	Platinum	1,000,000^{‡}
^{‡} Sales+streaming figures based on certification alone.
