= Perfect Timing (Intro) =

2017 single by Nav and Metro Boomin

Single by Nav and Metro Boomin

from the album Perfect Timing
- Released: July 14, 2017
- Length: 2:57
- Label: XO; Republic
- Songwriters: Navraj Goraya; Leland Wayne; Joshua Luellen
- Producers: Metro Boomin; Southside

Nav singles chronology
"Myself" (2017)	"Perfect Timing (Intro)" / "Call Me" (2017)	"Wanted You" (2017)

Metro Boomin singles chronology
"No Complaints" (2017)	"Perfect Timing (Intro)" / "Call Me" (2017)	"Ric Flair Drip" (2017)

Music video
- "Perfect Timing (Intro)" on YouTube

"Perfect Timing (Intro)" is a song by Canadian rapper Nav and American record producer Metro Boomin. It is the title track and one of the dual singles from their collaborative mixtape Perfect Timing. The song was released for digital download on July 14, 2017, alongside "Call Me". The song was written by the artists and Southside, who produced the song with Metro Boomin.

== Music video ==
The music video for "Perfect Timing" was released on July 21, 2017 on Nav's Vevo account and was directed by Glenn Michael & Christo Anesti. As of August 2022, the video has surpassed over 6.8 million views.

== Track listing ==
Digital download
No.	Title	Length
1.	"Perfect Timing" (Intro)	2:57

== Charts ==
Chart performance
Chart (2017)	Peak position
Canada Hot 100 (Billboard)	89

== Certifications ==
Certifications
Region	Certification	Certified units/sales
Canada (Music Canada)	Gold	40,000^{‡}
^{‡} Sales+streaming figures based on certification alone.

== Release history ==
Release dates and formats
Region	Date	Format	Label(s)	Ref.
Various	July 14, 2017 (Note: Release as a single.)	Digital download	XO; Republic	
