= No Complaints =

Single by Metro Boomin featuring Offset and Drake

from the album Not All Heroes Wear Capes
- Released: June 23, 2017
- Genre: Hip hop; trap
- Length: 4:25
- Label: Boominati; Republic
- Songwriter(s): Leland Wayne; Kiari Cephus; Aubrey Graham
- Producer(s): Metro Boomin

Metro Boomin singles chronology
"No Heart" (2016)	"No Complaints" (2017)	"Perfect Timing (Intro)" (2017)

Offset singles chronology
"Water Leak" (2017)	"No Complaints" (2017)	"Wedding Crashers" (2017)

Drake singles chronology
"Signs" (2017)	"No Complaints" (2017)	"God's Plan" (2018)

"No Complaints" is the debut solo single by American record producer Metro Boomin featuring American rapper Offset and Canadian rapper Drake. The song was featured as a bonus track on Metro's debut solo studio album, Not All Heroes Wear Capes (2018). The song was released as a digital download on June 23, 2017, by Boominati Worldwide and Republic Records.

== Commercial performance ==
The song entered at number 71 on the US Billboard Hot 100.

== Charts ==
=== Weekly charts ===
Chart (2017)	Peak position
Canada (Canadian Hot 100)	51
New Zealand Heatseekers (RMNZ)	6
US Billboard Hot 100	71
US Hot R&B/Hip-Hop Songs (Billboard)	31
US R&B/Hip-Hop Airplay (Billboard)	44

=== Year-end charts ===
Chart (2017)	Position
US Hot R&B/Hip-Hop Songs (Billboard)	99

== Certifications ==
Region	Certification	Certified units/sales
Australia (ARIA)	Gold	35,000^{‡}
Canada (Music Canada)	2× Platinum	160,000^{‡}
New Zealand (RMNZ)	Gold	15,000^{‡}
United States (RIAA)	Platinum	1,000,000^{‡}
^{‡} Sales+streaming figures based on certification alone.

== Release history ==
Region	Date	Format	Label	Ref.
Worldwide	June 23, 2017	Digital download; streaming	Boominati; Republic	
