= Perfect Timing (mixtape) =

Mixtape by Nav and Metro Boomin
- Released: July 21, 2017
- Recorded: 2016–2017
- Genre: Trap
- Length: 55:25
- Labels: Boominati; XO; Republic
- Producers: Metro Boomin; Nav; Cubeatz; DannyBoyStyles; Pi'erre Bourne; Southside; Trouble Trouble

Nav chronology
| Nav (2017) | Perfect Timing (2017) | Reckless (2018) |

Metro Boomin chronology
| Perfect Timing (2017) | Without Warning (2017) |

Singles from Perfect Timing
- 1. "Perfect Timing (Intro)"/"Call Me" Released: July 14, 2017

Professional ratings
Review scores
| Source | Rating |
|---|---|
| HipHopDX | 2.5/5 stars |
| Pitchfork | 4.8/10 |
| Spectrum Culture | 2/5 stars |

Perfect Timing is a collaborative mixtape by Canadian rapper and record producer Nav and American record producer Metro Boomin. It was released on July 21, 2017, by Boominati Worldwide, XO, and Republic Records. The mixtape contains production from Metro Boomin, Nav, Pi'erre Bourne, and Southside among others, and features guest appearances from Lil Uzi Vert, Playboi Carti, Offset, 21 Savage, Nav's fellow labelmate Belly, and Gucci Mane. It was supported by two singles: "Perfect Timing (Intro)" and "Call Me". In 2023, Nav and Metro announced a sequel to the album simply called “Perfect Timing 2“

== Background ==
Before Perfect Timing was released, Nav and Metro Boomin both produced the former's song "Up", from his self-titled debut mixtape and first project (2017).

On July 21, 2017, the same day the mixtape was released, Nav sat down for an interview with Paul Thompson of Complex. He described it as "more serious" and it features instrumentals that are different from those of what Metro Boomin regularly produces. Explaining his decision to emotionally rap about women, he explained that "you don't know who's fake and who's real" and "especially with girls: they could do anything for me and there's still that kind of guard up".

== Release and promotion ==
Initially announced in early 2017, the artwork and release date was unveiled on July 12, 2017. Two days later, the songs "Perfect Timing (Intro)" and "Call Me" were released as singles on July 14, 2017.

== Commercial performance ==
Perfect Timing debuted at number 13 on the US Billboard 200 earning 30,000 album-equivalent units with 6,000 in pure album sales in its first week. In its second week, the album fell to number 24 on the chart selling 15,000 units, bringing its two-week total to 45,000 units. On September 8, 2020, the mixtape was certified gold by the Recording Industry Association of America (RIAA) for combined sales and album-equivalent units of over 500,000 units in the United States.

== Critical reception ==
Scott Glaysher of HipHopDX did not like Nav's vocals on any song from Perfect Timing, but he praised the instrumentals that were created by Metro Boomin and some other fellow record producers on some songs. Writing for Pitchfork, Jay Balfour said that the project shows that "Nav is empty as he ever was, lyrically especially" and the "brooding, soft-synthed trap" instrumentals created by Metro "would be in familiar and more capable hands if the guests were alone with them, but they aren’t enough of a saving grace". Spectrum Culture's Daniel Bromfield opined that Nav "has proved himself nothing more than Pandora filler, providing nothing but rap in a pinch" and Metro "should have should have blown this one up a little more" to make it more upbeat.

== Track listing ==
Credits adapted from Tidal.

Perfect Timing
| No. | Title | Writer(s) | Producer(s) | Length |
|---|---|---|---|---|
| 1. | "Perfect Timing (Intro)" | Navraj Goraya; Leland Wayne; Joshua Luellen | Metro Boomin; Southside | 2:57 |
| 2. | "I Don't Care" | Goraya; Wayne | Metro Boomin | 4:26 |
| 3. | "Hit" | Goraya; Wayne; Luellen | Metro Boomin; Southside | 2:50 |
| 4. | "ASAP Ferg" (featuring Lil Uzi Vert) | Goraya; Wayne; Symere Woods; Amir Esmailian | Metro Boomin; Nav | 4:17 |
| 5. | "Held Me Down" | Goraya; Wayne; Kevin Gomringer; Tim Gomringer | Metro Boomin; Nav; Cubeatz^{[a]} | 3:48 |
| 6. | "Minute" (featuring Playboi Carti and Offset) | Goraya; Wayne; Jordan Carter; Kiari Cephus; Jordan Jenks | Metro Boomin; Nav; Pi'erre Bourne | 4:25 |
| 7. | "Did You See Nav?" | Goraya; Wayne; K. Gomringer; T. Gomringer | Metro Boomin; Cubeatz^{[a]} | 3:37 |
| 8. | "Bring It Back" | Goraya; Wayne | Metro Boomin | 3:09 |
| 9. | "Both Sides" (featuring 21 Savage) | Goraya; Wayne; Shayaa Abraham-Joseph; Esmailian | Metro Boomin | 3:29 |
| 10. | "Call Me" | Goraya; Wayne; Esmailian | Metro Boomin | 3:35 |
| 11. | "You Know" (featuring Belly) | Goraya; Wayne; Ahmad Balshe | Metro Boomin | 3:29 |
| 12. | "Rich" | Goraya; Wayne | Metro Boomin; Nav | 3:47 |
| 13. | "Need Some" (featuring Gucci Mane) | Goraya; Wayne; Radric Davis; K. Gomringer; T. Gomringer; Esmailian | Metro Boomin; Cubeatz^{[a]} | 3:02 |
| 14. | "I Am" | Goraya; Wayne; Danny Schofield | Metro Boomin; Nav; DannyBoyStyles | 4:13 |
| 15. | "NavUziMetro#Pt2" (featuring Lil Uzi Vert) | Goraya; Wayne; Woods; Jordan Bacchus | Metro Boomin; Nav; Trouble Trouble | 4:21 |
| Total length: | | | | 55:25 |

Perfect Timing - CD Bonus Track
| No. | Title | Writer(s) | Producer(s) | Length |
|---|---|---|---|---|
| 16. | "Up" | Goraya; Leland Wayne | Nav; Metro Boomin | 3:20 |
| Total length: | | | | 59:45 |

Notes

- ^{^{^[a]}} signifies a co-producer
- "ASAP Ferg" is stylized as "A$AP Ferg"
- "Did You See Nav?" is stylized as "Did You See NAV?"
- "NavUziMetro#Pt2" is stylized in all-caps

== Personnel ==
Credits adapted from Tidal.

Performers

- Nav – primary artist
- Lil Uzi Vert – featured artist (tracks 4, 15)
- Offset – featured artist (track 6)
- Playboi Carti – featured artist (track 6)
- 21 Savage – featured artist (track 9)
- Belly – featured artist (track 11)
- Gucci Mane – featured artist (track 13)

Production

- Metro Boomin – producer (all tracks)
- Southside – producer (tracks 1, 3)
- Nav – producer (tracks 4, 5, 6, 12, 14, 15)
- Cubeatz – co-producer (tracks 5, 7, 13)
- Pi'erre Bourne – producer (track 6)
- DannyBoyStyles – producer (track 14)
- Trouble Trouble – co-producer (track 15)

Technical

- Joe LaPorta – mastering engineer (all tracks), mixer (tracks 1)
- Kuldeep Chudasama – recording engineer (tracks 1, 3, 7, 9, 10, 13)
- Tomi Fischer – assistant recording engineer (tracks 1, 3, 7, 9, 10, 13)
- Alex Tumay – mixer (tracks 1, 2, 11, 13)
- Danny Schofield – recording engineer (tracks 2)
- Raph Mesquita – assistant recording engineer (tracks 2, 15)
- Amadxus – assistant recording engineer (tracks 2, 15)
- Nav – mixer (tracks 3, 4, 8–10, 14), recording engineer (tracks 8, 14)
- Ethan Stevens – mixer (tracks 3–10, 12, 14, 15), recording engineer (tracks 5, 11, 12)
- Shin Kamiyama – recording engineer (tracks 4, 6, 11, 15)

== Charts ==
=== Weekly charts ===
| Chart (2017) | Peak position |
|---|---|
| Belgian Albums (Ultratop Flanders) | 127 |
| Canadian Albums (Billboard) | 7 |
| Dutch Albums (Album Top 100) | 60 |
| French Albums (SNEP) | 191 |
| New Zealand Heatseekers Albums (RMNZ) | 1 |
| UK Albums (Official Charts) | 61 |
| US Billboard 200 | 13 |
| US Top R&B/Hip-Hop Albums (Billboard) | 7 |

=== Year-end charts ===
| Chart (2017) | Position |
|---|---|
| US Billboard 200 | 184 |
| US Top R&B/Hip-Hop Albums (Billboard) | 58 |

== Certifications ==
| Region | Certification | Certified units/sales |
|---|---|---|
| Canada (Music Canada) | Platinum | 80,000^{‡} |
| United States (RIAA) | Gold | 500,000^{‡} |
^{‡} Sales+streaming figures based on certification alone.
