= My Dawg (21 Savage and Metro Boomin song) =

2020 song

Song by 21 Savage and Metro Boomin

from the album Savage Mode II
- Released: October 2, 2020
- Length: 3:02
- Label: Slaughter Gang; Epic; Boominati; Republic
- Songwriters: Shéyaa Bin Abraham-Joseph; Leland Wayne; Ahmar Bailey; Bernd Schoenhart
- Producers: Metro Boomin; Kid Hazel

Music video
- "My Dawg" on YouTube

"My Dawg" is a song by Atlanta-based rapper 21 Savage and American record producer Metro Boomin, released on October 2, 2020, as the tenth track off their collaborative album Savage Mode II. In the song, 21 Savage raps about his British origins, which is also reflected in the track's video.

== Composition and lyrics ==
As noted by NPR's Christina Lee, "My Dawg" is a "slow-motion thrill", with Metro Boomin's hi-hats and 21 Savage's threats starting "out of sync but come into lockstep when the snares kick in". The song finds 21 addressing criticisms of his UK citizenship, and throws warning shots at any opps who "keep talking that UK shit like I ain't got no AKs". In the song's video, he raps these lines while being surrounded by 18th century British soldiers. On the "hard-hitting" song, 21 also looks back on Nipsey Hussle, the street life, and his friend Larry who was killed in a pawnshop robbery.

== Music video ==
The song's official video was released on October 7, 2020, directed by Joe Weil. The visual opens with the duo arriving at a luxurious, closed-off estate, whereafter they are seen in front of a large fountain as tons of lights accentute their extravagant outfits; the fountain is later seen spewing blood. In and around the mansion, they are seen living lavish lifestyles with half-naked women parading around. In imagery reminiscent of the film Scarface, they conduct "shady" deals with questionable accomplices, along with having an actual dog chasing unwanted visitors off the property and making an example of them. 21 honors his British background, showing a painting that depicts him as a monarch. Revolt's Jon Powell noted, "They also utilize out-of-place fixtures like school lockers and eighteenth century era Redcoats to help bring Savage's non-fiction lyrics to life on-screen".

== Charts ==
| Chart (2020) | Peak position |
|---|---|
| Canada Hot 100 (Billboard) | 51 |
| US Billboard Hot 100 | 56 |
| US Hot R&B/Hip-Hop Songs (Billboard) | 25 |

== Certifications ==
Certifications for "My Dawg"
| Region | Certification | Certified units/sales |
|---|---|---|
| United States (RIAA) | Gold | 500,000^{‡} |
^{‡} Sales+streaming figures based on certification alone.
