= 21 Savage discography =

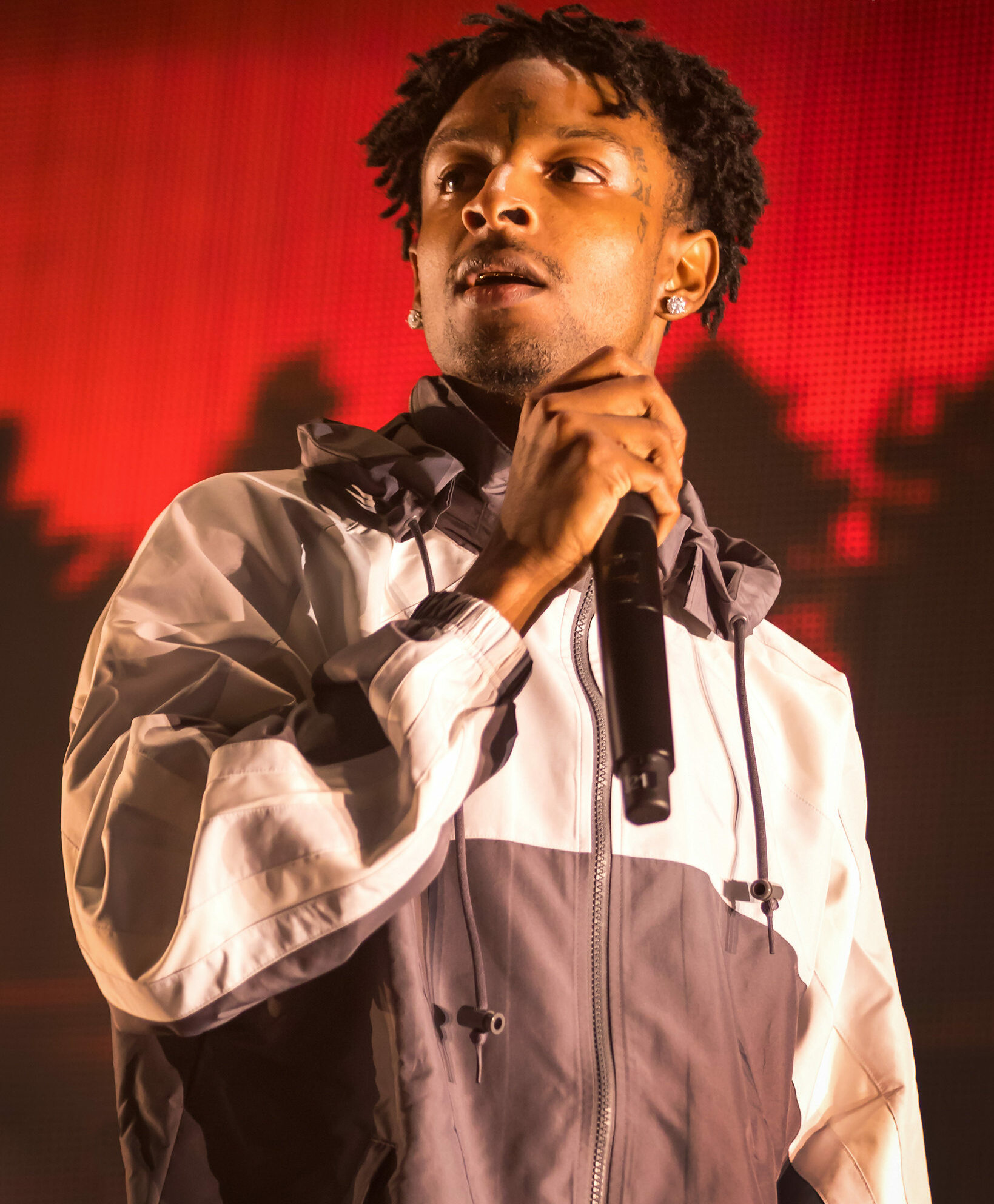
- 21 Savage performing in June 2018
- Studio albums: 4
- EPs: 3
- Remix albums: 5
- Singles: 33
- Music videos: 69
- Mixtapes: 3

The discography of 21 Savage, a British-American rapper, consists of four studio albums, three collaborative albums, three mixtapes, three extended plays, and 33 singles (including 15 as a featured artist). His first collaborative extended play with Metro Boomin, Savage Mode (2016), had reached at number 23 on the Billboard 200, marking his first project to chart. It also produced the Billboard Hot 100 top-40 single, "X" (featuring Future) and "No Heart". His debut studio album, Issa Album (2017), had peaked at number 2 on the US Billboard 200, and producing the top-20 single, "Bank Account", while his first collaborative studio album with Offset and Metro Boomin, Without Warning (2017), had peaked at number 4 on the US Billboard 200.

His second studio album, I Am > I Was (2018), debuted atop the US Billboard 200, serving as his first chart-topping album. It also produced the top-20 single, "A Lot". His second collaborative studio album with Metro Boomin, Savage Mode II (2020), serves as his second chart-topping album. It also produced the top-10 singles, "Runnin" and "Mr. Right Now" (featuring Drake). His third extended play, Spiral: From the Book of Saw Soundtrack (2021), a soundtrack from the film, Spiral (2021). Later that same day, he released a collaboration with J. Cole and Morray, "My Life", in which debuted at number 2 on the Hot 100, serving as his highest-charting single as a lead artist on the Hot 100. In 2022, he released a collaboration with the late King Von on the song, "Don't Play That", in which peaked at number 40 on the Hot 100. His third collaborative studio album with Drake, Her Loss (2022), debuted atop the US Billboard 200, serving as his third chart-topping album. It also produced three top-10 single, "Rich Flex", "Spin Bout U", and "Circo Loco", all these songs debuted at numbers 2, 5, and 8 on the Hot 100, respectively. The album also includes six more top-10 songs. Later that same year, he released a collaboration with Metro Boomin and the Weeknd on the song, "Creepin'", in which this song had reached at number 3 on the Hot 100 the following year.

His third studio album, American Dream (2024), debuted atop the Billboard 200, serving as his fourth chart-topping album. It also produced two top-ten singles, "Redrum" and "Née-Nah", with the latter being a collaboration with Travis Scott and Metro Boomin, both these songs had debuted at number 5 and 10, respectively. It also produced the top-20 single, "N.H.I.E." (a collaboration with Doja Cat), in which reached at number 19.

Savage has also received commercial success from songs that he would appear as a featured artist, starting with his appearance on Drake's single, "Sneakin'", in which reached at number 28 on the Billboard Hot 100; as well as Savage made a guest featured on Post Malone's single, "Rockstar", in which reached number one on the Hot 100, giving him his first chart-topping single. Later that same year, he appeared on Cardi B's single, "Bartier Cardi", in which reached at number 14 on the Hot 100. In 2021, he was featured, alongside G Herbo and Lil Durk on another version of Nardo Wick's single, "Who Want Smoke?", titled "Who Want Smoke??", with an extra question mark in the title, in which debuted at number 17 on the Hot 100. Later that same year, he appeared, alongside Project Pat, on Drake's single, "Knife Talk", in which reached at number 4 on the Hot 100. In 2022, Savage was featured, alongside Tyler, the Creator, on Pharrell Williams' single, "Cash In Cash Out", in which peaked at number 26 on the Hot 100. Later that same year, he was featured on Drake's single, "Jimmy Cooks", in which debuted atop the Hot 100, giving him his second chart-topping single.

== Albums ==
=== Studio albums ===
List of studio albums, with selected chart positions, sales figures and certifications
Title	Album details	Peak chart positions										Sales (Note: Sales figures for albums, EPs, and singles are pure sales that do not take equivalent units into account.)	Certifications
Title	Album details	US	US R&B/ HH	US Rap	AUS	CAN	FRA	IRE	NLD	NZ	UK	Sales	Certifications
Issa Album	Released: July 7, 2017; Label: Slaughter Gang, Epic; Format: CD, LP, cassette, digital download, streaming	2	2	2	42	8	106	—	—	27	42		RIAA: Platinum; IFPI DEN: Gold; MC: Platinum; RMNZ: Gold
I Am > I Was	Released: December 21, 2018; Label: Slaughter Gang, Epic; Format: CD, LP, cassette, digital download, streaming	1	1	1	30	3	—	30	5	23	33	US: 16,000 (Note: In 2019 the album sold 16,000)	RIAA: Platinum; BPI: Gold; IFPI DEN: Gold; MC: 2× Platinum; RMNZ: Platinum
American Dream	Released: January 12, 2024; Label: Slaughter Gang, Epic; Format: CD, LP, digital download, streaming	1	1	1	1	1	5	2	2	1	2	US: 14,678	RIAA: Platinum; BPI: Silver; MC: Platinum; RMNZ: Platinum
What Happened to the Streets?	Released: December 12, 2025; Label: Slaughter Gang, Epic; Format: Digital download, streaming	3	1	1	23	12	—	—	75	16	55	US: 25,000	

=== Collaborative albums ===
List of collaborative albums, with selected chart positions, sales figures and certifications
Title	Album details	Peak chart positions										Sales (Note: Sales figures for albums, EPs, and singles are pure sales that do not take equivalent units into account.)	Certifications
Title	Album details	US	US R&B/ HH	US Rap	AUS	CAN	FRA	IRE	NLD	NZ	UK	Sales	Certifications
Without Warning (with Offset and Metro Boomin)	Released: October 31, 2017; Label: Slaughter Gang, Boominati Worldwide, Quality Control, Epic, Republic, Capitol, Motown; Format: Digital download, streaming	4	2	1	39	5	76	—	24	15	41		BPI: Silver; RMNZ: Platinum
Savage Mode II (with Metro Boomin)	Released: October 2, 2020; Label: Slaughter Gang, Boominati Worldwide, Epic, Republic; Format: CD, LP, cassette, digital download, streaming	1	1	1	4	1	15	4	5	5	10		RIAA: 2× Platinum; BPI: Gold; MC: 2× Platinum; RMNZ: Platinum
Her Loss (with Drake)	Released: November 4, 2022; Label: OVO, Republic; Format: CD, digital download, streaming	1	1	1	2	1	10	2	2	2	1	US: 20,000 (Note: In 2023 the album sold 20,000 pure copies)	RIAA: 2× Platinum; ARIA: Gold; BPI: Gold; MC: 2× Platinum; RMNZ: Platinum

== Extended plays ==
List of extended plays, with selected chart positions and certifications
Title	EP details	Peak chart positions			Certifications
Title	EP details	US	US R&B/ HH	US Rap	Certifications
Free Guwop (with Sonny Digital)	Released: July 2, 2015; Label: Self-released; Format: Digital download	—	—	—	
Savage Mode (with Metro Boomin)	Released: July 15, 2016; Label: Slaughter Gang, RED; Format: LP, digital download	23	9	7	RIAA: Gold; RMNZ: Gold
Spiral: From the Book of Saw Soundtrack	Released: May 14, 2021; Label: Slaughter Gang, Epic; Format: Digital download, streaming	127	—	—	
"—" denotes a recording that did not chart or was not released in that territory.

== Mixtapes ==
Title	Mixtape details
The Slaughter Tape	Released: May 15, 2015; Label: Self-released; Format: Digital download, streaming
Slaughter King	Released: December 1, 2015; Label: Self-released; Format: Digital download, streaming

== Singles ==
=== As lead artist ===
List of singles as a lead artist, with selected chart positions
Title	Year	Peak chart positions										Certifications	Album
Title	Year	US	US R&B/HH	US Rap	AUS	CAN	FRA	IRE	NZ	UK	WW	Certifications	Album
"Picky"	2014	—	—	—	—	—	—	—	—	—	—		The Slaughter Tape
"One Foot"	2016	—	—	—	—	—	—	—	—	—	—		Free Guwop
"Red Opps"	2016	74	31	25	—	—	—	—	—	—	—	RIAA: Platinum	Free Guwop
"X" (with Metro Boomin featuring Future)	2016	36	12	10	—	66	—	—	—	—	—	RIAA: 3× Platinum; BPI: Silver; MC: 2× Platinum; RMNZ: Platinum	Savage Mode
"No Heart" (with Metro Boomin)	2016	43	17	12	—	79	—	—	—	—	—	RIAA: 2× Platinum; BPI: Silver; MC: Platinum; RMNZ: Platinum	Savage Mode
"Bank Account"	2017	12	5	4	55	16	—	63	39	41	—	RIAA: 6× Platinum; ARIA: 2× Platinum; BPI: Platinum; MC: 4× Platinum; RMNZ: 3× Platinum	Issa Album
"Cocky" (with ASAP Rocky and Gucci Mane featuring London on da Track)	2018	— (Note: "Cocky" did not enter the Billboard Hot 100, but peaked at number 17 on the Bubbling Under Hot 100 Singles chart.)	— (Note: "Cocky" did not enter the Hot R&B/Hip-Hop Songs chart, but peaked at number five on the Bubbling Under R&B/Hip-Hop Singles chart.)	—	—	83	—	—	—	—	—		The Uncle Drew Motion Picture Soundtrack
"A Lot" (featuring J. Cole)	2019	12	5	5	61	21	—	25	26	29	—	RIAA: 5× Platinum; ARIA: Gold; BPI: Platinum; MC: Platinum; RMNZ: 4× Platinum	I Am > I Was
"Monster" (featuring Childish Gambino)	2019	73	28	—	97	56	—	—	4	—	—	RIAA: Platinum; MC: Platinum	I Am > I Was
"Immortal"	2019	55	25	21	—	58	—	—	— (Note: "Immortal" did not enter the NZ Top 40 Singles Chart, but peaked at number 15 on the NZ Hot Singles Chart.)	—	—	RIAA: 2× Platinum; RMNZ: Gold	Non-album singles
"Secret" (featuring Summer Walker)	2020	—	—	—	—	—	—	—	— (Note: "Secret" did not enter the NZ Top 40 Singles Chart, but peaked at number 16 on the NZ Hot Singles Chart.)	—	—	RIAA: Gold	Non-album singles
"Runnin" (with Metro Boomin)	2020	9	5	5	52	13	115	28	— (Note: "Runnin" did not enter the NZ Top 40 Singles Chart, but peaked at number five on the NZ Hot Singles Chart.)	43	—	RIAA: 5× Platinum; MC: Gold; BPI: Silver; RMNZ: 2× Platinum	Savage Mode II
"Mr. Right Now" (with Metro Boomin featuring Drake)	2020	10	6	6	39	9	125	23	— (Note: "Mr. Right Now" did not enter the NZ Top 40 Singles Chart, but peaked at number three on the NZ Hot Singles Chart.)	28	—	RIAA: 2× Platinum; MC: Gold; RMNZ: Gold	Savage Mode II
"Spiral"	2021	—	—	—	—	—	—	—	— (Note: "Spiral" did not enter the NZ Top 40 Singles Chart, but peaked at number 23 on the NZ Hot Singles Chart.)	—	—		Spiral: From the Book of Saw
"My Life" (with J. Cole and Morray)	2021	2	1	1	11	8	—	12	5	13	4	RIAA: Platinum; ARIA: Gold; BPI: Silver; RMNZ: Platinum; SNEP: Gold	The Off-Season
"Betrayed"	2021	—	—	—	—	—	—	—	—	—	—		Gully
"Lazy Susan" (with Rich Brian featuring Warren Hue and MaSiWei)	2021	—	—	—	—	—	—	—	—	—	—		Shang-Chi and the Legend of the Ten Rings: The Album
"Knife Talk" (with Drake featuring Project Pat)	2021	4	2	2	13	6	83	55	14	87	6	ARIA: 2× Platinum; BPI: Gold; RIAA: 5× Platinum; RMNZ: 2× Platinum	Certified Lover Boy
"Don't Play That" (with King Von)	2022	40	11	7	—	45	—	—	— (Note: "Don't Play That" did not enter the NZ Top 40 Singles Chart, but peaked at number 14 on the NZ Hot Singles Chart.)	—	59	RIAA: Gold	What It Means to Be King
"Peru (Remix)" (with Fireboy DML and Blxst)	2022	—	—	—	—	—	—	—	—	—	—		Non-album singles
"Run" (with YG and Tyga featuring Bia)	2022	—	—	—	—	—	—	—	— (Note: "New Money" did not enter the NZ Top 40 Singles Chart, but peaked at number 14 on the NZ Hot Singles Chart.)	—	—		Non-album singles
"New Money" (with Calvin Harris)	2022	—	—	—	—	—	—	—	— (Note: "New Money" did not enter the NZ Top 40 Singles Chart, but peaked at number 14 on the NZ Hot Singles Chart.)	—	—		Funk Wav Bounces Vol. 2
"Slide (Remix)" (with Madmarcc)	2022	—	—	—	—	—	—	—	—	—	—		Non-album single
"Rich Flex" (with Drake)	2022	2	1	1	3	1	74	2	2	3	1	RIAA: 5× Platinum; ARIA: 3× Platinum; BPI: Platinum; RMNZ: 2× Platinum	Her Loss
"Circo Loco" (with Drake)	2022	8	7	7	9	5	126	7	35	7	8	ARIA: Platinum; BPI: Silver; RMNZ: Gold	Her Loss
"Spin Bout U" (with Drake)	2022	5	4	4	55	9	150	—	—	— (Note: "Spin Bout U" did not enter the UK Singles Chart, as chart rules only allow three songs per artist to chart within the top one hundred at a time, but peaked at number 16 on the UK Streaming Chart.)	7	ARIA: Platinum; BPI: Silver; MC: 2× Platinum; RMNZ: Platinum	Her Loss
"One Mic, One Gun" (with Nas)	2022	—	—	—	—	—	—	—	—	—	—		Magic 2
"Creepin'" (with Metro Boomin and the Weeknd)	2022	3	1	—	8	1	8	8	6	7	3	RIAA: 2× Platinum; ARIA: 4× Platinum; BPI: Platinum; MC: 3× Platinum; RMNZ: 2× Platinum; SNEP: Diamond	Heroes & Villains
"Good Good" (with Usher and Summer Walker)	2023	25	7	—	—	—	—	—	— (Note: "Good Good" did not enter the NZ Top 40 Singles Chart, but peaked at number seven on the NZ Hot Singles Chart.)	—	—	RMNZ: Gold	Coming Home
"Call Me Revenge" (with D4vd)	2023	—	—	—	—	—	—	—	—	—	—		Call of Duty: Modern Warfare III
"Redrum"	2024	5	2	2	16	7	88	15	11	11	5	RIAA: 3× Platinum; ARIA: Platinum; BPI: Silver; MC: 3× Platinum; RMNZ: Platinum	American Dream
"N.H.I.E." (with Doja Cat)	2024	19	9	7	51	15	95	39	37	27	19	RIAA: Gold; MC: Gold	American Dream
"Née-Nah" (with Travis Scott and Metro Boomin)	2024	10	5	4	34	8	108	27	25	23	8	RIAA: Platinum; MC: Platinum; RMNZ: Gold	American Dream
"Prove It" (with Summer Walker)	2024	43	19	16	—	41	—	—	— (Note: "Prove It" did not enter the NZ Top 40 Singles Chart, but peaked at number 19 on the NZ Hot Singles Chart.)	—	65	RIAA: Platinum; MC: Gold; RMNZ: Platinum	American Dream
"GBP" (with Central Cee)	2025	81	21	15	36	28	—	26	20	6	43	BPI: Silver; MC: Gold; RMNZ: Gold	Can't Rush Greatness
"Mr. Recoup" (with Drake)	2026	51	4	2	—	44	—	—	— (Note: "Mr. Recoup" did not enter the NZ Top 40 Singles Chart, but peaked at number 2 on the NZ Hot Singles Chart.)	—	77		What Happened to the Streets?
"WTF Goin" (with Belly Gang Kushington)	2026	43	6	3	—	—	—	—	— (Note: "WTF Goin" did not enter the NZ Top 40 Singles Chart, but peaked at number 39 on the NZ Hot Singles Chart.)	—	—		TBA
"—" denotes a recording that did not chart or was not released in that territory.

=== As featured artist ===
List of singles as featured artist, with selected chart positions, showing year released and album name
Title	Year	Peak chart positions										Certifications	Album
Title	Year	US	US R&B/HH	US Rap	AUS	CAN	FRA	IRE	NZ	UK	WW	Certifications	Album
"Did Dat" (MobSquad Nard featuring 21 Savage and 1200 Yak)	2016	—	—	—	—	—	—	—	—	—	—		Everything Clean, But da Ashtray
"Lit" (DJ Scream featuring 21 Savage, Juicy J, and Young Dolph)	2016	—	—	—	—	—	—	—	—	—	—		Non-album singles
"Sneakin'" (Drake featuring 21 Savage)	2016	28	8	7	81	20	180	80	—	52	—	RIAA: Platinum; ARIA: Gold; BPI: Silver	Non-album singles
"Gucci on My" (Mike Will Made It featuring 21 Savage, YG, and Migos)	2017	— (Note: "Gucci On My" did not enter the Billboard Hot 100, but peaked at number 10 on the Bubbling Under Hot 100 Singles chart.)	41	—	—	—	—	—	—	—	—		Ransom 2
"Rockstar" (Post Malone featuring 21 Savage)	2017	1	1	1	1	1	5	1	1	1	—	RIAA: Diamond; ARIA: 14× Platinum; BPI: 4× Platinum; IFPI DEN: 2× Platinum; MC: Diamond; RMNZ: 9× Platinum	Beerbongs & Bentleys
"No Flag" (London on da Track featuring Nicki Minaj, 21 Savage, and Offset)	2017	—	—	—	—	—	—	—	—	—	—		Non-album single
"Pull Up N Wreck" (Big Sean and Metro Boomin featuring 21 Savage)	2017	80	39	—	—	82	—	—	—	—	—		Double or Nothing
"Crisis" (Rich Brian featuring 21 Savage)	2017	—	—	—	—	—	—	—	—	—	—		Non-album singles
"Krippy Kush (Remix)" (Farruko, Bad Bunny, and Nicki Minaj featuring 21 Savage and Rvssian)	2017	75	—	—	—	—	—	—	—	—	—		Non-album singles
"Bartier Cardi" (Cardi B featuring 21 Savage)	2017	14	7	7	77	23	91	51	— (Note: "Bartier Cardi" did not enter the NZ Top 40 Singles Chart, but peaked at number one on the NZ Hot Singles Chart.)	40	—	RIAA: 3× Platinum; BPI: Silver; MC: 2× Platinum; RMNZ: Platinum	Invasion of Privacy
"Rover 2.0" (BlocBoy JB featuring 21 Savage)	2018	— (Note: "Rover 2.0" did not enter the Billboard Hot 100, but peaked at number two on the Bubbling Under Hot 100 Singles chart.)	49	—	—	—	—	—	—	—	—		Simi
"Deal" (Casino featuring 21 Savage)	2018	—	—	—	—	—	—	—	—	—	—		Disrespectful
"Outstanding" (SahBabii featuring 21 Savage)	2018	—	—	—	—	—	—	—	—	—	—		Non-album singles
"Since When" (Young Nudy featuring 21 Savage)	2018	—	—	—	—	—	—	—	—	—	—		Non-album singles
"Floating" (Schoolboy Q featuring 21 Savage)	2019	67	25	22	—	56	—	—	—	—	—	RMNZ: Gold	Crash Talk
"Enzo" (DJ Snake and Sheck Wes featuring Offset, 21 Savage, and Gucci Mane)	2019	—	—	—	—	—	—	—	—	—	—		Carte Blanche
"Focus" (Bazzi featuring 21 Savage)	2019	— (Note: "Focus" did not enter the Billboard Hot 100, but peaked at number twenty five on the Bubbling Under Hot 100 Singles chart.)	—	—	—	—	—	—	—	—	—	MC: Gold; RMNZ: Gold	Soul Searching
"100 Bands" (Mustard featuring Quavo, 21 Savage, Meek Mill, and YG)	2019	—	—	—	—	—	—	—	—	—	—		Perfect Ten
"Motivation (Savage Remix)" (Normani featuring 21 Savage)	2019	—	—	—	—	—	—	—	—	—	—		Non-album single
"Show Me Love" (Remix) (Alicia Keys featuring Miguel and 21 Savage)	2019	—	—	—	—	—	—	—	—	—	—		Non-album single
"Opp Stoppa" (YBN Nahmir featuring 21 Savage)	2021	78	29	23	—	72	—	—	—	—	—		Visionland
"Let It Go" (DJ Khaled featuring Justin Bieber and 21 Savage)	2021	54	25	19	—	28	—	53	— (Note: "Let It Go" did not enter the NZ Top 40 Singles Chart, but peaked at number eight on the NZ Hot Singles Chart.)	—	49	RIAA: Gold	Khaled Khaled
"Number 2" (KSI featuring Future and 21 Savage)	2021	—	—	—	—	—	—	—	—	—	—		All Over the Place
"Who Want Smoke??" (Nardo Wick featuring G Herbo, Lil Durk, and 21 Savage)	2021	17	5	3	—	41	—	—	— (Note: "Who Want Smoke??" did not enter the NZ Top 40 Singles Chart, but peaked at number 15 on the NZ Hot Singles Chart.)	—	37		Who Is Nardo Wick?
"Outlawz" (Rick Ross featuring Jazmine Sullivan and 21 Savage)	2021	— (Note: "Outlawz" did not enter the Billboard Hot 100, but peaked at number 13 on the Bubbling Under Hot 100 Singles chart.)	—	—	—	—	—	—	—	—	—		Richer Than I Ever Been
"Surround Sound" (JID featuring 21 Savage and Baby Tate)	2022	40	13	10	52	27	—	45	— (Note: "Surround Sound" did not enter the NZ Top 40 Singles Chart, but peaked at number six on the NZ Hot Singles Chart.)	35	57	ARIA: Platinum; RIAA: Platinum; BPI: Gold; RMNZ: 2× Platinum	The Forever Story
"Wheelie" (Latto featuring 21 Savage)	2022	— (Note: "Wheelie" did not enter the Billboard Hot 100, but peaked at number 14 on the Bubbling Under Hot 100 Singles chart.)	—	—	—	—	—	—	—	—	—		777
"Cash In Cash Out" (Pharrell Williams featuring 21 Savage and Tyler, the Creator)	2022	26	5	4	—	33	—	—	— (Note: "Cash In Cash Out" did not enter the NZ Top 40 Singles Chart, but peaked at number four on the NZ Hot Singles Chart.)	73	41	RIAA: Platinum	Non-album single
"Jimmy Cooks" (Drake featuring 21 Savage)	2022	1	1	1	4	1	98	9	3	7	3	RIAA: 3× Platinum; ARIA: 4× Platinum; BPI: Platinum; RMNZ: 3× Platinum	Honestly, Nevermind
"Slime-U-Out" (Shy Glizzy featuring 21 Savage)	2022	—	—	—	—	—	—	—	—	—	—		Flowers
"06 Gucci" (Gucci Mane featuring DaBaby and 21 Savage)	2023	— (Note: "06 Gucci" did not enter the Billboard Hot 100, but peaked at number 21 on the Bubbling Under Hot 100 Singles chart.)	42	—	—	—	—	—	—	—	—		Breath of Fresh Air
"Peaches & Eggplants" (Young Nudy featuring 21 Savage)	2023	33	7	6	—	93	—	—	—	—	148	RIAA: Platinum; RMNZ: Gold	Gumbo
"Sittin' on Top of the World" (Burna Boy featuring 21 Savage)	2023	—	—	—	—	—	—	—	— (Note: "Sittin' on Top of the World" did not enter the NZ Top 40 Singles Chart, but peaked at number 27 on the NZ Hot Singles Chart.)	—	—		I Told Them...
"Both" (Tiësto and Bia featuring 21 Savage)	2023	—	—	—	—	—	—	—	—	—	—		Non-album single
"Another One of Me" (Diddy, the Weeknd, and French Montana featuring 21 Savage)	2023	87	34	—	—	83	—	—	— (Note: "Another One of Me" did not enter the NZ Top 40 Singles Chart, but peaked at number 11 on the NZ Hot Singles Chart.)	87	167		The Love Album: Off the Grid
"—" denotes a recording that did not chart or was not released in that territory.

== Other charted and certified songs ==
List of songs, with selected chart positions, showing year released and album name
Title	Year	Peak chart positions										Certifications	Album
Title	Year	US	US R&B/HH	US Rap	AUS	CAN	FRA	IRE	NZ	UK	WW	Certifications	Album
"Ocean Drive" (with Metro Boomin)	2016	—	—	—	—	—	—	—	—	—	—	RIAA: Gold	Savage Mode
"Outside" (Travis Scott featuring 21 Savage)	2016	—	— (Note: "Outside" did not enter the Hot R&B/Hip-Hop Songs chart, but peaked at number five on the Bubbling Under R&B/Hip-Hop Singles chart.)	—	—	—	—	—	—	—	—	RIAA: Gold; MC: Gold	Birds in the Trap Sing McKnight
"Offended" (Meek Mill featuring Young Thug and 21 Savage)	2016	70	29	22	—	100	—	—	—	—	—		DC4
"Iced Out My Arms" (DJ Khaled featuring Future, Migos, 21 Savage, and T.I.)	2017	— (Note: "Iced Out My Arms" did not enter the Billboard Hot 100, but peaked at number five on the Bubbling Under Hot 100 Singles chart.)	— (Note: "Iced Out My Arms" did not enter the Hot R&B/Hip-Hop Songs chart, but peaked at number two on the Bubbling Under R&B/Hip-Hop Singles chart.)	—	—	—	—	—	—	—	—		Grateful
"Famous"	2017	94	41	—	—	77	—	—	—	—	—	RIAA: Gold	Issa Album
"Numb"	2017	— (Note: "Numb" did not enter the Billboard Hot 100, but peaked at number two on the Bubbling Under Hot 100 Singles chart.)	50	—	—	—	—	—	—	—	—	RIAA: Platinum; MC: Gold	Issa Album
"Bad Business"	2017	— (Note: "Bad Business" did not enter the Billboard Hot 100, but peaked at number three on the Bubbling Under Hot 100 Singles chart.)	— (Note: "Bad Business" did not enter the Hot R&B/Hip-Hop Songs chart, but peaked at number one on the Bubbling Under R&B/Hip-Hop Singles chart.)	—	—	—	—	—	—	—	—	RIAA: Gold	Issa Album
"Close My Eyes"	2017	— (Note: "Close My Eyes" did not enter the Billboard Hot 100, but peaked at number four on the Bubbling Under Hot 100 Singles chart.)	— (Note: "Close My Eyes" did not enter the Hot R&B/Hip-Hop Songs chart, but peaked at number two on the Bubbling Under R&B/Hip-Hop Singles chart.)	—	—	—	—	—	—	—	—	RIAA: Gold	Issa Album
"FaceTime"	2017	— (Note: "FaceTime" did not enter the Billboard Hot 100, but peaked at number 8 on the Bubbling Under Hot 100 Singles chart.)	— (Note: "FaceTime" did not enter the Hot R&B/Hip-Hop Songs chart, but peaked at number four on the Bubbling Under R&B/Hip-Hop Singles chart.)	—	—	—	—	—	—	—	—	RIAA: Gold	Issa Album
"Baby Girl"	2017	— (Note: "Baby Girl" did not enter the Billboard Hot 100, but peaked at number 12 on the Bubbling Under Hot 100 Singles chart.)	— (Note: "Baby Girl" did not enter the Hot R&B/Hip-Hop Songs chart, but peaked at number five on the Bubbling Under R&B/Hip-Hop Singles chart.)	—	—	—	—	—	—	—	—		Issa Album
"Thug Life"	2017	— (Note: "Thug Life" did not enter the Billboard Hot 100, but peaked at number 16 on the Bubbling Under Hot 100 Singles chart.)	— (Note: "Thug Life" did not enter the Hot R&B/Hip-Hop Songs chart, but peaked at number six on the Bubbling Under R&B/Hip-Hop Singles chart.)	—	—	—	—	—	—	—	—	RIAA: Gold	Issa Album
"Whole Lot"	2017	— (Note: "Whole Lot" did not enter the Billboard Hot 100, but peaked at number 23 on the Bubbling Under Hot 100 Singles chart.)	— (Note: "Whole Lot" did not enter the Hot R&B/Hip-Hop Songs chart, but peaked at number seven on the Bubbling Under R&B/Hip-Hop Singles chart.)	—	—	—	—	—	—	—	—	RIAA: Gold	Issa Album
"Nothin New"	2017	— (Note: "Nothin New" did not enter the Billboard Hot 100, but peaked at number nine on the Bubbling Under Hot 100 Singles chart.)	— (Note: "Nothin New" did not enter the Hot R&B/Hip-Hop Songs chart, but peaked at number one on the Bubbling Under R&B/Hip-Hop Singles chart.)	—	—	—	—	—	—	—	—		Issa Album
"7 Min Freestyle"	2017	—	—	—	—	—	—	—	—	—	—	RIAA: Gold	Issa Album
"Undefeated" (A Boogie wit da Hoodie featuring 21 Savage)	2017	84	37	—	—	—	—	—	—	—	—	RIAA: Gold	The Bigger Artist
"Ghostface Killers" (with Offset and Metro Boomin featuring Travis Scott)	2017	35	14	13	69	14	—	—	— (Note: "Ghostface Killers" did not enter the NZ Top 40 Singles Chart, but peaked at number five on the NZ Heatseeker Singles Chart.)	60	—	RIAA: 2× Platinum; ARIA: Gold; BPI: Silver; MC: Platinum; RMNZ: Platinum	Without Warning
"Rap Saved Me" (with Offset and Metro Boomin featuring Quavo)	2017	64	26	21	—	46	—	—	—	—	—	RIAA: Platinum	Without Warning
"My Choppa Hate Niggas" (with Metro Boomin)	2017	73	30	—	—	57	—	—	—	—	—	RIAA: Platinum	Without Warning
"Mad Stalkers" (with Offset and Metro Boomin)	2017	99	42	—	—	77	—	—	—	—	—	RIAA: Gold	Without Warning
"Disrespectful" (with Offset and Metro Boomin)	2017	— (Note: "Disrespectful" did not enter the Billboard Hot 100, but peaked at number four on the Bubbling Under Hot 100 Singles chart.)	48	—	—	87	—	—	—	—	—	RIAA: Gold	Without Warning
"Run Up the Racks" (with Metro Boomin)	2017	— (Note: "Run Up the Racks" did not enter the Billboard Hot 100, but peaked at number 15 on the Bubbling Under Hot 100 Singles chart.)	— (Note: "Run Up the Racks" did not enter the Hot R&B/Hip-Hop Songs chart, but peaked at number six on the Bubbling Under R&B/Hip-Hop Singles chart.)	—	—	95	—	—	—	—	—		Without Warning
"Still Serving" (with Offset and Metro Boomin)	2017	— (Note: "Still Serving" did not enter the Billboard Hot 100, but peaked at number 14 on the Bubbling Under Hot 100 Singles chart.)	— (Note: "Still Serving" did not enter the Hot R&B/Hip-Hop Songs chart, but peaked at number 10 on the Bubbling Under R&B/Hip-Hop Singles chart.)	—	—	—	—	—	—	—	—	RIAA: Gold	Without Warning
"BBO (Bad Bitches Only)" (Migos featuring 21 Savage)	2018	48	24	22	—	52	—	—	—	—	—		Culture II
"Clout" (Ty Dolla Sign featuring 21 Savage)	2018	—	—	—	—	—	—	—	—	—	—	RIAA: Gold	Beach House 3
"NC-17" (Travis Scott featuring 21 Savage)	2018	41	25	22	—	40	—	—	—	— (Note: "NC-17" did not enter the UK Singles Chart, as chart rules only allow three songs per artist to chart within the top one hundred at a time, but peaked at number 93 on the UK Streaming Chart.)	—	RIAA: Platinum; MC: Platinum	Astroworld
"Pass Out" (Quavo featuring 21 Savage)	2018	61	29	—	—	56	—	—	—	—	—		Quavo Huncho
"Don't Come Out the House" (Metro Boomin featuring 21 Savage)	2018	38	18	18	—	47	—	66	— (Note: "Don't Come Out the House" did not enter the NZ Top 40 Singles Chart, but peaked at number seven on the NZ Hot Singles Chart.)	80	—	RIAA: Platinum; ARIA: Gold; MC: Gold	Not All Heroes Wear Capes
"10 Freaky Girls" (Metro Boomin featuring 21 Savage)	2018	42	20	20	—	39	—	58	— (Note: "10 Freaky Girls" did not enter the NZ Top 40 Singles Chart, but peaked at number five on the NZ Hot Singles Chart.)	69	—	RIAA: Platinum; ARIA: 2× Platinum; BPI: Gold; MC: 2× Platinum; RMNZ: Platinum	Not All Heroes Wear Capes
"No More" (Metro Boomin featuring Travis Scott, Kodak Black, and 21 Savage)	2018	79	40	—	—	71	—	—	—	—	—	MC: Gold	Not All Heroes Wear Capes
"Pay You Back" (Meek Mill featuring 21 Savage)	2018	78	43	—	—	—	—	—	—	—	—		Championships
"Break da Law"	2018	70	26	24	—	82	—	—	—	—	—	RIAA: Gold	I Am > I Was
"A&T"	2018	— (Note: "A&T" did not enter the Billboard Hot 100, but peaked at number two on the Bubbling Under Hot 100 chart.)	45	—	—	—	—	—	—	—	—	RIAA: Gold	I Am > I Was
"Out for the Night"	2018	88	34	—	—	—	—	—	—	—	—	RIAA: Gold	I Am > I Was
"Gun Smoke"	2018	93	36	—	—	—	—	—	—	—	—	RIAA: Gold	I Am > I Was
"1.5"	2018	86	33	—	—	96	—	—	—	—	—	RIAA: Gold	I Am > I Was
"All My Friends"	2018	67	23	21	—	73	—	—	6	—	—	RIAA: Platinum	I Am > I Was
"Can't Leave Without It"	2018	58	18	16	—	70	—	—	12	—	—	RIAA: 2× Platinum; BPI: Silver; MC: Gold; RMNZ: Gold	I Am > I Was
"ASMR"	2018	95	38	—	—	94	—	—	—	—	—	RIAA: Gold	I Am > I Was
"Ball w/o You"	2018	— (Note: "Ball w/o You" did not enter the Billboard Hot 100, but peaked at number one on the Bubbling Under Hot 100 chart.)	41	—	—	—	—	—	—	—	—	RIAA: 4× Platinum; BPI: Gold; RMNZ: 2× Platinum	I Am > I Was
"Good Day"	2018	— (Note: "Good Day" did not enter the Billboard Hot 100, but peaked at number 25 on the Bubbling Under Hot 100 chart.)	— (Note: "Good Day" did not enter the Hot R&B/Hip-Hop Songs chart, but peaked at number six on the Bubbling Under R&B/Hip-Hop Singles chart.)	—	—	—	—	—	—	—	—		I Am > I Was
"Pad Lock"	2018	— (Note: "Pad Lock" did not enter the Billboard Hot 100, but peaked at number 16 on the Bubbling Under Hot 100 chart.)	— (Note: "Pad Lock" did not enter the Hot R&B/Hip-Hop Songs chart, but peaked at number two on the Bubbling Under R&B/Hip-Hop Singles chart.)	—	—	—	—	—	—	—	—	RIAA: Gold	I Am > I Was
"Letter 2 My Momma"	2018	—	— (Note: "Letter 2 My Momma" did not enter the Hot R&B/Hip-Hop Songs chart, but peaked at number seven on the Bubbling Under R&B/Hip-Hop Singles chart.)	—	—	—	—	—	—	—	—		I Am > I Was
"4L"	2018	— (Note: "4L" did not enter the Billboard Hot 100, but peaked at number 18 on the Bubbling Under Hot 100 chart.)	— (Note: "4L" did not enter the Hot R&B/Hip-Hop Songs chart, but peaked at number three on the Bubbling Under R&B/Hip-Hop Singles chart.)	—	—	—	—	—	—	—	—	RIAA: Gold	I Am > I Was
"Out for the Night, Pt. 2"	2018	—	—	—	—	—	—	—	—	—	—	RIAA: Gold	I Am > I Was
"Legacy" (Offset featuring Travis Scott and 21 Savage)	2019	49	22	21	—	51	—	— (Note: "Legacy" did not enter the NZ Top 40 Singles Chart, but peaked at number eight on the NZ Hot Singles Chart.)	—	—			Father of 4
"Floating" (Schoolboy Q featuring 21 Savage)	2019	67	25	22	—	56	—	—	—	—	—	RIAA: Platinum	Crash Talk
"Wish Wish" (DJ Khaled featuring Cardi B and 21 Savage)	2019	19	8	6	88	28	129	—	— (Note: "Wish Wish" did not enter the NZ Top 40 Singles Chart, but peaked at number 14 on the NZ Hot Singles Chart.)	81	—	RIAA: Platinum; ARIA: Gold; MC: Gold	Father of Asahd
"I'm Scared" (Young Thug featuring 21 Savage and Doe Boy)	2019	— (Note: "I'm Scared" did not enter the Billboard Hot 100, but peaked at number 21 on the Bubbling Under Hot 100 Singles chart.)	— (Note: "I'm Scared" did not enter the Billboard Hot R&B/Hip-Hop Songs chart, but peaked at number one on the Billboard Bubbling Under R&B/Hip-Hop Singles chart.)	—	—	—	—	—	—	—	—		So Much Fun
"Yessirskiii" (with Lil Uzi Vert)	2020	26	14	10	—	88	—	— (Note: "Yessirskiii" did not enter the NZ Top 40 Singles Chart, but peaked at number 11 on the NZ Hot Singles Chart.)	—	—	—	RIAA: Platinum	Lil Uzi Vert vs. the World 2
"Glock in My Lap" (with Metro Boomin)	2020	19	11	10	—	28	—	46	— (Note: "Glock in My Lap" did not enter the NZ Top 40 Singles Chart, but peaked at number 10 on the NZ Hot Singles Chart.)	—	22	RIAA: 4× Platinum; BPI: Gold; RMNZ: Platinum	Savage Mode II
"Rich Nigga Shit" (with Metro Boomin featuring Young Thug)	2020	26	13	12	—	33	—	—	— (Note: "Rich Nigga Shit" did not enter the NZ Top 40 Singles Chart, but peaked at number seven on the NZ Hot Singles Chart.)	54	—	RIAA: 3× Platinum; BPI: Silver; RMNZ: Platinum	Savage Mode II
"Slidin" (with Metro Boomin)	2020	32	15	14	—	39	—	—	—	—	—	RIAA: Platinum	Savage Mode II
"Many Men" (with Metro Boomin)	2020	33	16	15	—	34	—	—	—	—	—	RIAA: Platinum	Savage Mode II
"Snitches & Rats" (with Metro Boomin featuring Young Nudy)	2020	61	28	—	—	72	—	—	—	—	71		Savage Mode II
"My Dawg" (with Metro Boomin)	2020	56	25	23	—	51	—	—	—	—	63	RIAA: Gold	Savage Mode II
"Steppin on Niggas" (with Metro Boomin)	2020	74	31	—	—	90	—	—	—	—	99		Savage Mode II
"Brand New Draco" (with Metro Boomin)	2020	57	26	24	—	57	—	—	—	—	65	RIAA: Gold	Savage Mode II
"No Opp Left Behind" (with Metro Boomin)	2020	71	30	—	—	78	—	—	—	—	86	RIAA: Gold	Savage Mode II
"RIP Luv" (with Metro Boomin)	2020	76	32	—	—	92	—	—	—	—	101	RIAA: Gold	Savage Mode II
"Said N Done" (with Metro Boomin)	2020	91	39	—	—	96	—	—	—	—	119		Savage Mode II
"Box of Churches" (Pooh Shiesty featuring 21 Savage)	2021	81	29	—	—	—	—	—	—	—	—		Shiesty Season
"Emergency" (featuring Gunna and Young Thug)	2021	— (Note: "Emergency" did not enter the Billboard Hot 100, but peaked at number 17 on the Bubbling Under Hot 100 Singles chart.)	—	—	—	—	—	—	—	—	—		Spiral: From the Book of Saw Soundtrack
"T.O.P." (G Herbo featuring 21 Savage)	2021	— (Note: "T.O.P." did not enter the Billboard Hot 100, but peaked at number four on the Bubbling Under Hot 100 Singles chart.)	—	—	—	—	—	—	—	—	—		25
"Bout a Million" (Pop Smoke featuring 21 Savage and 42 Dugg)	2021	54	19	15	61	23	128	76	— (Note: "Bout a Million" did not enter the NZ Top 40 Singles Chart, but peaked at number five on the NZ Hot Singles Chart.)	64	46		Faith
"Sticked Up" (DaBaby featuring 21 Savage)	2021	— (Note: "Sticked Up" did not enter the Billboard Hot 100, but peaked at number 23 on the Bubbling Under Hot 100 Singles chart.)	—	—	—	—	—	—	—	—	—		Back on My Baby Jesus Sh!t Again
"Hibachi" (Roddy Ricch featuring Kodak Black and 21 Savage)	2021	91	25	17	—	77	—	—	— (Note: "Hibachi" did not enter the NZ Top 40 Singles Chart, but peaked at number 13 on the NZ Hot Singles Chart.)	—	181		Live Life Fast
"Thought I Was Playing" (with Gunna)	2022	23	7	5	—	51	—	—	— (Note: "Thought I Was Playing" did not enter the NZ Top 40 Singles Chart, but peaked at number 14 on the NZ Hot Singles Chart.)	—	38		DS4Ever
"Keep Going" (DJ Khaled featuring Lil Durk, 21 Savage, and Roddy Ricch)	2022	57	18	17	—	67	—	—	—		— 113		God Did
"Way Past Luck" (DJ Khaled featuring 21 Savage)	2022	— (Note: "Way Past Luck" did not enter the Billboard Hot 100, but peaked at number five on the Bubbling Under Hot 100 Singles chart.)	34	—	—	—	—	—	—	—	—		God Did
"Major Distribution" (with Drake)	2022	3	2	2	10	3	85	5	4	5	3	ARIA: Gold	Her Loss
"On BS" (with Drake)	2022	4	3	3	39	4	118	—	8	— (Note: "On BS" did not enter the UK Singles Chart, as chart rules only allow three songs per artist to chart within the top one hundred at a time, but peaked at number 10 on the UK Streaming Chart.)	5	ARIA: Gold; BPI: Silver; RMNZ: Gold	Her Loss
"Privileged Rappers" (with Drake)	2022	7	6	6	78	10	148	—	—	— (Note: "Privileged Rappers" did not enter the UK Singles Chart, as chart rules only allow three songs per artist to chart within the top one hundred at a time, but peaked at number 23 on the UK Streaming Chart.)	9	ARIA: Gold	Her Loss
"Hours in Silence" (with Drake)	2022	11	9	9	—	13	177	—	—	— (Note: "Hours in Silence" did not enter the UK Singles Chart, as chart rules only allow three songs per artist to chart within the top one hundred at a time, but peaked at number 27 on the UK Streaming Chart.)	13	RMNZ: Gold	Her Loss
"Treacherous Twins" (with Drake)	2022	14	12	11	—	14	—	—	—	— (Note: "Treacherous Twins" did not enter the UK Singles Chart, as chart rules only allow three songs per artist to chart within the top one hundred at a time, but peaked at number 28 on the UK Streaming Chart.)	14		Her Loss
"Pussy & Millions" (with Drake featuring Travis Scott)	2022	6	5	5	5	6	96	95	5	— (Note: "Pussy & Millions" did not enter the UK Singles Chart, as chart rules only allow three songs per artist to chart within the top one hundred at a time, but peaked at number nine on the UK Streaming Chart.)	6	ARIA: Gold; RMNZ: Gold	Her Loss
"Broke Boys" (with Drake)	2022	12	10	10	87	12	—	—	—	— (Note: "Broke Boys" did not enter the UK Singles Chart, as chart rules only allow three songs per artist to chart within the top one hundred at a time, but peaked at number 29 on the UK Streaming Chart.)	12		Her Loss
"More M's" (with Drake)	2022	18	15	14	—	17	—	—	—	— (Note: "More M's" did not enter the UK Singles Chart, as chart rules only allow three songs per artist to chart within the top one hundred at a time, but peaked at number 50 on the UK Streaming Chart.)	28		Her Loss
"3AM on Glenwood"	2022	27	19	17	—	32	—	—	—	— (Note: "3AM on Glenwood" did not enter the UK Singles Chart, as chart rules only allow three songs per artist to chart within the top one hundred at a time, but peaked at number 70 on the UK Streaming Chart.)	45		Her Loss
"Umbrella" (with Metro Boomin and Young Nudy)	2022	23	7	4	75	14	150	—	—	—	29	MC: Gold	Heroes & Villains
"Niagara Falls (Foot or 2)" (with Metro Boomin and Travis Scott)	2022	27	8	5	43	8	154	32	37	46	21	ARIA: Platinum; BPI: Silver; MC: Platinum; RMNZ: Platinum	Heroes & Villains
"Walk Em Down (Don't Kill Civilians)" (with Metro Boomin featuring Mustafa)	2022	52	19	12	—	28	—	—	—	—	59		Heroes & Villains
"War Bout It" (Lil Durk featuring 21 Savage)	2023	41	13	8	—	59	—	—	— (Note: "War Bout It" did not enter the NZ Top 40 Singles Chart, but peaked at number nine on the NZ Hot Singles Chart.)	—	89		Almost Healed
"Nonviolent Communication" (with Metro Boomin, James Blake, and ASAP Rocky)	2023	— (Note: "Nonviolent Communication" did not enter the Billboard Hot 100, but peaked at number 25 on the Bubbling Under Hot 100 Singles chart.)	—	—	—	—	—	—	—	—	—		Spider-Man: Across the Spider-Verse (Soundtrack from and Inspired by the Motion Picture)
"Givin' Up (Not the One)" (with Don Toliver and 2 Chainz)	2023	— (Note: "Givin' Up (Not the One)" did not enter the Billboard Hot 100, but peaked at number seven on the Bubbling Under Hot 100 Singles chart.)	45	—	—	87	—	—	—	—	—		Spider-Man: Across the Spider-Verse (Soundtrack from and Inspired by the Motion Picture)
"Pull Up" (with Toosii)	2023	— (Note: "Pull Up" did not enter the Billboard Hot 100, but peaked at number 17 on the Bubbling Under Hot 100 Singles chart.)	49	—	—	—	—	—	—	—	—		Naujour
"Wit da Racks" (Young Thug featuring 21 Savage, Travis Scott, and Yak Gotti)	2023	56	18	14	—	70	—	—	— (Note: "Wit da Racks" did not enter the NZ Top 40 Singles Chart, but peaked at number 14 on the NZ Hot Singles Chart.)	—	163		Business Is Business
"Want Me Dead" (Young Thug featuring 21 Savage)	2023	59	9	16	—	77	—	—	— (Note: "Want Me Dead" did not enter the NZ Top 40 Singles Chart, but peaked at number 13 on the NZ Hot Singles Chart.)	—	194		Business Is Business
"Topia Twins" (Travis Scott featuring Rob49 and 21 Savage)	2023	17	10	9	29	17	60	—	17	— (Note: "Topia Twins" did not enter the UK Singles Chart, as chart rules only allow three songs per artist to chart within the top one hundred at a time, but peaked at number 59 on the UK Streaming Chart.)	17	RIAA: Platinum; MC: Platinum	Utopia
"Til Further Notice" (Travis Scott featuring James Blake and 21 Savage)	2023	38	20	18	—	33	86	—	39	— (Note: "Til Further Notice" did not enter the UK Singles Chart, as chart rules only allow three songs per artist to chart within the top one hundred at a time, but peaked at number 98 on the UK Streaming Chart.)	42	RIAA: Gold; BPI: Silver; MC: Platinum	Utopia
"Turks & Caicos" (Rod Wave featuring 21 Savage)	2023	24	9	7	—	—	—	—	— (Note: "Turks & Caicos" did not enter the NZ Top 40 Singles Chart, but peaked at number 29 on the NZ Hot Singles Chart.)	—	91	RIAA: Platinum	Nostalgia
"Calling for You" (Drake featuring 21 Savage)	2023	5	5	5	17	6	55	—	21	— (Note: "Calling for You" did not enter the UK Singles Chart, as chart rules only allow three songs per artist to chart within the top one hundred at a time, but peaked at number 19 on the UK Streaming Chart.)	9		For All the Dogs
"All of Me"	2024	18	8	6	63	18	177	—	— (Note: "All of Me" did not enter the NZ Top 40 Singles Chart, but peaked at number six on the NZ Hot Singles Chart.)	—	24	RIAA: Gold; MC: Gold	American Dream
"Sneaky"	2024	33	14	13	—	26	—	—	—	—	43	RIAA: Gold	American Dream
"Pop Ur Shit" (with Young Thug and Metro Boomin)	2024	31	13	12	—	29	—	—	—	—	44		American Dream
"Letter to My Brudda"	2024	59	25	22	—	54	—	—	—	—	92		American Dream
"Dangerous" (with Lil Durk and Metro Boomin)	2024	35	15	14	—	31	—	—	—	—	50		American Dream
"See the Real"	2024	66	27	24	—	53	—	—	—	—	104		American Dream
"Should've Wore a Bonnet" (with Brent Faiyaz)	2024	40	18	17	—	42	—	—	—	—	66	RIAA: Gold	American Dream
"Just Like Me" (with Burna Boy and Metro Boomin)	2024	67	28	25	—	49	—	—	—	—	93		American Dream
"Red Sky" (with Mikky Ekko and Tommy Newport)	2024	57	24	21	—	43	—	—	—	—	89		American Dream
"Dark Days" (with Mariah the Scientist)	2024	70	31	—	—	60	—	—	—	—	137		American Dream
"It's Up" (with Drake and Young Thug)	2024	28	8	6	—	24	—	94	— (Note: "It's Up" did not enter the NZ Top 40 Singles Chart, but peaked at number three on the NZ Hot Singles Chart.)	82	47		100 Gigs
"Gimme Gimme" (Katy Perry featuring 21 Savage)	2024	—	—	—	—	—	—	—	— (Note: "Gimme Gimme" did not enter the NZ Top 40 Singles Chart, but peaked at number 29 on the NZ Hot Singles Chart.)	—	—		143
"Outfit" (with Lil Baby)	2025	50	12	9	—	82	—	—	— (Note: "Outfit" did not enter the NZ Top 40 Singles Chart, but peaked at number eight on the NZ Hot Singles Chart.)	—	153		WHAM
"Where You From"	2025	86	14	10	—	90	—	—	— (Note: "Where You From" did not enter the NZ Top 40 Singles Chart, but peaked at number 7 on the NZ Hot Singles Chart.)	—	—		What Happened to the Streets?
"Ha"	2025	77	11	7	—	—	—	—	— (Note: "Ha" did not enter the NZ Top 40 Singles Chart, but peaked at number 11 on the NZ Hot Singles Chart.)	—	—		What Happened to the Streets?
"Stepbrothers" (with Young Nudy)	2025	89	15	11	—	—	—	—	— (Note: "Stepbrothers" did not enter the NZ Top 40 Singles Chart, but peaked at number 12 on the NZ Hot Singles Chart.)	—	—		What Happened to the Streets?
"Cup Full"	2025	— (Note: "Cup Full" did not enter the Billboard Hot 100, but peaked at number 11 on the Bubbling Under Hot 100 chart.)	30	24	—	—	—	—	—	—	—		What Happened to the Streets?
"Pop It" (with Latto)	2025	— (Note: "Pop It" did not enter the Billboard Hot 100, but peaked at number 4 on the Bubbling Under Hot 100 chart.)	22	16	—	—	—	—	—	—	—		What Happened to the Streets?
"J.O.W.Y.H (Jump Out)"	2025	— (Note: "J.O.W.Y.H (Jump Out)" did not enter the Billboard Hot 100, but peaked at number 8 on the Bubbling Under Hot 100 chart.)	26	20	—	—	—	—	—	—	—		What Happened to the Streets?
"Dog Shit" (with GloRilla)	2025	93	16	12	—	—	—	—	—	—	—		What Happened to the Streets?
"Code of Honor" (with G Herbo)	2025	— (Note: "Code of Honor" did not enter the Billboard Hot 100, but peaked at number 7 on the Bubbling Under Hot 100 chart.)	24	18	—	—	—	—	—	—	—		What Happened to the Streets?
"Gang Over Everything" (with Metro Boomin)	2025	— (Note: "Gang Over Everything" did not enter the Billboard Hot 100, but peaked at number 16 on the Bubbling Under Hot 100 chart.)	34	—	—	—	—	—	—	—	—		What Happened to the Streets?
"Halftime Interlude"	2025	—	48	—	—	—	—	—	—	—	—		What Happened to the Streets?
"Atlanta Tears" (with Lil Baby)	2025	— (Note: "Atlanta Tears" did not enter the Billboard Hot 100, but peaked at number 17 on the Bubbling Under Hot 100 chart.)	35	—	—	—	—	—	—	—	—		What Happened to the Streets?
"I Wish" (with Jawan Harris)	2025	— (Note: "I Wish" did not enter the Billboard Hot 100, but peaked at number 12 on the Bubbling Under Hot 100 chart.)	31	25	—	—	—	—	— (Note: "I Wish" did not enter the NZ Top 40 Singles Chart, but peaked at number 22 on the NZ Hot Singles Chart.)	—	—		What Happened to the Streets?
"B's on the Table" (Drake featuring 21 Savage)	2026	12	11	11	32	12	—	—	31	—	15		Iceman
"Hostage" (Latto featuring 21 Savage)	2026	88	39	—	—	—	—	—	—	—	—		Big Mama
"—" denotes a recording that did not chart or was not released in that territory.

== Guest appearances ==
List of non-single guest appearances, with other performing artists, showing year released and album name
Title	Year	Artist(s)	Album
"Money"	2013	Hood Rich Clikk	Migo Money
"Safe House"	2015	ManMan Savage	—N/a
"Peepin"	2015	Gucci Mane, Playboi Carti	—N/a
"Trapahol′ics"	2015	ManMan Savage	—N/a
"Ion Like"	2015	Trouble	Skoob Fresh
"Down"	2015	Gucci Mane, Tone Tone	East Atlanta Santa 2
"Same Game"	2016	GOLDe	—N/a
"I Want Her"	2016	Bankroll Mafia, Shad da God, T.I., Young Thug, Duke	Bankroll Mafia
"Flexing on Purpose"	2016	Ralo, Lil Uzi Vert, Young Thug	Diary of The Streets II
"150"	2016	Young Dolph	Rich Crack Baby
"Trap House"	2016	Rich the Kid	Trap Talk
"Never Had Shit"	2016	Lil Duke	Uber
"F It Up"	2016	Bricc Baby, Reese	Nasty Dealer 2
"Feel It"	2016	Zaytoven	Where Would the Game Be Without Me
"Need a Lighter"	2016	Lightshow	Life Sentence 3
"Outside"	2016	Travis Scott	Birds in the Trap Sing McKnight
"Offended"	2016	Meek Mill, Young Thug	DC4
"Bullshit"	2016	Dae Dae, London on da Track	The DefAnition
"King Zoo"	2016	Fetty Wap	Zoovier
"I Be On"	2016	YG	Red Friday
"Shooters2x"	2016	Lil Durk	They Forgot
"Murder (Remix)"	2017	YoungBoy Never Broke Again	The Fate of the Furious: The Album
"Iced Out My Arms"	2017	DJ Khaled, Future, Migos, T.I.	Grateful
"Both Sides"	2017	Nav, Metro Boomin	Perfect Timing
"Yellow Tape"	2017	Yo Gotti	I Still Am
"The Race (Remix)"	2017	Tay-K, Young Nudy	Santana World
"BBO (Bad Bitches Only)"	2018	Migos	Culture II
"Now"	2018	Young Thug	Hear No Evil
"Clout"	2018	Ty Dolla Sign	Beach House 3
"How I Grew Up"	2018	G Herbo, Southside	Swervo
"NC-17"	2018	Travis Scott	Astroworld
"Pass Out"	2018	Quavo	Quavo Huncho
"Don't Come out the House"	2018	Metro Boomin	Not All Heroes Wear Capes
"10 Freaky Girls"	2018	Metro Boomin	Not All Heroes Wear Capes
"No More"	2018	Metro Boomin, Travis Scott, Kodak Black	Not All Heroes Wear Capes
"Balenciagas"	2018	Lil Keed	Keed Talk To 'Em
"Pay You Back"	2018	Meek Mill	Championships
"Just Like It"	2018	Gucci Mane	Evil Genius
"Legacy"	2019	Offset, Travis Scott	Father of 4
"Wish Wish"	2019	DJ Khaled, Cardi B	Father of Asahd
"Mister"	2019	Young Nudy, Pi'erre Bourne	Sli'merre
"I'm Scared"	2019	Young Thug, Doe Boy	So Much Fun
"The Code"	2019	The Game	Born 2 Rap
"Yessirskiii"	2020	Lil Uzi Vert	Lil Uzi Vert vs. the World 2
"Psilocybae (Millennial Love)"	2020	Childish Gambino, Kadhja Bonet, Ink	3.15.20, Atavista
"Nasty"	2020	Gucci Mane, Young Nudy	So Icy Summer
"Pull Up"	2020	Latto	Queen of Da Souf
"Thank God"	2020	T.I.	The L.I.B.R.A.
"Box of Churches"	2021	Pooh Shiesty	Shiesty Season
"Child's Play"	2021	Young Nudy	Dr. EV4L
"T.O.P."	2021	G Herbo	25
"Number 2"	2021	KSI, Future	All Over the Place
"Bout a Million"	2021	Pop Smoke, 42 Dugg	Faith
"Sticked Up"	2021	DaBaby	Back on My Baby Jesus Sh!t Again
"Hibachi"	2021	Roddy Ricch, Kodak Black	Live Life Fast
"Thought I Was Playing"	2022	Gunna	DS4Ever
"Nobody"	2022	Blac Youngsta	4Life
"Let's Get It (Remix)"	2022	Hunxho	Street Poetry
"Keep Going"	2022	DJ Khaled, Lil Durk, Roddy Ricch	God Did
"Way Past Luck"	2022	DJ Khaled	God Did
"The Mud"	2022	Jacquees	Sincerely for You
"Umbrella"	2022	Metro Boomin, Young Nudy	Heroes & Villains
"Niagara Falls (Foot or 2)"	2022	Metro Boomin, Travis Scott	Heroes & Villains
"Walk Em Down (Don't Kill Civilians)"	2022	Metro Boomin, Mustafa	Heroes & Villains
"War Bout It"	2023	Lil Durk	Almost Healed
"By Chance"	2023	Giggs	Zero Tolerance
"Nonviolent Communication"	2023	Metro Boomin, James Blake, ASAP Rocky	Spider-Man: Across the Spider-Verse (Soundtrack from and Inspired by the Motion Picture)
"Givin' Up (Not the One)"	2023	Don Toliver, 2 Chainz	Spider-Man: Across the Spider-Verse (Soundtrack from and Inspired by the Motion Picture)
"Wit da Racks"	2023	Young Thug, Travis Scott, Yak Gotti	Business Is Business
"Want Me Dead"	2023	Young Thug	Business Is Business
"Topia Twins"	2023	Travis Scott, Rob49	Utopia
"Til Further Notice"	2023	Travis Scott, James Blake	Utopia
"77 Degrees"	2023	Mariah the Scientist	To Be Eaten Alive
"Turks & Caicos"	2023	Rod Wave	Nostalgia
"Pull Up"	2023	Toosii	Naujour
"Ain't on None"	2023	Lil Harold	After the Curse
"Loop Hole"	2023	Tee Grizzley	Tee's Coney Island
"Big Diamonds"	2023	2 Chainz, Lil Wayne	Welcome 2 Collegrove
"Calling for You"	2023	Drake	For All the Dogs
"Gimme Gimme"	2024	Katy Perry	143
"In the A"	2024	G Herbo	Big Swerv
"Outfit"	2025	Lil Baby	WHAM
"Kick Out"	2025	Travis Scott	JackBoys 2
"Hostage"	2026	Latto	Big Mama

== Production discography ==
List of producer and songwriting credits (excluding guest appearances, interpolations, and samples)
Track(s)	Year	Credit	Artist(s)	Album
3. "X"	2016	Producer (with Metro Boomin)	21 Savage	Savage Mode
2. "Bank Account"	2018	Producer (with Metro Boomin)	21 Savage	Issa Album
—N/a	2021	Executive producer	Young Nudy, Various artists	Spiral: From the Book of Saw (Soundtrack)

== Music videos ==
List of music videos, showing year released and directors
Title	Year	Director(s)	Ref.
As lead artist
"Red Rag, Blue Rag" (featuring Yung Booke and Freaky D$MG)	2015	TerminallyMill	
"Skrrt Skrrt"	2015	Kevin Wright Jr	
"H2O"	2015	Kevin Wright Jr	
"Red Opps"	2015	A Zae Production	
"Million Dollar Liq" (featuring ManMan Savage)	2015	Hidjifilms	
"Woah"	2015	Byrd Films	
"Air It Out" (featuring Young Nudy)	2015	OG Hoodrich	
"Dirty K" (featuring Lotto Savage)	2015	William Hoopes	
"Supply"	2016	William Hoopes	
"Dip Dip"	2016	—N/a	
"Motorcycle" (featuring Dreezy)	2016	Hoopes	
"No Heart" (with Metro Boomin)	2016	A Zae Production, ThePictureMan	
"Feel It" (with Metro Boomin)	2016	Rob Semmer	
"X" (with Metro Boomin featuring Future)	2016	Vincent Lou	
"All the Smoke"	2017	Matthew Swinsky	
"Nothin New"	2017	iNightLyfe	
"Bank Account"	2017	Swinsky	
"A Lot" (featuring J. Cole)	2019	Aisultan Seitov	
"Ball w/o you"	2019	WALU	
"Runnin" (with Metro Boomin)	2020	—N/a	
"My Dawg" (with Metro Boomin)	2020	Joe Weil	
"Glock in My Lap" (with Metro Boomin)	2021	Andrew Donoho	
"Spiral"	2021		
"Gully"	2021		
"Shoulda Wore a Bonnet" (featuring Brent Faiyaz)	2024		
As featured artist
"Money" (Hood Rich Clikk featuring 21 Savage)	2013	iNightLyfe	
"Wit da Shit" (Yung Mazi featuring 21 Savage)	2015	Wylout Films	
"Pockets" (Yakki featuring 21 Savage)	2016	iNightLyfe	
"F It Up" (Bricc Baby featuring 21 Savage and Reese)	2016	—N/a	
"Lit" (DJ Scream featuring 21 Savage, Juicy J and Young Dolph)	2016	Willam Hoopes	
"Murder (Remix)" (YoungBoy Never Broke Again featuring 21 Savage)	2016	David G	
"Gucci On My" (Mike Will Made It featuring 21 Savage, YG and Migos)	2017	—N/a	
"Rockstar" (Post Malone featuring 21 Savage)	2017	Emil Nava	
"Krippy Kush (Remix)" (Farruko featuring Nicki Minaj, Rvssian, Bad Bunny & 21 Savage)	2017	Derek King and Michael Wiley (Rock & Egg)	
"Crisis" (Rich Brain featuring 21 Savage)	2017	James Defina	
"Since When" (Young Nudy featuring 21 Savage)	2018	iNightLyfe	
"Outstanding" (SahBabii featuring 21 Savage)	2018		
"Rover 2.0" (BlocBoy JB featuring 21 Savage)	2018	Fredrivk Ali	
"Bartier Cardi" (Cardi B featuring 21 Savage)	2018	Petra Collins	
"Deal" (Casino featuring 21 Savage)	2018	Des Grey	
"10 Freaky Girls" (Metro Boomin featuring 21 Savage)	2019	Zac Facts	
"Wish Wish" (DJ Khaled featuring Cardi B and 21 Savage)	2019	—N/a	
"Float" (Schoolboy Q featuring 21 Savage)	2019	Jack Begert & Dave Free (of the little homies)	
"Enzo" (DJ Snake & Sheck Wes featuring Offset, Gucci Mane & 21 Savage)	2019	Daps	
"Show Me Love" (Alicia Keys featuring 21 Savage and Miguel)	2019	ART	
"Number 2" (KSI featuring Future and 21 Savage)	2021	Troy Roscoe and Nayip Ramos	
"Opp Stoppa" (YBN Nahmir featuring 21 Savage)	2021	Rock Davis	
"Let It Go" (DJ Khaled featuring Justin Bieber & 21 Savage)	2021		
"WHo Was Smoke?" (Nardo Wick featuring G Herbo, Lil Durk & 21 Savage)	2021	Cole Bennett	
"knife Talk" (Drake featuring 21 Savage)	2021	Pablo Rochat	
"Outlawz" (Rick Ross featuring Jasmine Sullivan & 21 Savage)	2021		
"Surround Sound" (JID featuring 21 Savage)	2022		
"Wheelie" (Latto featuring 21 Savage)	2022		
"Run" (YG featuring Bia, Tyga & 21 Savage)	2022	Chris Kirsch	
"Cash in Cash Out" (Pharrell featuring Tyler, the Creator & 21 Savage)	2022	François Rousselet	
"Keep Going" (DJ Khaled featuring Lil Durk, Roddy Rich & 21 Savage)	2022		
"Way Past Luck" (DJ Khaled featuring 21 Savage)	2022		
"Jimmy Cooks" (Drake featuring 21 Savage)	2022	Mahfuz Sultan	
"Ain't on None" (Lil Harold featuring 21 Savage)	2023	Chris Villa	
"Good Good" (Usher featuring Summer Walker & 21 Savage)	2023		
"Peaches n Eggplants" (Young Nudy featuring 21 Savage)	2023		
"Sittin on Top of the World" (Burna Boy featuring 21 Savage)	2023		
"Creepin' (Remix)" (Metro Boomin featuring The Weeknd, Diddy & 21 Savage)	2023		
"Another One of Me" (Diddy featuring French Montana, The Weeknd & 21 Savage)	2023		
"Topia Twins" (Travis Scott featuring 21 Savage)	2024	White Trash Tyler	
"Walk Em Down (Don't Kill Civilians) (Metro Boomin featuring Mustafa & 21 Savage)	2024		
"GBP" (Central Cee featuring 21 Savage)	2025	Cole Bennett	
