= Red Opps =

2016 single by 21 Savage

Single by 21 Savage

from the album Free Guwop
- Released: May 15, 2016
- Recorded: 2016
- Genre: Gangsta rap; trap
- Length: 2:43
- Label: Slaughter Gang LLC
- Songwriters: Shayaa Abraham-Joseph; Sonny Uwaezuoke
- Producer: Sonny Digital

21 Savage singles chronology
"One Foot" (2016)	"Red Opps" (2016)	"X" (2016)

Music video
- "Red Opps" on YouTube

"Red Opps" is a song by British-American rapper 21 Savage. Written and produced by Sonny Digital, it was released on May 15, 2016 by Slaughter Gang LLC, as the second single from his debut EP Free Guwop.

== Music video ==
The music video was directed by A Zae Production.

== Charts ==
Chart (2016)	Peak position
US Billboard Hot 100	74
US Hot R&B/Hip-Hop Songs (Billboard)	31

== Certifications ==
Region	Certification	Certified units/sales
United States (RIAA)	Platinum	1,000,000^{‡}
^{‡} Sales+streaming figures based on certification alone.
