= Umbrella (Metro Boomin, 21 Savage and Young Nudy song) =

2022 song by Metro Boomin, 21 Savage and Young Nudy

Song by Metro Boomin, 21 Savage and Young Nudy

from the album Heroes & Villains
- Released: December 2, 2022
- Length: 3:42
- Label: Boominati; Republic
- Songwriters: Leland Wayne; Shayaa Abraham-Joseph; Quantavious Thomas; Celso Valli; Peter Lee Johnson; David Ruoff; Elias Klughammer
- Producers: Metro Boomin; David x Eli

"Umbrella" is a song by American record producer Metro Boomin, Atlanta-based rapper 21 Savage and American rapper Young Nudy, from Metro's second studio album Heroes & Villains (2022). It was produced by Metro Boomin and David X Eli.

== Composition ==
The instrumental of the song contains a piano loop, which Charles Lyons-Burt of Slant described as "chilling".

== Critical reception ==
Hamza Riaz of Mic Cheque wrote in a review of Heroes & Villains, "There's no sensational beat that holds a candle to production like Without Warning's "Rap Saved Me" or the layers of "Don't Come Out the House", bringing up the "first twenty seconds" of "Umbrella" as one of the "closest moments" but also stating that the production "should have returned at some point in the song". Riaz considered "Umbrella" one of the best tracks from the album as well. Robert Blair of HotNewHipHop gave a positive review, writing, "the reverberating, poised piano of 'Umbrella' gives 21 Savage the chance to resummon the macabre energy of the Savage Mode team-up, alongside a highly complimentary verse from his cousin Young Nudy."

== Charts ==
Chart performance for "Umbrella"
Chart (2022)	Peak position
Australia (ARIA)	75
Canada Hot 100 (Billboard)	14
France (SNEP)	150
Global 200 (Billboard)	29
Portugal (AFP)	48
South Africa (Billboard)	20
US Billboard Hot 100	23
US Hot R&B/Hip-Hop Songs (Billboard)	7

== Certifications ==
Certifications for "Umbrella"
Region	Certification	Certified units/sales
Canada (Music Canada)	Gold	40,000^{‡}
^{‡} Sales+streaming figures based on certification alone.
