= Oh U Went =

2023 song by Young Thug featuring Drake

Single by Young Thug featuring Drake

from the album Business Is Business
- Released: July 18, 2023
- Genre: Trap
- Length: 3:05
- Label: YSL; 300; Atlantic
- Songwriters: Jeffery Williams; Aubrey Graham; Leland Wayne; Michael Mulé; Isaac De Boni; Jahmal Gwin
- Producers: Metro Boomin; FnZ; BoogzDaBeast

Young Thug singles chronology
| "My Wrist" (2023) | "Oh U Went" (2023) | "From a Man" (2023) |

Drake singles chronology
| "Who Told You" (2023) | "Oh U Went" (2023) | "On the Radar Freestyle" (2023) |

Music Video
- "Oh U Went" on YouTube

"Oh U Went" is a song by American rapper Young Thug featuring Canadian rapper Drake, released on June 23, 2023 as a track from the former's third studio album Business Is Business, before being sent to rhythmic radio as the album's lead single on July 18. It was written alongside producers Metro Boomin, FnZ, and BoogzDaBeast. The song samples "Closer Than Close" by The Stylistics.

== Critical reception ==
"Oh U Went" received generally positive reviews from music critics. Aron A. of HotNewHipHop commented that Young Thug delivers "smooth flows with the elasticity of his voice" and "However, it's Drake that comes through with a stand-out verse filled with opulent flexes and effortless wordplay." Mark Braboy of Rolling Stone described Drake as "perfectly shifting between rapping and harmonizing on 'Oh U Went'". In an otherwise mixed review of Business Is Business, Vernon Ayiku of Exclaim! cited it as a stand-out and one of the few songs with "replay value", although stating it is "led mainly by the strength of Metro Boomin's production." Paul A. Thompson of Pitchfork called the song "exultant" and "a potential hit, in large part due to Thug's unique ability to teeter on the tonal knife's edge that separates sincerity and contempt."

== Charts ==
=== Weekly charts ===
Weekly chart performance for "Oh U Went"
| Chart (2023) | Peak position |
|---|---|
| Canada Hot 100 (Billboard) | 20 |
| Global 200 (Billboard) | 35 |
| New Zealand Hot Singles (RMNZ) | 5 |
| UK Singles (Official Charts) | 65 |
| US Billboard Hot 100 | 19 |
| US Hot R&B/Hip-Hop Songs (Billboard) | 9 |
| US Rhythmic Airplay (Billboard) | 13 |

=== Year-end charts ===
Year-end chart performance for "Oh U Went"
| Chart (2023) | Position |
|---|---|
| US Hot R&B/Hip-Hop Songs (Billboard) | 52 |
