= Ghostface Killers =

2017 song by 21 Savage, Offset and Metro Boomin featuring Travis Scott

Song by 21 Savage, Offset and Metro Boomin featuring Travis Scott

from the album Without Warning
- Released: October 31, 2017
- Length: 4:28
- Label: Slaughter Gang; Epic; Capitol; Motown; Quality Control; Boominati; Republic
- Songwriters: Shayaa Abraham-Joseph; Kiari Cephus; Leland Wayne; Jacques Webster II
- Producer: Metro Boomin

"Ghostface Killers" is a song by British-American rapper 21 Savage, American rapper Offset, and American record producer Metro Boomin featuring fellow American rapper Travis Scott. It was released on October 31, 2017 as the opening track from the former three's collaborative studio album Without Warning. The title is a reference to Ghostface Killah of the hip hop group Wu-Tang Clan.

== Composition ==
Over a "sinister" beat, the song begins with Offset rapping in the chorus and first verse about his diamond jewelry and having shooters by his side, while switching his flow and using his signature triplet rhyme scheme. In the second verse, 21 Savage immediately compares himself to North Korean leader Kim Jong-un as a joke, while rapping about how he is still hanging out with the "killers" and "gorillas" with guns. The third verse finds Travis Scott in Auto-Tune laced vocals, referencing his drug use and being a "Nike" boy.

Gary Suarez of Consequence Of Sound wrote, "While less overtly villainous than his deadpan cohort, Offset lets Savage’s sinister sensibilities rub off on him at times, particularly on opener 'Ghostface Killers'."

== Critical reception ==
The song received generally positive reviews. Marshall Gu of Pretty Much Amazing wrote in a review of Without Warning, "And the best song comes early in 'Ghostface Killers', with an excellent rapped chorus from Offset that's been running through my head since the tape dropped and Travis Scott sounding excellent as always even if he doesn't say much anything at all." Trent Clark of HipHopDX also considered "Ghostface Killers" the best track from Without Warning, adding that "The Travis Scott inclusion is an obvious draw but when you have a bridge, a chorus and layered instrumentation, it's not a coincidence the song quality can raise above mixtape level."

== Charts ==
Chart (2017)	Peak position
Australia (ARIA)	69
Canada Hot 100 (Billboard)	14
Denmark (Tracklisten)	37
Germany (GfK)	94
Latvia (DigiTop100)	92
Netherlands (Single Top 100)	95
Portugal (AFP)	81
Sweden (Sverigetopplistan)	76
Switzerland (Schweizer Hitparade)	40
UK Singles (OCC)	60
US Billboard Hot 100	35
US Hot R&B/Hip-Hop Songs (Billboard)	14

== Certifications ==
Region	Certification	Certified units/sales
Australia (ARIA)	Gold	35,000^{‡}
Canada (Music Canada)	Platinum	80,000^{‡}
Denmark (IFPI Danmark)	Gold	45,000^{‡}
New Zealand (RMNZ)	Platinum	30,000^{‡}
United Kingdom (BPI)	Silver	200,000^{‡}
United States (RIAA)	2× Platinum	2,000,000^{‡}
^{‡} Sales+streaming figures based on certification alone.
