= Wit da Racks =

2023 song by Young Thug featuring 21 Savage, Travis Scott and Yak Gotti

Song by Young Thug featuring 21 Savage, Travis Scott and Yak Gotti

from the album Business Is Business
- Released: June 23, 2023
- Length: 3:46
- Label: YSL; 300; Atlantic
- Songwriters: Jeffery Williams; Shéyaa Abraham-Joseph; Jacques Webster II; Deamonte Kendrick; Wesley Glass; Dylan Cleary-Krell
- Producers: Wheezy; Dez Wright

"Wit da Racks" is a song by American rapper Young Thug from his third studio album Business Is Business (2023). It features rappers 21 Savage, Travis Scott and Yak Gotti. The song was produced by Wheezy and Dez Wright.

== Composition ==
The production of the song is built upon sub-bass, horns and drums. In the chorus, Young Thug mentions summoning a club owner to pay him for a walkthrough appearance and says if one snatches his chain he will get it back. He performs the opening verse, in which he details his extravagant lifestyle including the "waterfall" of his jewelry and beautiful women.

== Critical reception ==
The song received generally favorable reviews. Rolling Stone's Mark Braboy considered it one of the "most exhilarating moments" on Business Is Business, writing "Each of them overdelivers atop grandiose horns and drums, especially Travis and 21 Savage, who link up for a brutalizing verse". Paul Attard of Slant Magazine called Young Thug's lyrics proclaiming he is going to "pull up" and "finger her cat" as "one of his more creative sex brags in a while." Writing for Pitchfork, Paul A. Thompson commented "The song leverages his keen pop instincts and elastic eccentricities at once" and that by the end of Young Thug's verse, his "nods to dull wealth grow syntactically strange", adding "But the oddest thing Thug says is that 'every album got no skippin'': odd not because his LPs are padded with filler, but because there's never been any sense that Thug thinks of his catalog in those discrete, contractually measurable terms."

== Charts ==
Chart performance for "Wit da Racks"
Chart (2023)	Peak position
Canada Hot 100 (Billboard)	70
Global 200 (Billboard)	165
New Zealand Hot Singles (RMNZ)	14
US Billboard Hot 100	56
US Hot R&B/Hip-Hop Songs (Billboard)	18
