= Bank Account (song) =

2017 single by 21 Savage

Single by 21 Savage

from the album Issa Album
- Released: August 8, 2017
- Recorded: 2017
- Genre: Southern hip-hop; trap
- Length: 3:40
- Label: Slaughter Gang; RED; Epic
- Songwriters: Shéyaa bin Abraham-Joseph; Leland Tyler Wayne
- Producers: 21 Savage; Metro Boomin

21 Savage singles chronology
"Gucci on My" (2017)	"Bank Account" (2017)	"Rockstar" (2017)

Music video
- "Bank Account" on YouTube

Audio sample
- 21 Savage - "Bank Account": file; help

"Bank Account" is a song by British-American rapper 21 Savage. Written and produced alongside Metro Boomin, it was released as the lead single of 21 Savage's debut studio album, Issa Album, on August 8, 2017. The music video, directed by Matthew Swinsky, was released on November 10, 2017. The song contains a sample from the soundtrack album of The Education of Sonny Carson.

== Production ==
On the July 20, 2017 edition of Everyday Struggle, 21 Savage appeared as a guest. When asked about his production on the track, 21 stated, "'Bank Account' was just straight me. Metro just dragged it out to make it long enough for me to rap on and added the little pauses in the beat and bringing the beat back. But the melody, the bass, the sample, the hi-hat; I did all that shit." The song samples the ninth track of The Education of Sonny Carson OST, titled "Flashbulbs".

== Music video ==
The music video was directed by Matthew Swinsky and was released to YouTube on November 10, 2017.It sits at 130 million of views.

== Critical reception ==
Jon Caramanica of The New York Times opined that the song is among 21 Savage's "best and most fully realized songs to date." Reviewing the album, Sheldon Pearce of Pitchfork expressed that the song's production's "clean minimalism is one of the surprises", while lyrically its makes "the same banal comment about an increased cash flow," along with the tracks "Dead People" and "Money Convo".

== Remix ==
American rapper Joyner Lucas released a remix of the song onto SoundCloud and YouTube on December 18, 2017.

== Charts ==
=== Weekly charts ===
Weekly chart performance
Chart (2017–18)	Peak position
Australia (ARIA)	55
Belgium (Ultratip Bubbling Under Flanders)	22
Belgium (Ultratip Bubbling Under Wallonia)	30
Canada Hot 100 (Billboard)	16
Czech Republic Singles Digital (ČNS IFPI)	64
Ireland (IRMA)	63
Latvia (DigiTop100)	22
Netherlands (Single Tip)	1
New Zealand (Recorded Music NZ)	39
Philippines (Philippine Hot 100)	78
Portugal (AFP)	36
Slovakia Singles Digital (ČNS IFPI)	54
Sweden (Sverigetopplistan)	57
Switzerland (Schweizer Hitparade)	65
UK Singles (Official Charts)	41
UK Hip Hop/R&B (Official Charts)	14
US Billboard Hot 100	12
US Hot R&B/Hip-Hop Songs (Billboard)	5
US Hot Rap Songs (Billboard)	4
US Rhythmic Airplay (Billboard)	15

=== Year-end charts ===
Annual chart rankings
Chart (2017)	Position
Canada (Canadian Hot 100)	57
Portugal (AFP)	90
US Billboard Hot 100	48
US Hot R&B/Hip-Hop Songs (Billboard)	23
US Hot Rap Songs (Billboard)	15
Chart (2018)	Position
Portugal (AFP)	195
US Hot R&B/Hip-Hop Songs (Billboard)	69
US Hot Rap Songs (Billboard)	50
US Streaming Songs (Billboard)	50

== Certifications ==
Region	Certification	Certified units/sales
Australia (ARIA)	2× Platinum	140,000^{‡}
Brazil (Pro-Música Brasil)	2× Platinum	120,000^{‡}
Canada (Music Canada)	8× Platinum	640,000^{‡}
Denmark (IFPI Danmark)	Platinum	90,000^{‡}
France (SNEP)	Platinum	200,000^{‡}
Germany (BVMI)	Gold	200,000^{‡}
Italy (FIMI)	Gold	25,000^{‡}
New Zealand (RMNZ)	3× Platinum	90,000^{‡}
Poland (ZPAV)	Platinum	50,000^{‡}
Portugal (AFP)	Platinum	10,000^{‡}
Spain (Promusicae)	Gold	30,000^{‡}
Sweden (GLF)	Gold	20,000^{‡}
United Kingdom (BPI)	Platinum	600,000^{‡}
United States (RIAA)	6× Platinum	6,000,000^{‡}
^{‡} Sales+streaming figures based on certification alone.
