= Rap Saved Me =

2017 song by 21 Savage, Offset and Metro Boomin featuring Quavo

Song by 21 Savage, Offset and Metro Boomin featuring Quavo

from the album Without Warning
- Released: October 31, 2017
- Genre: Hip hop; trap
- Length: 4:17
- Label: Slaughter Gang; Epic; Capitol; Motown; Quality Control; Boominati; Republic
- Songwriter(s): Shayaa Abraham-Joseph; Kiari Cephus; Leland Wayne; Quavious Marshall
- Producer(s): Metro Boomin

"Rap Saved Me" is a song by Atlanta-based rapper 21 Savage, American rapper Offset, and American record producer Metro Boomin featuring fellow American rapper Quavo from the former three's collaborative studio album Without Warning (2017).

== Composition ==
The production in the song contains synthesized strings, which Marshall Gu of Pretty Much Amazing described as "sounding like squeaky metal". The song revolves around the rappers' lifestyle of luxury goods, as they make references to items such as French couture, Swiss watches, and Austrian firearms.

== Critical reception ==
Sheldon Pearce of Pitchfork praised the "understated tectonic shift" within the instrumental during Offset's verse, as one of the signs of the production's "balance between ghostly and ghastly" throughout Without Warning.

== Charts ==
Chart (2017)	Peak position
Canada (Canadian Hot 100)	46
US Billboard Hot 100	64
US Hot R&B/Hip-Hop Songs (Billboard)	26

== Certifications ==
Region	Certification	Certified units/sales
United States (RIAA)	Platinum	1,000,000^{‡}
^{‡} Sales+streaming figures based on certification alone.
