= Business Is Business (Young Thug album) =

Studio album by Young Thug
- Released: June 23, 2023
- Length: 46:40
- Label: YSL; 300; Atlantic
- Producer: Metro Boomin (also exec.); Allen Ritter; Aviator Keyyz; Bak; Bobby Raps; BoogzDaBeast; Charlie Heat; D. Rich; David x Eli; Dez Wright; Dr. Luke; Dre Moon; F1lthy; FnZ; Jonah Abraham; Kid Masterpiece; London on da Track; Peter Lee Johnson; Southside; Wheezy; Zinobeatz

Young Thug chronology
Punk (2021)	Business Is Business (2023)	UY Scuti (2025)

Singles from Business Is Business
- 1. "Oh U Went" Released: July 18, 2023

Business Is Business (stylized in all caps) is the third studio album by American rapper Young Thug. It was released on June 23, 2023, through YSL Records and was distributed by Atlantic Records and 300 Entertainment. The album features guest appearances from Drake, Future, 21 Savage, Travis Scott, Yak Gotti, Lil Uzi Vert, BSlime, Lil Gotit and Nate Ruess. American record producer and album executive producer Metro Boomin's version of the album was released four days later on June 27, 2023, and is the tracklist that he originally envisioned, along with bonus tracks. It features additional guest appearances from Nicki Minaj and the late Juice Wrld. Production on the album was handled by Metro Boomin, Wheezy, London on da Track, Dr. Luke, FnZ, Allen Ritter, Dre Moon, F1lthy, Southside, Bobby Raps, and among others.

Business Is Business marks Young Thug's first project since his arrest on Racketeer Influenced and Corrupt Organizations Act (RICO) charges in May 2022, in which it was released while he was in jail. The album was supported by one single, "Oh U Went", which features Drake and was sent to rhythmic contemporary radio on July 18, 2023. It serves as the follow-up to his previous album, Punk (2021).

== Background ==
On May 9, 2022, Young Thug was arrested in a massive gang indictment alongside multiple other affiliates of his record label, Young Stoner Life, with one of them notably being fellow American rapper Gunna, who turned himself in two days later, and also Yak Gotti, who also appears on the album. The 28 defendants were later charged with 56 counts related to gang activity and racketeering. At the time of the release of the album, he was still incarcerated and has been denied bond several times. Thug has since pleaded not guilty to the charges against him. His trial started in July 2023. In reference to the situation, the album cover depicts Thug in a courtroom surrounded by co-defendants. The record was announced on the rapper's social media on June 22, 2023. American record producer Metro Boomin, who also serves as the executive producer of the album, later shared the announcement on his social media in support of the rapper. He had previously posted a QR code leading to a countdown on his website with the album title and tagged Thug on June 16. The clock was also shared by fellow rappers and producers Drake, Chance the Rapper, Gunna, Don Toliver, Quavo, Doe Boy, Lil Durk, 21 Savage, G Herbo, Ty Dolla Sign, Chase B, London on da Track, Southside and Wheezy.

== Critical reception ==
Professional ratings
Aggregate scores
Source	Rating
Metacritic	64/100
Review scores
Source	Rating
AllMusic	3/5 stars
Exclaim!	5/10
HipHopDX	3.4/5
Mic Cheque	5/10
Pitchfork	7.0/10
Rolling Stone	2.5/5 stars
Slant Magazine	4/5 stars

Business Is Business received generally favorable reviews. At Metacritic, which assigns a normalized rating out of 100 to reviews from professional publications, the album received an average score of 64, based on five reviews.

In a mixed review, Mark Braboy of Rolling Stone wrote "The title Business Is Business feels appropriate. Thug's performance is just that. Strictly business. Eerily, the album's hodge-podge quality has the feel of a posthumous LP made by someone who is still alive. The boundary-pushing, dress-rocking, unpredictable superstar we've watched evolve over the years feels significantly diminished here. Whatever the spark the music has is largely carried by his guests" and "Such moments excepted, the content of Business Is Business feels bland, especially for an expectations-thwarting artist like Thug". Paul Attard of Slant Magazine wrote, "Bizarre vocalic inflections and utterances aside, Business Is Business also abounds in Thug's trademark outlandish songwriting quirks." Vernon Ayiku of Exclaim! stated, "Overall, the album doesn't have a lot of replay value besides a few stand-out songs like the Drake-featuring "Oh U Went" and "Went Thru It," which is led mainly by the strength of Metro Boomin's production."

Reviewing for HipHopDX, Dash Lewis praised the production of the album, stating "More than anything, Business is a triumph for Metro Boomin's curatorial skills, earning his executive producer credit by guiding the album's greyscale sound. Metro provides the lion's share of the beats, but the other producers he recruits — Wheezy, Aviator Keyyz, F1LTHY — match the unsteady atmosphere", but also wrote "There isn't much more context to be found in the music, which isn't nearly as fun or inventive as his previous work. It's unclear exactly what Thug was trying to communicate here; if it's meant to be a good bit of escapism, both for artist and audience, it's a little too brooding." Paul A. Thompson of Pitchfork wrote, "Business Is Business, perhaps due to its nature as a cobbled-together collection from someone who can't access a recording studio, even to comb through his vaults, frequently recalls Thug's loosest, most apparently improvisatory work. It's all the more compelling for it."

== Commercial performance ==
Business Is Business debuted at two on the US Billboard 200 chart, earning 89,000 album-equivalent units (including 9,000 pure sales) in its first week. The album also accumulated a total of 106.32 million on-demand streams of the album's songs. The album is Thug's ninth top-ten debut and his first to not reach the number one section on the Billboard 200.

== Track listing ==
Business Is Business track listing
No.	Title	Writer(s)	Producer(s)	Length
1.	"Parade on Cleveland" (featuring Drake)	Jeffery Williams; Aubrey Graham; Leland Wayne; David Ruoff; Elias Klughammer; Kaushik Barua; Sinan Dogan	Metro Boomin; David x Eli; Kid Masterpiece; Zinobeatz	3:48
2.	"Money on the Dresser"	Williams; Kenneth Gilmore	Aviator Keyyz	2:13
3.	"Gucci Grocery Bag"	Williams; Gilmore	Aviator Keyyz	2:55
4.	"Cars Bring Me Out" (featuring Future)	Williams; Nayvadius Wilburn; Wesley Glass; Dylan Cleary-Krell	Wheezy; Dez Wright	3:22
5.	"Wit da Racks" (featuring 21 Savage, Travis Scott, and Yak Gotti)	Williams; Shéyaa Abraham-Joseph; Jacques Webster II; Deamonte Kendrick; Glass; Cleary-Krell	Wheezy; Dez Wright	3:46
6.	"Uncle M"	Williams; Webster; Wayne; Dwayne Richardson	Metro Boomin; D. Rich	2:20
7.	"Abracadabra" (featuring Travis Scott)	Williams; Webster; Wayne; London Holmes	Metro Boomin; London on da Track	4:07
8.	"Went Thru It"	Williams; Łukasz Gottwald	Dr. Luke	2:35
9.	"Oh U Went" (featuring Drake)	Williams; Graham; Wayne; Michael Mulé; Isaac De Boni; Jahmal Gwin	Metro Boomin; FnZ; BoogzDaBeast	3:05
10.	"Want Me Dead" (featuring 21 Savage)	Williams; Abraham-Joseph; Wayne; Allen Ritter; Andre Proctor; Ruoff; Klughammer	Metro Boomin; Ritter; Dre Moon; David x Eli	3:14
11.	"Hellcat Kenny" (featuring Lil Uzi Vert)	Williams; Symere Woods; Richard Ortiz; Jonah Abraham	F1lthy; Abraham	2:34
12.	"Mad Dog"	Williams; Wayne	Metro Boomin	3:49
13.	"Jonesboro"	Williams; Wayne	Metro Boomin	2:43
14.	"Hoodie" (featuring BSlime and Lil Gotit)	Williams; Jaborious Grier; Semaja Render; Joshua Luellen; Wayne	Southside; Metro Boomin	3:35
15.	"Global Access" (featuring Nate Ruess)	Williams; Nathaniel Ruess; Robert Richardson; Wayne; Glass; Peter Lee Johnson; Ryan Lallier; Alexander Bak	Bobby Raps; Metro Boomin; Wheezy; Johnson; Bak	2:28
Total length:				46:40

Business Is Business (Metro's Version)
No.	Title	Writer(s)	Producer(s)	Length
1.	"Jonesboro"	Williams; Wayne	Metro Boomin	2:43
2.	"Mad Dog"	Williams; Wayne	Metro Boomin	2:49
3.	"Uncle M"	Williams; Webster; Wayne; D. Richardson	Metro Boomin; D. Rich	2:20
4.	"Want Me Dead" (featuring 21 Savage)	Williams; Abraham-Joseph; Wayne; Ritter; Proctor; Ruoff; Klughammer	Metro Boomin; Ritter; Dre Moon; David x Eli	3:14
5.	"Cars Bring Me Out" (featuring Future)	Williams; Wilburn; Glass; Cleary-Krell	Wheezy; Dez Wright	3:22
6.	"Oh U Went" (featuring Drake)	Williams; Graham; Wayne; Mulé; De Boni; Gwin	Metro Boomin; FnZ; BoogzDaBeast	3:05
7.	"Money" (featuring Juice Wrld and Nicki Minaj)	Williams; Jarad Higgins; Onika Maraj; Ernest Brown	Charlie Heat	4:26
8.	"Hoodie" (featuring BSlime and Lil Gotit)	Williams; Grier; Render; Luellen; Wayne	Southside; Metro Boomin	3:35
9.	"Wit da Racks" (featuring 21 Savage, Travis Scott, and Yak Gotti)	Williams; Abraham-Joseph; Webster; Kendrick; Glass; Cleary-Krell	Wheezy; Dez Wright	3:46
10.	"Parade on Cleveland" (featuring Drake)	Williams; Graham; Wayne; Ruoff; Klughammer; Barua; Dogan	Metro Boomin; David x Eli; Kid Masterpiece; Zinobeatz	3:48
11.	"Abracadabra" (featuring Travis Scott)	Williams; Webster; Wayne; Holmes	Metro Boomin; London on da Track	4:07
12.	"Went Thru It"	Williams; Gottwald	Dr. Luke	2:35
13.	"Money on the Dresser"	Williams; Gilmore	Aviator Keyyz	2:13
14.	"Hellcat Kenny" (featuring Lil Uzi Vert)	Williams; Woods; Ortiz; Abraham	F1lthy; Abraham	2:34
15.	"Gucci Grocery Bag"	Williams; Gilmore	Aviator Keyyz	2:55
16.	"Global Access" (featuring Nate Ruess)	Williams; Ruess; R. Richardson; Wayne; Glass; Johnson; Bak	Bobby Raps; Metro Boomin; Wheezy; Johnson; Bak	2:28
17.	"Sake of My Kids"	Williams; Glass	Wheezy	3:58
Total length:				55:05

=== Notes ===
- "Uncle M" features additional vocals from Travis Scott

== Charts ==
=== Weekly charts ===
Chart performance for Business Is Business
Chart (2023)	Peak position
Australian Albums (ARIA)	36
Austrian Albums (Ö3 Austria)	13
Belgian Albums (Ultratop Flanders)	30
Belgian Albums (Ultratop Wallonia)	32
Canadian Albums (Billboard)	2
Danish Albums (Hitlisten)	29
Dutch Albums (Album Top 100)	19
French Albums (SNEP)	41
German Albums (Offizielle Top 100)	22
Icelandic Albums (Tónlistinn)	3
Italian Albums (FIMI)	50
Lithuanian Albums (AGATA)	27
New Zealand Albums (RMNZ)	7
Norwegian Albums (VG-lista)	19
Polish Albums (ZPAV)	65
Spanish Albums (PROMUSICAE)	88
Swiss Albums (Schweizer Hitparade)	6
UK Albums (OCC)	15
US Billboard 200	2
US Top R&B/Hip-Hop Albums (Billboard)	1

=== Year-end charts ===
Year-end chart performance for Business Is Business
Chart (2023)	Position
US Top R&B/Hip-Hop Albums (Billboard)	66
