= Immortal (21 Savage song) =

2019 song by 21 Savage

Single by 21 Savage
- Released: October 31, 2019
- Length: 4:15
- Label: Epic; Slaughter Gang
- Songwriters: Shéyaa Bin Abraham-Joseph; Ahmar Bailey; Peter Gundry
- Producers: Kid Hazel; Gundry

21 Savage singles chronology
"Motivation (Savage Remix)" (2019)	"Immortal" (2019)	"Psilocybae (Millennial Love)" (2020)

Audio video
- "Immortal" on YouTube

"Immortal" is a song by British-American rapper 21 Savage, released on October 31, 2019.

== Background ==
21 Savage previewed the song in the trailer for the video game Mortal Kombat 11 in early December 2018. It was originally speculated to appear on his second studio album, I Am > I Was, but when it did not occur, its release date was left undetermined. On August 10, 2019, Savage took to Twitter to tease the track's release, which occurred on October 31, 2019.

== Lyrics ==
In the song, 21 raps about his murderous tendencies and also mentions names of characters in the Mortal Kombat video game series, Liu Kang, Sub-Zero, Jax, Scorpion and Cyrax.

== Charts ==
Chart (2019)	Peak position
Canada Hot 100 (Billboard)	58
Lithuania (AGATA)	83
New Zealand Hot Singles (RMNZ)	15
US Billboard Hot 100	55
US Hot R&B/Hip-Hop Songs (Billboard)	25
US Hot Rap Songs (Billboard)	21
US Rolling Stone Top 100	16

== Certifications ==
Region	Certification	Certified units/sales
New Zealand (RMNZ)	Gold	15,000^{‡}
United States (RIAA)	2× Platinum	2,000,000^{‡}
^{‡} Sales+streaming figures based on certification alone.
