= War Bout It =

2023 song by Lil Durk featuring 21 Savage

Song by Lil Durk featuring 21 Savage

from the album Almost Healed
- Released: May 26, 2023
- Genre: Gangsta rap; drill
- Length: 2:40
- Label: Only the Family; Alamo; Sony
- Songwriters: Durk Banks; Shéyaa Abraham-Joseph; Leland Wayne
- Producer: Metro Boomin

"War Bout It" is a song by American rapper Lil Durk featuring Atlanta-based rapper 21 Savage. Written alongside producer Metro Boomin, it was released on May 26, 2023 as from the former's eighth studio album Almost Healed (2023).

== Composition ==
The production of the song contains drum patterns and timbers, synth pads in the background, piano leads, and vocal samples. It begins with Lil Durk rapping. The second verse is performed by 21 Savage, who details his high status in the streets and criticizes gangsters that think too highly of themselves.

== Critical reception ==
The song received generally positive reviews from critics. Gabriel Bras Nevares of HotNewHipHop stated, "'War Bout It' is one of a few standout collaborations on the album's tracklist, and it's one that's right up the feature's alley. That's due to the eerie, sharp, and dramatic production courtesy of none other than Metro Boomin. While this track is nothing new or particularly surprising from this trio, it does an effective job of providing one of the more villainous moments on Almost Healed." Nevares also praised 21 Savage's performance, writing "Of course, 21 Savage can ride a beat from the St. Louis legend with his eyes closed, and his flows display that skill aptly", as well as that of Lil Durk, writing he "opens the track up with more evocative imagery, narrations, and references. Furthermore, The Voice has a strong ability to make his street-themed bars pack a little more punch than most other hip-hop artists in the mainstream. Whether it's through unique descriptions or clever turns of phrases, he takes advantage of all his material." Robin Murray of Clash commented that 21 Savage "loans some ammunition" to the song. In an otherwise mixed review of Almost Healed, Paul Attard of Slant Magazine wrote, "Save for 'Grandson' and 'War Bout It,' there's seldom a track here that sounds truly suitable for".

Dylan Green of Pitchfork had a less favorable response to the song, regarding it as one of the "run-of-the-mill collaborations" from the album.

== Charts ==
Chart performance for "War Bout It"
Chart (2023)	Peak position
Canada Hot 100 (Billboard)	59
Global 200 (Billboard)	89
New Zealand Hot Singles (RMNZ)	9
US Billboard Hot 100	41
US Hot R&B/Hip-Hop Songs (Billboard)	13
