= Calling for You =

2023 song by Drake featuring 21 Savage

Song by Drake featuring 21 Savage

from the album For All the Dogs
- Released: October 6, 2023
- Length: 4:45
- Label: OVO; Republic
- Songwriters: Aubrey Graham; Shéyaa Abraham-Joseph; Miles McCollum; Noah Shebib; Gentuar Memishi; Cashmere Small; T. Flores; J. Milfort; Francis LeBlanc; Nohelani Cypriano; Dennis Graue
- Producers: Lil Yachty; 40; Gent!; Cash Cobain; PoWRTrav; JayStolaa

"Calling for You" is a song by Canadian rapper Drake from his eighth studio album For All the Dogs (2023). Featuring Atlanta-based rapper 21 Savage, it was produced by Lil Yachty, 40, Gent!, Cash Cobain, PoWRTrav and JayStolaait. The song samples "Livin Without You" by Nohelani Cypriano, "Calling 4 You (Freestyle)" by Fridayy, and "Shake It to the Ground" by Blaqstarr and Rye Rye, the last of which is uncredited.

== Content ==
The song finds Drake detailing his sexual relationship with a woman, whom he describes as 21 years old and not a "savage" (a pun on 21 Savage's stage name).

== Controversy ==
Through a number of posts on Twitter, Rye Rye criticized Drake for sampling her vocals in the song without crediting her.

== Critical reception ==
Billboard's Kyle Denis ranked the track as the worst track on the album. Denis wrote that the track felt "flat" and that the "Her Loss connection is too overt to make this song feel a part of the For All the Dogs world". The song received generally negative reviews. Nadine Smith of The Independent wrote "Almost as if his bars were engineered in a laboratory to incite online discourse, Drake constantly reminds you of his age by directing his fragilities at women significantly younger than himself", mentioning the woman in question on "Calling for You" as an example. Complex's Kemet High commented that "Fridayy's sonorous crooning in the back of 'Calling For You' was A1", while Ecleen Luzmila Caraballo commented, "some of the voice samples felt unnecessary; on songs like 'Calling For You,' it was especially annoying and jarring." Alex Swhear of Variety considered the song "a serviceable 21 Savage collaboration that doesn't approach the heights from Her Loss". Louis Pavlakos of HipHopDX praised the production, writing "Cash Cobain brings out a strong raunchy side of Drake on 'Calling For You'". Charles Holmes of The Ringer stated, "On 'Calling for You,' Drake raps over the type of sprawling, gothic beats that became his calling card. The Fridayy sample that anchors the song is peak Drake-core, so indebted to So Far Gone and Take Care it could've been a loosie left on the cutting-room floor. And yet halfway through the song, we're treated to an insufferable 90-second skit about a woman dissatisfied with flying economy and jerk chicken. If you're thinking, 'What does this have to do with Drake?' well, it's most likely a convoluted Pusha T diss based on his American Airlines tweets—a.k.a., nonsense shit."

== Charts ==
Chart performance for "Calling for You"
Chart (2023)	Peak position
Australia (ARIA)	17
Australia Hip Hop/R&B (ARIA)	7
Canada Hot 100 (Billboard)	6
France (SNEP)	55
Global 200 (Billboard)	9
Greece International (IFPI)	10
Iceland (Tónlistinn)	14
Italy (FIMI)	65
Lithuania (AGATA)	40
Luxembourg (Billboard)	16
New Zealand (Recorded Music NZ)	21
Portugal (AFP)	33
South Africa Streaming (TOSAC)	6
Sweden (Sverigetopplistan)	85
UAE (IFPI)	14
UK Audio Streaming (Official Charts)	19
US Billboard Hot 100	5
US Hot R&B/Hip-Hop Songs (Billboard)	5
