= Want Me Dead =

2023 song by Young Thug featuring 21 Savage

Song by Young Thug featuring 21 Savage

from the album Business Is Business
- Released: June 23, 2023
- Length: 3:14
- Label: YSL; 300; Atlantic
- Songwriters: Jeffery Williams; Shéyaa Abraham-Joseph; Leland Wayne; Allen Ritter; Andre Proctor; David Ruoff; Elias Klughammer
- Producers: Metro Boomin; Ritter; Dre Moon; David x Eli

"Want Me Dead" is a song by American rapper Young Thug from his third studio album Business Is Business (2023). It features Atlanta-based rapper 21 Savage and was produced by Metro Boomin, Allen Ritter, Dre Moon and David x Eli.

== Content ==
In the song, Young Thug sings about enemies wanting him dead, adding his wish to bring back friends from the dead. 21 Savage raps about his friends and gang activity.

== Critical reception ==
Mark Braboy of Rolling Stone stated Young Thug's overall performance "brings to mind top-shelf moments of the past". Paul A. Thompson of Pitchfork wrote in regard to the song that "Thug writes with such rawness that it at times feels voyeuristic to listen." In addition, he commented the release of Metro Boomin's version of Business Is Business "pays off with 'Want Me Dead'".

== Controversy ==
Young Thug's line from the song "I'm gettin' head from Ch—, I meant CC / My nigga ain't even tryna hit sweetie (Nah) / That bitch turn me off, no kizzy (No kizzy)" was perceived by fans to be a diss toward rapper Saweetie. Thug revealed on Twitter it was not the case and also that the song is six years old.

== Charts ==
Chart performance for "Want Me Dead"
Chart (2023)	Peak position
Canada Hot 100 (Billboard)	77
Global 200 (Billboard)	195
New Zealand Hot Singles (RMNZ)	13
US Billboard Hot 100	59
US Hot R&B/Hip-Hop Songs (Billboard)	9
