= Walk Em Down (Don't Kill Civilians) =

2022 song by Metro Boomin and 21 Savage featuring Mustafa

Song by Metro Boomin and 21 Savage featuring Mustafa

from the album Heroes & Villains
- Released: December 2, 2022
- Genre: Horrorcore; R&B
- Length: 5:11
- Label: Boominati; Republic
- Songwriters: Leland Wayne; Shayaa Abraham-Joseph; Mustafa Ahmed; Carlton Mays, Jr.; Peter Lee Johnson; Simon Hessman
- Producers: Metro Boomin; Honorable C.N.O.T.E.; Johnson; Simon on the Moon

Music video
- "Walk Em Down (Don't Kill Civilians)" on YouTube

"Walk Em Down (Don't Kill Civilians)" is a song by American record producer Metro Boomin and Atlanta-based rapper 21 Savage featuring Canadian poet and singer Mustafa from the former's second studio album Heroes & Villains (2022). It was produced by Metro, Honorable C.N.O.T.E., Peter Lee Johnson, and Simon on the Moon.

== Composition ==
The song contains audio from Gucci Mane's 2007 documentary Hood Affairs. Over "sinister"-sounding piano keys in his signature horrorcore style and an "icy, monotone delivery", 21 Savage lyrically depicts gun and street violence and his determination to retaliate against the opposition. Midway through, the production shifts to a piano-backed, choir-lined instrumental, over which Mustafa sings about the trauma and turmoil that occurs as a result of the violence.

== Critical reception ==
The song received generally positive reviews. Hamza Riaz of Mic Cheque considered it one of the "bone-chilling cuts" from Heroes & Villains, although also an example of which "When there is a new voice, they are shoehorned onto a disconnected strand of a track that would've benefited without it". Wongo Okon of Uproxx commented that Metro Boomin "shines as a conductor" in the song. Complex's Peter A. Berry regarded the hook (performed by 21 Savage) as "simple, yet symbolic enough to be anthemic". Slant Magazine's Charles Lyons-Burt was favorable toward the song spotlighting a lesser-known artist (Mustafa), writing that through this approach, "the album might have felt a bit less redundant with 2018's Not All Heroes Wear Capes, which featured many of the same artists."

== Music video ==
A music video for the song was released 2 years and 1 day after the album was originally released, on December 3, 2024.

== Charts ==
Chart performance for "Walk Em Down (Don't Kill Civilians)"
Chart (2022)	Peak position
Canada Hot 100 (Billboard)	28
Global 200 (Billboard)	59
US Billboard Hot 100	52
US Hot R&B/Hip-Hop Songs (Billboard)	19

== Certifications ==
Certifications for "Walk Em Down (Don't Kill Civilians)"
Region	Certification	Certified units/sales
Canada (Music Canada)	Gold	40,000^{‡}
^{‡} Sales+streaming figures based on certification alone.
