= 21 Savage =

Rapper (born 1992)

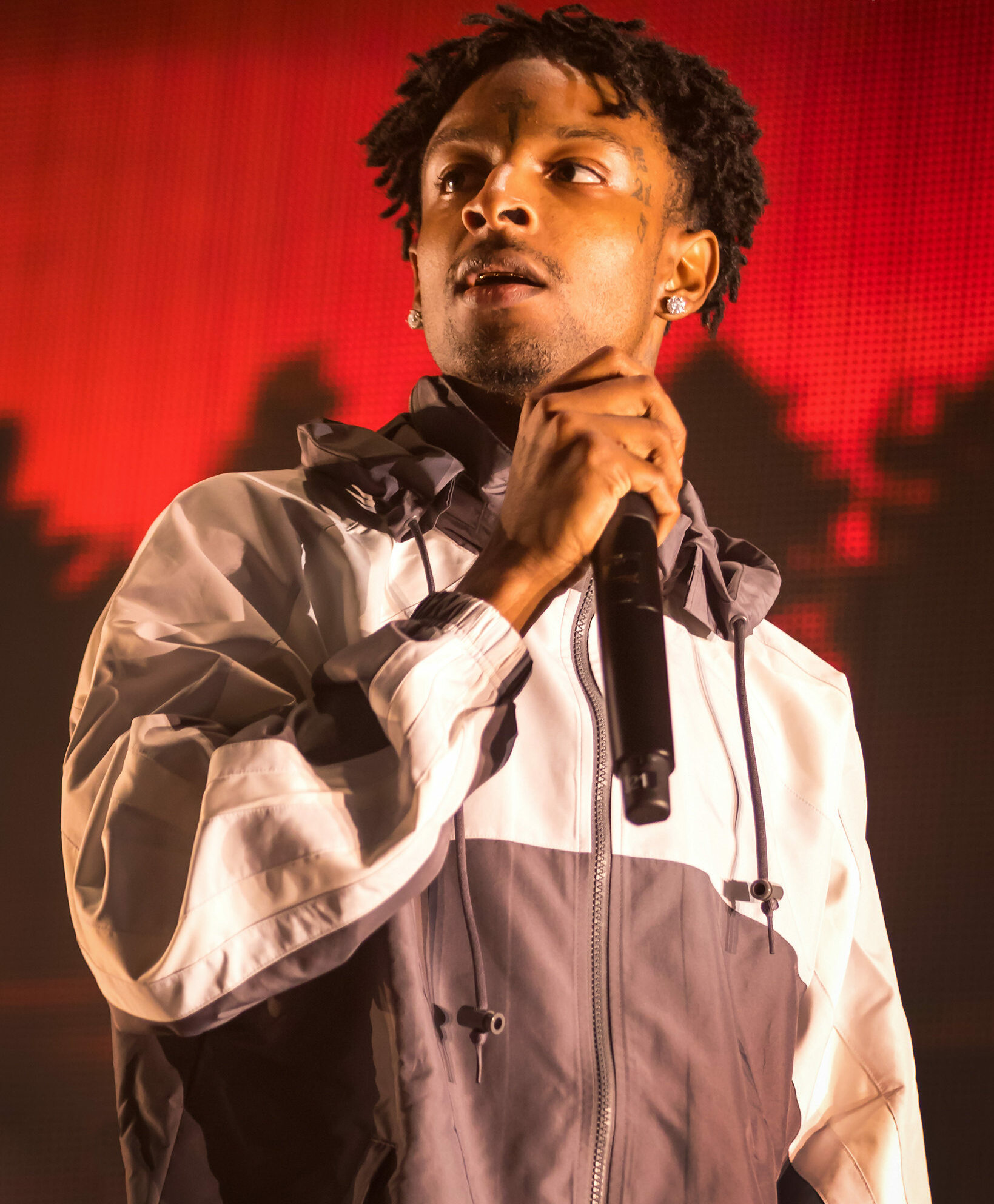
- 21 Savage in 2018
- Born: Shéyaa Bin Abraham-Joseph; October 22, 1992 (age 34); Plaistow, London, England
- Citizenship: United Kingdom
- Occupations: Rapper; songwriter; record producer
- Years active: 2013–present
- Works: Discography
- Partner: Latto (2020–present)
- Children: 4
- Relatives: Young Nudy (cousin)
- Musical career
- Origin: Atlanta, Georgia, U.S.
- Genres: Southern hip-hop; trap; mumble rap
- Labels: Slaughter Gang; RED; Epic
- Website: 21savage.com

Shéyaa Bin Abraham-Joseph (born October 22, 1992), known professionally as 21 Savage, is a rapper based in Atlanta, Georgia. Born in London and raised in the US, he began his recording career in 2013 and released three independent mixtapes to regional acclaim. His breakout project—the collaborative extended play (EP) with record producer Metro Boomin titled Savage Mode (2016)—peaked at number 23 on the Billboard 200. Its lead singles, "X" (featuring Future) and "No Heart" both peaked within the top 40 of the Billboard Hot 100. Later that year, he saw further recognition for his guest appearance on Drake's single "Sneakin'". He then signed a recording contract with Epic Records in January 2017.

21 Savage's debut studio album, Issa Album (2017), peaked at number two on the Billboard 200, while its lead single, "Bank Account" peaked at number 12 on the Billboard Hot 100. That same year, he released the collaborative album Without Warning (2017) with Metro Boomin and fellow Georgia-based rapper Offset, and guest appeared on Post Malone's 2017 single "Rockstar", which peaked atop the Billboard Hot 100 and received two nominations—Record of the Year and Best Rap/Sung Performance—at the 61st Annual Grammy Awards. His second album, I Am > I Was (2018), became his first to debut atop the Billboard 200 and spawned the single "A Lot" (featuring J. Cole), which won Best Rap Song at the 62nd Annual Grammy Awards. The following year, he and Metro Boomin released a sequel to their breakout EP with Savage Mode II (2020), which also debuted atop the Billboard 200 and spawned the top ten-singles "Runnin" and "Mr. Right Now" (featuring Drake). He guest appeared on Drake's 2022 single "Jimmy Cooks", which marked his first song to debut atop the Hot 100 and second to do so overall. Later that year, he and Drake released the collaborative album Her Loss (2022), which saw continued success as his third project to peak the Billboard 200. His third album, American Dream (2024), became his fourth consecutive chart-topping project, and spawned the Billboard Hot 100 top-ten songs "Redrum" and "Née-Nah".

21 Savage was arrested by U.S. Immigration and Customs Enforcement (ICE) on February 3, 2019. Officials revealed his status as a British citizen who entered the U.S. in July 2005 and unlawfully overstayed an H-4 visa that expired in 2006. He was granted bond on February 12 and released the next day, pending the outcome of an expedited deportation hearing, which was initially scheduled for April 9, but was later postponed indefinitely, with 21 Savage's lawyers stating he was legally residing in the U.S. for several years prior to the 2005 H-4 visa. In 2023, 21 Savage became a lawful permanent resident of the United States and received his green card.

== Early life ==
Shéyaa Bin Abraham-Joseph was born on October 22, 1992 at Newham University Hospital in Plaistow, London, to British parents Heather Carmillia Joseph and Kevin Cornelius Emmons. His family is of Caribbean descent; his mother's family is from Dominica, and his father's is from Saint Vincent and the Grenadines, while his paternal grandfather was Haitian. Abraham-Joseph considers himself African-American. American rapper Young Nudy is his cousin. His father and twin sisters, dance choreographers Kyra and Jayda Davis, continue to live in London, where his father works for Westminster City Council.

Abraham-Joseph's parents separated early in his life, and he moved at age seven with his mother to Atlanta, Georgia. In June 2005, at age 12, he returned to the United Kingdom for his uncle's funeral, stayed for a month, and then went back to Atlanta on an H-4 visa on July 22, 2005, which allegedly expired a year later. He had a brother, Quantivayus ("Tay-Man"), who died in a shooting after an attempted drug deal.

In seventh grade at Stone Mountain Middle School, Abraham-Joseph was placed on probation for gun possession. Following a probation violation in eighth grade, he was expelled from the DeKalb County School District. This led him to begin attending schools around the Atlanta metropolitan area before being sent to a juvenile detention center. After being released from the juvenile detention center, he completed eighth grade through an alternative program before finishing a semester of high school, but dropped out in his freshman year following multiple exclusions that he said "exhausted" him. After dropping out, he joined a local street gang affiliated with the wider Bloods gang and became a full-time drug dealer, mainly selling cannabis. He also regularly took part in other criminal activities, including robbery and car theft, although he was only arrested once after contraband was found in a car he was driving. In 2011, when he was 19, his right-hand man was killed in a shootout. In 2013, during an attempted robbery on his 21st birthday, Abraham-Joseph was shot six times by rival gang members, and his best friend Johnny was killed.

== Career ==
=== 2013–2015: Early releases, The Slaughter Tape, and Slaughter King ===
Following the death of his friend in a shootout on his 21st birthday, 21 Savage began rapping. His music career was originally subsidized by his deceased friend's uncle, who gave him money for studio time in 2013. On March 1, 2013, 21 Savage's debut single, "I Can't Get Enough" was released. His debut mixtape, The Slaughter Tape, which was released on May 25, 2015. The release made him what Interview Magazine called an "underground hero in Atlanta".

On July 2, 2015, 21 Savage released a collaborative EP, Free Guwop, with Sonny Digital. It is a tribute EP to fellow rapper and influence Gucci Mane. On December 1, 2015, 21 Savage released his second mixtape, Slaughter King.

=== 2016–2017: Savage Mode, Issa Album, and Without Warning ===
In June 2016, 21 Savage was named as one of the "Freshman Class" of 2016 by XXL. On July 15, 2016, 21 Savage released his joint EP Savage Mode with Atlanta-based record producer Metro Boomin. The EP gained international success and peaked at number 23 on the Billboard 200, which became their highest charting EP to date. In November 2016, he was on the cover of The Fader. The Savage Mode single "X" featuring Future was confirmed by Billboard as going platinum in the US, being 21 Savage's first platinum record. On January 18, 2017, 21 Savage announced that he had signed to Epic Records.

In 2017, his debut studio album, Issa Album, debuted at number two on the US Billboard 200. Its lead single, "Bank Account", peaked at number 12 on the Billboard Hot 100. Later that year, he was featured on Post Malone's single "Rockstar", which peaked at number one on the Billboard Hot 100 and broke numerous records. It became 21 Savage's first number-one song and was later certified Diamond by the RIAA.

On October 31, 2017, a collaborative studio album by 21 Savage, Offset, and Metro Boomin titled Without Warning was released. Without Warning debuted at number four on the US Billboard 200 and received generally positive reviews from critics. Its lead single, "Ric Flair Drip" peaked at number 13 on the Billboard Hot 100.

=== 2018–2019: I Am > I Was ===
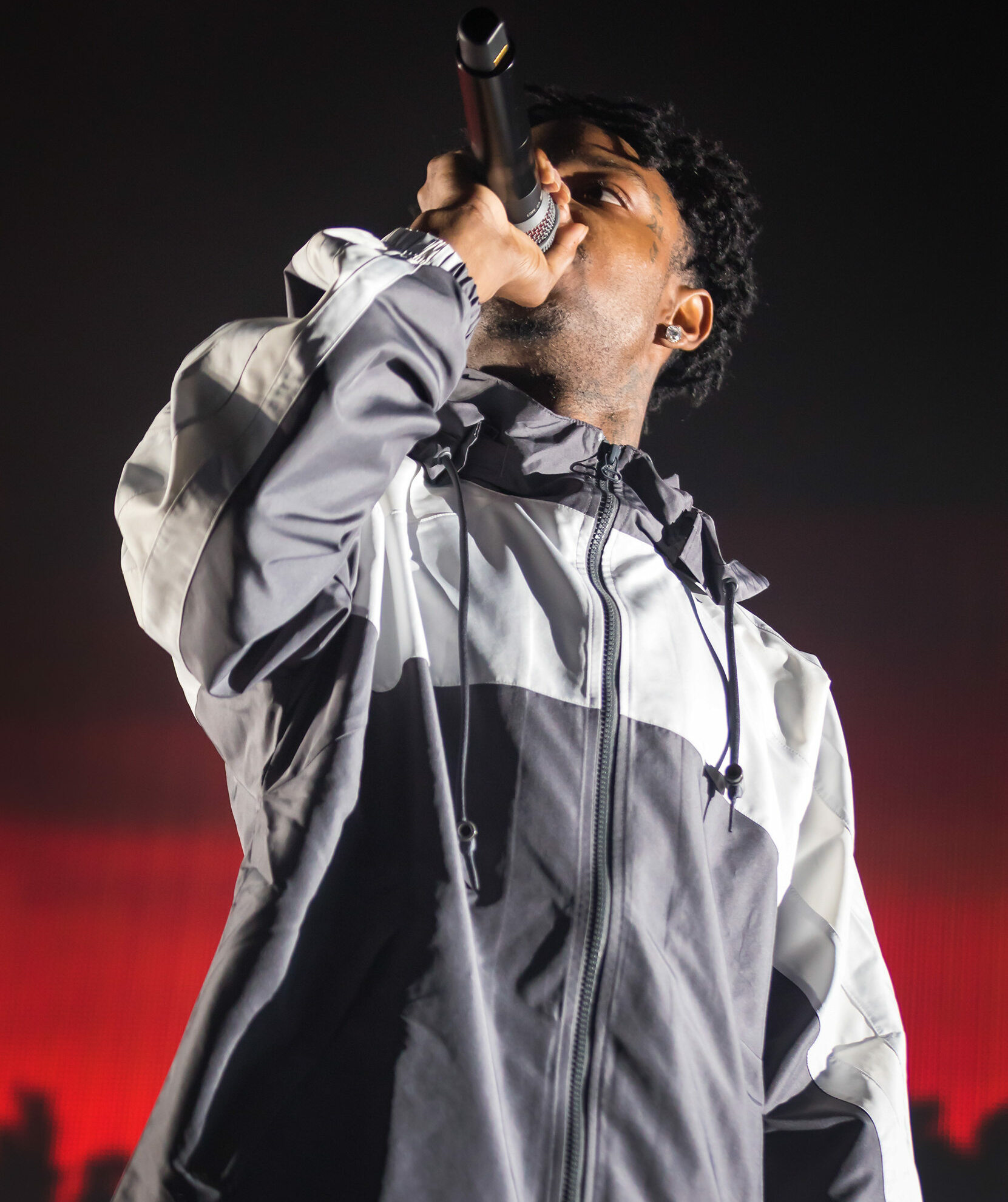
21 Savage in June 2018

In April 2018, 21 Savage had a guest appearance on Young Thug's extended play Hear No Evil along with fellow rappers Nicki Minaj and Lil Uzi Vert. Later that month, he also appeared on the single "Outstanding" by SahBabii. On March 21, 2018, he was featured on the single "Rover 2.0", which is part of BlocBoy JB's Simi mixtape. In the following month, he was featured on Ty Dolla Sign's "Clout", which was part of the deluxe edition of his album Beach House 3.

On October 31, 2018, 21 Savage posted on his Instagram a picture of a man in silhouette jumping in the air in the direction away from a large blaze. In the bottom right corner of the picture there was a "Parental Advisory" notice, as there oftentimes is on the cover of rap releases. 21 Savage also tagged Metro Boomin in the post. For these reasons, some speculated it to be a sequel to 2017's Without Warning album. However, it turned out to be the cover for Metro's debut solo album, Not All Heroes Wear Capes.

On December 6, 2018, 21 Savage posted cover art for his album, I Am > I Was, on Instagram, which features a blurred out image of himself, captioning the image with a number of goat emojis. The next day, 21 Savage took to Twitter and his Instagram story to apologize that he "forgot" to release the album, saying on Twitter: "Dam I forgot to drop my album my bad y'all". He announced a new date of December 21, 2018. The track-list was leaked by record producer Louis Bell via his Instagram story on December 13, 2018. 21 Savage released his second studio album I Am > I Was on December 21, 2018, with features from Travis Scott, Post Malone, Childish Gambino, Offset, J. Cole, Gunna, Lil Baby, Project Pat, Yung Miami, and Schoolboy Q. None of those acts, however, are credited as artists on the album. I Am > I Was debuted at number one on the US Billboard 200, earning 131,000 album-equivalent units (including 18,000 pure album sales), making it 21 Savage's first US number one album. It was led by "A Lot", featuring vocals from J. Cole. The song peaked at number 12 on the US Billboard Hot 100 and earned 21 Savage his first Grammy award. Through 2019, 21 Savage released only one song named "Immortal".

=== 2020–2023: Savage Mode II, Spiral soundtrack, and Her Loss ===
In February 2020, 21 Savage and longtime collaborator Metro Boomin hinted at the release of a sequel to their Savage Mode extended play called Savage Mode II. On September 28, 2020, a teaser trailer for Savage Mode II, directed by Gibson Hazard was released, with a narration from Morgan Freeman, announcing the release date of October 2. The collaborative album peaked at number one on the Billboard 200, debuting with 171,000 first week sales. The album included two top-ten singles, "Runnin", and "Mr. Right Now", featuring Drake.

In April 2021, 21 Savage announced the release of his new EP, Spiral, serving as the official soundtrack to the film Spiral: From the Book of Saw. 21 Savage was featured alongside Justin Bieber on DJ Khaled's April 2021-released single "Let It Go" from Khaled's twelfth studio album, Khaled Khaled. On May 14, 2021, he released an EP titled Spiral, serving as the official soundtrack to the film Spiral: From the Book of Saw. The same day, he was featured on the track "My Life" off of J. Cole's sixth studio album, The Off-Season. The track peaked at number two on the Billboard Hot 100. Months later, in October 2021, Abraham-Joseph appeared as a feature on the remix of Nardo Wick's "Who Want Smoke?" alongside G Herbo and Lil Durk. The track peaked at number seventeen on the Billboard Hot 100 and was certified 3× Platinum by the RIAA. On November 16, 2021, Savage appeared as a feature on Drake's "Knife Talk" alongside Project Pat from his September 2021, Certified Lover Boy. The track peaked at number four on the Billboard Hot 100 and was later certified 5× Platinum by the RIAA.

On January 14, 2022, 21 Savage appeared as a feature alongside Baby Tate on JID's "Surround Sound". On February 4, 2022, 21 Savage was featured on the single "Don't Play That" by Chicago rapper King Von, as the first single for the posthumous album What It Means to Be King. The single was accompanied by a related music video. The tune peaked at number 40 on Billboard Hot 100, and at number 59 on Billboard Global 200. On March 11, 2022, Savage appeared as a feature on Latto's "Wheelie", the third single from her sophomore album, 777. Months later, on June 10, 2022, Savage appeared as a feature alongside Tyler, the Creator on Pharrell Williams' "Cash In Cash Out". Just a week later, on June 17, 2022, 21 Savage appeared as a feature on "Jimmy Cooks", the outro track of Drake's seventh studio album, Honestly, Nevermind. The track debuted at the number one position the Billboard Hot 100, marking Savage's second chart-topping single. The track was later re-released as a single on October 11, 2022. Just over a week later, on October 22, 2022, Drake and 21 Savage released the official music video for "Jimmy Cooks", announcing the release of the two's collaborative studio album, Her Loss, which was released on November 4, 2022. Upon release, the album debuted at number one on the Billboard 200 with 404,000 units, marking Abraham-Joseph's fifth top ten entry and his third consecutive album to top the charts. All sixteen tracks from the album debuted on the Billboard Hot 100, while eight of them appeared in the top ten.

On December 2, 2022, 21 Savage appeared on four tracks from Metro Boomin's sophomore album, Heroes & Villains: "Umbrella" with Young Nudy, "Creepin'" with the Weeknd, "Niagara Falls (Foot or 2)" with Travis Scott, and "Walk Em Down (Don't Kill Civilians)" featuring Mustafa. "Creepin'" was re-released as the lead single from the album on January 27, 2023. The track peaked at number three on the Billboard Hot 100. The track later received a remix featuring Diddy.

On February 28, 2023, Savage appeared on Young Nudy's "Peaches & Eggplants". The track was re-released as the lead single from Nudy's album, Gumbo on May 16, 2023. On March 31, 2023, Savage appeared as a feature alongside DaBaby on Gucci Mane's "06 Gucci". On May 26, 2023, Savage was recruited by Lil Durk as a feature on "War Bout It" from his album Almost Healed. On June 2, 2023, Savage appeared as a feature on two tracks from Metro Boomin's soundtrack album, Spider-Man: Across the Spider-Verse: "Nonviolent Communication" with James Blake and ASAP Rocky, and "Givin' Up (Not the One)" with Don Toliver and 2 Chainz. On the same day, Savage appeared as a feature on Toosii's album, Naujour on the thirteenth cut, "Pull Up".

On June 23, 2023, Savage appeared as a feature on the remix of Burna Boy's "Sittin' on Top of the World". The remix received a nomination for Best Melodic Rap Performance at the 66th Annual Grammy Awards. On the same day, Savage appeared as a feature on two tracks from Young Thug's third studio album, Business Is Business: "Wit da Racks" with Travis Scott and Yak Gotti, and "Want Me Dead". Just weeks later, Savage appeared as a feature on two tracks from Travis Scott's fourth studio album, Utopia: "Topia Twins" with Rob49 and "Til Further Notice" with James Blake and Lauryn Hill.

On September 15, 2023, Savage appeared on "Another One of Me" alongside Diddy, the Weeknd, and French Montana. Just a month later, Savage appeared on Drake's "Calling for You" from his eighth studio album, For All the Dogs.

=== 2024–present: American Dream and What Happened to the Streets? ===
On January 8, 2024, 21 Savage announced that a biopic titled American Dream: The 21 Savage Story was coming soon and was set to feature himself, Donald Glover and Caleb McLaughlin as the leads. However, on January 24, Savage confirmed on Shannon Sharpe's podcast, Club Shay Shay that the movie does not exist and its "trailer" is a parody.

On January 10, 2024, Savage announced his third studio album American Dream. On January 12, 2024, the album was released and featured guest appearances from Travis Scott, Young Thug, Doja Cat, Brent Faiyaz, Ye, Lil Durk, Summer Walker, Mariah the Scientist, Burna Boy and Metro Boomin. Upon release, the album debuted at number one on the Billboard 200 with 133,000 units, marking Abraham-Joseph's sixth top ten entry and his fourth consecutive album to top the charts. American Dream was supported by the singles "Redrum" and "N.H.I.E." with Doja Cat, both of which debuted at number five and nineteen on the Billboard Hot 100, respectively. The Travis Scott and Metro Boomin-assisted "Née-Nah" debuted at the number ten position on the chart. Burna Boy's single "Sittin' On Top of the World", which features Savage, received a nomination for Best Melodic Rap Performance at the 66th Annual Grammy Awards. Burna Boy performed the song at the ceremony on February 4, 2024, alongside 21 Savage and Brandy, whose 1998 single "Top of the World" was heavily sampled in the single.

On December 7, 2025, 21 Savage began teasing his fourth studio album titled What Happened to the Streets?. The album was released on December 12, 2025. It featured guest appearances from Young Nudy, Latto, GloRilla, Drake, G Herbo, Metro Boomin, Lil Baby, and Jawan Harris.

== Musical style ==
Called "one of the last real street niggas left making music" by frequent collaborator Metro Boomin, 21 Savage's music is heavily autobiographic with an emphasis on violent and criminal aspects of his past, including alleged murder and drug dealing. Vocally, he is known for his "trademark villainous monotone drawl". His musical style is influenced by Three 6 Mafia.

== Philanthropy ==
In early August 2016, 2017, 2018, and 2019, 21 Savage hosted the "Issa Back to School Drive" (named after his album Issa Album) in his home neighborhood in Atlanta. The drive gave free haircuts, hairstyles, supplies, and school uniforms.

In March 2018, 21 Savage announced the creation of the 21 Savage Bank Account Campaign (named after his hit song "Bank Account") on The Ellen DeGeneres Show, he also announced that he was donating $21,000 to the cause. He stated, "I started the 21 Savage Bank Account Campaign and it's to help kids learn how to save money and make money, and open bank accounts for kids." Four months later, he donated $10,000 to Atlanta's Continental Colony Elementary School to fund an anti-bullying campaign.

On July 1, 2020, 21 Savage announced he was launching a free online financial literacy education program for kids and teenagers stuck at home during the COVID-19 pandemic, saying, "I feel like it's important more than ever to give our next generation the tools to succeed in life." The program includes a partnership with Atlanta mayor Keisha Lance Bottoms to provide free tablets and WiFi to underserved students in Atlanta.

== Personal life ==
21 Savage is a father of four. He shares two sons, born in 2013 and 2015, with Keyanna Joseph, and has a daughter, also born in 2015, from another relationship.

21 Savage and his mother are both adherents of the traditional West African religion Ifá. In June 2017, he started dating model Amber Rose, but had separated in May 2018. In October 2017, he began taking flying lessons in a Cirrus SR20 single-engine aircraft.

In 2018, 21 Savage reportedly started a movement called "Guns Down, Paintballs Up" which was intended to reduce gun violence by suggesting the use of paintball guns instead of lethal firearms. The head of the Detroit Police Department, James Craig, described the movement as "well-intentioned, however, misguided", after several incidents involving paintball guns later resulted in injuries, disorderly conduct involving large groups of people with paintball guns, property vandalism (e.g., of police vehicles), violent reprisals, and the mistaking of paintball guns for firearms. The movement has been linked to several cases of property crime and homicide. 21 Savage has not commented on the matter, although he paid for the funeral of a 3-year-old who was killed in a related incident.

"ASMR", a song from 21 Savage's second studio album I Am > I Was, caused some controversy with its lyrics. The lyrics included the line, "We been gettin' that Jewish money, everything is kosher." The lyrics came under fire for perpetuating negative Jewish stereotypes when LeBron James shared an Instagram story quoting the track. 21 Savage later apologized, saying on Twitter, "The Jewish people I know are very wise with there [sic] money so that's why I said we been gettin' Jewish money. I never thought anyone would take offense, I'm sorry if I offended everybody, never my intention – I love all people with all my heart."

In November 2020, 21 Savage's half brother, Terrell Davis ("TM1Way"), was stabbed to death in Lambeth, London.

In September 2025, Latto confirmed her relationship with 21 Savage, after rumors of them being romantically linked. In March 2026, Latto announced that she and 21 Savage are expecting a child together. Their daughter had been born by May 30, 2026.

=== Feuds ===
In early 2020, a feud between 21 Savage and American producer Young Chop arose after Chop insulted 21 Savage on an Instagram livestream. On April 6, while reportedly taking an Uber in 21 Savage's neighborhood in an attempt to find where he lived, Chop stated that an unknown gunman fired at his car, but he was not injured. No other sources have confirmed whether or not this story is true and no gunshots were captured on the video in which he made the accusation.

== Legal issues ==
21 Savage was convicted of felony drug charges in October 2014 in Fulton County, Georgia.

Controversy arose after 21 Savage pulled out a firearm during a pool party on June 10, 2018. 21 Savage had been given the firearm by a friend after seeing an opposing crew member pull out a pistol.

On February 15, 2019, 21 Savage turned himself in to authorities and was booked into a south Georgia jail in response to a warrant for his arrest for felony theft by deception. This dispute surrounds a gig arranged in 2016 for which the rapper allegedly accepted a payment of $17,000 to appear at a concert, but did not appear and did not give back the money. He was released on his own recognizance, pending a court hearing on a later date to resolve the charge.

=== Illegal immigration charges ===
On February 3, 2019, just two days after releasing the music video for his single "A Lot", 21 Savage was taken into custody by the U.S. Immigration and Customs Enforcement (ICE) after a vehicle was pulled over that contained him and his cousin, Young Nudy, and two other men. Young Nudy and the two other men had been targeted in an operation involving charges of aggravated assault and violation of the Georgia Gang Act. 21 Savage later alleged that he was personally also targeted in the operation. After his arrest, ICE revealed that 21 Savage is a British national who has been in the United States unlawfully since his non-immigrant visa expired in July 2006. 21 Savage's management team expresses he has been trying to get his visa renewed since the year 2017. Before this, 21 Savage had commonly been believed to be a native of the Atlanta area – e.g., Interview magazine had reported in an interview with Seth Rogen in April 2018 that the rapper's birthplace was Atlanta, Georgia, and in a 2016 interview with XXL, he said he was from Decatur, Georgia in the Atlanta metropolitan area.

A spokesperson for ICE said of 21 Savage, "His whole public persona is false. He actually came to the U.S. from the U.K. as a teen and overstayed his visa." A birth certificate then surfaced showing that 21 Savage was born in Newham, London on October 22, 1992, which indicates that he had been 12 years old in July 2005 – not "a teen." Moreover, he had first entered the U.S. at age 7, only leaving in 2005 to attend his uncle's funeral and re-entering that same year. His attorney acknowledged that 21 Savage had overstayed the expired visa, but said that he had not attempted to hide his background, and said that the Department of Homeland Security had been aware that in 2017 he had applied for a U visa – a non-immigrant visa offered to crime victims and their family members who assist law enforcement officials in the investigation or prosecution of criminal activity.

21 Savage was released from ICE's custody on February 13, 2019. An immigration hearing for his case was scheduled for April 9 of the same year, but postponed indefinitely due to court backlogs. 21 Savage's immigration case was further delayed after he was charged with other crimes in January 2022.

On October 5, 2023, rapper Drake released the single "8AM in Charlotte", on which he claimed that 21 Savage had received a green card. 21 Savage and his attorney confirmed the claim the following day.

=== Lawsuits ===
In November 2022, 21 Savage and Drake were sued by Condé Nast, the publisher of Vogue magazine, for using the Vogue name without permission to promote their collaborative album Her Loss.

== Discography ==
Studio albums

- Issa Album (2017)
- I Am > I Was (2018)
- American Dream (2024)
- What Happened to the Streets? (2025)

Collaborative albums

- Without Warning (with Offset and Metro Boomin) (2017)
- Savage Mode II (with Metro Boomin) (2020)
- Her Loss (with Drake) (2022)

== Filmography ==
21 Savage has also worked on a YouTube animated mini-series named Year 2100.

=== Video games ===
Year	Title	Role	Notes
2023	Call of Duty: Modern Warfare II	Himself	Playable Character (DLC); Voice and Likeness

== Tours ==
Headlining

- Issa Tour (2017)
- Numb the Pain Tour (2017)
- I Am > I Was Tour (2019)
- American Dream Tour (2024)

Co-headlining

- The Off-Season Tour (2021) (with J. Cole)
- It's All a Blur Tour (2023) (with Drake)

Opening act

- HiHorse'd Tour (2016) (with Young Thug)
- Beerbongs & Bentleys Tour (2018) (with Post Malone)

== Awards and nominations ==
Awards	Year	Nominee	Category	Result	Ref.
American Music Awards	2018	"Rockstar" (with Post Malone)	Favorite Rap/Hip Hop Song	Nominated	
American Music Awards	2018	"Rockstar" (with Post Malone)	Collaboration of the Year	Nominated	
Berlin Music Video Awards	2024	"Redrum"	Best Director	Nominated	
BET Awards	2017	Himself	Best New Artist	Nominated	
BET Awards	2018	"Bartier Cardi" (with Cardi B)	Best Collaboration	Nominated	
BET Awards	2019	Himself	Best Male Hip Hop Artist	Nominated	
BET Awards	2019	"A Lot" (with J. Cole)	Video of the Year	Nominated	
BET Awards	2019	"A Lot" (with J. Cole)	Best Collaboration	Nominated	
BET Awards	2021	Himself & Metro Boomin	Best Group	Nominated	
BET Awards	2023	Her Loss (with Drake)	Album of the Year	Nominated	
BET Awards	2023	Himself & Drake	Best Group	Won	
BET Awards	2023	"Creepin'" (with Metro Boomin, the Weeknd)	Best Collaboration	Nominated	
BET Awards	2023	Himself	Best Male Hip Hop Artist	Nominated	
BET Awards	2023	"Jimmy Cooks" (with Drake)	Viewer's Choice Award	Nominated	
BET Awards	2024	Himself	Best Male Hip Hop Artist	Nominated	
BET Awards	2024	American Dream	Album of the Year	Nominated	
BET Awards	2024	"Good Good" (with Usher & Summer Walker)	Video of the Year	Nominated	
BET Awards	2024	"Good Good" (with Usher & Summer Walker)	Best Collaboration	Nominated	
BET Hip Hop Awards	2018	"Bartier Cardi"	Best Featured Verse	Nominated	
BET Hip Hop Awards	2018	"Ric Flair Drip" (with Offset and Metro Boomin)	Best Collabo, Duo or Group	Nominated	
BET Hip Hop Awards	2018	"Rockstar" (with Post Malone)	Best Collabo, Duo or Group	Nominated	
BET Hip Hop Awards	2019	"A Lot" (with J. Cole)	Best Hip Hop Video	Nominated	
BET Hip Hop Awards	2019	"A Lot" (with J. Cole)	Best Collabo, Duo or Group	Nominated	
BET Hip Hop Awards	2019	"A Lot" (with J. Cole)	Impact Track	Nominated	
BET Hip Hop Awards	2019	"Wish Wish"	Best Featured Verse	Nominated	
BET Hip Hop Awards	2021	Himself & Metro Boomin	Best Duo/Group	Nominated	
BET Hip Hop Awards	2021	Savage Mode II (with Metro Boomin)	Hip Hop Album of the Year	Nominated	
BET Hip Hop Awards	2021	"Mr. Right Now" (with Drake & Metro Boomin)	Best Collaboration	Nominated	
BET Hip Hop Awards	2022	"Jimmy Cooks" (with Drake)	Best Collaboration	Nominated	
BET Hip Hop Awards	2023	Himself	Hip Hop Artist of the Year	Nominated	
BET Hip Hop Awards	2023	Himself	Lyricist of the Year	Nominated	
BET Hip Hop Awards	2023	Himself	Hustler of the Year	Nominated	
BET Hip Hop Awards	2023	Himself & Drake	Best Duo/Group	Won	
BET Hip Hop Awards	2023	Her Loss (with Drake)	Hip Hop Album of the Year	Won	
BET Hip Hop Awards	2023	"Spin Bout U" (with Drake)	Best Hip Hop Video	Nominated	
BET Hip Hop Awards	2023	"Sittin' on Top of the World" (with Burna Boy)	Best Hip Hop Video	Nominated	
BET Hip Hop Awards	2023	"Sittin' on Top of the World" (with Burna Boy)	Best Collaboration	Nominated	
BET Hip Hop Awards	2023	"Sittin' on Top of the World" (with Burna Boy)	Song of the Year	Nominated	
BET Hip Hop Awards	2023	"Rich Flex" (with Drake)	Song of the Year	Nominated	
BET Hip Hop Awards	2023	"Sittin' on Top of the World"	Best Featured Verse	Nominated	
BET Hip Hop Awards	2023	"Creepin'"	Best Featured Verse	Nominated	
BET Hip Hop Awards	2024	Himself	Hip Hop Artist of the Year	Nominated	
BET Hip Hop Awards	2024	Himself	Lyricist of the Year	Nominated	
BET Hip Hop Awards	2024	American Dream	Album of the Year	Nominated	
BET Hip Hop Awards	2024	"Good Good"	Sweet 16: Best Featured Verse	Nominated	
Billboard Music Awards	2018	Himself	Top New Artist	Nominated	
Billboard Music Awards	2018	"Rockstar" (with Post Malone)	Top Hot 100 Song	Nominated	
Billboard Music Awards	2018	"Rockstar" (with Post Malone)	Top Streaming Song (Audio)	Nominated	
Billboard Music Awards	2018	"Rockstar" (with Post Malone)	Top Collaboration	Nominated	
Billboard Music Awards	2018	"Rockstar" (with Post Malone)	Top Rap Song	Won	
Billboard Music Awards	2022	"Knife Talk" (with Drake and Project Pat)	Top Rap Song	Nominated	
Billboard Music Awards	2023	Himself	Top Rap Artist	Nominated	
Billboard Music Awards	2023	Himself	Top Rap Male Artist	Nominated	
Billboard Music Awards	2023	Her Loss (with Drake)	Top Billboard 200 Album	Nominated	
Billboard Music Awards	2023	Her Loss (with Drake)	Top Rap Album	Won	
Billboard Music Awards	2023	"Creepin'" (with Metro Boomin, the Weeknd)	Top Hot 100 Song	Nominated	
Billboard Music Awards	2023	"Creepin'" (with Metro Boomin, the Weeknd)	Top Radio Song	Nominated	
Billboard Music Awards	2023	"Creepin'" (with Metro Boomin, the Weeknd)	Top Collaboration	Won	
Billboard Music Awards	2023	"Creepin'" (with Metro Boomin, the Weeknd)	Top R&B Song	Nominated	
Billboard Music Awards	2023	"Rich Flex" (with Drake)	Top Rap Song	Won	
Billboard Music Awards	2024	American Dream	Top Rap Album	Nominated	
Brit Awards	2023	Drake & 21 Savage	Best International Group	Nominated	
Grammy Awards	2019	"Rockstar" (with Post Malone)	Record of the Year	Nominated	
Grammy Awards	2019	"Rockstar" (with Post Malone)	Best Rap/Sung Performance	Nominated	
Grammy Awards	2020	"A Lot"	Best Rap Song	Won	
Grammy Awards	2020	I Am > I Was	Best Rap Album	Nominated	
Grammy Awards	2022	"My Life" (with J. Cole and Morray)	Best Rap Performance	Nominated	
Grammy Awards	2022	"My Life" (with J. Cole and Morray)	Best Rap Song	Nominated	
Grammy Awards	2024	"Rich Flex" (with Drake)	Best Rap Song	Nominated	
Grammy Awards	2024	"Rich Flex" (with Drake)	Best Rap Performance	Nominated	
Grammy Awards	2024	"Spin Bout U" (with Drake)	Best Melodic Rap Performance	Nominated	
Grammy Awards	2024	"Sittin' on Top of the World" (with Burna Boy)	Best Melodic Rap Performance	Nominated	
Grammy Awards	2024	Her Loss (with Drake)	Best Rap Album	Nominated	
iHeartRadio Music Awards	2018	Himself	Best New Hip-hop Artist	Nominated	
iHeartRadio Music Awards	2018	"Rockstar" (with Post Malone)	Hip-Hop Song of the Year	Nominated	
iHeartRadio Music Awards	2023	Her Loss (with Drake)	Hip-Hop Album of the Year	Won	
iHeartRadio Music Awards	2024	Himself	Hip-Hop Artist of the Year	Nominated	
iHeartRadio Music Awards	2024	"Creepin'" (with Metro Boomin, the Weeknd)	Song of the Year	Nominated	
iHeartRadio Music Awards	2024	"Creepin'" (with Metro Boomin, the Weeknd)	Best Collaboration	Nominated	
iHeartRadio Music Awards	2024	"Creepin'" (with Metro Boomin, the Weeknd)	R&B Song of the Year	Nominated	
iHeartRadio Music Awards	2024	"Good Good" (with Usher & Summer Walker)	Best Collaboration	Nominated	
iHeartRadio Music Awards	2024	"Good Good" (with Usher & Summer Walker)	R&B Song of the Year	Nominated	
iHeartRadio Music Awards	2024	"Rich Flex" (with Drake)	Best Collaboration	Nominated	
iHeartRadio Music Awards	2024	"Rich Flex" (with Drake)	Hip-Hop Song of the Year	Nominated	
iHeartRadio Titanium Awards	2018	"Rockstar" (with Post Malone)	1 Billion Total Audience Spins on iHeartRadio Stations	Won	
iHeartRadio Titanium Awards	2023	"Creepin'" (with Metro Boomin, the Weeknd)	1 Billion Total Audience Spins on iHeartRadio Stations	Won	
MTV Europe Music Awards	2018	"Rockstar" (with Post Malone)	Best Song	Nominated	
MTV Europe Music Awards	2023	"Creepin'" (with Metro Boomin, the Weeknd)	Best Collaboration	Nominated	
MTV Video Music Awards	2018	"Rockstar" (with Post Malone)	Song of the Year	Won	
MTV Video Music Awards	2018	"Bartier Cardi"	Best Hip Hop Video	Nominated	
MTV Video Music Awards	2019	"A Lot"	Video of the Year	Nominated	
MTV Video Music Awards	2019	"A Lot"	Best Hip Hop	Nominated	
MTV Video Music Awards	2024	"Good Good" (with Usher & Summer Walker)	Best R&B	Nominated	
Streamy Awards	2017	Himself	Breakthrough Artist	Nominated	

== See also ==
- List of artists who reached number one on the UK Singles Chart
- Relationship of 21 Savage and Drake
