= Metro Boomin production discography =

This is the discography of American record producer, Metro Boomin. It includes a list of songs produced, co-produced and remixed by year, artists, album and title.

== Singles produced ==
Title	Year	Peak chart positions								Certifications	Album
Title	Year	US	US R&B	US Rap	AUS	CAN	GER	NZ	UK	Certifications	Album
"Karate Chop" (Future featuring Lil Wayne)	2013	82	27	23	—	—	—	—	—		Honest
"Honest" (Future)	2013	55	18	15	—	—	—	—	—	RIAA: Platinum	Honest
"I Won" (Future featuring Kanye West)	2014	98	26	17	—	—	—	— (Note: "I Won" did not enter the NZ Top 40 Singles Chart, but peaked at number five on the NZ Heatseekers chart.)	169	RIAA: Gold	Honest
"Tuesday" (ILoveMakonnen featuring Drake)	2014	12	2	—	—	58	—	—	165	RIAA: Platinum; RMNZ: Gold	ILoveMakonnen
"Check" (Meek Mill)	2015	—	37	—	—	—	—	—	—	RIAA: Gold	Dreams Worth More Than Money
"3500" (Travis Scott featuring Future and 2 Chainz)	2015	82	25	16	—	—	—	—	—	RIAA: Platinum	Rodeo
"Where Ya At" (Future featuring Drake)	2015	28	13	11	—	62	—	—	—	RIAA: 4× Platinum; ARIA: Gold; MC: 2× Platinum; BPI: Silver	DS2
"Jumpman" (Drake and Future)	2015	12	3	2	47	44	—	— (Note: "Jumpman" did not enter the NZ Top 40 Singles Chart, but peaked at number four on the NZ Heatseekers chart.)	58	RIAA: 5× Platinum; ARIA: 3× Platinum; MC: Gold; BVMI: Gold; RMNZ: Gold; BPI: Platinum	What a Time to Be Alive
"Father Stretch My Hands Pt. 1" (Kanye West featuring Kid Cudi)	2016	37	14	9	—	51	—	—	54	RIAA: 6× Platinum; BPI: Platinum	The Life of Pablo
"Low Life" (Future featuring the Weeknd)	2016	18	8	5	96	25	—	30	—	RIAA: 8× Platinum; ARIA: Platinum; MC: 2× Platinum; BVMI: Gold; RMNZ: 2× Platinum; BPI: Platinum	Evol
"Wicked" (Future)	2016	41	13	8	93	—	—	—	107	RIAA: Platinum; MC: Platinum	Evol
"You Was Right" (Lil Uzi Vert)	2016	40	27	22	—	—	—	—	—	RIAA: 5× Platinum; BPI: Silver	Lil Uzi Vert vs. the World
"Bad and Boujee" (Migos featuring Lil Uzi Vert)	2016	1	1	1	34	5	65	17	30	RIAA: 4× Platinum; ARIA: 2× Platinum; BVMI: Gold; RMNZ: Gold; BPI: Platinum	Culture
"Bounce Back" (Big Sean)	2016	6	8	6	52	17	—	28	67	RIAA: 6× Platinum; ARIA: 2× Platinum; MC: 2× Platinum; RMNZ: 2× Platinum; BPI: Gold	I Decided
"Both" (Gucci Mane featuring Drake)	2017	41	16	11	—	43	—	—	—	RIAA: 4× Platinum; BPI: Silver	The Return of East Atlanta Santa
"Congratulations" (Post Malone featuring Quavo)	2017	8	5	3	30	14	88	21	28	RIAA: 14× Platinum (Diamond); ARIA: 10× Platinum; MC: Diamond; BVMI: Gold; RMNZ: 2× Platinum; BPI: 2× Platinum	Stoney
"Tunnel Vision" (Kodak Black)	2017	6	4	2	—	17	—	—	—	RIAA: 6× Platinum; RMNZ: Platinum; BPI: Gold	Painting Pictures
"Mask Off" (Future)	2017	5	3	2	13	5	12	6	22	RIAA: 9× Platinum; ARIA: 3× Platinum; MC: Diamond; BVMI: 2× Platinum; RMNZ: Platinum; BPI: 2× Platinum	Future
"Bank Account" (21 Savage)	2017	12	5	4	55	16	—	39	41	RIAA: 6× Platinum; ARIA: 2× Platinum; MC: 8× Platinum; BVMI: Gold; RMNZ: 3× Platinum; BPI: Platinum	Issa Album
"I Get the Bag" (Gucci Mane featuring Migos)	2017	11	5	5	—	28	—	—	—	RIAA: 8× Platinum; BPI: Silver	Mr. Davis
"T'd Up" (Rae Sremmurd)	2018	—	—	—	—	—	—	—	—		SR3MM
"Red Room" (Offset)	2019	49	22	—	—	42	—	12	98	RIAA: Platinum	Father of 4
"Heartless" (The Weeknd)	2019	1	1	—	10	3	36	13	10	RIAA: 3× Platinum; ARIA: 3× Platinum; MC: 3× Platinum; RMNZ: Platinum; BPI: Platinum	After Hours
"Stay Down" (Lil Durk, 6lack and Young Thug)	2020	73	26	—	—	94	—	28	—	RIAA: Gold	The Voice
"Knife Talk" (Drake featuring 21 Savage and Project Pat)	2021	4	2	—	13	6	—	14	87	RIAA: 5× Platinum; ARIA: 2× Platinum; RMNZ: Gold; BPI: Gold	Certified Lover Boy
"Double Fantasy" (The Weeknd featuring Future)	2023	18	8	—	9	7	23	11	14	ARIA: Gold	The Idol Episode 2 (Music from the HBO Original Series)
"Popular" (The Weeknd, Playboi Carti and Madonna)	2023	43	14	—	8	10	21	6	10	RIAA: Platinum; ARIA: 3× Platinum; BVMI: Gold; RMNZ: 2× Platinum; BPI: Platinum	The Highlights (Deluxe)
"Oh U Went" (Young Thug featuring Drake)	2023	19	9	—	—	20	—	5	65		Business Is Business
"Cry for Me" (The Weeknd)	2025	12	4	—	20	8	—	35	8		Hurry Up Tomorrow

== 2011 ==
=== French Montana – Mister 16: Casino Life ===
- 01. "Everything's A Go" (produced with LongLivePrince)
- 12. "Cadillac Doors (Me & U)" (produced with LongLivePrince)

== 2013 ==
=== Ace Hood - Trials & Tribulations ===
- 10. "Pray For Me" (produced with Sonny Digital, TM88 and Southside)
- 19. "Disloyal"

=== Doe B – Baby Jesus ===
- 07. "Patrick Swayze"
- 10. "30 Piece"

=== Ludacris – #IDGAF ===
- 02. "If I Aint F'd Up"
- 03. "Raised In The South" (featuring Young Jeezy)
- 05. "9 Times Out OF 10" (featuring French Montana & Que)

=== DJ Esco – No Sleep ===
- 03. "Day One" (performed by Future featuring Yo Gotti) (produced with 808 Mafia)

== 2014 ==
=== Lil B – Hoop Life ===
- 21. "NBA Live" (produced with 808 Mafia and Young Chop)

=== Ty Dolla $ign – $ign Language ===
1. Dead Presidents [Interlude BJ The Chicago Kid] (featuring Juicy J & Rich Homie Quan)

=== Gucci Mane – East Atlanta Santa ===
- 12. "Riding Dirty" (produced with Doughboy Beatz and Honorable C.N.O.T.E.)

=== Nicki Minaj - The Pinkprint ===
- 07. "Want Some More" (produced with Zaytoven)

=== Travis Scott – Days Before Rodeo ===
- 02. "Mamacita" (featuring Rich Homie Quan and Young Thug) (produced with DJ Dahi and Travis Scott)
- 06. "Sky Fall" (featuring Young Thug) (produced with Travis Scott)
- 09. "Basement Freestyle" (produced with Lex Luger)
- 12. "BACC"

== 2015 ==
=== No Pen No Pad - Rich Homie Quan ===
- 16. "All Around the World" (produced with Zaytoven)

=== Yo Gotti – Concealed ===
- 06. "Ion Feel Em" (featuring Kevin Gates)
- 10. "Hero" (featuring Shy Glizzy)

=== Future – DS2 ===
- 01. "Thought It Was a Drought" (produced with Allen Ritter)
- 02. "I Serve the Base"
- 03. "Where Ya At" (featuring Drake)
- 04. "Groupies" (produced with Sonny Digital and Southside)
- 05. "Lil One" (produced with Southside)
- 07. "Freak Hoe"
- 08. "Rotation" (produced with Southside)
- 09. "Slave Master" (produced with Southside)
- 10. "Blow a Bag" (produced with Sonny Digital and Southside)
- 12. "Rich Sex" (produced with Frank Dukes and Southside)
- 13. "Blood on the Money" (produced with Cassius Jay and Zaytoven)
- 19. "Like I Never Left"

=== Drake & Future – What a Time to Be Alive ===
- 01. "Digital Dash"
- 02. "Big Rings"
- 03. "Live From The Gutter"
- 04. "Diamonds Dancing"
- 05. "Scholarships"
- 07. "I'm The Plug" (produced with Southside)
- 09. "Jumpman"
- 10. "Jersey" (produced with Southside)

=== Travis Scott ===
- 00. High Fashion (featuring Future) (produced with Southside, Wondagurl, Eestbound, and Travis Scott)

=== Kid Ink - Full Speed ===
- 16. "Like a Hott Boy" (featuring Young Thug and Bricc Baby) (produced with DJ Spinz)

=== Da$h – Skrewface ===
- 07. "Mudd Walk"

=== 21 Savage - The Slaughter Tape ===
- 6. "Drip" (produced with TM88)

=== 21 Savage - Slaughter King ===
- 10. "Deserve"

=== Travis Scott – Rodeo ===
- 01. "Pornography" (produced with Sonny Digital, Travis Scott, and Mike Dean)
- 03. "3500" (featuring Future and 2 Chainz) (produced with Mike Dean, Travis Scott, Mano, Zaytoven, and Allen Ritter)
- 04. "Wasted" (featuring Juicy J) (produced with Travis Scott, Frank Dukes, and Mike Dean)
- 07. "Nightcrawler" (featuring Swae Lee and Chief Keef) (produced with Mike Dean, Travis Scott, Southside, TM88, and Allen Ritter)
- 15. "Ok Alright" (featuring Schoolboy Q) (produced with Sonny Digital and Mike Dean)

=== Lil Durk - Remember My Name ===
- 02. "Amber Alert"

=== Uncle Murda and Future ===
- 01. "Right Now"

=== Kourtney Money and Young Nudy - Paradise 2 East Atlanta ===
- 03. "Bitch Ass"

=== Bricc Baby Shitro – Nasty Dealer ===
- 02. "Nasty Dealer"
- 07. "IDK" (featuring Casey Veggies)
- 09. "Thru Wit It" (featuring Young Thug)

=== Pusha T - King Push – Darkest Before Dawn: The Prelude ===
- 01. "Intro" (produced with Sean "Puff Daddy" Combs and G Koop)

=== Young Thug - Slime Season ===
- 11. "Be Me See Me"

=== Young Thug - Slime Season 2 ===
- 06. "All Over" (produced with Southside and TM88)

=== Chief Keef - Finally Rollin 2 ===
- 06. "Obama" (produced with Southside)
- 17. "Jumanji" (produced with Sonny Digital)
- 18. "Where Ya At"

== 2016 ==
=== Uncle Murda ===
- 01. "Right Now" (Remix) (featuring Future, Fabolous, and Jadakiss)

=== Casino – Boss Man Casino 2 ===
- 01. "Casino" (featuring Santana)

=== King Monte Carlo ===
- 01. "Colossal" (featuring Young Thug) (produced with Zaytoven)

=== Lil Uzi Vert - Lil Uzi Vert vs the World ===
- 05. "You Was Right"

=== 21 Savage & Metro Boomin – Savage Mode ===
- 01. "No Advance"
- 02. "No Heart" (produced with Southside and Cubeatz)
- 03. "X" (featuring Future) (produced with 21 Savage)
- 04. "Savage Mode"
- 05. "Bad Guy" (produced with Sonny Digital)
- 06. "Real Nigga"
- 07. "Mad High"
- 08. "Feel It" (produced with Zaytoven)
- 09. "Ocean Drive" (produced with Southside and G Koop)

=== Lil Uzi Vert – The Perfect LUV Tape ===
- 09. "Ronda (Winners)" (produced with Cubeatz)

=== Gucci Mane & Future – Free Bricks 2K16 (Zone 6 Edition) ===
- 03. "Die a Gangster" (produced with Southside)
- 05. "All Shooters" (produced with Southside)

=== Future - Evol ===
- 04. "Xanny Family"
- 05. "Low Life (featuring The Weeknd)
- 12. "Wicked"

=== Hoodrich Pablo Juan - Designer Drugz 2 ===
- 15. "Fish in the Coupe"

=== Tinashe - Nightride ===
- 5. "Sacrifices"
- 11. "Ride of Your Life"

=== Young Thug - I'm Up ===
- 6. "Hercules"

=== The Weeknd – Starboy ===
- 10. "Six Feet Under" (additional vocals from Future) (produced with Ben Billions, Doc McKinney, Cirkut, Eric Bledsoe and The Weeknd)

=== Kanye West - The Life of Pablo ===
- 02. "Father Stretch My Hands, Part 1" (produced with Kanye West, Mike Dean, Allen Ritter, DJDS, and Rick Rubin)
- 10. "Waves" (produced with Charlie Heat, Kanye West, Hudson Mohawke, Mike Dean, and Anthony Killhoffer)
- 18. "Facts (Charlie Heat Version)" (produced with Charlie Heat, Kanye West, and Southside)

=== Lil B ===
- 00. My House^{[b]}

=== Young Nudy - Slimeball ===
- 02. "Ain't Playin'"

=== Curren$y - Andretti 11/30 ===
- 07. "Fed Ex" (produced with Don Cannon)

== 2017 ==
=== Shy Glizzy – The World Is Yours ===
- 02. "Errywhere"

=== Juicy J - Rubba Band Business ===
- 02. "Feed the Streets" (featuring Project Pat)
- 06. "Drop a Bag" (featuring G.O.D.)

=== Big Sean – I Decided. ===
- 03. "Bounce Back" (produced with Hitmaka, Smash David, and Amaire Johnson)
- 10. "Voices in My Head / Stick to the Plan" (produced with DJ Dahi, DJ Khalil and Amaire Johnson)
- 13. "Sacrifices" (featuring Migos) (produced with Allen Ritter)

=== Young Nudy - Slimeball 2 ===
- 07. "Burn Ya"

=== Nephew Texas Boy – The Pack Landed At 8:08 ===
- 01. "The Pack Landed @ 8:08" (produced with TM88)

=== BeatKing and Nephew Texas Boy – Texlanta 2 ===
- 05. "Get Like Me" (produced with TM88 and Sonny Digital)
- 12. "Ain't The Same"

=== Zach Farlow – Over Til It's Over ===
- 05. "Go F.A.R." (produced with Southside)
- 06. "Round Here"

=== Future – Future ===
- 07. "Mask Off"
- 10. "Scrape"

=== Future – HNDRXX ===
- 01. "My Collection" (produced with Cubeatz)
- 17. "Sorry" (produced with Cubeatz)

=== Kodak Black - Painting Pictures ===
- 10. Tunnel Vision (produced with Southside and Cubeatz)

=== Nav – Nav ===
- 06. "Up" (produced with Nav)

=== Starlito – Manifest Destiny ===
- 01. "Too Much" (produced with Doughboy Beatz)

=== Young Scooter – Jugg King ===
- 08. "Cook Up" (featuring Young Thug) (produced with Zaytoven)

=== Block 125 – Quarter Key ===
- 04. "Lotta Money" (featuring Offset) (produced with Zaytoven)

=== Hoodrich Pablo Juan and Drugrixh Peso – MONYPOWRSPT World Rules ===
- 07. "I Need 2"

=== Casino – Boss Man Casino 3 ===
- 03. "Shut The F*ck Up" (featuring Quis)

=== Hoodrich Pablo Juan - Designer Drugz 3 ===
- 09. "I Do This"

=== Lil Uzi Vert - Luv Is Rage 2 ===
- 13. "X" (produced with Pi'erre Bourne and Maaly Raw)

=== Gucci Mane ===
- 01. "Both" (featuring Drake & Lil Wayne) [Remix](produced with Southside)

=== Post Malone ===
- 00. "Congratulations (Remix)" (featuring Quavo and Future) (produced with Frank Dukes and Bell)

=== Metro Boomin ===
- 00. "No Complaints" (featuring Offset and Drake)

=== 21 Savage – Issa Album ===
- 01. "Famous" (produced with Zaytoven)
- 02. "Bank Account" (produced with 21 Savage)
- 03. "Close My Eyes"
- 06. "Thug Life"
- 08. "Nothin New" (produced with Zaytoven)
- 09. "Numb"
- 11. "Money Convo"
- 13. "Whole Lot" (featuring Young Thug)
- 14. "7 Min Freestyle" (produced with Southside)

=== Lecrae – All Things Work Together ===
- 06. "Hammer Time" (featuring 1k Phew)

=== Gunna ===
- 00. "Mind on a Milli" (featuring Hoodrich Pablo Juan) (produced with Pi'erre Bourne and Wheezy)

=== 21 Savage, Offset and Metro Boomin – Without Warning ===
- 01. "Ghostface Killers" (featuring Travis Scott)
- 02. "Rap Saved Me" (featuring Quavo)
- 03. "Ric Flair Drip" (performed by Offset and Metro Boomin) (produced with Bijan Amir)
- 04. "My Choppa Hate Niggas" (performed by 21 Savage and Metro Boomin) (produced with CuBeatz)
- 05. "Nightmare" (performed by Offset and Metro Boomin)
- 06. "Mad Stalkers" (produced with Dre Moon)
- 07. "Disrespectful"
- 08. "Run Up the Racks" (performed by 21 Savage and Metro Boomin) (produced with Southside)
- 09. "Still Serving" (produced with CuBeatz)
- 10. "Darth Vader"

=== Big Sean and Metro Boomin – Double or Nothing ===
- 01. "Go Legend" (featuring Travis Scott)
- 02. "Big Bidness" (featuring 2 Chainz)
- 03. "Who's Stopping Me" (produced with Earlly Mac)
- 04. "Pull Up N Wreck" (featuring 21 Savage) (produced with Southside)
- 05. "So Good" (featuring Kash Doll)
- 06. "Savage Time" (additional vocals from Travis Scott)
- 07. "Even the Odds" (featuring Young Thug) (additional vocals from Gucci Mane)
- 08. "In Tune"
- 09. "Reason" (featuring Swae Lee) (produced with Pi'erre Bourne)
- 10. "No Hearts, No Love"

=== Nav and Metro Boomin - Perfect Timing ===
- 01. "Perfect Timing (Intro)" (produced with Southside)
- 02. "I Don't Care"
- 03. "Hit" (produced with Southside)
- 04. "ASAP Ferg" (featuring Lil Uzi Vert) (produced with Nav)
- 05. "Held Me Down" (produced with Nav and CuBeatz)
- 06. "Minute" (featuring Playboi Carti and Offset) (produced with Nav and Pi'erre Bourne)
- 07. "Did You See Nav?" (produced with CuBeatz)
- 08. "Bring It Back"
- 09. "Both Sides" (featuring 21 Savage)
- 10. "Call Me"
- 11. "You Know" (featuring Belly)
- 12. "Rich" (produced with Nav)
- 13. "Need Some" (featuring Gucci Mane) (produced with CuBeatz)
- 14. "I Am" (produced with Nav and DannyBoyStyles)
- 15. "NavUziMetro#Pt2" (featuring Lil Uzi Vert) (produced with Nav and Jordan "Trouble" Bacchus)

== 2018 ==
=== Gunna – Drip Season 3 ===
- 01. "Helluva Price"
- 07. "Pedestrian" (produced with Wheezy and Doughboy Beatz)
- 10. "Car Sick" (featuring Nav and Metro Boomin) (produced with Nav)
- 11. "My Soul" (produced with London on da Track)
- 12. "No Joke"

=== Lil Jay Brown - Money Luvin Youngin: The Lick Tape ===
- 07. "Big Mad" (produced with Southside)

=== DJ Esco - Kolorblind ===
- 03. "Chek" (featuring Future) (produced with Dre Moon)

=== Rae Sremmurd – SR3MM ===
- 09. "T'd Up" (produced with ChopsquadDJ)

=== Thompson Twins ===
- 00. "Hold Me Now (Metro Boomin Mix)"

=== Rich The Kid – The World Is Yours ===
- 08. "Lost It" (featuring Offset and Quavo) (produced with Wheezy and Doughboy Beatz)

=== Young Nudy - SlimeBall 3 ===
- 13. "Right Now" (produced with Wheezy)

=== Nicki Minaj - Queen ===
- 09. "Chun Swae" (featuring Swae Lee)
- 16. "Sir" (featuring Future) (produced with Zaytoven)

=== Lil Wayne - Tha Carter V ===
- 22. "Used 2" (produced with Prince 85)

=== Belly - IMMIGRANT ===
- 06. "All for Me"

=== Lil Baby - Street Gossip ===
- 05. "Ready" (with Gunna)

=== Gucci Mane - Evil Genius ===
- 07. "Father's Day"

=== 21 Savage - I Am > I Was ===
- 02. "Break Da Law" (produced with Doughboy & Southside)
- 09. "ASMR" (produced with Kid Hazel)

== 2019 ==
=== Offset - Father of 4 ===
- 01. "Father of 4" (featuring Big Rube)
- 02. "How Did I Get Here" (featuring J. Cole) (produced with Dre Moon)
- 04. "Tats on My Face" (produced with Southside, as SO ICEY BOYZ)
- 06. "Wild Wild West" (featuring Gunna) (produced with Allen Ritter)
- 07. "North Star" (featuring Cee-Lo Green) (produced with Allen Ritter)
- 08. "After Dark" (produced with Dre Moon and Allen Ritter)
- 09. "Don't Lose Me" (produced with Doughboy)
- 10. "Underrated" (produced with Southside, as SO ICEY BOYZ)
- 13. "On Fleek" (featuring Quavo) (produced with Zaytoven and Doughboy)
- 14. "Quarter Milli" (featuring Gucci Mane) (produced with Pyrex)
- 15. "Red Room"
- 16 "Came a Long Way"

=== James Blake - Assume Form ===
- 02. "Mile High" (featuring Travis Scott and Metro Boomin) (produced with Blake, Dre Moon, Dan Foat and Wavey)
- 03. "Tell Them" (featuring Moses Sumney and Metro Boomin) (produced with Blake, Allen Ritter, Dan Foat and Wavey)

=== Solange - When I Get Home ===
- 06. "Stay Flo" (produced with Solange and John Carroll Kirby)

=== Lil Keed - Long Live Mexico ===
- 10. "Pass It Out" (featuring Lil Gotit)

=== Quality Control - Quality Control: Control the Streets, Volume 2 ===
- 09. "Pink Toes" (with Offset and DaBaby featuring Gunna) (produced with Southside and Cubeatz)
- 11. "100 Racks" (with Offset featuring Playboi Carti) (produced with Pi'erre Bourne)

=== Gucci Mane - Woptober II ===
- 13. "Break Bread" (produced with Doughboy)

== 2020 ==
=== Various Artists - Al Anesa Farah - (Music from the Original TV Series) ===
- 01. "Ya Lil" (performed by Ramage featuring Nicki Minaj) (produced with Ramage, Nicki Minaj, Massari, Wassim Slaiby, Benny Blanco, MAZ, Frank Dukes and Louis Bell)

=== The Weeknd - After Hours ===
- 06. "Escape from LA" (produced with The Weeknd and Illangelo)
- 07. "Heartless" (produced with The Weeknd, Illangelo, and Dre Moon)
- 08. "Faith" (produced with The Weeknd and Illangelo)
- 14. "Until I Bleed Out" (produced with Oneohtrix Point Never, Illangelo, Prince 85, The Weeknd, and Notinbed)

=== Lil Durk - The Voice ===
- 07. "Stay Down" (with 6LACK and Young Thug) (produced with DY Krazy)

=== Young Nudy ===
- 01. "Vice City"

== 2021 ==
=== Various Artists - Dutch (Original Motion Picture Soundtrack) ===
- 03. "Jiggy Lil Be" (performed By Danileigh)

=== Various Artists - Gully (Original Motion Picture Soundtrack) ===
- 01. "Betrayed" (performed By 21 Savage)

=== Drake - Certified Lover Boy ===
- 13. "Knife Talk" (featuring 21 Savage and Project Pat)

=== Don Toliver - Life of a Don ===
- 07. "Swangin’ on Westheimer" (produced with Mario Winans)
- 11. "Company, Pt. 2"

=== Young Thug - Punk ===
- 03. "Stupid/Asking"
- 18. "Love You More" (featuring Nate Ruess, Gunna & Jeff Bhasker)

=== James Blake - Friends That Break Your Heart ===
- 07. "Foot Forward" (produced with James Blake and Frank Dukes)

=== Coldplay - Music of the Spheres ===
- 05. "Let Somebody Go" (featuring Selena Gomez)

=== Lil Gotit - Top Chef Gotit ===
- 14. "Grim Reaper"

=== Juice Wrld - Fighting Demons ===
- 01. "Burn"

=== Gucci Mane - So Icy Christmas ===
- 17. "Long Live Dolph"

== 2022 ==
=== Gunna - DS4Ever ===
- 03. "poochie gown"
- 06. "P power" (featuring Drake)
- 08. "alotta cake"

Kodak Black - Kutthroat Bill: Vol. 1

- 9. "I'm So Awesome"

=== Drake & 21 Savage - Her Loss ===
- 14. "More M's"

== 2023 ==
=== Lil Durk - Almost Healed ===
- 10. "War Bout It" (featuring 21 Savage)
- 12. "Grandson"

=== Young Thug - Business Is Business ===
- 1. "Parade on Cleveland" (featuring Drake)
- 6. "Uncle M"
- 7. "Abracadabra" (featuring Travis Scott)
- 9. "Oh U Went" (featuring Drake)
- 10. "Want Me Dead" (featuring 21 Savage)
- 12. "Mad Dog"
- 13. "Jonesboro"
- 14. "Hoodie" (featuring BSlime & Lil Gotit)
- 15. "Global Access" (featuring Nate Ruess)

=== The Weeknd - The Idol, Vol. 1 (Music from the HBO Original Series) ===
- 00. "Popular" (featuring Madonna & Playboi Carti) (produced with The Weeknd, Mike Dean, and Tommy Rush)

==== Episode 2 ====
- 3. "Double Fantasy" (featuring Future) (produced with The Weeknd and Mike Dean)

==== Episode 3 ====
- 1. "A Lesser Man" (produced with The Weeknd and Mike Dean)
- 2. "Take Me Back" (produced with The Weeknd and Mike Dean)

=== Diddy - The Love Album ===
- 12. "Creepin (Remix)" [featuring 21 Savage & The Weeknd]

=== Travis Scott - Utopia ===
- 19. "Til Further Notice" (featuring James Blake & 21 Savage)

=== Offset - Set It Off ===
- 11. "Night Vision"

=== Kodak Black - When I Was Dead ===
- 1. "Kylie Grande"
- 9. "Came Thru Flushin'"

== 2024 ==
=== 21 Savage - american dream ===
- 6. "Pop Ur Shit" (featuring Young Thug)
- 8. "Dangerous" (featuring Lil Durk)
- 9. "Née-Nah" (featuring Travis Scott)
- 13. "just like me" (featuring Burna Boy)

=== Future & Metro Boomin - We Don't Trust You ===
- 1. "We Don't Trust You"
- 2. "Young Metro" (featuring The Weeknd)
- 3. "Ice Attack"
- 4. "Type Shit" (featuring Travis Scott & Playboi Carti)
- 5. "Claustrophobic"
- 6. "Like That" (featuring Kendrick Lamar)
- 7. "Slimed In"
- 8. "Magic Don Juan (Princess Diana)"
- 9. "Cinderella" (featuring Travis Scott)
- 10. "Runnin Outta Time"
- 11. "Fried (She a Vibe)"
- 12. "Ain't No Love"
- 13. "Everyday Hustle" (featuring Rick Ross)
- 14. "GTA"
- 15. "Seen It All"
- 16. "WTFYM"
- 17. "Where My Twin @"

=== Future & Metro Boomin - We Still Don't Trust You ===
- 1. "We Still Don't Trust You" (featuring The Weeknd)
- 2. "Drink N Dance"
- 3. "Out of My Hands"
- 4. "Jealous"
- 5. "This Sunday"
- 6. "Luv Bad Bitches" (featuring Brownstone)
- 7. "Amazing (Interlude)"
- 8. "All to Myself" (featuring The Weeknd)
- 9. "Nights Like This"
- 10. "Came to the Party"
- 11. "Right 4 You"
- 12. "Mile High Memories"
- 13. "Overload"
- 14. "Gracious" (featuring Ty Dolla $ign)
- 15. "Beat It"
- 16. "Always Be My Fault" (featuring The Weeknd)
- 17. "One Big Family"
- 18. "Red Leather" (featuring J. Cole)

==== Disc 2 ====
- 1. "#1 (Intro)"
- 2. "Nobody Knows My Struggle"
- 3. "All My Life" (featuring Lil Baby)
- 4. "Crossed Out"
- 5. "Crazy Clientele"
- 6. "Show of Hands" (featuring A$AP Rocky)
- 7. "Streets Made Me a King"

=== Young Nudy ===
- "John Wayne"

=== Don Toliver - HARDSTONE PSYCHO ===
- 9. "PURPLE RAIN" (featuring Future)

=== Juice Wrld - The Party Never Ends ===
- 13. "Celebrate" (feat. Offset)

== 2025 ==
=== The Weeknd - Hurry Up Tomorrow ===
- 02. "Cry for Me" (produced with Mike Dean)
- 09. "Reflections Laughing" (produced with Mike Dean, OPN & Salon)
- 11. "Given Up on Me" (produced with Mike Dean, OPN & Salon)

=== Playboi Carti - Music ===
- 07. "RADAR"

=== Travis Scott and JACKBOYS - JACKBOYS 2 ===
- 18. "DA WIZARD" (produced with TM88 & DJ Moon)

=== Offset - Kiari ===
- 01. "Enemies" (produced with London Jae & Da Honorable C.N.O.T.E.)

== 2026 ==
=== Chris Brown - Brown ===
- 01. "Leave Me Alone" (produced with Ken Will & Key Bridgez)
- 27. "Present" (produced with Hunter Sallis)

=== Rick Ross - Set in Stone ===
- 04. "Face Down" (feat. Rich the Kid) (produced with Mike Dean)

== Notes ==
^{^[b]} This music was not included on the official track listing of Black Ken.
