= We Trust You Tour =

2024 concert tour by Future and Metro Boomin

- Tour by Future & Metro Boomin
- Promotional poster
- Location: North America
- Associated albums: We Don't Trust You; We Still Don't Trust You
- Start date: July 30, 2024
- End date: September 9, 2024
- No. of shows: 27
Future tour chronology
Future and Friends: One Big Party Tour (2023)	We Trust You Tour (2024)	...
Metro Boomin tour chronology
We Trust You Tour (2024)	...

The We Trust You Tour (stylized in all caps) was a co-headlining concert tour by American rapper Future and American producer Metro Boomin, in support of their collaborative albums We Don't Trust You and We Still Don't Trust You. Consisting of 27 shows in North America, the tour began on July 30, 2024, in Kansas City, Missouri, and ended on September 9, 2024, in Vancouver, British Columbia.

== Background ==
On March 8, 2024, Future and Metro Boomin revealed plans to release two collaborative studio albums titled We Don't Trust You and We Still Don't Trust You, which were released on March 22 and April 12, 2024, respectively.

In March 2024, Future and Metro Boomin were announced as co-headliners for the Lollapalooza festival in August. On April 16, 2024, the artists would announce the full tour in support of the albums, titled the We Trust You Tour.

== Set list ==
This is the set list for the opening night in Kansas City. It may not reflect the set list of every show.

=== Metro Boomin DJ set ===
1. Kanye West – "Father Stretch My Hands, Pt. 1"
2. Migos featuring Lil Uzi Vert – "Bad and Boujee"
3. 21 Savage & Metro Boomin – "Glock in My Lap"
4. 21 Savage & Metro Boomin – "No Heart"
5. ILoveMakonnen – "Tuesday"
6. Gucci Mane featuring Migos – "I Get the Bag"
7. 21 Savage & Metro Boomin – "Runnin"
8. Drake – "Knife Talk"
9. 21 Savage – "Bank Account"
10. The Weeknd – "Heartless"
11. Metro Boomin & Future featuring Don Toliver – "Too Many Nights"
12. Metro Boomin, The Weeknd & 21 Savage – "Creepin'"
13. Offset & Metro Boomin – "Ric Flair Drip"

=== Future solo set ===
1. "Stick Talk"
2. "712PM"
3. "I'm Dat N****"
4. "New Level"
5. "Fuck Up Some Commas"
6. "Bugatti"
7. "Move That Dope"
8. "Same Damn Time"
9. "Turn Yo Clic Up"
10. "Puffin on Zootiez"
11. "Real Sisters"
12. "Relationship"
13. "Me or Sum"
14. "Drankin n Smokin"
15. "Love Me"
16. "Married to the Game"
17. "My Savages"
18. "Turn On the Lights"
19. "Loveeeeeee Song"
20. "Love You Better"
21. "Wait for U"
22. "March Madness"

=== Future & Metro Boomin joint set ===
1. "Superhero (Heroes & Villains)"
2. "Monster"
3. "Karate Chop"
4. "I Serve the Base"
5. "Thought It Was a Drought"
6. "Where Ya At"
7. "Young Metro"
8. "Slimed In"
9. "GTA"
10. "Wicked"
11. "Freak Hoe"
12. "Honest"
13. "Luv Bad Bitches"
14. "We Still Don't Trust You"
15. "Low Life"
16. "Type Shit"
17. "Fried (She a Vibe)"
18. "Mask Off"
19. "Like That"

== Tour dates ==
List of concerts
Date (2024)	City	Country	Venue	Attendance	Revenue
July 30	Kansas City	United States	T-Mobile Center	—	—
July 31	Saint Paul	United States	Xcel Energy Center	—	—
August 2	Milwaukee	United States	Fiserv Forum	—	—
August 3 (Note: This concert is part of Lollapalooza.)	Chicago	United States	Grant Park	—N/a	—N/a
August 4	Detroit	United States	Little Caesars Arena	—	—
August 6	Nashville	United States	Bridgestone Arena	—	—
August 8	Atlanta	United States	State Farm Arena	13,215 / 13,215	$1,847,293
August 10	Columbus	United States	Value City Arena	—	—
August 11	Toronto	Canada	Scotiabank Arena	13,816 / 14,761	$1,678,930
August 13	Boston	United States	TD Garden	11,313 / 13,874	$1,420,977
August 14	Philadelphia	United States	Wells Fargo Center	—	—
August 15	New York (Note: Labeled as Brooklyn in promotional material.)	United States	Barclays Center	14,672 / 14,672	$1,829,768
August 17	Washington, D.C.	United States	Capital One Arena	—	—
August 20	New Orleans	United States	Smoothie King Center	—	—
August 22	Houston	United States	Toyota Center	—	—
August 23	San Antonio	United States	Frost Bank Center	—	—
August 24	Dallas	United States	American Airlines Center	—	—
August 25	Tulsa	United States	BOK Center	—	—
August 27	Denver	United States	Ball Arena	—	—
August 28	Salt Lake City	United States	Delta Center	—	—
August 30	Paradise (Note: Labeled as Las Vegas in promotional material.)	United States	T-Mobile Arena	12,613 / 15,291	$1,148,379
August 31	Inglewood (Note: Labeled as Los Angeles in promotional material.)	United States	Intuit Dome	—	—
September 3	Sacramento	United States	Golden 1 Center	—	—
September 4	Oakland	United States	Oakland Arena	—	—
September 6	Seattle	United States	Climate Pledge Arena	—	—
September 7	Portland	United States	Moda Center	—	—
September 9	Vancouver	Canada	Rogers Arena	—	—
Total				65,629 / 71,813 (91.39%)	$7,925,347 (5 shows)
