= Push Ups (song) =

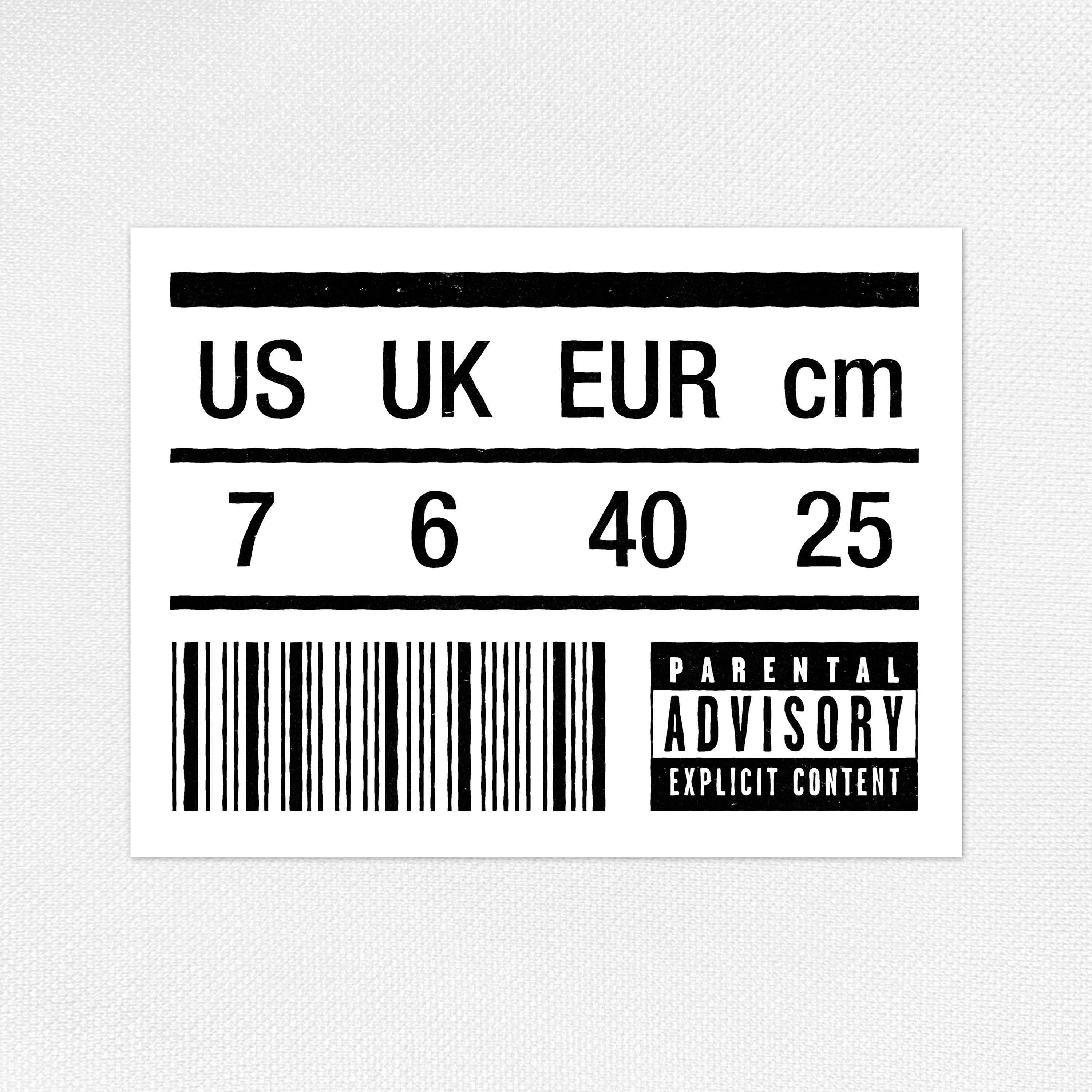

Single by Drake
- Released: April 19, 2024
- Recorded: 2024
- Genre: Hip hop; trap
- Length: 3:52
- Label: OVO; Republic
- Songwriters: Aubrey Graham; Matthew Samuels; Noel Cadastre
- Producers: Boi-1da; Coleman; Fierce; Noel Cadastre; Dramakid; Tay Keith

Drake singles chronology
"Act II: Date @ 8" (remix) (2024)	"Push Ups" (2024)	"Family Matters" (2024)

"Push Ups" is a diss track written and recorded by Canadian rapper Drake. It was released on April 19, 2024, through OVO Sound and Republic Records. The track serves as a response to several songs from Metro Boomin and Future's collaborative albums We Don't Trust You and We Still Don't Trust You (primarily "Like That" with Kendrick Lamar). "Push Ups" targets Metro Boomin, Future, Kendrick Lamar, Rick Ross, the Weeknd, and Ja Morant.

A demo version of "Push Ups" leaked on April 13, 2024, featuring samples from "Get Money" by Junior M.A.F.I.A. and an alternate outro. Due to the low audio technical quality of the initial demo, some fans speculated that the track was a product of artificial intelligence rather than a genuine song. This was debunked once the track officially released on April 19.

Two tracks were released in response to the song, Ross's "Champagne Moments" and Lamar's "Euphoria". "Push Ups" is the second song serving as a response to "Like That", after J. Cole's "7 Minute Drill", which was released on April 5 but was removed from streaming services a week later.

== Background ==
Drake and Kendrick Lamar have had a long history with one another, with Lamar featuring on Drake's 2011 album Take Care on the song "Buried Alive Interlude" and Drake featuring on Lamar's 2012 song "Poetic Justice" from Lamar's album Good Kid, M.A.A.D City. The two have also been featured on ASAP Rocky's 2012 posse cut "Fuckin' Problems". Following these collaborations, Lamar featured on Big Sean's 2013 song "Control", where he called out Drake and other rappers, saying "I got love for you all but I'm trying to murder you niggas." Lamar later attacked artists who used ghostwriters in a 2017 interview, with some considering it to be a reference to Drake's past use of outside writers. The two also dissed one another on several songs during this period, but neither ever mentioned the other by name.

On Drake's 2023 song "First Person Shooter" with J. Cole, Cole said that he, along with Drake, and Lamar made up the "Big Three" of modern rap music. Six months later, Lamar responded to "First Person Shooter" through a surprise appearance on Future and Metro Boomin's single "Like That", from their collaborative album We Don't Trust You (2024), where he dismissed J. Cole's "Big Three" remark and claimed that he alone rules the rap scene. Lamar also makes several references to Drake, calling his "best work" a "light pack" and comparing their rivalry to that of Michael Jackson and Prince, saying "Prince outlived Mike Jack." "Push Ups" was seen by many as a response to "Like That", as well as a culmination of the feud between Lamar and Drake.

Before it was formally released, two versions of the track surfaced online on 13 April 2024, one contained a preview of "Family Matters" through a snippet. Earlier that day, a teaser billboard and digital banner from Spotify hinted at a new release from Drake, believed to be associated with the diss track:

Hip-Hop is a competitive sport.
Drake is on the way.

The song was later officially released on April 19.

== Lyrics ==
In the song, Drake begins with the lines "I could never be nobody number-one fan / Your first number one, I had to put it in your hand", which have been interpreted as a response to Future's lyrics in "We Don't Trust You", notably the verses "Fake written all over you / Hate written all over you" and "You a nigga number one fan, dog / Sneak dissin', I don't understand, dog / Pillowtalkin', actin' like a fed, dog / I don't need another fake friend, dog / Can't be 'bout a ho, 'cause we sharin', dog / In your feelings, nigga, why you payin', dog?" Drake and Future have collaborated extensively since 2011, including on the 2015 mixtape What a Time to Be Alive, as well as US top-15 singles such as "Wait for U", "Life Is Good", "Way 2 Sexy", "Jumpman", and "Used to This". The song "Way 2 Sexy" notably became Future's first number-one hit on the US Billboard Hot 100 chart. Additionally, Drake appears to reference Future's assistant, Just Tokyo, with the line "I'm out in Tokyo because I'm big in Japan", and indirectly mentions Future's ex-fiancée Ciara with "Rolling Loud stage, y'all were turnt, that was slick as hell / Shit'll probably change if your BM start to kiss and tell."

Drake also criticizes Metro Boomin in the song, instructing him to "shut [his] hoe ass up and make some drums, nigga". Moreover, he targets the Weeknd's manager, CashXO, and the Weeknd himself, comparing their relationship to that of a pimp and his trick: "Y'all nigga manager was Chubbs lil' blunt runner / [...] / Cash blowin' Abel bread, out here trickin' / Shit we do for bitches, he doin' for niggas." He also includes a line perceived as addressing the Weeknd and his XO record label: "Hugs and kisses, man, don't tell me 'bout no switches".

The song predominantly features Drake addressing Lamar, asserting "You won't ever take no chain off of us" in response to Lamar's line in "Like That" ("I'm snatchin' chains and burnin' tattoos") and mocking Lamar's stature with "How the fuck you big steppin' with a size-seven men's on?" referring to Lamar's 2022 album Mr. Morale & the Big Steppers. Drake further criticizes Lamar's record deal with Top Dawg Entertainment, suggesting it allows the CEO, Anthony "Top Dawg" Tiffith, to claim 50% of Lamar's career earnings: "Top told you, 'Drop and give me fifty,' like some push-ups". He questions Lamar's musical authenticity with "You better do that motherfuckin' show inside the bity / Maroon 5 need a verse, you better make it witty / Then we need a verse for the Swifties". Jordan Rose of Complex notes these lines highlight a perceived contrast in artistic integrity between Lamar and Drake. He wrote that some criticize Drake for capitulating to mainstream audiences, but Drake uses this line to say that this criticism should also be levied at Lamar.

Drake also responds to the idea of a "Big Three" in rap, implied in "Like That" and "First Person Shooter", by stating artists like SZA, Travis Scott, and 21 Savage surpass Lamar. He also accuses Lamar of jealousy, saying "I'm at the top of the mountain, so you tight now" and elevates himself above Lamar by countering Lamar's comparison of himself to Prince and Drake to Michael Jackson with "What's a prince to a king? He a son, nigga". He also makes a reference to Lamar's wife, Whitney Alford, with "I be with some bodyguards like Whitney" and clarifies that his feud with Lamar extends beyond "Like That": "And that fuckin' song y'all got did not start the beef with us / This shit been brewin' in a pot, now I'm heatin' up / I don't care what Cole think, that Dot shit was weak as fuck".

In addition, Drake addresses Rick Ross in the song, implying a potential romantic interest in Ross's partner and criticizing Ross's age and reliance on collaborations with Drake: "I might take your latest girl and cuff her like I'm Ricky / Can't believe he jumpin' in, this nigga turnin' fifty / Every song that made it on the chart, he got from Drizzy / Spend that lil' check you got and stay up out my business". He also mentions professional basketball player Ja Morant, alluding to a personal grievance: "Shout out to the hooper that be bustin' out the griddy / We know why you mad, nigga, I ain't even trippin' / All that lil' heartbroken Twitter shit for bitches".

== Aftermath ==
Rick Ross responded to the track with "Champagne Moments", which premiered in snippets on April 13, the same day "Push Ups" was leaked. It was later officially released on April 15. The song alleges Drake uses ghostwriters; that he sent a cease-and-desist to block a collaboration with French Montana; that Drake purposefully leaked "Push Ups"; and that he had plastic surgeries.

Kendrick Lamar responded to the track with "Euphoria", released April 30, 2024. Metro Boomin responded with the diss track beat "BBL Drizzy" on May 5, 2024. ASAP Rocky responded with the song "Ruby Rosary" featuring J. Cole, released on September 6, 2024.

== Charts ==
=== Weekly charts ===
Weekly chart performance for "Push Ups"
Chart (2024)	Peak position
Australia (ARIA)	37
Australia Hip Hop/R&B (ARIA)	3
Austria (Ö3 Austria Top 40)	53
Canada Hot 100 (Billboard)	10
Denmark (Tracklisten)	36
Germany (GfK)	70
Global 200 (Billboard)	20
Greece International (IFPI)	5
Iceland (Tónlistinn)	13
Ireland (IRMA)	20
Lebanon English (Lebanese Top 20)	17
Lithuania (AGATA)	49
Netherlands (Single Top 100)	67
New Zealand (Recorded Music NZ)	34
Portugal (AFP)	52
Slovakia Singles Digital (ČNS IFPI)	80
South Africa Streaming (TOSAC)	6
Sweden (Sverigetopplistan)	54
Switzerland (Schweizer Hitparade)	25
UAE (IFPI)	6
UK Singles (Official Charts)	14
UK Hip Hop/R&B (Official Charts)	1
US Billboard Hot 100	17
US Hot R&B/Hip-Hop Songs (Billboard)	2
US Rhythmic Airplay (Billboard)	25

=== Year-end charts ===
2024 year-end chart performance for "Push Ups"
Chart (2024)	Position
US Hot R&B/Hip-Hop Songs (Billboard)	55

== Certifications ==
Certifications for "Push Ups"
Region	Certification	Certified units/sales
Brazil (Pro-Música Brasil)	Gold	20,000^{‡}
^{‡} Sales+streaming figures based on certification alone.
