= Cinderella (Future, Metro Boomin and Travis Scott song) =

Song by Future, Metro Boomin and Travis Scott

from the album We Don't Trust You
- Released: March 22, 2024
- Genre: Trap
- Length: 2:50
- Label: Wilburn Holding; Boominati; Epic; Republic
- Songwriters: Nayvadius Wilburn; Leland Wayne; Jacques Webster II
- Producers: Metro Boomin; Allen Ritter; Dre Moon

"Cinderella" is a song written and performed by American rapper Future and American record producer Metro Boomin with fellow American rapper and singer Travis Scott. It was released through Freebandz (under the business name Wilburn Holding Co), Boominati Worldwide, Epic Records, and Republic as the ninth track from the former two's collaborative studio album, We Don't Trust You, on March 22, 2024. Metro produced the track alongside Allen Ritter and Dre Moon.

== Background ==
Snippets of the song (also referred to as "Family Forever") were leaked to various platforms such as X and YouTube in late 2023, with unfinished portions completed using artificial intelligence. The song was initially believed to be an outtake from Travis Scott's Utopia. One unofficial uploading of the song (titled "Utopia Cinderella"), has amassed almost 3 million plays on Spotify, while another version of the song on YouTube has amassed over one million views.

On March 18, 2024, Future and Metro headlined the Rolling Loud music festival in California where they, alongside Scott, performed the song.

== Critical reception ==
Michael Saponara of Billboard ranked "Cinderella" as the sixth best song on We Don't Trust You. Saponara remarked that "La Flame gets the best of Pluto in this round, with a woozy assist." He also wrote, "It’s always great when a snippet lives up to the hype."

== Charts ==
=== Weekly charts ===
Weekly chart performance for "Cinderella"
Chart (2024)	Peak position
Australia (ARIA)	40
Australia Hip Hop/R&B (ARIA)	9
Austria (Ö3 Austria Top 40)	25
Canada Hot 100 (Billboard)	11
Czech Republic Singles Digital (ČNS IFPI)	44
Global 200 (Billboard)	8
Greece International (IFPI)	3
Iceland (Tónlistinn)	16
Ireland (IRMA)	29
Italy (FIMI)	98
Latvia (LAIPA)	11
Lithuania (AGATA)	20
Luxembourg (Billboard)	13
MENA (IFPI)	7
Netherlands (Single Top 100)	66
New Zealand (Recorded Music NZ)	28
Norway (VG-lista)	40
Poland (Polish Streaming Top 100)	54
Portugal (AFP)	30
Romania (Billboard)	25
Saudi Arabia (IFPI)	9
Slovakia Singles Digital (ČNS IFPI)	18
South Africa Streaming (TOSAC)	8
Sweden Heatseeker (Sverigetopplistan)	5
Switzerland (Schweizer Hitparade)	9
UAE (IFPI)	7
UK Singles (OCC)	20
UK Hip Hop/R&B (OCC)	6
US Billboard Hot 100	6
US Hot R&B/Hip-Hop Songs (Billboard)	3

=== Year-end charts ===
2024 year-end chart performance for "Cinderella"
Chart (2024)	Position
US Hot R&B/Hip-Hop Songs (Billboard)	41

== Certifications ==
Certifications for "Cinderella"
Region	Certification	Certified units/sales
Canada (Music Canada)	Platinum	80,000^{‡}
^{‡} Sales+streaming figures based on certification alone.
