= Giving Chanel =

2024 single by Meek Mill featuring Future

Single by Meek Mill featuring Future

from the EP Heathenism
- Released: February 29, 2024
- Length: 3:27
- Label: Dream Chasers
- Songwriters: Robert Williams; Nayvadius Cash; Nikolas Papamitrou; Ari Nijam; Nii Noi Tetteh; Sarthak Bharadwaj
- Producers: Nick Papz; Ari Beats; KJ; Sarthak

Meek Mill singles chronology
"Same 24" (2024)	"Giving Chanel" (2024)

Future singles chronology
"Arabi" (2024)	"Giving Chanel" (2024)	"Type Shit" (2024)

"Giving Chanel" is a song by American rapper Meek Mill, released on February 29, 2024, from his EP Heathenism as the lead single. It features American rapper Future and was produced by Nick Papz, Ari Beats, KJ and 4Sarthak.

== Critical reception ==
Zachary Horvath of HotNewHipHop commented that "Future absolutely dominates 'Giving Chanel.' His verse takes up the bulk of the runtime. However, he manages to be entertaining throughout his performance. Hendrix's fast-paced flow is stank-face inducing and he adds some cool cadences as well. For example, when he rhymes words with long "e" sounds he really draws out the vowel sound."

== Charts ==
Chart performance for "Giving Chanel"
Chart (2024)	Peak position
US Bubbling Under Hot 100 (Billboard)	11
US Hot R&B/Hip-Hop Songs (Billboard)	42
