= We Don't Trust You (song) =

Song by Future and Metro Boomin

from the album We Don't Trust You
- Released: March 22, 2024
- Genre: Trap
- Length: 3:46
- Label: Wilburn Holding; Boominati; Epic; Republic
- Songwriters: Nayvadius Wilburn; Leland Wayne; Mejdi Rhars
- Producers: Metro Boomin; Prince 85

"We Don't Trust You" is a song by American rapper Future and American record producer Metro Boomin. It was released through Freebandz (under the business name Wilburn Holding Co), Boominati Worldwide, Epic Records, and Republic as the opening track from their collaborative studio album of the same name on March 22, 2024. Produced by Metro and Prince85 and additionally produced by D. Rich, the three wrote the song with Future, while Chris Xz also additionally produced it even though he did not help write it.

== Critical reception ==
Angel Diaz of Billboard ranked "We Don't Trust You" as the best song on its titular album. Diaz thought that Future was taking shots at his previous collaborator, Drake who was feuding with Metro Boomin.

Writing for Clash, Robin Murray stated that the song "opens the record on a note of paranoia, the chirruping snare trills emanating menacingly in the background". HipHopDX's Scott Glasher described the song as "a slow burning trap by numbers heater".

== Charts ==
=== Weekly charts ===
Weekly chart performance for "We Don't Trust You"
Chart (2024)	Peak position
Australia (ARIA)	56
Australia Hip Hop/R&B (ARIA)	14
Canada Hot 100 (Billboard)	15
Global 200 (Billboard)	11
France (SNEP)	89
Iceland (Tónlistinn)	18
Lithuania (AGATA)	40
Luxembourg (Billboard)	19
MENA (IFPI)	10
New Zealand Hot Singles (RMNZ)	8
Nigeria (TurnTable Top 100)	77
Portugal (AFP)	49
Saudi Arabia (IFPI)	20
Slovakia Singles Digital (ČNS IFPI)	44
South Africa Streaming (TOSAC)	7
Sweden Heatseeker (Sverigetopplistan)	10
UAE (IFPI)	16
UK Streaming (OCC)	42
US Billboard Hot 100	8
US Hot R&B/Hip-Hop Songs (Billboard)	5

=== Year-end charts ===
2024 year-end chart performance for "We Don't Trust You"
Chart (2024)	Position
US Hot R&B/Hip-Hop Songs (Billboard)	79
