= Young Metro =

Single by Future, Metro Boomin and the Weeknd

from the album We Don't Trust You
- Released: March 25, 2024
- Genre: Hip hop; trap; R&B
- Length: 3:25
- Label: Wilburn Holding; Boominati; Epic; Republic
- Songwriters: Nayvadius Wilburn; Leland Wayne; Abel Tesfaye; Eren Yüksel
- Producers: Metro Boomin; Mike Dean; David x Eli

Future singles chronology
"Type Shit" (2024)	"Young Metro" (2024)	"Like That" (2024)

Metro Boomin singles chronology
"Type Shit" (2024)	"Young Metro" (2024)	"Like That" (2024)

The Weeknd singles chronology
"One of the Girls" (2023)	"Young Metro" (2024)	"We Still Don't Trust You" (2024)

Music video
- "Young Metro" on YouTube

"Young Metro" is a song by American rapper Future, American record producer Metro Boomin, and Canadian singer the Weeknd. It was released through Freebandz (under the business name Wilburn Holding Co), Boominati Worldwide, Epic Records, and Republic as the second single from Future and Metro's collaborative studio album, We Don't Trust You, on March 25, 2024. Its official music video was released on the same day. The three artists wrote the song together and it was produced by Metro himself, Mike Dean, and David x Eli.

== Critical reception ==
Michael Saponara of Billboard ranked "Young Metro" as the seventh best song on We Don't Trust You. Saponara wrote that Metro Boomin's dark production helps Future "indulge in his dark side and lean into his Evel Knievel impression". He notes that the Weeknd "[uses] his angelic vocals as an instrument adding to the cinematic backdrop, rather than delivering a more traditional collab like their pop-friendly hit 'Low Life'".

Writing for Clash, Robin Murray stated that the song is a "sub-zero tone" of "a note of paranoia, the chirruping snare trills emanating menacingly in the background". HipHopDX's Scott Glasher noted that the song contains "face-melting synths and rapid-fire hi-hats give Future and Abel [Tesfaye] space to get off some bars and subsequent croons".

== Charts ==
=== Weekly charts ===
Weekly chart performance for "Young Metro"
Chart (2024)	Peak position
Australia (ARIA)	68
Australia Hip Hop/R&B (ARIA)	17
Canada Hot 100 (Billboard)	17
France (SNEP)	111
Global 200 (Billboard)	15
Greece (IFPI)	10
Iceland (Tónlistinn)	26
Lithuania (AGATA)	53
MENA (IFPI)	8
Nigeria (TurnTable Top 100)	96
Portugal (AFP)	60
Saudi Arabia (IFPI)	17
Slovakia Singles Digital (ČNS IFPI)	40
South Africa (TOSAC)	13
Sweden Heatseeker (Sverigetopplistan)	13
UAE (IFPI)	14
UK Streaming (OCC)	47
US Billboard Hot 100	9
US Hot R&B/Hip-Hop Songs (Billboard)	6

=== Year-end charts ===
2024 year-end chart performance for "Young Metro"
Chart (2024)	Position
US Hot R&B/Hip-Hop Songs (Billboard)	74

== Certifications ==
Certifications for "Young Metro"
Region	Certification	Certified units/sales
Canada (Music Canada)	Gold	40,000^{‡}
^{‡} Sales+streaming figures based on certification alone.
