= Superhero (Heroes & Villains) =

2022 song by Metro Boomin, Future and Chris Brown

Song by Metro Boomin, Future and Chris Brown

from the album Heroes & Villains
- Released: December 2, 2022
- Genre: Trap
- Length: 3:02
- Label: Boominati; Republic
- Songwriters: Leland Wayne; Nayvadius Wilburn; Christopher Brown; Kanye West; Shawn Carter; Terrence Thornton; Cydell Young; Kasseem Dean; Robert Diggs; Ernest Wilson; Michael Dean; Manfred Lubowitz; Allen Ritter; David Ruoff; Elias Klughammer
- Producers: Metro Boomin; Ritter (co.); David x Eli (co.)

Music video
- "Superhero (Heroes & Villains)" on YouTube

"Superhero (Heroes & Villains)" is a song by American record producer Metro Boomin, American rapper Future, and American singer Chris Brown, released as the title track from the former's second studio album Heroes & Villains (2022). Co-produced by Allen Ritter and David X Eli, it peaked at number 8 on the Billboard Hot 100.

== Composition ==
"Superhero (Heroes & Villains)" is a trap song that features "pummeling 808s and muted horns" in the production, over which Future raps in his "customary, chant-like flow", and style similar to "the days of DS2" In the latter portion, the instrumental "fades into somber synths", for "distorted melodies" from Chris Brown, who sings about people who do not want to see him succeed. The song also contains a sample of rapper Jay-Z's line about living "long enough to see yourself become a villain" in "So Appalled" by Kanye West (which is a reference to Harvey Dent's quote in the film The Dark Knight).

== Critical reception ==
The song received generally positive reviews from critics. Hamza Riaz of Mic Cheque deemed it as one of the "bone-chilling cuts" and best tracks from Heroes & Villains, although also writing that "When there is a new voice, they are shoehorned onto a disconnected strand of a track that would've benefited without it", bringing up the song as an example. Peter A. Berry of Complex praised Future's vocals, describing them as "mix of menace, rambunctiousness and comically straightforward obscenity", as well as the transition in production, describing it "as theatrical as it is smooth." Brady Brickner-Wood of Pitchfork wrote, “Even Future's got a little pep in his step here, particularly on the anthemic 'Superheroes (Heroes & Villains)'”. HipHopDX defined it "another hit that traces back to 808s wizardry, it transitions from protracted horns to whimsically processed synthesizer notes toward the end as Chris Brown steps in for a brief yet memorable outro".

== Music video ==
A music video for the song was released on December 2, 2022, alongside Heroes & Villains. It begins with Metro Boomin and Future involved in a tense diamond theft, before shifting to a series of surreal scenes, including Metro surfing in the sky. Chris Brown and his respective verse at the end of the song do not appear in the video.

== Charts ==
=== Weekly charts ===
Weekly chart performance for "Superhero (Heroes & Villains)"
Chart (2022–2023)	Peak position
Australia (ARIA)	30
Austria (Ö3 Austria Top 40)	71
Canada Hot 100 (Billboard)	7
France (SNEP)	94
Germany (GfK)	75
Global 200 (Billboard)	8
Greece (IFPI)	3
Iceland (Tónlistinn)	11
Ireland (IRMA)	22
Latvia (LAIPA)	17
Lithuania (AGATA)	29
Luxembourg (Billboard)	18
MENA (IFPI)	11
Netherlands (Single Top 100)	69
New Zealand (Recorded Music NZ)	29
Nigeria (TurnTable Top 100)	50
Portugal (AFP)	21
Romania (Billboard)	18
Sweden Heatseeker (Sverigetopplistan)	6
Switzerland (Schweizer Hitparade)	23
UK Singles (Official Charts)	34
UK Hip Hop/R&B (Official Charts)	8
US Billboard Hot 100	8
US Hot R&B/Hip-Hop Songs (Billboard)	2
US R&B/Hip-Hop Airplay (Billboard)	25
US Rhythmic Airplay (Billboard)	7

=== Year-end charts ===
2023 year-end chart performance for "Superhero (Heroes & Villains)"
Chart (2023)	Position
Canada (Canadian Hot 100)	42
Global 200 (Billboard)	80
US Billboard Hot 100	38
US Hot R&B/Hip-Hop Songs (Billboard)	14
US Rhythmic (Billboard)	29

== Certifications ==
Certifications for "Superhero (Heroes & Villains)"
Region	Certification	Certified units/sales
Australia (ARIA)	3× Platinum	210,000^{‡}
Brazil (Pro-Música Brasil)	2× Platinum	80,000^{‡}
Canada (Music Canada)	2× Platinum	160,000^{‡}
Denmark (IFPI Danmark)	Gold	45,000^{‡}
France (SNEP)	Gold	100,000^{‡}
Italy (FIMI)	Gold	50,000^{‡}
New Zealand (RMNZ)	Platinum	30,000^{‡}
Poland (ZPAV)	Platinum	50,000^{‡}
Portugal (AFP)	Gold	5,000^{‡}
Spain (Promusicae)	Gold	30,000^{‡}
United Kingdom (BPI)	Gold	400,000^{‡}
United States (RIAA)	4× Platinum	4,000,000^{‡}
Streaming
Greece (IFPI Greece)	Platinum	2,000,000^{†}
^{‡} Sales+streaming figures based on certification alone.^{†} Streaming-only figures based on certification alone.
