= Type Shit =

Single by Future, Metro Boomin, Travis Scott, and Playboi Carti

from the album We Don't Trust You
- Released: March 22, 2024
- Recorded: 2023
- Genre: Hip hop; trap
- Length: 3:48
- Label: Wilburn Holding; Boominati; Epic; Republic
- Songwriters: Nayvadius Wilburn; Leland Wayne; Jacques Webster II; Jordan Carter; Dwayne Richardson
- Producers: D. Rich; Mike Dean; Metro Boomin

Future singles chronology
| "Giving Chanel" (2024) | "Type Shit" (2024) | "Young Metro" (2024) |

Metro Boomin singles chronology
| "Née-Nah" (2024) | "Type Shit" (2024) | "Young Metro" (2024) |

Travis Scott singles chronology
| "Fein" (2024) | "Type Shit" (2024) | "FTCU" (SleezeMix) (2024) |

Playboi Carti singles chronology
| "Fein" (2024) | "Type Shit" (2024) | "I Luv It" (2024) |

Music video
- "Type Shit" on YouTube

"Type Shit" is a song by American rapper Future, American record producer Metro Boomin, and fellow American rappers Travis Scott and Playboi Carti. It was sent to Italian radio airplay through Freebandz (under the business name Wilburn Holding Co), Boominati Worldwide, Epic Records and Republic as the lead single from Future and Metro's collaborative studio album, We Don't Trust You, on March 22, 2024, along with the album. Produced by Metro himself, the four artists wrote the song alongside additional producer D. Rich.

== Background ==
The song was first teased after Metro Boomin had taken to his Twitter to share an image of him mixing the track on January 3, 2024. On March 13, Carti would later post a snippet of the song to his Instagram story, tagging Future, Metro, and Scott. Soon after, Metro confirmed this after Tweeting the song's name with the album's hashtag. Later that week, on March 18, Future and Metro headlined at the Rolling Loud music festival in California where they, alongside Scott and Carti, performed the song in its entirety.

Upon the release of the song, its official music video was released.

== Critical reception ==
Michael Saponara of Billboard ranked "Type Shit" as the fourth best song on We Don't Trust You. Saponara wrote that despite Future setting the tone on the track, Scott "invades the scene and makes it his own blockbuster". He notes that Scott "awakens all five senses", crediting his "smokey" vocals for the shift in the track's aesthetic.

Writing for Clash, Robin Murray stated that the song is "awkward" and described it as "less a song and more a chant over a beat". HipHopDX's Glasher wrote that the song is a "true assembly of modern rap’s Avengers". Glasher wrote that Scott and Carti's "dystopian distorted vocals" on the "harrowing beat" can be described as "Medieval church bells drenched with thundering 808s".

== Charts ==
=== Weekly charts ===
Weekly chart performance for "Type Shit"
| Chart (2024) | Peak position |
|---|---|
| Australia (ARIA) | 29 |
| Australia Hip Hop/R&B (ARIA) | 5 |
| Austria (Ö3 Austria Top 40) | 23 |
| Canada Hot 100 (Billboard) | 8 |
| Czech Republic Singles Digital (ČNS IFPI) | 31 |
| France (SNEP) | 91 |
| Germany (GfK) | 33 |
| Global 200 (Billboard) | 6 |
| Greece International (IFPI) | 4 |
| Hungary (Single Top 40) | 40 |
| Iceland (Tónlistinn) | 11 |
| Ireland (IRMA) | 26 |
| Latvia (LAIPA) | 4 |
| Lithuania (AGATA) | 15 |
| Luxembourg (Billboard) | 12 |
| MENA (IFPI) | 6 |
| Netherlands (Single Top 100) | 54 |
| New Zealand (Recorded Music NZ) | 23 |
| Nigeria (TurnTable Top 100) | 91 |
| North Africa (IFPI) | 18 |
| Poland (Polish Streaming Top 100) | 28 |
| Portugal (AFP) | 23 |
| Romania (Billboard) | 8 |
| Saudi Arabia (IFPI) | 10 |
| Slovakia Singles Digital (ČNS IFPI) | 14 |
| South Africa Streaming (TOSAC) | 6 |
| Switzerland (Schweizer Hitparade) | 11 |
| UAE (IFPI) | 5 |
| UK Singles (Official Charts) | 18 |
| UK Hip Hop/R&B (Official Charts) | 5 |
| US Billboard Hot 100 | 2 |
| US Hot R&B/Hip-Hop Songs (Billboard) | 2 |

=== Year-end charts ===
Year-end chart performance for "Type Shit"
| Chart (2024) | Position |
|---|---|
| Australia Hip Hop/R&B (ARIA) | 50 |
| Canada (Canadian Hot 100) | 62 |
| Global 200 (Billboard) | 118 |
| Iceland (Tónlistinn) | 56 |
| US Billboard Hot 100 | 51 |
| US Hot R&B/Hip-Hop Songs (Billboard) | 15 |

== Certifications ==
Certifications for "Type Shit"
| Region | Certification | Certified units/sales |
|---|---|---|
| Australia (ARIA) | Gold | 35,000^{‡} |
| Austria (IFPI Austria) | Platinum | 30,000^{‡} |
| Belgium (BRMA) | Gold | 20,000^{‡} |
| Canada (Music Canada) | 2× Platinum | 160,000^{‡} |
| France (SNEP) | Gold | 100,000^{‡} |
| New Zealand (RMNZ) | Platinum | 30,000^{‡} |
| Poland (ZPAV) | Platinum | 50,000^{‡} |
| Switzerland (IFPI Switzerland) | Gold | 15,000^{‡} |
| United Kingdom (BPI) | Gold | 400,000^{‡} |
Streaming
| Greece (IFPI Greece) | Platinum | 2,000,000^{†} |
^{‡} Sales+streaming figures based on certification alone.^{†} Streaming-only figures based on certification alone.
