= We Don't Trust You =

Studio album by Future and Metro Boomin
- Released: March 22, 2024
- Recorded: 2023–2024
- Genre: Trap
- Length: 59:39
- Labels: Freebandz; Boominati; Epic; Republic
- Producers: Metro Boomin; Boi-1da; David x Eli; Mike Dean; Doughboy; Deputy; G Koop; Honorable C.N.O.T.E.; Peter Lee Johnson; Lil 88; Dre Moon; Outta Town; Oz; Prince85; Allen Ritter; Southside; Wheezy; Will-a-Fool; Zaytoven

Future chronology
I Never Liked You (2022)	We Don't Trust You (2024)	We Still Don't Trust You (2024)

Metro Boomin chronology
Metro Boomin Presents Spider-Man: Across the Spider-Verse (Soundtrack from and Inspired by the Motion Picture) (2023)	We Don't Trust You (2024)	We Still Don't Trust You (2024)

Singles from We Don't Trust You
- 1. "Type Shit" Released: March 22, 2024; 2. "Young Metro" Released: March 25, 2024; 3. "Like That" Released: March 26, 2024

We Don't Trust You is the first collaborative studio album by American rapper Future and American record producer Metro Boomin, released on March 22, 2024, by Freebandz, Epic Records, Boominati Worldwide, and Republic. The album features guest appearances from the Weeknd, Travis Scott, Playboi Carti, Kendrick Lamar, and Rick Ross. Production was primarily handled by Metro himself, alongside Mike Dean, Oz, Southside, Boi-1da, Honorable C.N.O.T.E., Allen Ritter, Dre Moon, Zaytoven, Doughboy, Lil 88, Wheezy, G Koop, and others.

We Don't Trust You was supported by three singles: "Type Shit", "Young Metro", and "Like That". The latter debuted and peaked atop the US Billboard Hot 100, giving Future his third number-one single and Metro his first as a credited artist. The album received generally positive reviews from critics and was a commercial success, debuting atop the US Billboard 200 with the biggest opening week of 2024 at the time of its release. It was nominated for Best Rap Album at the 67th Annual Grammy Awards, with "Like That" being nominated at the Best Rap Performance and Best Rap Song categories.

== Background and promotion ==
In January 2023, Metro was interviewed by radio personality Ebro Darden for the latter's Rap Life Radio radio show, in which he was asked why he did not produce any songs on Future's ninth studio album, I Never Liked You (2022), to which he explained that he wanted to save some songs that he produced for Future for a collaborative album. In March 2023, Metro was interviewed by Flaunt Magazine, in which he promised that a collaborative album between him and Future would be released that same year, which did not end up happening for unknown reasons. In August 2023, Metro shared via Twitter that he had lost three instrumentals meant for the album due to a power outage. In January 2024, he tweeted that he would not cut or shave any of his hair until the album was completed and turned in. On March 8, 2024, he and Future posted a trailer, which also featured a soundbite from the late American rapper Prodigy, in which they revealed the title We Don't Trust You and two release dates of March 22 and April 12. On the same day, journalist Elliott Wilson confirmed that the title was the name of a collaborative album between the two artists and would be released on March 22 and also confirmed that a sequel collaborative album, which was later confirmed to be titled We Still Don't Trust You, would be released on April 12.

In 2024, Future and Metro embarked on the We Trust You Tour in support of We Don't Trust You and its sequel.

=== Singles ===
The lead single of the album, "Type Shit", a collaboration with fellow American rappers Travis Scott and Playboi Carti, was sent to Italian radio airplay on March 22, 2024, alongside the release of the album with the official music video. "Young Metro", a collaboration with Canadian singer the Weeknd, was released as the second single three days later along with the official music video. The third and final single, "Like That", a collaboration with fellow American rapper Kendrick Lamar, was sent to US rhythmic radio the following day; the song debuted and peaked atop the US Billboard Hot 100, giving Future his third number-one single and Metro his first ever.

== Critical reception ==
Professional ratings
Aggregate scores
Source	Rating
Metacritic	64/100
Review scores
Source	Rating
AllMusic	3/5 stars
Clash	6/10
HipHopDX	3.4/5
Pitchfork	7.0/10
Slant Magazine	2/5 stars
HotNewHipHop	"HOTTTTT"

We Don't Trust You currently has a score of 64 out of 100 on review aggregator Metacritic based on seven critics' reviews, indicating "generally positive" reception.

Writing for Clash, Robin Murray noted that the album "never moves in a straight line" and that it "epitomises just why Future and Metro Boomin work together so seamlessly". Concluding his review, Murray wrote that "at times uneven, the project stands as testament to the unique bond between these two A-list rap talents". Jesse Fuller, an independent musical critic, has praised the album for its dark production, Future's effortless flow on the beats, and its lyrical wizardry. HipHopDX's Scott Glaysher describes the album as a "modern rap gospel" and that the project "carries a different tone" from their past collaborations. However, Glaysher states that the album doesn't "live up to its full potential" due to the loss of interest in its final third. Concluding the review, he stated that the album "should have been shorter" despite the duo "consistently [delivering] high-quality tracks". Writing for Slant Magazine, Charles Lyons-Bart gave the album a poor review. He criticizes Future's performance, noting that "Metro’s work is sometimes enough to carry a track" and that his delivery is often "clipped". Concluding his review, he writes that the album presents the downfall of Future, noting that he's "faded and almost lifeless" throughout the project.

Rolling Stone's Mosi Reeves wrote that Metro Boomin "has embraced maximalist, cinematic gestures". All in all, the album is described as "solid but nothing special". Writing for Variety, A.D. Amorosi writes that the album "doesn’t feel like a competition" despite "their signature strengths" being present on the album. Concluding his review, Amorosi notes that "Metro makes more of the duo’s first volume than Future does". HotNewHipHop's Gabrial Bras Nevares rated the album as "HOTTTTT", writing that the project "champions above all else". He notes that despite the album not being a "perfect attempt", it displays "focus, new approaches, intent-driven artistry" and several "bangers". Concluding his review, he noted that the project could have been better, however, the sequel "will not fall victim to complacency".

Critics' year-end rankings of We Don't Trust You
Publication	List	Rank	Ref.
Exclaim!	50 Best Albums of 2024	40	

== Commercial performance ==
In the United States, We Don't Trust You debuted at number one on the Billboard 200 with 251,000 album-equivalent units, which included 324.31 million on-demand streams and 4,500 pure album sales. It marked Future's ninth and Metro Boomin's fourth number-one album in the country, while also scoring the biggest opening week of 2024 so far by both album-equivalent units and on-demand streams.

== Track listing ==
We Don't Trust You track listing
No.	Title	Writer(s)	Producer(s)	Length
1.	"We Don't Trust You"	Nayvadius Wilburn; Leland Wayne; Mejdi Rhars; Dwayne Richardson; Christopher Townsend; Norman Whitfield; Barrett Strong; Paul Fishman	Metro Boomin; Prince85; D. Rich^{[a]}; Chris Xz^{[a]}	3:46
2.	"Young Metro" (with the Weeknd)	Wilburn; Wayne; Abel Tesfaye; Eren Yüksel	Metro Boomin; Mike Dean; David x Eli	3:25
3.	"Ice Attack"	Wilburn; Wayne; Nik Frascona; Paul Beauregard; Jordan Houston; Ricky Dunigan; Darnell Carlton	Metro Boomin; Southside; Oz	3:19
4.	"Type Shit" (with Travis Scott and Playboi Carti)	Wilburn; Wayne; Jacques Webster II; Jordan Carter; D. Richardson	Metro Boomin; Dean; D. Rich^{[a]}	3:48
5.	"Claustrophobic"	Wilburn; Wayne	Metro Boomin; Will-a-Fool	3:42
6.	"Like That" (with Kendrick Lamar)	Wilburn; Wayne; Kendrick Duckworth; Kobe Hood; Rodney Oliver; Joe Cooley	Metro Boomin	4:27
7.	"Slimed In"	Wilburn; Wayne; Jeffery Williams; Rhars	Metro Boomin; Prince85	3:14
8.	"Magic Don Juan (Princess Diana)"	Wilburn; Wayne; Robert Richardson; Shantae Allen	Metro Boomin; Southside; Boi-1da; Honorable C.N.O.T.E.; Deputy	3:40
9.	"Cinderella" (with Travis Scott)	Wilburn; Wayne; Webster; Ethan Stevens; Allen Ritter; Andre Proctor	Metro Boomin; Ritter; Dre Moon	2:49
10.	"Runnin Outta Time"	Wilburn; Wayne; Jordan Holt-May; R. Richardson; Townsend	Metro Boomin; Zaytoven; Chris Xz^{[a]}	3:25
11.	"Fried (She a Vibe)"	Wilburn; Wayne	Metro Boomin; Doughboy	3:30
12.	"Ain't No Love"	Wilburn; Wayne	Metro Boomin; Zaytoven; Lil 88; Outta Town	3:02
13.	"Everyday Hustle" (with Rick Ross)	Wilburn; Wayne; William Roberts II; Alfreda Brockington	Metro Boomin	3:46
14.	"GTA"	Wilburn; Wayne	Metro Boomin; Southside; Wheezy	3:53
15.	"Seen It All"	Wilburn; Wayne; Ritter; Peter Lee Johnson; Albert Johnson; Kejuan Muchita; Melvin Glover; Sylvia Robinson	Metro Boomin; Ritter; P. Johnson	2:59
16.	"WTFYM"	Wilburn; Wayne	Metro Boomin	4:52
17.	"Where My Twin @" (Bonus)	Wilburn; Wayne	Metro Boomin; G Koop	2:02
Total length:				59:39

Notes

- ^{^[a]} signifies an additional producer.
- "Slimed In" features additional vocals from Young Thug
- "Magic Don Juan (Princess Diana)" features additional vocals from Shantae Allen
- "WTFYM" features additional vocals from Travis Scott

=== Samples ===
- "We Don't Trust You" contains a sample of "Smiling Faces Sometimes", written by Norman Whitfield and Barrett Strong, and performed by the Undisputed Truth, and dialogue spoken by Tupac Shakur from the 1996 film Bullet.
- "Ice Attack" contains a sample of "Yeah, I Rob", written by Paul Beauregard, Darnell Carlton, Jordan Houston and Chastity Daniels, and performed by La Chat.
- "Like That" contains samples of "Everlasting Bass", written by Rodney Oliver, and performed by Rodney-O & Joe Cooley and "Eazy-Duz-It", written by Lorenzo Patterson and Andre Young, and performed by Eazy-E.
- "Slimed In" contains a sample of "Mad Dog", written by Jeffery Williams and Leland Wayne and performed by Young Thug.
- "Fried (She a Vibe)" contains an interpolation of "How It Was", written by Nayvadius Wilburn and Leland Wayne, and performed by Future.
- "Everyday Hustle" contains a sample of "I'll Wait For You", written and performed by Alfreda Brockington.
- "Seen It All" contains an interpolation of "Quiet Storm", written by Albert Johnson, Kejuan Muchita, Melvin Glover, and Sylvia Robinson, and performed by Mobb Deep.

== Personnel ==
- Future – vocals
- Metro Boomin – mixing
- Ethan Stevens – mixing (all tracks), engineering (tracks 3–4, 6, 9–10, 16)
- Joe LaPorta – mastering
- Eric Manco – engineering (tracks 1–8, 10–15, 17)
- Shin Kamiyama – engineering (track 2)
- Florian "Flo" Ongonga – engineering (track 3)
- Marcus Fitz – engineering (track 4)
- Kourosh Poursalehi – engineering (tracks 6, 11)
- Ray Charles Brown Jr. – engineering (track 6)
- Victor Luevanos – engineering assistance
- Aaron Fugeri – engineering assistance
- Chris XZ – guitar (track 10)

== Charts ==
=== Weekly charts ===
Weekly chart performance for We Don't Trust You
Chart (2024–2026)	Peak position
Australian Albums (ARIA)	2
Australian Hip Hop/R&B Albums (ARIA)	1
Austrian Albums (Ö3 Austria)	2
Belgian Albums (Ultratop Flanders)	3
Belgian Albums (Ultratop Wallonia)	3
Canadian Albums (Billboard)	1
Czech Albums (ČNS IFPI)	1
Danish Albums (Hitlisten)	3
Dutch Albums (Album Top 100)	1
Finnish Albums (Suomen virallinen lista)	5
French Albums (SNEP)	4
German Albums (Offizielle Top 100)	5
Hungarian Albums (MAHASZ)	3
Icelandic Albums (Tónlistinn)	2
Irish Albums (Official Charts)	4
Italian Albums (FIMI)	8
Lithuanian Albums (AGATA)	2
New Zealand Albums (RMNZ)	1
Nigerian Albums (TurnTable)	5
Norwegian Albums (VG-lista)	1
Polish Albums (ZPAV)	6
Portuguese Albums (AFP)	2
Slovak Albums (ČNS IFPI)	1
Spanish Albums (Promusicae)	14
Swedish Albums (Sverigetopplistan)	3
Swiss Albums (Schweizer Hitparade)	1
UK Albums (Official Charts)	2
UK R&B Albums (Official Charts)	23
US Billboard 200	1
US Top R&B/Hip-Hop Albums (Billboard)	1

=== Year-end charts ===
2024 year-end chart performance for We Don't Trust You
Chart (2024)	Position
Australian Hip Hop/R&B Albums (ARIA)	29
Austrian Albums (Ö3 Austria)	73
Belgian Albums (Ultratop Flanders)	101
Canadian Albums (Billboard)	26
Danish Albums (Hitlisten)	96
French Albums (SNEP)	176
German Albums (Offizielle Top 100)	63
Hungarian Albums (MAHASZ)	33
Icelandic Albums (Tónlistinn)	21
New Zealand Albums (RMNZ)	40
Polish Albums (ZPAV)	97
Swiss Albums (Schweizer Hitparade)	40
US Billboard 200	15
US Top R&B/Hip-Hop Albums (Billboard)	3

2025 year-end chart performance for We Don't Trust You
Chart (2025)	Position
US Billboard 200	67
US Top R&B/Hip-Hop Albums (Billboard)	24

== Certifications ==
Certifications for We Don't Trust You
Region	Certification	Certified units/sales
Austria (IFPI Austria)	Gold	7,500^{‡}
Canada (Music Canada)	Platinum	80,000^{‡}
Denmark (IFPI Danmark)	Gold	10,000^{‡}
Hungary (MAHASZ)	Gold	2,000^{‡}
New Zealand (RMNZ)	Gold	7,500^{‡}
Poland (ZPAV)	Gold	10,000^{‡}
United Kingdom (BPI)	Gold	100,000^{‡}
^{‡} Sales+streaming figures based on certification alone.

== Release history ==
Release dates and formats for We Don't Trust You
Region	Date	Format(s)	Label(s)	Ref.
Various	March 22, 2024	Digital download; streaming	Wilburn Holding; Boominati; Epic; Republic	
