= We Still Don't Trust You (song) =

Single by Future, Metro Boomin, and the Weeknd

from the album We Still Don't Trust You
- Released: April 19, 2024
- Studio: Leading by Example (Atlanta)
- Genre: R&B
- Length: 4:12
- Label: Wilburn Holding; Boominati; Epic; Republic
- Songwriters: Nayvadius Wilburn; Leland Wayne; Abel Tesfaye; Michael Dean
- Producers: Metro Boomin; Mike Dean

Future singles chronology
"Like That" (2024)	"We Still Don't Trust You" (2024)	"Back to Back" (2024)

Metro Boomin singles chronology
"Like That" (2024)	"We Still Don't Trust You" (2024)	"Real Me" (2025)

The Weeknd singles chronology
"Young Metro" (2024)	"We Still Don't Trust You" (2024)	"Dancing in the Flames" (2024)

Music video
- "We Still Don't Trust You" on YouTube

"We Still Don't Trust You" is a song by American rapper Future, American record producer Metro Boomin, and Canadian singer-songwriter the Weeknd. It was sent to Italian radio airplay as the lead single from the former two's collaborative studio album of the same name on April 19, 2024. Its official music video was released six days earlier, which was a day after its parent album was released, and stars Canadian fashion model Winnie Harlow.

== Critical reception ==
Michael Saponara of Billboard ranked "We Still Don't Trust You" as the best song on the titular album. Saponara noted that the track contains "soft drums and a beeping noise that sounds like an EKG heart monitor set the stage of what's to come on this blockbuster with Future repeating the intro title before The Weeknd's ominous croon invades the premises".

Sputnikmusic's Dakota West Foss compared the sound of the song to that of the Weeknd's fifth studio album, Dawn FM (2022), rather than "something that plays to the image of the project's main duo, and that is genuinely a compliment".

== Accolades ==
Awards and nominations for "We Still Don't Trust You"
Organization	Year	Category	Result	Ref.
Grammy Awards	2025	Best Melodic Rap Performance	Nominated	

== Charts ==
Chart performance for "We Still Don't Trust You"
Chart (2024)	Peak position
Australia (ARIA)	66
Australia Hip Hop/R&B (ARIA)	12
Canada Hot 100 (Billboard)	21
Global 200 (Billboard)	21
Greece (IFPI)	18
Ireland (IRMA)	57
Lithuania (AGATA)	25
MENA (IFPI)	16
New Zealand Hot Singles (RMNZ)	5
Portugal (AFP)	97
Slovakia Singles Digital (ČNS IFPI)	77
Sweden Heatseeker (Sverigetopplistan)	12
Switzerland (Schweizer Hitparade)	57
UAE (IFPI)	15
UK Singles (Official Charts)	42
US Billboard Hot 100	22

== Certifications ==
Certifications for "We Still Don't Trust You"
Region	Certification	Certified units/sales
Canada (Music Canada)	Gold	40,000^{‡}
^{‡} Sales+streaming figures based on certification alone.
