= Like That (Future, Metro Boomin and Kendrick Lamar song) =

2024 single by Future, Metro Boomin and Kendrick Lamar

Single by Future, Metro Boomin and Kendrick Lamar

from the album We Don't Trust You
- Released: March 26, 2024
- Genre: Trap; hardcore hip-hop
- Length: 4:27
- Label: Freebandz; Boominati; Epic; Republic
- Songwriters: Nayvadius Wilburn; Leland Wayne; Kendrick Duckworth; Rodney Oliver; Joe Cooley; Kobe Hood; Nick Kobe; Lorenzo Patterson
- Producer: Metro Boomin

Future singles chronology
"Young Metro" (2024)	"Like That" (2024)	"We Still Don't Trust You" (2024)

Metro Boomin singles chronology
"Young Metro" (2024)	"Like That" (2024)	"We Still Don't Trust You" (2024)

Kendrick Lamar singles chronology
"The Hillbillies" (2023)	"Like That" (2024)	"Euphoria" (2024)

Audio video
- "Like That (Official Audio)" on YouTube

"Like That" is a song by American rappers Future and Kendrick Lamar and producer Metro Boomin. It was sent to US rhythmic radio through Freebandz, Boominati Worldwide, Epic Records, and Republic as the third and final single from Future and Metro's collaborative studio album, We Don't Trust You, on March 26, 2024.

Solely produced by Metro, the three artists wrote the song alongside Kobe Hood; Rodney-O & Joe Cooley are also credited as songwriters as the bass line contains samples of their 1986 song, "Everlasting Bass", which in turn samples Barry White's 1973 hit "I'm Gonna Love You Just a Little More Baby". "Like That" also has additional elements that contain samples of Eazy-E's 1989 single, "Eazy-Duz-It", and contains a vocal sample of Michel'le. A remix of the song featuring the American supergroup ¥$, composed of Kanye West and Ty Dolla Sign, was released exclusively on West's Yeezy website on April 20, 2024, and uploaded to West's YouTube the next day, crediting him as the sole main artist.

A trap and hardcore hip-hop song that is predominantly composed of lively percussions, "Like That" received acclaim from music critics, who primarily praised Lamar's performance and Metro's production. Lamar's verse, which attracted significant media coverage, is a diss aimed at fellow rappers Drake and J. Cole in response to their 2023 collaboration, "First Person Shooter". "Like That" was quickly met with commercial success, debuting atop the Billboard Hot 100, where it would spend three weeks, as well as topping the Global 200 and the Hot R&B/Hip-Hop Songs charts simultaneously. It was both Future and Lamar's third number-one single on the former chart, and Metro's first as a credited artist. The song also topped the Canadian Hot 100 and peaked within the top ten of several countries in Europe and Oceania.

== Background ==
On October 6, 2023, Drake released the song "First Person Shooter" as part of his album For All the Dogs with rapper J. Cole, in which the latter shouts out the two rappers and Kendrick Lamar as the "big three" of rap music. Additionally, Drake indirectly called out Metro Boomin in December 2023 for being a "tweet and deleter" after the latter posted a tweet on Twitter aimed at him.

Record producer Metro Boomin announced a collaboration with rapper Future, set to release in 2023. He later tweeted that he had lost three instrumentals due to a power outage. A trailer was released on YouTube, revealing the record's name to be We Don't Trust You. It was teased at Rolling Loud California 2024. It was released on March 22, 2024. "Like That" was licensed to US rhythmic radio and released as the final single of the album on March 26, 2024.

== Composition and lyrics ==
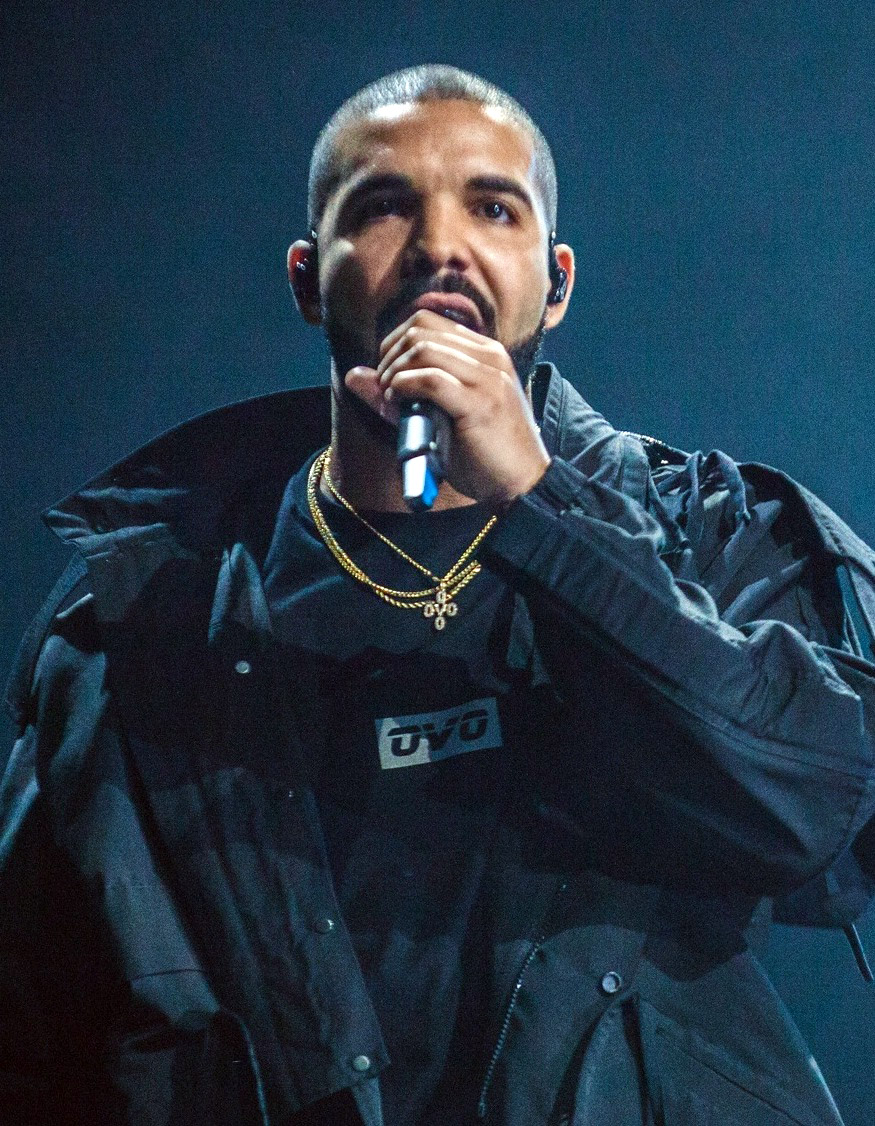
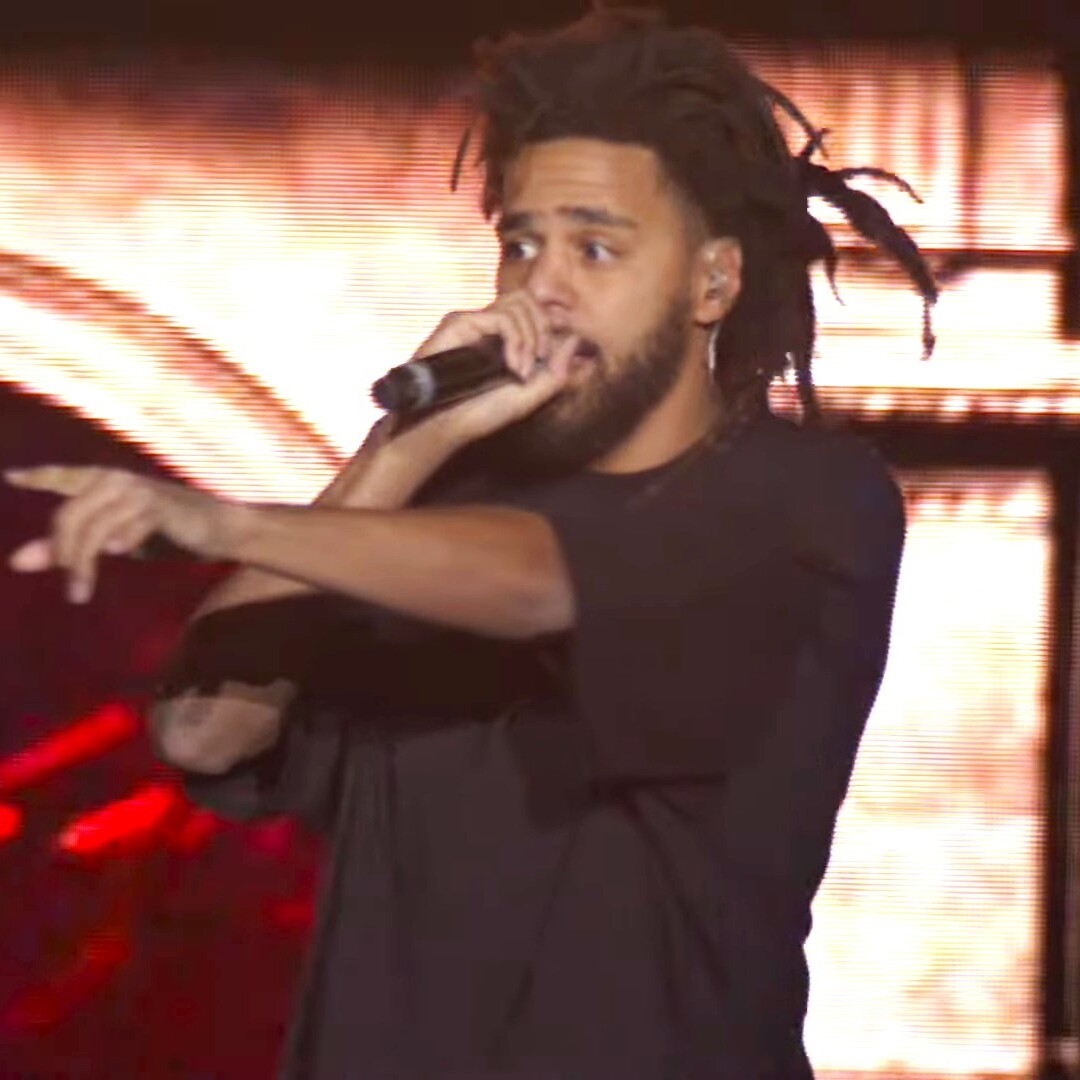
The song has been described as a response to Drake and J. Cole's "First Person Shooter", and is targeted at both artists.

"Like That" is a "bouncy" trap and hardcore hip-hop track driven by "rapid" and "uniquely southern" percussions, as well as a "menacing" bassline. It samples two songs: Rodney-O & Joe Cooley's "Everlasting Bass" (1988) and Eazy-E's "Eazy-Duz-It" (1989). Metro Boomin, who has greatly admired the former group, contacted Rodney-O through his record companies and asked for his permission to use the sped-up sample on "Like That". He approved after listening to a version of the song that cut off before Lamar's verse started.

Lyrically, Lamar uses his surprise feature to directly respond to "First Person Shooter", rapping: "Yeah, get up with me, fuck sneak dissing / "First Person Shooter", I hope they came with three switches". He also rejected J. Cole's idea of the three rappers representing hip-hop as its "big three" and claims that he alone takes the top spot: "Motherfuck the big three, nigga it's just big me". Throughout his verse, Lamar compares his rivalry with Drake to Prince's reported feud with Michael Jackson ("What? I'm really like that / And your best work is a light pack / Nigga, Prince outlived Mike Jack"). Drake has notably compared himself to Michael Jackson on numerous occasions, including during the final verse of "First Person Shooter", and Lamar has similarly compared himself to Prince. Lamar also makes references to the Click ("Niggas clickin' up, but cannot be legit / No 40 Water") and Stephen King's 1983 novel Pet Sematary ("'Fore all your dogs gettin' buried / That's a K with all these nines / He gon' see Pet Sematary").

== Critical reception ==
"Like That" received positive reviews from critics. Angel Diaz of Billboard ranked "Like That" as the third best song on We Don't Trust You. Diaz wrote that the track is "Hip-Hop in its purest form" and described it as "the album's thesis".

Andrew Sacher of BrooklynVegan argued that the Lamar appearance feels "like an event" and "another great one" at that, as he shows up in a "chest-out, no-bullshit mode" on the track. Carl Lamarre at Billboard thought that Lamar appeared on the track with "vitriol" while delivering "an explosive verse". HotNewHipHop's Alexander Cole called the beat a perfect fit for Future, "who glides over the track at the beginning and end". Dylan Green of Pitchfork felt that Lamar's verse provided the song's "showstopping" moment.

== Accolades ==
Awards and nominations for "Like That"
Organization	Year	Category	Result	Ref.
BET Hip Hop Awards	2024	Song of the Year	Nominated	
BET Hip Hop Awards	2024	Best Collaboration	Won	
BET Hip Hop Awards	2024	Sweet 16: Best Featured Verse	Won	
Grammy Awards	2025	Best Rap Performance	Nominated	
Grammy Awards	2025	Best Rap Song	Nominated	

== Responses ==
On April 5, on his mixtape Might Delete Later, J. Cole would go on to diss Lamar on the song "7 Minute Drill". 2 days later, Cole would go on to apologize to Lamar for the diss and later remove the track from all streaming platforms.

On April 13, a diss track by Drake, unofficially titled by fans as "Push Ups" or "Drop and Give Me 50", leaked on social media, targeting Future, Metro Boomin, Lamar, the Weeknd, and Rick Ross. Two versions of the track were leaked, the first containing a sample of Junior M.A.F.I.A.'s track "Get Money", most famously sampled in rapper Tupac Shakur's diss track "Hit 'Em Up", and the latter omitting the sample and adding an extended sung outro. On April 19, Drake officially released the latter version as "Push Ups".

On April 19, the same day as "Push Ups" was officially released, Drake posted a second diss track targeted at Lamar, titled "Taylor Made Freestyle", to his Instagram and Twitter profiles. The track featured AI vocals of Tupac Shakur and Snoop Dogg, as well as references to Taylor Swift's album The Tortured Poets Department, which was released on the same day. The track would later be deleted from Drake's profiles due to a lawsuit threat from Shakur's estate over the unauthorized use of the late rapper's AI vocals.

== Remix ==
"Like That Remix"
- Original remix cover

Remix by Future, Metro Boomin, and ¥$
- Released: April 21, 2024
- Recorded: April 2024
- Genre: Hardcore hip-hop; trap; progressive rap
- Length: 3:04
- Label: YZY
- Songwriters: Ye; Nayvadius Wilburn; Leland Wayne; Rodney Oliver; Joe Cooley; Kobe Hood; Tyrone Griffin Jr.; Samuel Lindley
- Producers: Metro Boomin; Ye; The Legendary Traxster

On April 20, 2024, the "Like That Remix" featuring Kanye West and Ty Dolla Sign, known collectively as ¥$, was previewed on radio stations. It was later played in full on Justin LaBoy's podcast, The Download. The remix was released the following day on West's website, Yeezy.com, as a video file that simply shows the song's cover with the song playing in the background. The song was later released on West's YouTube channel.

Lamar is absent from this remix. The remix features new vocals from the Inter Milan Ultras, who West refers to as the "Hooligans". They were also featured on ¥$'s 2024 hit song "Carnival" from their debut album, Vultures 1.

== Lawsuit ==
On May 13, 2025, Rodney-O filed a lawsuit against Metro Boomin, Future, and Kendrick Lamar, alleging unpaid royalties and lack of proper clearance of "Everlasting Bass" that was sampled for "Like That". The latter reason is due to the fact that Rodney-O was unaware of Lamar's verse, having been sent an earlier version with only Future on vocals. He would also allege that he had been left off of the footnotes for "Like That" during its Grammy nominations, stating:

"So, to come to me, take my record, make all this money, out on tour, do this and that and act like we're not a part of it? Even left me off the Grammy nominations. How can you do that? No respect at all and that's how a lot of old school artists get treated [...] At a time when I should be celebrating, I don't even want to hear the record."

Barry White's estate would sue Rodney-O after the release of "Like That", as the sample of "I'm Gonna Love You Just a Little More Baby" had never been cleared; a lawsuit Rodney-O has dismissed as a cash grab due to never being approached by White's estate prior to the success of the "Like That".

== Commercial performance ==
Upon the release of We Don't Trust You, "Like That" earned 10.26 million on-demand streams in the United States and 7.21 million streams on Spotify globally. It peaked atop the Spotify U.S. chart with 3.73 million first-day plays, besting its closest competitor by nearly 400,000 streams. Within its first three days of availability, the song accumulated 25.62 million streams in the country. Several of Drake's songs saw a noticeable increase in streams due to "Like That", such as "First Person Shooter" (10 percent) and "What Would Pluto Do" (34 percent).

"Like That" debuted at number one on the U.S. Billboard Hot 100 for the chart issue dated April 6, 2024, with 59.6 million streams, 9,000 digital downloads sold, and an airplay audience of 5.6 million. It marked Future and Lamar's third number-one single in the country and Metro's first as a billed recording artist, having co-written and co-produced previous chart-toppers "Heartless" by the Weeknd (2019) and "Bad and Boujee" by Migos featuring Lil Uzi Vert (2016). "Like That" also debuted atop the Billboard Global 200 with 91 million streams and 10,000 copies sold worldwide, becoming Future, Lamar, and Metro's first number-one single, and at number six on the Global Excl. US chart with 31.9 million streams.

The single premiered atop Billboard's Streaming Songs chart as Lamar's fourth, Future's third and Metro's first number-one song. It marked the largest opening week for a track since Taylor Swift's 2022 single "Anti-Hero" (59.7 million), and the best streaming week for a hip-hop song since Drake's 2021 single "Way 2 Sexy" featuring Future and Young Thug (67.3 million). Additionally earning the biggest streaming week of any song in the U.S. in 2024 so far, it tallied the most streams in a single week since Miley Cyrus' 2023 single "Flowers" (59.7 million streams during its second week of charting).

== Charts ==
=== Weekly charts ===
Weekly chart performance for "Like That"
Chart (2024)	Peak position
Australia (ARIA)	8
Australia Hip Hop/R&B (ARIA)	1
Austria (Ö3 Austria Top 40)	18
Canada Hot 100 (Billboard)	1
Croatia (Billboard)	23
Czech Republic Singles Digital (ČNS IFPI)	23
Denmark (Tracklisten)	21
Egypt (IFPI)	17
Finland (Suomen virallinen lista)	32
France (SNEP)	66
Germany (GfK)	65
Global 200 (Billboard)	1
Greece International Streaming (IFPI)	1
Hungary (Single Top 40)	23
Iceland (Tónlistinn)	3
Ireland (IRMA)	10
Israel (Mako Hitlist)	41
Italy (FIMI)	76
Latvia Streaming (LaIPA)	4
Lithuania (AGATA)	8
Luxembourg (Billboard)	5
Middle East and North Africa (IFPI)	1
Netherlands (Single Top 100)	31
New Zealand (Recorded Music NZ)	2
Nigeria (TurnTable Top 100)	54
North Africa (IFPI)	5
Norway (VG-lista)	13
Poland (Polish Streaming Top 100)	24
Portugal (AFP)	11
Romania (Billboard)	6
Saudi Arabia (IFPI)	2
Singapore (RIAS)	22
Slovakia Singles Digital (ČNS IFPI)	13
South Africa Streaming (TOSAC)	2
Sweden (Sverigetopplistan)	46
Switzerland (Schweizer Hitparade)	6
United Arab Emirates (IFPI)	2
UK Singles (Official Charts)	6
UK Hip Hop/R&B (Official Charts)	1
US Billboard Hot 100	1
US Hot R&B/Hip-Hop Songs (Billboard)	1
US Pop Airplay (Billboard)	34
US Rhythmic Airplay (Billboard)	1

=== Year-end charts ===
Year-end chart performance for "Like That"
Chart (2024)	Position
Australia (ARIA)	79
Australia Hip Hop/R&B (ARIA)	13
Canada (Canadian Hot 100)	32
Global 200 (Billboard)	45
Iceland (Tónlistinn)	34
New Zealand (Recorded Music NZ)	40
US Billboard Hot 100	14
US Hot R&B/Hip-Hop Songs (Billboard)	4
US Rhythmic (Billboard)	7
US R&B/Hip-Hop Airplay (Billboard)	7

== Certifications ==
Certifications for "Like That"
Region	Certification	Certified units/sales
Australia (ARIA)	Platinum	70,000^{‡}
Belgium (BRMA)	Gold	20,000^{‡}
Canada (Music Canada)	3× Platinum	240,000^{‡}
Denmark (IFPI Danmark)	Gold	45,000^{‡}
France (SNEP)	Gold	100,000^{‡}
Mexico (AMPROFON)	Gold	70,000^{‡}
New Zealand (RMNZ)	2× Platinum	60,000^{‡}
Poland (ZPAV)	Gold	25,000^{‡}
Portugal (AFP)	Platinum	10,000^{‡}
Switzerland (IFPI Switzerland)	Platinum	30,000^{‡}
United Kingdom (BPI)	Platinum	600,000^{‡}
Streaming
Central America (CFC)	Gold	3,500,000^{†}
Greece (IFPI Greece)	Platinum	2,000,000^{†}
^{‡} Sales+streaming figures based on certification alone.^{†} Streaming-only figures based on certification alone.

== Release history ==
Release dates and formats for "Like That"
Region	Date	Format(s)	Label(s)	Ref.
United States	March 26, 2024	Rhythmic crossover	Boominati; Freebandz; Republic	
United Kingdom	April 5, 2024	Mainstream radio	Boominati; Freebandz; Republic	
