= Jumpman (song) =

Single by Drake and Future

from the album What a Time to Be Alive
- Released: November 10, 2015
- Recorded: 2015
- Studio: Chalice (California)
- Genre: Trap
- Length: 3:25
- Label: Young Money; Cash Money; Republic; Freebandz; A1; Epic
- Songwriters: Aubrey Graham; Nayvadius Wilburn; Leland Wayne
- Producer: Metro Boomin

Drake singles chronology
"Right Hand" (2015)	"Jumpman" (2015)	"Work" (2016)

Future singles chronology
"March Madness" (2015)	"Jumpman" (2015)	"New Level" (2015)

"Jumpman" is a song by Canadian rapper Drake and American rapper Future from their collaborative mixtape What a Time to Be Alive (2015). The track was released as a single on November 10, 2015. It draws its name from the Nike Jumpman mascot inspired by a 1984 photograph of Michael Jordan.

== Critical reception ==
Spin's Matthew Ramirez wrote, "'Jumpman' is the Young Thug song, complete with a percussive, non-sequitur refrain and Drake attempting to mimic Young Thug’s idiosyncrasies—the result isn’t embarrassing so much as labored, and makes you wish for the real thing." The song hit the top 20 of the Billboard Hot 100, which was a first for Future.

== In the media ==
Kanye West released a promotional single titled "Facts" on December 31, 2015, in which he uses the same flow that Drake does in "Jumpman". On a March 5, 2016 episode of Saturday Night Live, on which Future was the musical guest, he performed the song during the show's opening monologue, with host Jonah Hill performing Drake's part. In April 2016, "Jumpman" was played during a medley at the 3rd iHeartRadio Music Awards. Also in April, Apple released a commercial for Apple Music featuring Taylor Swift rapping along to the song and accidentally falling down on the treadmill, which ultimately became popular and was dubbed as "Taylor vs Treadmill". Following the premiere of the commercial, downloads of the song increased by 431%. The song was also used in the opening credits of the 2016 film Central Intelligence.

== Commercial performance ==
Jumpman peaked at number 12 on the US Billboard Hot 100 chart in the week of November 7, 2015, prior to being released as a single. The song was eventually certified quadruple platinum by the Recording Industry Association of America for combined sales and streaming units of over four millions units. By March 2016, the song had sold 824,000 copies in the United States. In the UK, the song peaked at number 58 on the UK Singles Chart and was certified Gold by the British Phonographic Industry (BPI) for sales of over 400,000 units.

== Charts ==
=== Weekly charts ===
Chart (2015–2016)	Peak position
Australia (ARIA)	47
Belgium (Ultratip Bubbling Under Flanders)	40
Canada Hot 100 (Billboard)	44
France (SNEP)	90
Ireland (IRMA)	77
Netherlands (Single Top 100)	74
New Zealand Heatseekers (RMNZ)	4
Sweden Heatseeker (Sverigetopplistan)	4
Switzerland (Schweizer Hitparade)	75
UK Singles (OCC)	58
US Billboard Hot 100	12
US Hot R&B/Hip-Hop Songs (Billboard)	3
US Rhythmic Airplay (Billboard)	1

=== Year-end charts ===
Chart (2016)	Position
US Billboard Hot 100	37
US Hot R&B/Hip-Hop Songs (Billboard)	12
US Rhythmic (Billboard)	18

== Certifications ==
Region	Certification	Certified units/sales
Australia (ARIA)	3× Platinum	210,000^{‡}
Brazil (Pro-Música Brasil)	Platinum	60,000^{‡}
Canada (Music Canada)	Gold	40,000^{*}
Denmark (IFPI Danmark)	Gold	45,000^{‡}
Germany (BVMI)	Gold	200,000^{‡}
Italy (FIMI)	Gold	25,000^{‡}
New Zealand (RMNZ)	Gold	7,500^{*}
Portugal (AFP)	Gold	10,000^{‡}
United Kingdom (BPI)	Platinum	600,000^{‡}
United States (RIAA)	5× Platinum	5,000,000^{‡}
^{*} Sales figures based on certification alone.^{‡} Sales+streaming figures based on certification alone.
