= Metro Boomin =

American record producer (born 1993)

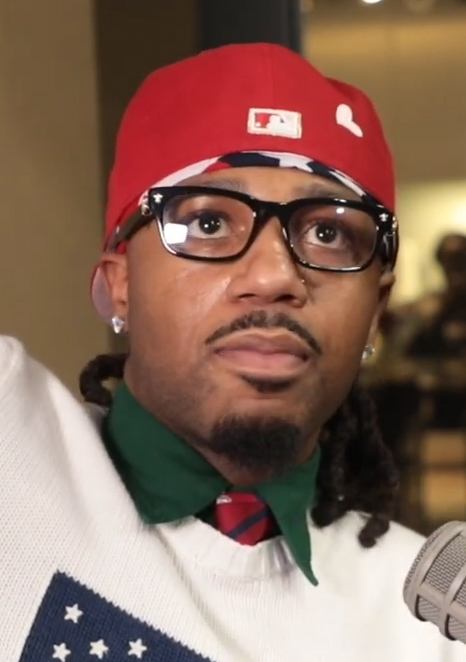
- Wayne in 2025

Background information
- Also known as: Young Metro; Lil Metro; Metro
- Born: Leland Tyler Wayne; September 16, 1993 (age 33); St. Louis, Missouri, U.S.
- Genres: Hip-hop; trap
- Occupations: Record producer; songwriter
- Works: Discography; production
- Years active: 2009–present
- Labels: Boominati; Republic; Mercury
- Member of: So Icey Boyz
- Website: boominatiworldwide.com

Leland Tyler Wayne (born September 16, 1993), known professionally as Metro Boomin, is an American record producer. Widely acclaimed for his dark and cinematic production style, he is regarded as one of the most influential producers in contemporary hip-hop and trap music. He has most notably worked with a string of artists including Future, 21 Savage, Migos, Gucci Mane, Kanye West, the Weeknd, Young Thug, Drake, and Travis Scott.

Born and raised in St. Louis, Missouri, Wayne began his career in music production in 2009 at the age of 16. He moved to Atlanta to attend Morehouse College in 2012, during which he worked extensively with various Atlanta-based artists. Wayne gained wider recognition for co-producing the 2014 single "Tuesday" for iLoveMakonnen, which peaked at number 12 on the Billboard Hot 100. He was credited on a string of similarly successful singles throughout 2016, including "Jumpman" by Drake and Future, "Father Stretch My Hands" by Kanye West, "Low Life" by Future, and his first number-one production, "Bad and Boujee" by Migos. This was followed by the diamond-certified (14× platinum) "Congratulations" by Post Malone, "Tunnel Vision" by Kodak Black, "Mask Off" by Future, "Bank Account" by 21 Savage, and his second number-one production, "Heartless" by the Weeknd.

As a credited lead artist, Wayne's debut studio album, Not All Heroes Wear Capes (2018), and its follow-up, Heroes & Villains (2022), both debuted atop the Billboard 200, along with his two collaborative albums with Future: We Don't Trust You (2024) and We Still Don't Trust You (2024). Heroes & Villains spawned the single "Creepin'" (with the Weeknd and 21 Savage), which peaked at number three on the Billboard Hot 100 and within the top ten of several countries. We Don't Trust You spawned the single "Like That" (with Future and Kendrick Lamar), which became his first number-one song on the chart as a lead performer. In addition, he has released the collaborative projects Savage Mode (2016) and Savage Mode II (2020) with 21 Savage, DropTopWop (2017) with Gucci Mane, Perfect Timing (2017) with Nav, and Double or Nothing (2017) with Big Sean.

== Early life ==
Leland Tyler Wayne was born on September 16, 1993, in St. Louis, Missouri, where he attended Parkway North High School. He is the son of Lamont and Leslie Joanne Wayne. He has four siblings. After a brief stint playing bass guitar in his middle school band, he turned to making beats in the seventh grade at age 13. This happened when his mother bought him a laptop and he got a copy of the music production software FL Studio, then known as FruityLoops. Metro is mostly self-taught, and in high school, he produced five beats a day. Initially, Wayne wanted to rap, and started making beats so that he could have music to rap over. However, he eventually turned his full attention toward hip-hop production. As he continued to hone his production skills in high school, he began to utilize social media platforms including Twitter to network with more established rap artists, as well as beat submissions for potential music placements.

== Career ==
=== 2009–2012: Career beginnings ===
During high school, Wayne's mother would often drive him for over eight hours from St. Louis to Atlanta, Georgia, to collaborate with artists he met with online. One of the first artists he worked with was Bricksquad Monopoly rapper Tay Don, which led to Wayne's acquaintance with label cohorts OJ da Juiceman and Gucci Mane. He soon met Atlanta-based rapper Future, who became one of his frequent collaborators. Upon his high school graduation, Wayne moved to Atlanta to attend Morehouse College, studying business management. He took a hiatus from school after one semester, due to the struggle of balancing his production and schoolwork.

During this time, Wayne became acquainted with burgeoning Atlanta-based rapper Future. The two first worked together on the song "Hard", which was included on DJ Esco's mixtape Welcome 2 Mollyworld (2012), and following Future's debut album, Pluto (2012), they reunited for his second, Honest (2014). Wayne produced the album's lead single, "Karate Chop", the title track alongside DJ Spinz, and its fifth single, "I Won", which features Kanye West.

=== 2013–2016: Rise to fame ===
In May 2013, Metro announced his debut mixtape, 19 & Boomin. Following several singles, featuring artists such as Trinidad James and Gucci Mane, Metro released the mixtape on LiveMixtapes, on October 7, 2013. The mixtape, all original songs, included "Maison Margiela", featuring Future, and "Some More", featuring Young Thug, both of which were subsequently released as music videos.

In March 2014, Metro and Young Thug announced that they would release a collaborative album, performed and released under the moniker "Metro Thuggin". The album was to be self-titled and was planned to be released sometime in 2015. Along with the announcement, the duo released the collaborative track, "The Blanguage". Photographer Cam Kirk claimed to have a copy of the complete, finished album. A few leaked tracks from the project were found circulating the internet in late 2015, yet an official mixtape has never been released.

In 2014, Metro made an appearance on Nicki Minaj's third studio album, The Pinkprint, producing the track "Want Some More".

In October 2014, Metro executive produced Future's Monster mixtape. This spawned the first appearance of the single "Fuck Up Some Commas". The song became a single a month after the album was released.

Metro served as executive producer for Drake and Future's collaborative mixtape What a Time to Be Alive, released on September 20, 2015. In addition, he produced or co-produced seven of the 11 tracks on the mixtape.

Metro served alongside DJ Esco as executive producer for Future's 2016 mixtape, Purple Reign. In 2016, he won Producer of the Year at the BET Hip Hop Awards.

In 2016, Metro Boomin was credited with produced charting hits such as "Jumpman" by Future and Drake, "Bad and Boujee" by Migos ft. Lil Uzi Vert, "Low Life" by Future ft. The Weeknd, and the 21 Savage collaboration "X" ft. Future. That year, he contributed to Kanye West's The Life of Pablo, and he and 21 Savage released the EP Savage Mode. In 2017, he produced the top 10 hit "Tunnel Vision" by Kodak Black, "Bounce Back" by Big Sean, "Mask Off" by Future, and the top 20 hit "Bank Account" by 21 Savage.

=== 2017: Perfect Timing, Without Warning, Double or Nothing ===
On June 23, 2017, Metro produced "Hammer Time" by Christian rappers Lecrae and 1K Phew. On July 14, 2017, Metro and fellow record producer and rapper Nav released two singles, "Perfect Timing (Intro)" and "Call Me", the dual lead singles from their collaborative mixtape, Perfect Timing. The mixtape was released by Boominati Worldwide, XO, and Republic Records, one week later, on July 21. It features guest appearances from Lil Uzi Vert, Playboi Carti, Offset of Migos, 21 Savage, Belly, and Gucci Mane.

On October 31, 2017, Metro and rappers 21 Savage and Offset released their collaborative studio album, Without Warning, as a surprise release. On the same day, "Ric Flair Drip", performed by Metro and Offset, was released as the lead single. The album features guest appearances from Travis Scott and Quavo of Migos.

On November 3, 2017, Metro and rapper Big Sean released a single titled "Pull Up n Wreck", featuring rapper 21 Savage, the lead single from their collaborative studio album, Double or Nothing. The project was released on December 8, 2017. It features guest appearances from Travis Scott, 2 Chainz, 21 Savage, Kash Doll, Young Thug, and Swae Lee. On February 13, 2018, "So Good", featuring Kash Doll became the lead single.

=== 2018–2021: Not All Heroes Wear Capes and Savage Mode II ===
In January 2018, Metro Boomin was featured in a Gap campaign with singer SZA, alongside a self-produced remix of "Hold Me Now". The remix was released to digital platforms on the same day as the campaign. In an interview with XXL, explaining the campaign with Gap and the remix, he stated;

To remix the song, it was really about the [original] track leading the direction, I kept the rhythm of the song more uptempo, more of their style, with that old-school feel. But I put the 808s on it just to have that bounce. It was about mixing both worlds but not really losing the essence of the original.

In April 2018, Metro Boomin announced his "retirement" from rap on his Instagram page, changing his bio to "Retired record producer/DJ". However, he since garnered production credits on Nicki Minaj's fourth studio album, Queen, as well as Minaj's labelmate Lil Wayne, on his twelfth studio album, Tha Carter V, which both debuted in the top 2 of the Billboard 200.

On October 26, 2018, multiple billboards appeared in Atlanta and New York depicting Metro Boomin as a "missing person". It was later revealed to be a teaser for his debut studio album, Not All Heroes Wear Capes, for his comeback, which he had been working on since 2015. The album was released on November 2, 2018, and features guest appearances from Gucci Mane, Travis Scott, 21 Savage, Swae Lee, Gunna, Young Thug, Wizkid, J. Balvin, Offset, Kodak Black, and Drake. Not All Heroes Wear Capes debuted at number one on the Billboard 200 and number 16 on the UK Top 40 Albums.

On February 22, 2019, he co-produced Offset's debut album, Father of 4. The album received mostly positive reviews.

On November 27, 2019, he co-produced The Weeknd's fourth Billboard Hot 100 number-one single, "Heartless", with Illangelo, Dre Moon, and The Weeknd himself. The song was released as the lead single from the singer's fourth studio album, After Hours (2020). Metro also helped produce three other tracks on the album, "Escape from LA", "Faith", and "Until I Bleed Out".

On September 29, 2020, Metro and 21 Savage announced their fourth collaborative project, Savage Mode II, a sequel to their EP, Savage Mode (2016). It features guest appearances from Drake, Young Thug, and Young Nudy. On October 13, 2020, the dual lead singles became "Runnin" and "Mr. Right Now", the latter of which features Drake. The album was released on October 2, 2020, and debuted atop on the Billboard 200 chart, earning both artists their second number-one albums, which were also back-to-back for both artists.

=== 2022–2023: Heroes & Villains and Spider-Man: Across the Spider-Verse ===
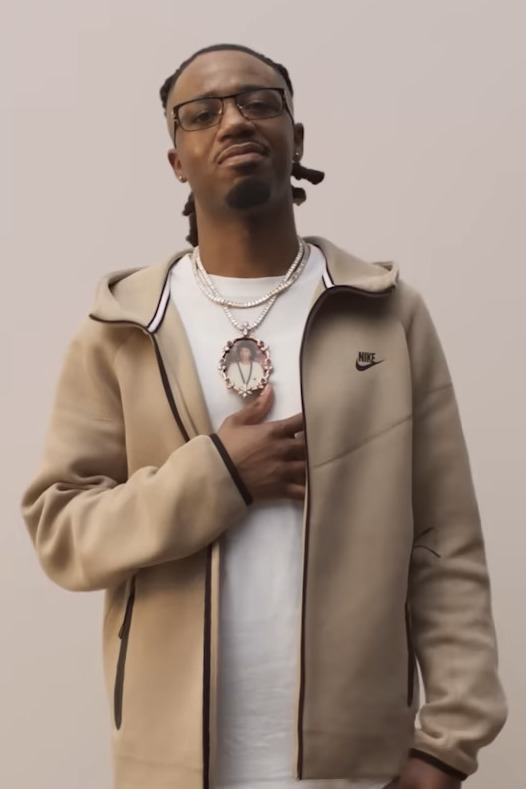
Metro Boomin in 2023

On November 22, 2022, Metro announced the title of his upcoming second studio album: Heroes & Villains, which released on December 2. On November 30, he released an accompanying short film preview for the album. The film was directed by Gibson Hazard and featured appearances by Metro, Gunna, LaKeith Stanfield, Morgan Freeman, and Young Thug.

The album was released on December 2, 2022, with guest appearances from John Legend, Future, Chris Brown, Don Toliver, Travis Scott, Young Nudy, The Weeknd, 21 Savage, Young Thug, Mustafa, A$AP Rocky, the late Takeoff of Migos, and Gunna. The album was received well by audiences, with many considering it Metro's best work to date and complimenting the production and featured artists' performances.

On December 13, 2022, Metro was confirmed to be working on the soundtrack for Spider-Man: Across the Spider-Verse by screenwriters Phil Lord and Christopher Miller. The soundtrack was released on June 2, 2023, the same day as the film's theatrical release. Metro served as an executive producer and its presenter, having credits on 10 out of 13 songs. The soundtrack featured guest appearances from Swae Lee, Lil Wayne, Offset, A$AP Rocky, Roisee, Future, Lil Uzi Vert, JID, James Blake, Nav, A Boogie wit da Hoodie, Ei8ht, Don Toliver, Wizkid, Beam, Toian, Coi Leray, 21 Savage, 2 Chainz, and Nas. Metro also provided the voice for "Metro Spider-Man", a fictional version of himself as Spider-Man in the film.

Metro performed at the 22nd Coachella Valley Music and Arts Festival in April 2023. On June 23, 2023, Metro Boomin co-produced Young Thug's third studio album, Business Is Business. He also served as the executive producer of the album. Metro produced the lobby theme track for Fortnite Battle Royale Chapter 4 Season OG, released in November 2023.

=== 2024–present: We Don't Trust You, We Still Don't Trust You, and A Futuristic Summa ===
On March 22, 2024, Metro released We Don't Trust You, a collaborative studio album with Future. The album contained guest appearances from The Weeknd, Travis Scott, Playboi Carti, Kendrick Lamar, and Rick Ross. The album debuted atop the US Billboard 200 with the biggest opening week of 2024 at the time of its release. A single from the album, "Like That" with Kendrick Lamar, was quickly met with commercial success, debuting atop the Billboard Hot 100, Global 200, and Hot R&B/Hip-Hop Songs charts simultaneously. It was both Future and Lamar's third number-one single on the former chart, and Metro's first as a credited artist.

On April 12, 2024, Metro and Future released a sequel with We Still Don't Trust You. The album contained guest appearances from the Weeknd, Chris Brown, Brownstone, Ty Dolla Sign, Kanye West, J. Cole, Lil Baby, and ASAP Rocky. The album debuted atop the US Billboard 200, like its predecessor.

In response to being dissed by Drake in "Push Ups" and "Family Matters" during the Drake–Kendrick Lamar feud, he released "BBL Drizzy", an instrumental diss track. "BBL Drizzy" quickly went viral, generating more than 3.3 million streams on SoundCloud within a week.

Ahead of Bad Blood, a WWE event being hosted in Atlanta, it was announced on September 27, 2024, that Metro and Future's song from We Don't Trust You, titled GTA, would be used as the official song for the event. Metro would also appear in multiple promotional videos for the event alongside Cody Rhodes.

In 2025, Metro announced his mixtape A Futuristic Summa, which released on July 22, 2025. A Futuristic Summa was released on August 1, 2025.

== Musical style ==
Specializing in the trap sub-genre of hip-hop, Metro Boomin utilizes a distinctive mix of heavy, booming bass, rattling synthetic percussion and dark, gothic melodies. He usually produces songs for hip-hop, although he produced four tracks for Canadian singer-songwriter the Weeknd's fourth studio album, After Hours (2020), which is primarily an 80s-inspired R&B album; in addition, he has remixed pop songs such as "Hold Me Now" (produced as a Gap marketing collaboration).

=== Producer tags ===
In hip-hop, producers may choose to mark their work with a producer tag, a catchy shout-out usually placed at the beginning of a song which allows listeners to recognize and appreciate certain producers. Metro has been credited for making this technique more compelling on specific tracks.

His first producer tag was "This beat is so, so Metro" and it was used in songs like "Karate Chop (Remix)", "Ugly" by Soulja Boy and "Chanel Vintage" in 2013–2014.

One of Metro's more viral tags, "Metro Boomin want some more, nigga", originates from vocals of the Boomin-produced song "Some More" by Young Thug, and received widespread attention in early 2016.

Metro's most prominent and iconic tag, "If Young Metro don't trust you, I'm gon' shoot you", is performed by Future. The tag originates in the song "Right Now" by Uncle Murda, also produced by Boomin. The tag appeared first in Drake and Future's 2015 song, "Jumpman", from the collaborative mixtape What a Time to Be Alive, and gained widespread attention after its use in the Kanye West song "Father Stretch My Hands, Pt. 1".

Another well-known tag is "Young Metro, young Metro, young Metro" spoken by his longtime collaborator Future. Boomin often references "3x" or "Young Metro 3x" as a nod to this particular tag.

Another one of Metro's tags is just "Metro!", originally spoken by Young Thug on his song "Hercules". The tag can be most prominently heard at the beginning of the Metro-produced song "Mr. Right Now" by 21 Savage and Drake, off the tape Savage Mode II, as well as appearing various times in Heroes & Villains.. The tag was featured extensively on Metro's soundtrack album Spider-Man: Across the Spider-Verse. This tag was also recently used in the "Re-OG" Fortnite lobby music which went viral on social media.

Another one of Metro's tags, "Metro in this bitch goin' brazy", can be heard in the track "More M's" from 21 Savage's and Drake's album Her Loss. The tag originated from the track "No Opp Left Behind" from Savage Mode II.

The latest version of Metro's tag, "Metro!" with the vocals from Playboi Carti, is featured on Carti's latest studio album, MUSIC, on the song "RADAR".

== Personal life ==
Wayne's mother, Leslie Joanne Wayne, was killed in a murder-suicide by her husband on June 3, 2022. Later that year, Wayne partnered with the Steve & Marjorie Harvey Foundation to launch the "Single Moms Are Superheroes" initiative. The program provides financial assistance, community resources, and family programming for single mothers in the greater Metro Atlanta area.

In December 2023, Wayne received a key to the city from St. Louis' mayor, Tishaura Jones.

In August 2024, Wayne announced the "Leslie Joanne Single Moms Are Superheroes" grant-giving program. In conjunction with Wayne and Future's We Trust You Tour, the grant offered $20,000 and concert tickets to non-profit organizations supporting single mothers in each city on the tour.

Wayne is an avid fan of professional wrestling, specifically WWE, and has been spotted attending events on multiple occasions, and has even offered to create music for the company.

=== Sexual assault allegations ===
On October 29, 2024, Wayne was sued for sexual assault of a woman, named Vanessa LeMaistre, which allegedly happened in Los Angeles in September 2016. In the lawsuit that was filed in the Superior Court of Los Angeles, the woman alleged that she visited the producer at a recording studio in California, where she was given an alcoholic beverage and swallowed half a Xanax, an anxiety medication she was taking after the loss of her son. After consuming both substances, she lost consciousness and woke up in a hotel room in Beverly Hills, while Wayne was allegedly raping her. The woman claimed she passed out again, and woke up to Wayne performing oral sex on her. A few weeks after the alleged assault, LeMaistre found out she was pregnant and underwent an abortion due to her deteriorating mental health. The lawsuit also referred to the lyrics of a song "Rap Saved Me" by 21 Savage, Offset, Metro Boomin and Quavo, which include the lines: “She took a Xanny, then she fainted/ I'm from the gutter, ain’t no changing/ From the gutter, rap saved me/ She drive me crazy, have my baby.” The woman believes the lyrics recount the alleged assault and resulting pregnancy. It also pointed to tweets posted by Wayne, including the deleted ones, that are indicative of "his intentions to hurt women". One of the tweets quoted in the lawsuit appeared to refer to sexual activity under the influence of a party drug, MDMA: "She gon suck me whether she like it or not. That's what the molly for." LeMaistre sought compensation for mental anguish and legal punishment for Wayne.

Wayne's lawyer, Lawrence Hinkle II, denied the accusations and said Wayne will defend himself in court, and "file a claim for malicious prosecution once he prevails." In response to Hinkle's statement, Michael J. Willemin, one of LaMaistre's attorneys, said that "making defamatory remarks is not going to help Metro Boomin's case".

On 25 September 2025, Wayne was unanimously found not liable on all counts after an hour of deliberation by jurors, with one juror citing a lack of evidence brought forward by LaMaistre as a key factor behind the decision. Wayne said in a statement later that day that he was ‘grateful and thankful to God [to] put all of this nonsense behind [him]’.

== Boominati Worldwide ==
Boominati Worldwide
- Parent company: Universal Music Group
- Founded: June 2017; 9 years ago
- Founder: Metro Boomin
- Distributor: Republic Records
- Genre: Various, with a focus on hip-hop and trap music
- Country of origin: United States
- Official website: boominatiworldwide.com

Boominati Worldwide is a record label founded by Wayne in June 2017. It was launched as an imprint of Republic Records, a division of Universal Music Group. That same month, Wayne stated that:

"Launching Boominati Worldwide is the next step in my career as a producer, an artist and a businessman. I created the label to represent a collective of highly gifted individuals who have the shared gift of being able to influence the world through culture and art".

Notable producers who work for Boominati include Dre Moon, Chopsquad DJ, Doughboy Beatz, Chris Xz, Mike McTaggart, Scriptplugg, Bbykobe, Notinbed, Peter Lee Johnson and DAVID x ELI.

== Discography ==
Studio albums

- Not All Heroes Wear Capes (2018)
- Heroes & Villains (2022)

Collaborative albums

- Perfect Timing (with NAV) (2017)
- Without Warning (with 21 Savage and Offset) (2017)
- Double or Nothing (with Big Sean) (2017)
- Savage Mode II (with 21 Savage) (2020)
- We Don't Trust You (with Future) (2024)
- We Still Don't Trust You (with Future) (2024)
- God Doesn't Like Ugly (with JID) (TBA)

Soundtrack albums

- Metro Boomin Presents Spider-Man: Across the Spider-Verse (Soundtrack from and Inspired by the Motion Picture) (2023)

== Filmography ==
Film
| Year | Title | Role | Notes | Ref. |
|---|---|---|---|---|
| 2023 | Spider-Man: Across the Spider-Verse | Metro Spider-Man (voice) | Cameo; credited as Leland 'Metro Boomin' Wayne; Also executive music producer | |
| 2025 | Hurry Up Tomorrow | Himself | Cameo; credited as Metro Boomin | |

== Awards and nominations ==
| Award | Year | Category | Nominated Work | Result | Ref. |
|---|---|---|---|---|---|
| Annie Awards | 2024 | Outstanding Achievement for Music in an Animated Feature Production | Himself and Daniel Pemberton | Won | |
| ARIA Music Awards | 2023 | Best International Artist | Heroes & Villains | Nominated | |
| ASCAP Rhythm & Soul Music Awards | 2024 | Award Winning Songs | "Creepin" (with The Weeknd & 21 Savage) | Won | |
| ASCAP Rhythm & Soul Music Awards | 2024 | Award Winning Songs | "Superhero (Heroes & Villains)" (with Future & Chris Brown) | Won | |
| ASCAP Rhythm & Soul Music Awards | 2025 | Award Winning Songs | "Like That" (with Future & Kendrick Lamar) | Won | |
| ASCAP Rhythm & Soul Music Awards | 2025 | Award Winning Songs | "Type Shit" (with Future, Travis Scott & Playboi Carti) | Won | |
| BMI R&B/Hip-Hop Awards | 2016 | Producer of the Year | Himself | Won | |
| BMI R&B/Hip-Hop Awards | 2017 | Producer of the Year | Himself | Won | |
| BMI R&B/Hip-Hop Awards | 2024 | Award Winning Songs | "Creepin" (with The Weeknd & 21 Savage) | Won | |
| BMI R&B/Hip-Hop Awards | 2024 | Award Winning Songs | "Superhero (Heroes & Villains)" (with Future & Chris Brown) | Won | |
| BMI R&B/Hip-Hop Awards | 2024 | Award Winning Songs | "Trance" (with Travis Scott and Young Thug) | Won | |
| BMI R&B/Hip-Hop Awards | 2025 | Top Producers | Himself | Won | |
| BMI R&B/Hip-Hop Awards | 2025 | Award Winning Songs | "Type Shit" (with Future, Travis Scott & Playboi Carti) | Won | |
| BET Awards | 2021 | Best Group | Himself and 21 Savage | Nominated | |
| BET Awards | 2023 | Best Collaboration | "Creepin" (with The Weeknd & 21 Savage) | Nominated | |
| BET Awards | 2025 | Album of the Year | We Don't Trust You | Nominated | |
| BET Awards | 2025 | Video of the Year | "Type Shit" (with Future, Travis Scott & Playboi Carti) | Nominated | |
| BET Awards | 2025 | Viewer's Choice Award | "Like That" (with Future & Kendrick Lamar) | Nominated | |
| BET Awards | 2025 | Best Collaboration | "Like That" (with Future & Kendrick Lamar) | Nominated | |
| BET Awards | 2025 | Best Group | Himself and Future | Won | |
| BET Awards | 2026 | Best Group | Himself and DJ Spinz | Nominated | |
| BET Awards | 2026 | Best Collaboration | "Take Me Thru Dere" (with Quavo, Breskii, YK Niece & DJ Spinz) | Nominated | |
| BET Awards | 2026 | Viewer's Choice Award | "Take Me Thru Dere" (with Quavo, Breskii, YK Niece & DJ Spinz) | Nominated | |
| BET Hip Hop Awards | 2016 | Producer of the Year | Himself | Won | |
| BET Hip Hop Awards | 2017 | Producer of the Year | Himself | Won | |
| BET Hip Hop Awards | 2018 | Producer of the Year | Himself | Nominated | |
| BET Hip Hop Awards | 2018 | Best Collaboration, Duo or Group | "Ric Flair Drip" (with 21 Savage & Offset) | Nominated | |
| BET Hip Hop Awards | 2019 | Producer of the Year | Himself | Nominated | |
| BET Hip Hop Awards | 2021 | Producer of the Year | Himself | Nominated | |
| BET Hip Hop Awards | 2021 | Best Duo/Group | Himself and 21 Savage | Nominated | |
| BET Hip Hop Awards | 2021 | Hip Hop Album of the Year | Savage Mode II (with 21 Savage) | Nominated | |
| BET Hip Hop Awards | 2021 | Best Collaboration | "Mr. Right Now" (with 21 Savage & Drake) | Nominated | |
| BET Hip Hop Awards | 2022 | Producer of the Year | Himself | Nominated | |
| BET Hip Hop Awards | 2023 | DJ of the Year | Himself | Won | |
| BET Hip Hop Awards | 2023 | Producer of the Year | Himself | Won | |
| BET Hip Hop Awards | 2023 | Hip Hop Album of the Year | Heroes & Villains | Nominated | |
| BET Hip Hop Awards | 2024 | DJ of the Year | Himself | Nominated | |
| BET Hip Hop Awards | 2024 | Producer of the Year | Himself | Nominated | |
| BET Hip Hop Awards | 2024 | Best Duo/Group | Himself & Future | Won | |
| BET Hip Hop Awards | 2024 | Best Hip Hop Video | "Type Shit" (with Future, Travis Scott & Playboi Carti) | Nominated | |
| BET Hip Hop Awards | 2024 | Song of the Year | "Like That" (with Future & Kendrick Lamar) | Nominated | |
| BET Hip Hop Awards | 2024 | Best Collaboration | "Like That" (with Future & Kendrick Lamar) | Won | |
| Billboard Music Awards | 2023 | Top Hot 100 Producer | Himself | Nominated | |
| Billboard Music Awards | 2023 | Top Rap Artist | Himself | Nominated | |
| Billboard Music Awards | 2023 | Top Billboard 200 Album | Heroes & Villains | Nominated | |
| Billboard Music Awards | 2023 | Top Rap Album | Heroes & Villains | Nominated | |
| Billboard Music Awards | 2023 | Top Hot 100 Song | "Creepin" (with The Weeknd & 21 Savage) | Nominated | |
| Billboard Music Awards | 2023 | Top Radio Song | "Creepin" (with The Weeknd & 21 Savage) | Nominated | |
| Billboard Music Awards | 2023 | Top Collaboration | "Creepin" (with The Weeknd & 21 Savage) | Won | |
| Billboard Music Awards | 2023 | Top R&B Song | "Creepin" (with The Weeknd & 21 Savage) | Nominated | |
| Billboard Music Awards | 2024 | Top Rap Artist | Himself | Nominated | |
| Billboard Music Awards | 2024 | Top Rap Album | We Don't Trust You (with Future) | Nominated | |
| Billboard Music Awards | 2024 | Top Collaboration | "Like That" (with Future & Kendrick Lamar) | Nominated | |
| Billboard Music Awards | 2024 | Top Rap Song | "Like That" (with Future & Kendrick Lamar) | Nominated | |
| Black Reel Awards | 2024 | Outstanding Soundtrack | Metro Boomin Presents Spider-Man: Across the Spider-Verse (Soundtrack from and Inspired by the Motion Picture) | Nominated | |
| Black Reel Awards | 2024 | Outstanding Original Song | "Am I Dreaming" (with ASAP Rocky & Roisee) | Nominated | |
| Brit Awards | 2025 | International Group of the Year | Himself & Future | Nominated | |
| Clio Music Awards | 2024 | Album Launch/Artist Promotion Integrated Campaign (Integrated Campaign) | Metro Boomin Presents Spider-Man: Across the Spider-Verse (Soundtrack from and Inspired by the Motion Picture) | Bronze | |
| Clio Music Awards | 2024 | Album Launch/Artist Promotion Integrated Campaign (Integrated Campaign) | Heroes & Villains | Shortlisted | |
| Denver Film Critics Society | 2024 | Best Original Song | "Am I Dreaming" (with ASAP Rocky & Roisee) | Nominated | |
| Georgia Film Critics Association | 2024 | Best Original Song | "Am I Dreaming" (with ASAP Rocky & Roisee) | Nominated | |
| Grammy Awards | 2023 | Album of the Year (Note: as producer on "Let Somebody Go") | Music of the Spheres | Nominated | |
| Grammy Awards | 2024 | Producer of the Year, Non-Classical | Himself | Nominated | |
| Grammy Awards | 2024 | Best Rap Album | Heroes & Villains | Nominated | |
| Grammy Awards | 2025 | Best Rap Album | We Don't Trust You (with Future) | Nominated | |
| Grammy Awards | 2025 | Best Rap Performance | "Like That" (with Future & Kendrick Lamar) | Nominated | |
| Grammy Awards | 2025 | Best Rap Song | "Like That" (with Future & Kendrick Lamar) | Nominated | |
| Grammy Awards | 2025 | Best Melodic Rap Performance | "We Still Don't Trust You" (with Future & The Weeknd) | Nominated | |
| Guild of Music Supervisors Awards | 2024 | Best Song Written and/or Recorded for a Film | "Am I Dreaming" (with ASAP Rocky & Roisee) | Nominated | |
| Hollywood Music in Media Awards | 2023 | Original Song – Animated Film | "Am I Dreaming" (with ASAP Rocky & Roisee) | Nominated | |
| Hollywood Music in Media Awards | 2023 | Soundtrack Album | Metro Boomin Presents Spider-Man: Across the Spider-Verse (Soundtrack from and Inspired by the Motion Picture) | Nominated | |
| iHeartRadio Music Awards | 2024 | Album of the Year - Hip Hop | Heroes & Villains | Won | |
| iHeartRadio Music Awards | 2024 | Song of the Year | "Creepin" (with The Weeknd & 21 Savage) | Nominated | |
| iHeartRadio Music Awards | 2024 | Best Collaboration | "Creepin" (with The Weeknd & 21 Savage) | Nominated | |
| iHeartRadio Music Awards | 2024 | R&B Song of the Year | "Creepin" (with The Weeknd & 21 Savage) | Nominated | |
| iHeartRadio Music Awards | 2025 | Album of the Year - Hip Hop | We Don't Trust You (with Future) | Won | |
| iHeartRadio Music Awards | 2025 | Best Collaboration | "Like That" (with Future & Kendrick Lamar) | Nominated | |
| iHeartRadio Music Awards | 2025 | Hip-Hop Song of the Year | "Like That" (with Future & Kendrick Lamar) | Nominated | |
| iHeartRadio Music Awards | 2025 | Favorite Surprise Guest | Future and Metro Boomin – Travis Scott | Nominated | |
| iHeartRadio Titanium Awards | 2023 | 1 Billion Total Audience Spins on iHeartRadio Stations | "Creepin'" (with The Weeknd & 21 Savage) | Won | |
| Juno Awards | 2024 | International Album of the Year | Heroes & Villains | Nominated | |
| MTV Europe Music Awards | 2023 | Best Hip-Hop | Himself | Nominated | |
| MTV Europe Music Awards | 2023 | Best Collaboration | "Creepin" (with The Weeknd & 21 Savage) | Nominated | |
| MTV Europe Music Awards | 2024 | Best Collaboration | "Like That" (with Future & Kendrick Lamar) | Nominated | |
| MTV Video Music Awards | 2023 | Best Collaboration | "Creepin" (Remix) (with The Weeknd, 21 Savage & Diddy) | Nominated | |
| MTV Video Music Awards | 2023 | Best R&B | "Creepin" (Remix) (with The Weeknd, 21 Savage & Diddy) | Nominated | |
| MTV Video Music Awards | 2023 | Best Hip Hop | "Superhero (Heroes & Villains)" (with Future) | Nominated | |
| MTV Video Music Awards | 2023 | Album of the Year | Heroes & Villains | Nominated | |
| MTV Video Music Awards | 2024 | Song of Summer | "Like That" (with Future & Kendrick Lamar) | Nominated | |
| NAACP Image Awards | 2024 | Outstanding Soundtrack/Compilation Album | Metro Boomin Presents Spider-Man: Across the Spider-Verse (Soundtrack from and Inspired by the Motion Picture) | Nominated | |
| New Mexico Film Critics | 2023 | Best Original Song | "Am I Dreaming" (with ASAP Rocky & Roisee) | Nominated | |
| North Carolina Film Critics Association | 2023 | Best Original Song | "Am I Dreaming" (with ASAP Rocky & Roisee) | Nominated | |
| Online Film & Television Association | 2023 | Best Original Song | "Am I Dreaming" (with ASAP Rocky & Roisee) | Nominated | |
| Swiss Music Awards | 2025 | Best Group International | Himself & Future | Nominated | |
| Variety's Hitmakers | 2023 | Producer of the Year | Himself | Won | |
| XXL Awards | 2023 | Producer of the Year | Himself | Nominated | |
| XXL Awards | 2024 | Producer of the Year | Himself | Won | |
| XXL Awards | 2025 | Producer of the Year | Himself | Nominated | |
| XXL Awards | 2025 | Song of the Year | "Like That" (with Future & Kendrick Lamar) | Nominated | |
| XXL Awards | 2025 | Album of the Year | We Don't Trust You | Nominated | |
| XXL Awards | 2026 | Producer of the Year | Himself | Won | |
| XXL Awards | 2026 | Viral Song of the Year | “Take Me Thru Dere” (with Quavo, YKNiece, Breskii and DJ Spinz) | Won | |
| XXL Awards | 2026 | Song of the Year | “Take Me Thru Dere” (with Quavo, YKNiece, Breskii and DJ Spinz) | Nominated | |
