= Billboard Year-End Hot 100 singles of 2023 =

Ranking of recorded music

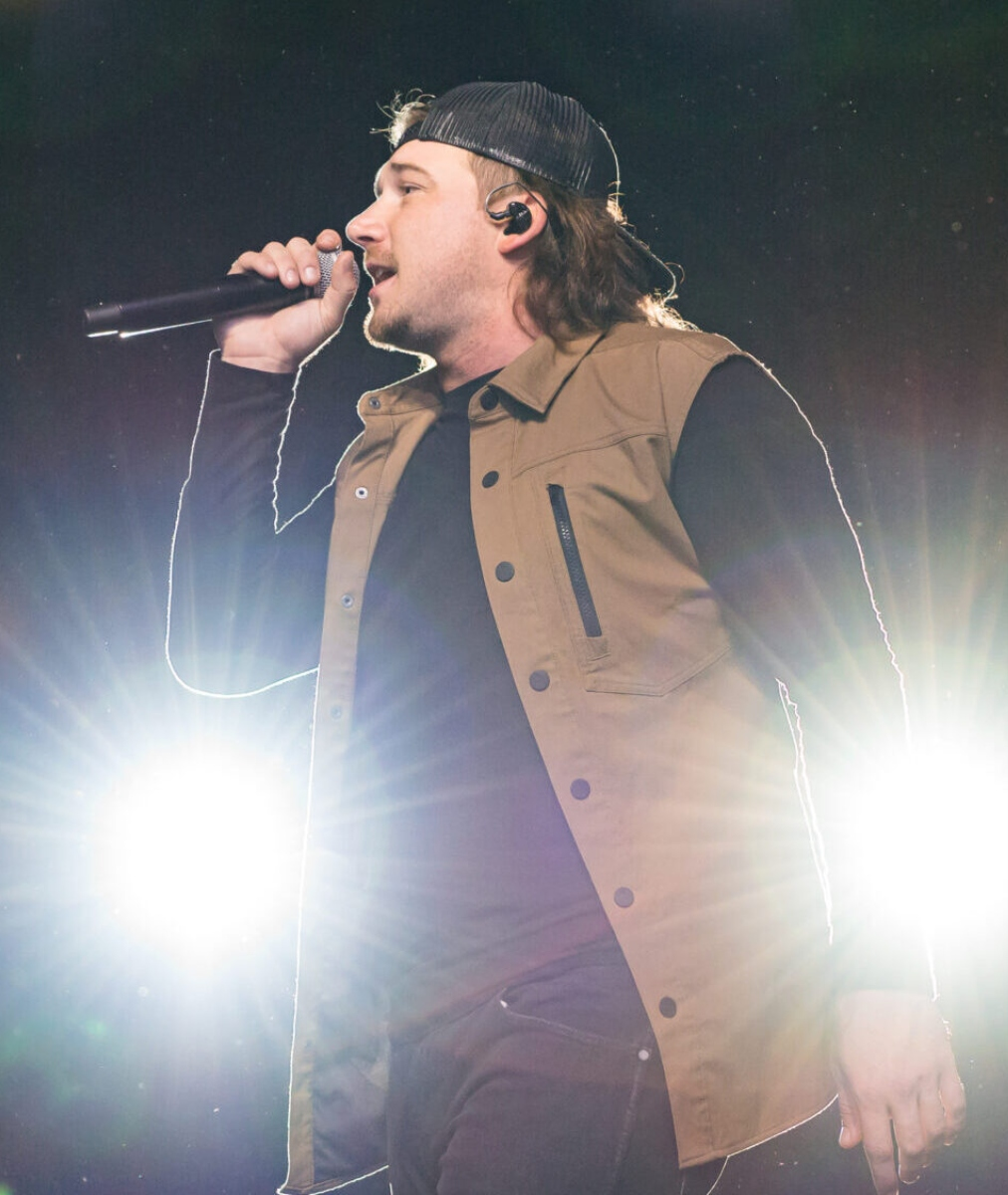
"Last Night" by Morgan Wallen came in at number one in the Year-End list. He has the most songs of any artist on the list with eight, all of which came from his third studio album One Thing at a Time.

The Billboard Hot 100 is a chart that ranks the best-performing singles of the United States. Its data, published by Billboard magazine and compiled by Nielsen SoundScan, is based collectively on each single's weekly physical and digital sales, as well as airplay and streaming. At the end of a year, Billboard will publish an annual list of the 100 most successful songs throughout that year on the Hot 100 chart based on the information. For 2023, the list was published on November 21, calculated with data from November 19, 2022, to October 21, 2023. This means, only 49 weeks, making the dates coincide with the tracking period used for the 2023 Billboard Music Awards.

== Year-end list ==
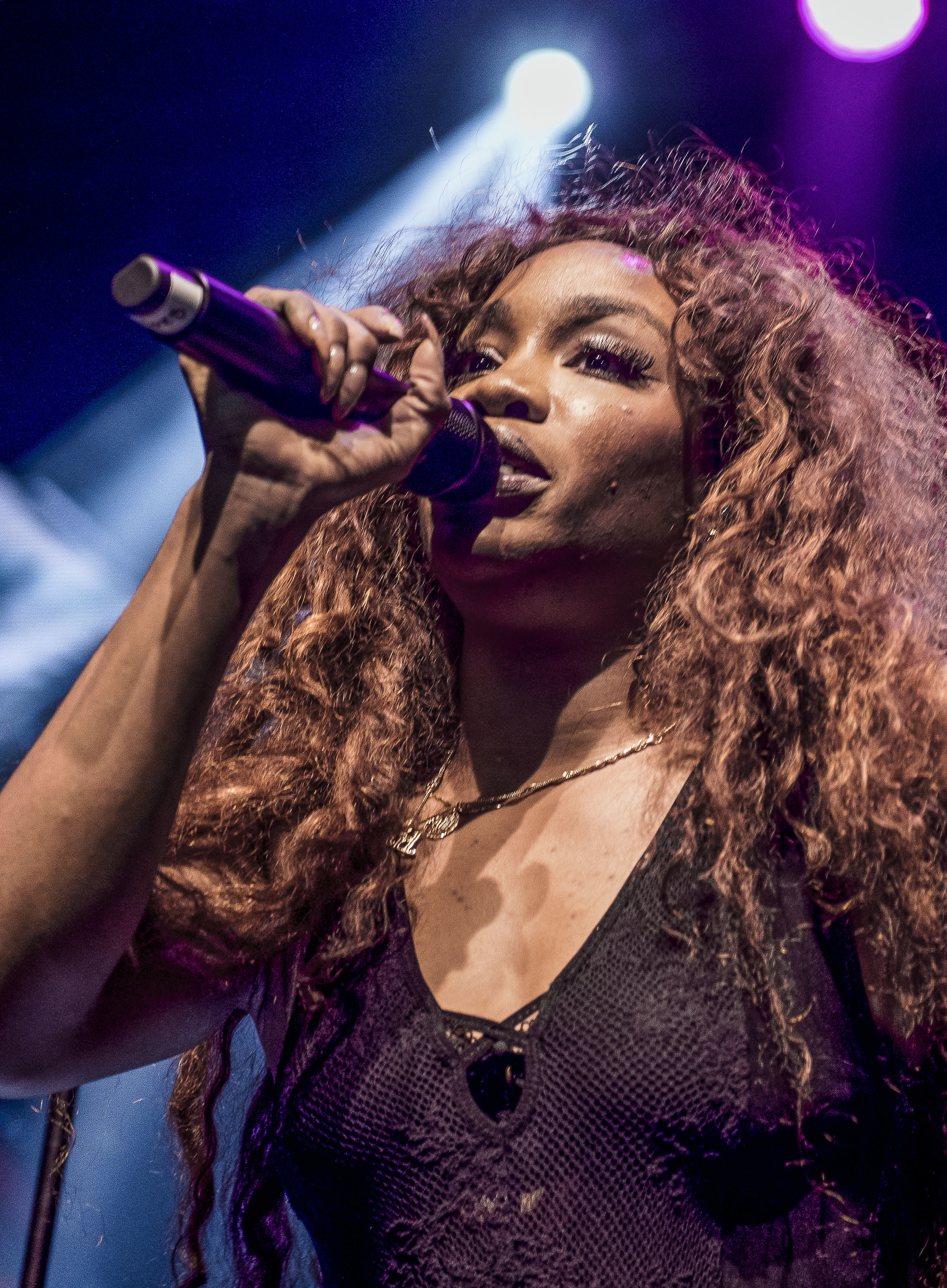
SZA has four songs on the Year-End chart, led by "Kill Bill" at number three.

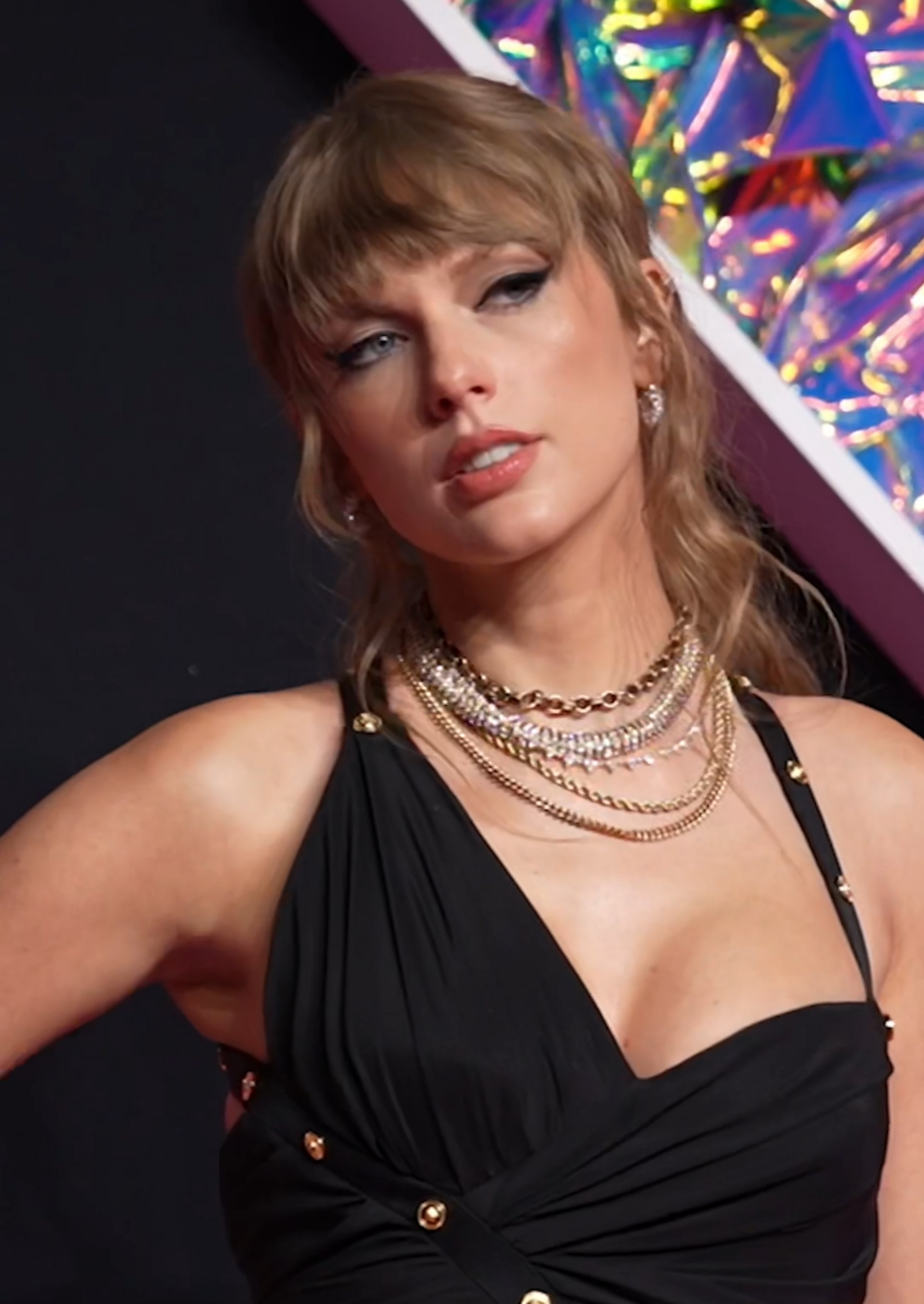
Four songs by Taylor Swift ranked within the top 40, with "Anti-Hero" at number 4.

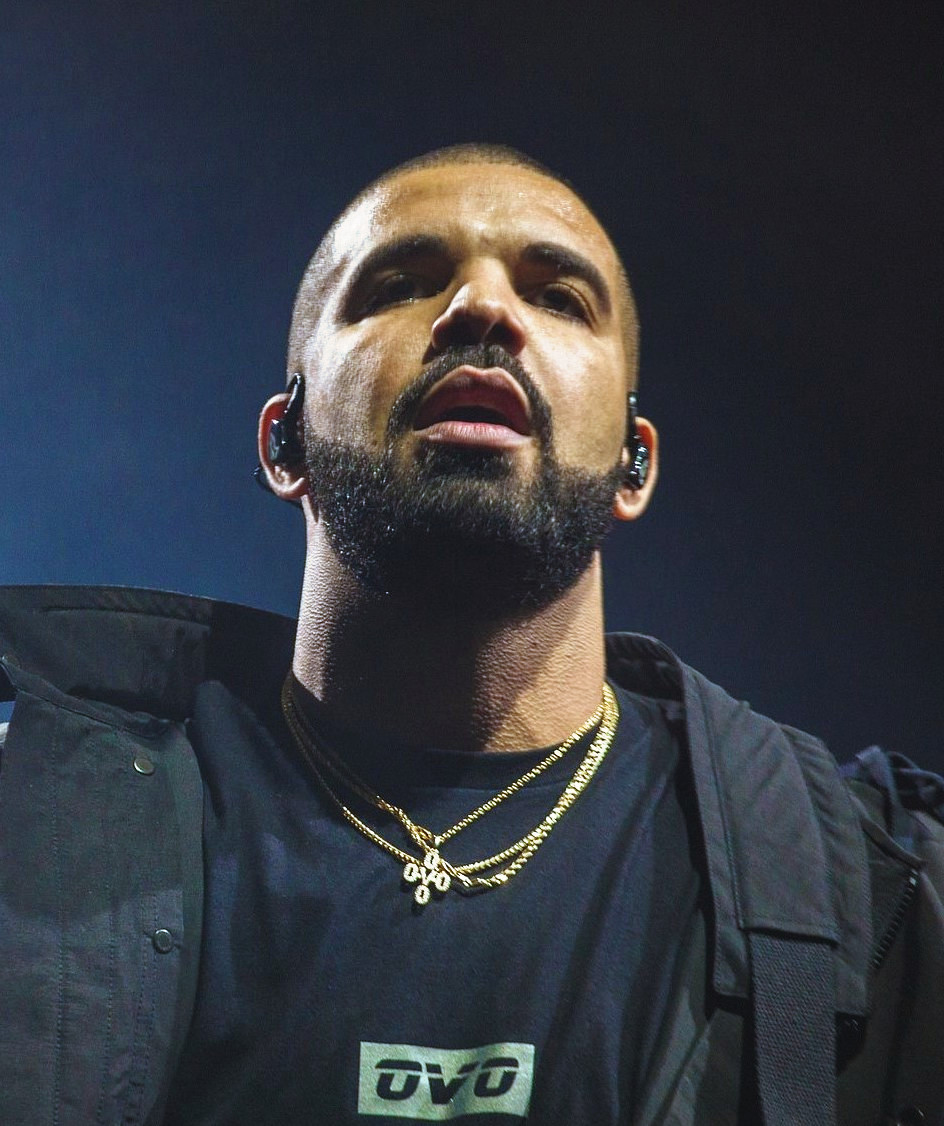
Drake has five songs on the list.

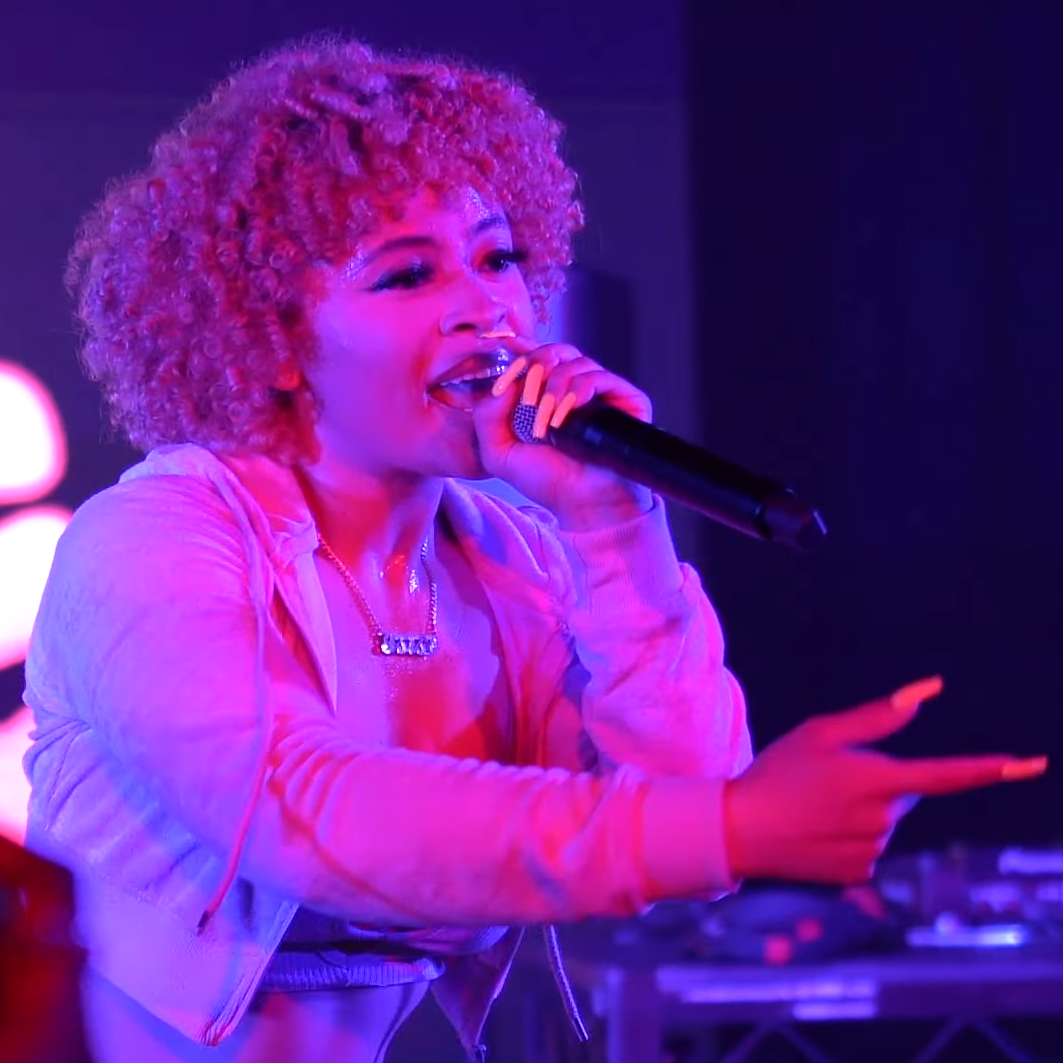
Ice Spice has four songs on the list, two of which are remixes of other artists' singles.

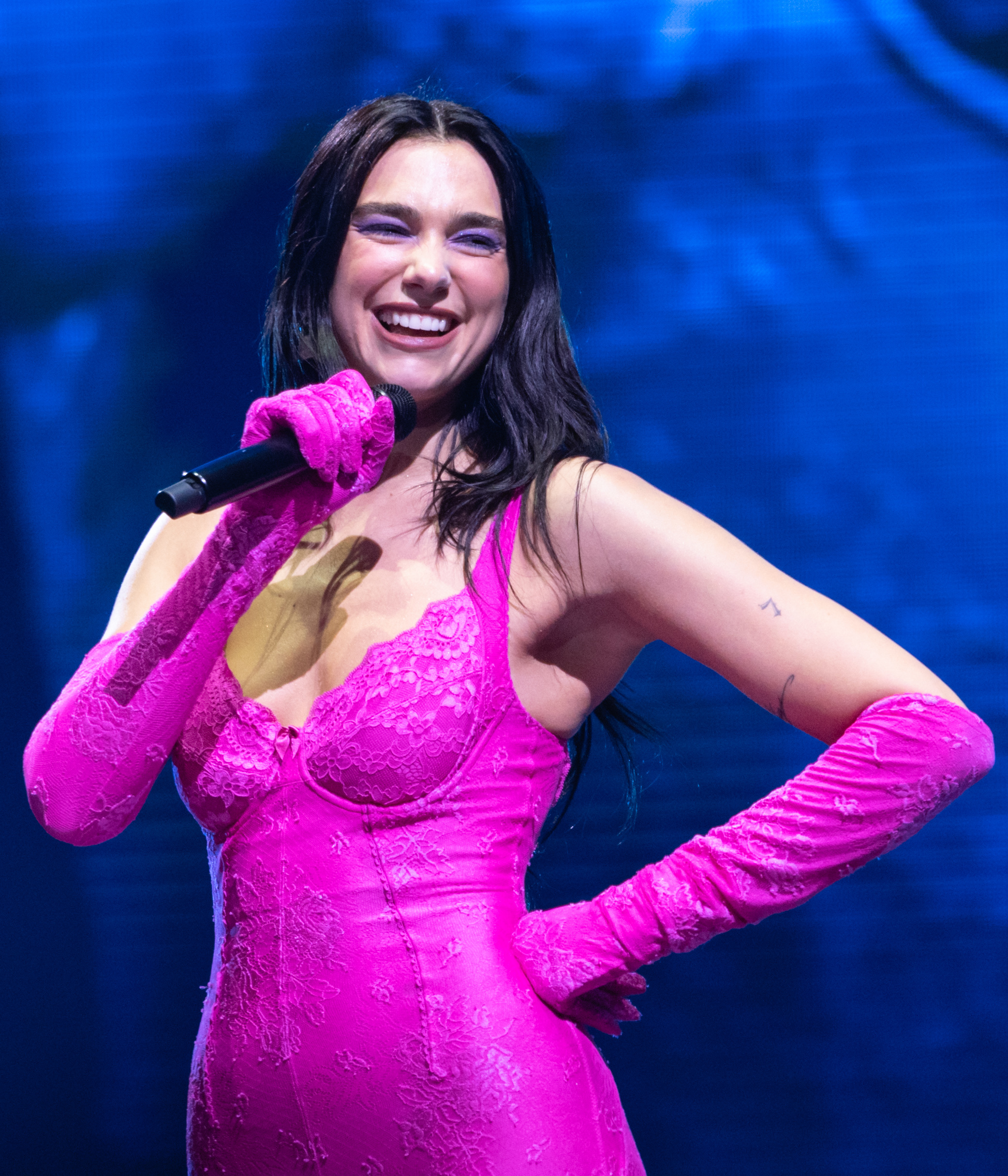
Three songs from Barbie the Album, the soundtrack album for the 2023 film Barbie, appear on the list, with "Dance the Night" by Dua Lipa (pictured) at number 35, "Barbie World" by Nicki Minaj and Ice Spice with Aqua at number 46, and "What Was I Made For?" by Billie Eilish at number 81.

List of songs on Billboard's 2023 Year-End Hot 100 chart
No.	Title	Artist(s)
1	"Last Night"	Morgan Wallen
2	"Flowers"	Miley Cyrus
3	"Kill Bill"	SZA
4	"Anti-Hero"	Taylor Swift
5	"Creepin'"	Metro Boomin, the Weeknd and 21 Savage
6	"Calm Down"	Rema and Selena Gomez
7	"Die for You"	The Weeknd and Ariana Grande
8	"Fast Car"	Luke Combs
9	"Snooze"	SZA
10	"I'm Good (Blue)"	David Guetta and Bebe Rexha
11	"Unholy"	Sam Smith and Kim Petras
12	"You Proof"	Morgan Wallen
13	"Something in the Orange"	Zach Bryan
14	"Rich Flex"	Drake and 21 Savage
15	"As It Was"	Harry Styles
16	"Rock and a Hard Place"	Bailey Zimmerman
17	"Under the Influence"	Chris Brown
18	"Cruel Summer"	Taylor Swift
19	"Thinkin' Bout Me"	Morgan Wallen
20	"Boy's a Liar Pt. 2"	PinkPantheress and Ice Spice
21	"Favorite Song"	Toosii
22	"Thought You Should Know"	Morgan Wallen
23	"Thank God"	Kane Brown and Katelyn Brown
24	"Sure Thing"	Miguel
25	"All My Life"	Lil Durk featuring J. Cole
26	"Ella Baila Sola"	Eslabon Armado and Peso Pluma
27	"Karma"	Taylor Swift featuring Ice Spice
28	"Just Wanna Rock"	Lil Uzi Vert
29	"Cuff It"	Beyoncé
30	"Vampire"	Olivia Rodrigo
31	"FukUMean"	Gunna
32	"Lavender Haze"	Taylor Swift
33	"Players"	Coi Leray
34	"Need a Favor"	Jelly Roll
35	"Dance the Night"	Dua Lipa
36	"Love You Anyway"	Luke Combs
37	"One Thing at a Time"	Morgan Wallen
38	"Superhero (Heroes & Villains)"	Metro Boomin, Future and Chris Brown
39	"Bad Habit"	Steve Lacy
40	"La Bebé"	Yng Lvcas and Peso Pluma
41	"Golden Hour"	Jvke
42	"Religiously"	Bailey Zimmerman
43	"Spin Bout U"	Drake and 21 Savage
44	"Cupid"	Fifty Fifty
45	"Search & Rescue"	Drake
46	"Barbie World"	Nicki Minaj and Ice Spice with Aqua
47	"Next Thing You Know"	Jordan Davis
48	"Escapism"	Raye featuring 070 Shake
49	"Un x100to"	Grupo Frontera and Bad Bunny
50	"Until I Found You"	Stephen Sanchez
51	"Shirt"	SZA
52	"Paint the Town Red"	Doja Cat
53	"Made You Look"	Meghan Trainor
54	"Wait in the Truck"	Hardy featuring Lainey Wilson
55	"All I Want for Christmas Is You"	Mariah Carey
56	"Everything I Love"	Morgan Wallen
57	"Chemical"	Post Malone
58	"Heart Like a Truck"	Lainey Wilson
59	"Going, Going, Gone"	Luke Combs
60	"Rockin' Around the Christmas Tree"	Brenda Lee
61	"Dancin' in the Country"	Tyler Hubbard
62	"Daylight"	David Kushner
63	"Lift Me Up"	Rihanna
64	"Eyes Closed"	Ed Sheeran
65	"TQG"	Karol G and Shakira
66	"Try That in a Small Town"	Jason Aldean
67	"Tennessee Orange"	Megan Moroney
68	"Jingle Bell Rock"	Bobby Helms
69	"Princess Diana"	Ice Spice and Nicki Minaj
70	"Tomorrow 2"	GloRilla and Cardi B
71	"A Holly Jolly Christmas"	Burl Ives
72	"Where She Goes"	Bad Bunny
73	"Bebe Dame"	Fuerza Regida and Grupo Frontera
74	"I Remember Everything"	Zach Bryan featuring Kacey Musgraves
75	"I Like You (A Happier Song)"	Post Malone featuring Doja Cat
76	"What It Is (Block Boy)"	Doechii featuring Kodak Black
77	"Nobody Gets Me"	SZA
78	"Rich Men North of Richmond"	Oliver Anthony Music
79	"Super Freaky Girl"	Nicki Minaj
80	"Dial Drunk"	Noah Kahan and Post Malone
81	"What Was I Made For?"	Billie Eilish
82	"Seven"	Jung Kook featuring Latto
83	"Wait for U"	Future featuring Drake and Tems
84	"Last Christmas"	Wham!
85	"Handle on You"	Parker McCollum
86	"Por Las Noches"	Peso Pluma
87	"Memory Lane"	Old Dominion
88	"Area Codes"	Kaliii
89	"Bury Me in Georgia"	Kane Brown
90	"PRC"	Peso Pluma and Natanael Cano
91	"What My World Spins Around"	Jordan Davis
92	"Ain't That Some"	Morgan Wallen
93	"Wild as Her"	Corey Kent
94	"Peaches & Eggplants"	Young Nudy featuring 21 Savage
95	"I Wrote the Book"	Morgan Wallen
96	"Bzrp Music Sessions, Vol. 53"	Bizarrap and Shakira
97	"Meltdown"	Travis Scott featuring Drake
98	"Put It on da Floor Again"	Latto featuring Cardi B
99	"Bloody Mary"	Lady Gaga
100	"Watermelon Moonshine"	Lainey Wilson

== See also ==
- 2023 in American music
- Billboard Year-End Hot R&B/Hip-Hop Songs of 2023
- Billboard Year-End Hot Rap Songs of 2023
- List of Billboard Hot 100 number ones of 2023
- List of Billboard Hot 100 top-ten singles in 2023
