= List of Billboard Hot 100 top-ten singles in 2023 =

This is a list of singles that charted in the top ten of the Billboard Hot 100, an all-genre singles chart in the United States, in 2023.

== Top-ten singles ==
Key

- ↑ – indicates single's top 10 entry was also its Hot 100 debut
- † – indicates Best performing song of the year
- (#) – 2023 Year-end top 10 single position and rank
- The "weeks in top ten" column reflects each song's entire chart life, not just its run during 2023.

List of Billboard Hot 100 top ten singles that peaked in 2023
Top ten entry date	Single	Artist(s)	Peak	Peak date	Weeks in top ten	Ref.
Singles from 2022
November 5	"Karma"^{[G]} ↑	Taylor Swift featuring Ice Spice^{1}	2	June 10	8	
November 26	"I'm Good (Blue)"^{[A]} (#10)	David Guetta and Bebe Rexha	4	January 14	10	
December 17	"Creepin'"^{[A]} ↑ (#5)	Metro Boomin, The Weeknd and 21 Savage	3	February 11	27	
December 24	"Kill Bill"^{[A]} ↑ (#3)	SZA	1	April 29	28	
Singles from 2023
January 14	"Die for You" (#7)	The Weeknd and Ariana Grande^{2}	1	March 11	19	
January 14	"Cuff It"^{[B]}	Beyoncé	6	February 18	5	
January 21	"Something in the Orange"	Zach Bryan	10	January 21	1	
January 28	"Flowers"^{[I]} ↑ (#2)	Miley Cyrus	1	January 28	29	
January 28	"Bzrp Music Sessions, Vol. 53" ↑	Bizarrap and Shakira	9	January 28	1	
February 4	"Golden Hour"	Jvke	10	February 4	1	
February 11	"Just Wanna Rock"	Lil Uzi Vert	10	February 11	1	
February 18	"Last Night"^{[O]}^{[Q]} † (#1)	Morgan Wallen	1	March 18	41	
February 25	"Boy's a Liar, Pt. 2"	PinkPantheress and Ice Spice	3	March 4	12	
March 11	"TQG" ↑	Karol G and Shakira	7	March 11	1	
March 18	"Thought You Should Know"	Morgan Wallen	7	March 18	2	
March 18	"Thinkin' Bout Me"^{[O]}^{[Q]} ↑	Morgan Wallen	7	November 4	5	
March 18	"One Thing at a Time"	Morgan Wallen	10	March 18	1	
March 25	"Calm Down"^{[K]}^{[M]} (#6)	Rema and Selena Gomez	3	June 17	27	
April 1	"Players"	Coi Leray	9	April 1	3	
April 1	"Rock and a Hard Place"^{[E]}	Bailey Zimmerman	10	April 1	2	
April 8	"Like Crazy" ↑	Jimin	1	April 8	1	
April 22	"Search & Rescue" ↑	Drake	2	April 22	2	
April 22	"Ella Baila Sola"	Eslabon Armado and Peso Pluma	4	May 6	11	
April 29	"Princess Diana" ↑	Ice Spice and Nicki Minaj	4	April 29	1	
May 6	"Un x100to"	Grupo Frontera and Bad Bunny	5	May 6	3	
May 20	"Favorite Song"	Toosii	5	June 3	9	
May 27	"All My Life" ↑	Lil Durk featuring J. Cole	2	May 27	10	
May 27	"Fast Car"^{[O]}^{[Q]} (#8)	Luke Combs	2	July 1	27	
June 3	"Where She Goes" ↑	Bad Bunny	8	June 3	1	
July 8	"Barbie World"^{[H]} ↑	Nicki Minaj and Ice Spice with Aqua	7	July 8	6	
July 15	"Vampire"^{[K]} ↑	Olivia Rodrigo	1	July 15	13	
July 15	"Cruel Summer"	Taylor Swift	1	October 28	34	
July 15	"Fukumean"^{[P]}	Gunna	4	August 5	15	
July 22	"I Can See You (Taylor's Version) (from the Vault)" ↑	Taylor Swift	5	July 22	1	
July 29	"Seven" ↑	Jung Kook featuring Latto	1	July 29	2	
July 29	"Try That in a Small Town" ↑	Jason Aldean	1	August 5	2	
August 5	"K-pop" ↑	Travis Scott, Bad Bunny and The Weeknd	7	August 5	1	
August 12	"Meltdown" ↑	Travis Scott featuring Drake	3	August 12	1	
August 12	"Fe!n" ↑	Travis Scott featuring Playboi Carti	5	August 12	1	
August 12	"Dance the Night"	Dua Lipa	6	September 16	9	
August 19	"Snooze"^{[J]} (#9)	SZA	2	October 7	26	
August 26	"Rich Men North of Richmond" ↑	Oliver Anthony Music	1	August 26	3	
August 26	"Bad Idea Right?"^{[L]} ↑	Olivia Rodrigo	7	September 23	2	
September 2	"Paint the Town Red"	Doja Cat	1	September 16	20	
September 9	"I Remember Everything"^{[O]}^{[Q]} ↑	Zach Bryan featuring Kacey Musgraves	1	September 9	23	
September 9	"Used to Be Young" ↑	Miley Cyrus	8	September 9	1	
September 30	"Slime You Out"^{[N]} ↑	Drake featuring SZA	1	September 30	2	
October 14	"3D" ↑	Jung Kook and Jack Harlow	5	October 14	1	
October 21	"First Person Shooter" ↑	Drake featuring J. Cole	1	October 21	2	
October 21	"IDGAF" ↑	Drake featuring Yeat	2	October 21	3	
October 21	"Virginia Beach" ↑	Drake	3	October 21	1	
October 21	"Calling for You" ↑	Drake featuring 21 Savage	5	October 21	1	
October 21	"Daylight" ↑	Drake	8	October 21	1	
October 21	"Fear of Heights" ↑	Drake	10	October 21	1	
October 28	"Monaco" ↑	Bad Bunny	5	October 28	2	
November 11	"Is It Over Now? (Taylor's Version) (from the Vault)" ↑	Taylor Swift	1	November 11	4	
November 11	"Now That We Don't Talk (Taylor's Version) (from the Vault)" ↑	Taylor Swift	2	November 11	1	
November 11	"Slut! (Taylor's Version) (from the Vault)" ↑	Taylor Swift	3	November 11	1	
November 11	"Say Don't Go (Taylor's Version) (from the Vault)" ↑	Taylor Swift	5	November 11	1	
November 11	"Bad Blood (Taylor's Version)" ↑	Taylor Swift	7	November 11	1	
November 11	"Style (Taylor's Version)" ↑	Taylor Swift	9	November 11	1	
November 11	"Suburban Legends (Taylor's Version) (from the Vault)" ↑	Taylor Swift	10	November 11	1	
November 18	"Standing Next to You" ↑	Jung Kook	5	November 18	1	
November 18	"Now and Then" ↑	The Beatles	7	November 18	1	
November 25	"Lovin on Me" ↑	Jack Harlow	1	December 2	23	

=== 2022 peaks ===
List of Billboard Hot 100 top ten singles in 2023 that peaked in 2022
Top ten entry date	Single	Artist(s)	Peak	Peak date	Weeks in top ten	Ref.
April 16	"As It Was"^{[A]} ↑	Harry Styles	1	April 16	38	
May 28	"You Proof"^{[C]} ↑	Morgan Wallen	5	October 22	10	
August 13	"Bad Habit"^{[A]}	Steve Lacy	1	October 8	18	
October 8	"Unholy" ↑	Sam Smith and Kim Petras	1	October 29	22	
November 5	"Anti-Hero"^{[D]}^{[F]} ↑(#4)	Taylor Swift	1	November 5	28	
November 19	"Rich Flex"^{[A]} ↑	Drake and 21 Savage	2	November 19	10	

=== 2024 peaks ===
List of Billboard Hot 100 top ten singles in 2023 that peaked in 2024
Top ten entry date	Single	Artist(s)	Peak	Peak date	Weeks in top ten	Ref.
November 25	"Greedy"^{[T]}	Tate McRae	3	January 13	15	
December 2	"Water"	Tyla	7	January 13	3	

=== Holiday season ===
Holiday titles first making the Billboard Hot 100 top ten during the 2022–23 holiday season
Top ten entry date	Single	Artist(s)	Peak	Peak date	Weeks in top ten	Ref.
January 7, 2023	"The Christmas Song (Merry Christmas to You)"	Nat King Cole	6	December 27, 2025	6	

Recurring holiday titles, appearing in the Billboard Hot 100 top ten in previous holiday seasons
Top ten entry date	Single	Artist(s)	Peak	Peak date	Weeks in top ten	Ref.
December 30, 2017	"All I Want for Christmas Is You"^{[R]}	Mariah Carey	1	December 21, 2019	43	
December 29, 2018	"It's the Most Wonderful Time of the Year"^{[S]}	Andy Williams	5	January 2, 2021	24	
January 5, 2019	"Rockin' Around the Christmas Tree"^{[R]}	Brenda Lee	1	December 9, 2023	35	
January 5, 2019	"Jingle Bell Rock"^{[S]}	Bobby Helms	2	December 27, 2025	32	
January 5, 2019	"A Holly Jolly Christmas"^{[S]}	Burl Ives	4	January 4, 2020	26	
December 19, 2020	"Feliz Navidad"^{[U]}	José Feliciano	6	January 2, 2021	9	
January 2, 2021	"Let It Snow, Let It Snow, Let It Snow"^{[T]}	Dean Martin	7	January 6, 2024	8	
January 2, 2021	"Last Christmas"^{[S]}	Wham!	2	December 13, 2025	22	
January 1, 2022	"Sleigh Ride"^{[T]}	The Ronettes	8	December 23, 2023	5	

=== Notes ===
^{1} Taylor Swift was the sole artist credited on "Karma" when it debuted on November 5, 2022, for its only week in the top ten prior to its return on June 10, 2023. A remix featuring Ice Spice brought the song back to the top ten, and Ice Spice is credited on the song as of June 10, 2023.
^{2} Prior to the chart dated March 11, 2023, "Die for You" was credited to The Weeknd only.

^{A} The single re-entered the top ten on the week ending January 14, 2023.
^{B} The single re-entered the top ten on the week ending February 18, 2023.
^{C} The single re-entered the top ten on the week ending March 18, 2023.
^{D} The single re-entered the top ten on the week ending March 25, 2023.
^{E} The single re-entered the top ten on the week ending April 15, 2023.
^{F} The single re-entered the top ten on the week ending May 6, 2023.
^{G} The single re-entered the top ten on the week ending June 10, 2023.
^{H} The single re-entered the top ten on the week ending August 5, 2023.
^{I} The single re-entered the top ten on the week ending August 19, 2023.
^{J} The single re-entered the top ten on the week ending September 9, 2023.
^{K} The single re-entered the top ten on the week ending September 16, 2023.
^{L} The single re-entered the top ten on the week ending September 23, 2023.
^{M} The single re-entered the top ten on the week ending October 7, 2023.
^{N} The single re-entered the top ten on the week ending October 21, 2023.
^{O} The single re-entered the top ten on the week ending October 28, 2023.
^{P} The single re-entered the top ten on the week ending November 4, 2023.
^{Q} The single re-entered the top ten on the week ending November 18, 2023.
^{R} The single re-entered the top ten on the week ending December 2, 2023.
^{S} The single re-entered the top ten on the week ending December 9, 2023.
^{T} The single re-entered the top ten on the week ending December 23, 2023.
^{U} The single re-entered the top ten on the week ending December 30, 2023.

== Artists with most top-ten songs ==
List of artists by total songs peaking in the top-ten
Artist	Numbers of songs
Taylor Swift	11
Drake	10
Morgan Wallen	5
Bad Bunny	4
Ice Spice	4
Jung Kook	3
SZA	3
Travis Scott	3
The Weeknd	3
21 Savage	3
J. Cole	2
Jack Harlow	2
Miley Cyrus	2
Nicki Minaj	2
Shakira	2
Zach Bryan	2

== See also ==
- 2023 in American music
- List of Billboard Hot 100 number ones of 2023
- Billboard Year-End Hot 100 singles of 2023
