= 2023 Billboard Music Awards =

Annual American music awards ceremony

- Date: November 19, 2023
- Presented by: Marriott Bonvoy
- Most awards: Morgan Wallen (11)
- Most nominations: Taylor Swift (20)
- Website: bbmas.watch

Television/radio coverage
- Network: billboard.com
- Produced by: Dick Clark Productions

The 2023 Billboard Music Awards were held on November 19, 2023. The show aired live on Billboard's website and social media pages. Nominations across 71 categories—for releases during the period dated to November 19, 2022, through October 21, 2023—were announced online on October 26, 2023. Taylor Swift received the most nominations of any artist, with 20. Morgan Wallen was awarded the most honors of the night, with 11 wins followed by Swift who won 10 awards.

== Background ==
On March 16, 2023, Billboard announced the shift of the award ceremony from spring to fall 2023, as of before the 2011 Billboard Music Awards. The show was announced to be held on November 19, 2023, typically dates held by the American Music Awards, which was cancelled for the year of 2023.

On October 19, 2023, Billboard announced a partnership with Spotify for the award ceremony, for a segment named "Fans First" to "bring fans up-close-and-personal with their favorite artists". Billboard also announced, that the event will be aired online for the first time, across BBMAs, Billboard social channels and BBMAs.watch on the same day. Performances and award celebrations will take place in global locations, in the midst of sold-out tours and in custom venues.

== Performers ==
Performer(s)	Song(s)	Ref.
Karol G	"Qlona" "Labios Mordidos" "Ojos Ferrari"	
David Guetta Bebe Rexha	"I'm Good (Blue)" "One in a Million"	
NewJeans	"Super Shy" "OMG"	
Tate McRae	"Greedy"	
Peso Pluma	"Rubicon"	
Mariah Carey	"All I Want for Christmas Is You"	
Stray Kids	"S-Class" "Lalalala"	
Morgan Wallen	"98 Braves"	

== Winners and nominees ==
Below is the list of winners and nominees. Winners are listed first and highlighted in bold.

Top Artist	Top New Artist	Top Male Artist
**Taylor Swift**; Luke Combs; Drake; SZA; Morgan Wallen	**Zach Bryan**; Ice Spice; Jelly Roll; Peso Pluma; Bailey Zimmerman	**Morgan Wallen**; Zach Bryan; Luke Combs; Drake; The Weeknd
Top Female Artist	Top Duo/Group	Top Billboard 200 Artist
**Taylor Swift**; Beyoncé; Miley Cyrus; Olivia Rodrigo; SZA	**Fuerza Regida**; Eslabon Armado; Fifty Fifty; Grupo Frontera; Metallica	**Taylor Swift**; Luke Combs; Drake; SZA; Morgan Wallen
Top Hot 100 Artist	Top Hot 100 Songwriter	Top Hot 100 Producer
**Morgan Wallen**; Luke Combs; Drake; Taylor Swift; SZA	**Taylor Swift**; Jack Antonoff; Zach Bryan; Ashley Gorley; SZA	**Joey Moi**; Jack Antonoff; Zach Bryan; Metro Boomin; Taylor Swift
Top Streaming Songs Artist	Top Radio Songs Artist	Top Song Sales Artist
**Morgan Wallen**; Zach Bryan; Drake; Taylor Swift; SZA	**Taylor Swift**; Miley Cyrus; SZA; Morgan Wallen; The Weeknd	**Taylor Swift**; Jason Aldean; Oliver Anthony Music; Miley Cyrus; Morgan Wallen
Top Billboard Global 200 Artist	Top Billboard Global (Excl. U.S.) Artist	Top R&B Artist
**Taylor Swift**; Bad Bunny; SZA; Morgan Wallen; The Weeknd	**Taylor Swift**; Bad Bunny; NewJeans; Ed Sheeran; The Weeknd	**SZA**; Beyoncé; Chris Brown; Rihanna; The Weeknd
Top R&B Male Artist	Top R&B Female Artist	Top R&B Touring Artist
**The Weeknd**; Chris Brown; Miguel	**SZA**; Beyoncé; Rihanna	**Beyoncé**; Bruno Mars; The Weeknd
Top Rap Artist	Top Rap Male Artist	Top Rap Female Artist
**Drake**; 21 Savage; Lil Baby; Metro Boomin; Travis Scott	**Drake**; 21 Savage; Travis Scott	**Nicki Minaj**; Doja Cat; Ice Spice
Top Rap Touring Artist	Top Country Artist	Top Country Male Artist
**Drake**; 50 Cent; Snoop Dogg and Wiz Khalifa	**Morgan Wallen**; Zach Bryan; Luke Combs; Taylor Swift; Bailey Zimmerman	**Morgan Wallen**; Zach Bryan; Luke Combs
Top Country Female Artist	Top Country Duo/Group	Top Country Touring Artist
**Taylor Swift**; Megan Moroney; Lainey Wilson	**Zac Brown Band**; Old Dominion; Parmalee	**Morgan Wallen**; Luke Combs; George Strait
Top Rock Artist	Top Rock Duo/Group	Top Rock Touring Artist
**Zach Bryan**; Jelly Roll; Noah Kahan; Steve Lacy; Stephen Sanchez	**Arctic Monkeys**; Foo Fighters; Metallica	**Coldplay**; Depeche Mode; Elton John
Top Latin Artist	Top Latin Male Artist	Top Latin Female Artist
**Bad Bunny**; Eslabon Armado; Karol G; Peso Pluma; Fuerza Regida	**Bad Bunny**; Rauw Alejandro; Peso Pluma	**Karol G**; Rosalía; Shakira
Top Latin Duo/Group	Top Latin Touring Artist	Top Global K-Pop Artist
**Fuerza Regida**; Eslabon Armado; Grupo Frontera	**Karol G**; Daddy Yankee; RBD	**NewJeans**; Jimin; Stray Kids; Tomorrow X Together; Twice
Top K-Pop Touring Artist	Top Afrobeats Artist	Top Dance/Electronic Artist
**Blackpink**; Suga; Twice	**Burna Boy**; Libianca; Rema; Tems; Wizkid	**Beyoncé**; Drake; David Guetta; Calvin Harris; Tiësto
Top Christian Artist	Top Gospel Artist	Top Billboard 200 Album
**Lauren Daigle**; Elevation Worship; For King & Country; Brandon Lake; Phil Wickham	**Kanye West**; Elevation Worship; Maverick City Music; Kirk Franklin; CeCe Winans	**Morgan Wallen – One Thing at a Time**; Drake and 21 Savage – Her Loss; Metro Boomin – Heroes & Villains; Taylor Swift – Midnights; SZA – SOS
Top Soundtrack	Top R&B Album	Top Rap Album
**Barbie the Album**; Black Panther: Wakanda Forever; Elvis; Spider-Man: Across the Spider-Verse; Top Gun: Maverick	**SZA – SOS**; Beyoncé – Renaissance; Brent Faiyaz – Wasteland; Drake – Honestly, Nevermind; Steve Lacy – Gemini Rights	**Drake and 21 Savage – Her Loss**; Future – I Never Liked You; Lil Baby – It's Only Me; Metro Boomin – Heroes & Villains; Travis Scott – Utopia
Top Country Album	Top Rock Album	Top Latin Album
**Morgan Wallen – One Thing at a Time**; Zach Bryan – American Heartbreak; Luke Combs – Gettin' Old; Luke Combs – Growin' Up; Taylor Swift – Speak Now (Taylor's Version)	**Zach Bryan – American Heartbreak**; Hardy – The Mockingbird & the Crow; Jelly Roll – Whitsitt Chapel; Noah Kahan – Stick Season; Steve Lacy – Gemini Rights	**Bad Bunny – Un Verano Sin Ti**; Eslabon Armado – Desvelado; Iván Cornejo – Dañado; Karol G – Mañana Será Bonito; Peso Pluma – Génesis
Top K-Pop Album	Top Dance/Electronic Album	Top Christian Album
**Stray Kids – 5-Star**; Jimin – Face; NewJeans – Get Up; Tomorrow X Together – The Name Chapter: Temptation; Twice – Ready to Be	**Beyoncé – Renaissance**; Drake – Honestly, Nevermind; Illenium – Illenium; Kim Petras – Feed The Beast; Tiësto – Drive	**Anne Wilson – My Jesus**; Cain – Rise Up; Lauren Daigle – Lauren Daigle; Elevation Worship – Lion; Brandon Lake – House of Miracles
Top Gospel Album	Top Hot 100 Song	Top Streaming Song
**Maverick City Music and Kirk Franklin – Kingdom Book One**; Zacardi Cortez – Imprint (Live in Memphis); Whitney Houston – I Go to the Rock: The Gospel Music of Whitney Houston; Jonathan McReynolds – My Truth; Tye Tribbett – All Things New	**Morgan Wallen – "Last Night"**; Miley Cyrus – "Flowers"; Metro Boomin, The Weeknd and 21 Savage – "Creepin'"; Taylor Swift – "Anti-Hero"; SZA – "Kill Bill"	**Morgan Wallen – "Last Night"**; Zach Bryan – "Something in the Orange"; Miley Cyrus – "Flowers"; Taylor Swift – "Anti-Hero"; SZA – "Kill Bill"
Top Radio Song	Top Selling Song	Top Collaboration
**Miley Cyrus – "Flowers"**; Metro Boomin, The Weeknd and 21 Savage – "Creepin'"; Rema and Selena Gomez – "Calm Down"; Taylor Swift – "Anti-Hero"; The Weeknd and Ariana Grande – "Die for You"	**Taylor Swift – "Anti-Hero"**; Jason Aldean – "Try That in a Small Town"; Oliver Anthony Music – "Rich Men North of Richmond"; Miley Cyrus – "Flowers"; Jimin - "Like Crazy"	**Metro Boomin, The Weeknd and 21 Savage – "Creepin'"**; David Guetta and Bebe Rexha – "I'm Good (Blue)"; Rema and Selena Gomez – "Calm Down"; Sam Smith and Kim Petras – "Unholy"; The Weeknd and Ariana Grande – "Die for You"
Top Billboard Global 200 Song	Top Billboard Global (Excl. U.S.) Song	Top R&B Song
**Miley Cyrus – "Flowers"**; Rema and Selena Gomez – "Calm Down"; Taylor Swift – "Anti-Hero"; SZA – "Kill Bill"; The Weeknd and Ariana Grande – "Die for You"	**Miley Cyrus – "Flowers"**; David Guetta and Bebe Rexha – "I'm Good (Blue)"; Rema and Selena Gomez – "Calm Down"; Harry Styles – "As It Was"; The Weeknd and Ariana Grande – "Die for You"	**SZA – "Kill Bill"**; Metro Boomin, The Weeknd and 21 Savage – "Creepin'"; Miguel – "Sure Thing"; SZA – "Snooze"; The Weeknd and Ariana Grande – "Die for You"
Top Rap Song	Top Country Song	Top Rock Song
**Drake and 21 Savage – "Rich Flex"**; Coi Leray – "Players"; Gunna – "FukUMean"; Lil Durk featuring J. Cole – "All My Life"; Toosii – "Favorite Song"	**Morgan Wallen – "Last Night"**; Zach Bryan – "Something in the Orange"; Luke Combs – "Fast Car"; Morgan Wallen – "You Proof"; Bailey Zimmerman – "Rock and a Hard Place"	**Zach Bryan – "Something in the Orange"**; Zach Bryan featuring Kacey Musgraves – "I Remember Everything"; Jelly Roll – "Need a Favor"; Steve Lacy – "Bad Habit"; Stephen Sanchez – "Until I Found You"
Top Latin Song	Top Global K-Pop Song	Top Afrobeats Song
**Eslabon Armado and Peso Pluma – "Ella Baila Sola"**; Fuerza Regida and Grupo Frontera – "Bebe Dame"; Grupo Frontera and Bad Bunny – "Un x100to"; Karol G and Shakira – "TQG"; Yng Lvcas and Peso Pluma – "La Bebé"	**Jungkook featuring Latto – "Seven"**; Fifty Fifty – "Cupid"; Jimin – "Like Crazy"; NewJeans – "Ditto"; NewJeans – "OMG"	**Rema and Selena Gomez – "Calm Down"**; Ayra Starr – "Rush"; Libianca – "People"; Oxlade – "Ku Lo Sa"; Victony, Rema and Tempoe featuring Don Toliver – "Soweto"
Top Dance/Electronic Song	Top Christian Song	Top Gospel Song
**David Guetta and Bebe Rexha – "I'm Good (Blue)"**; Bizarrap and Shakira – "Shakira: Bzrp Music Sessions, Vol. 53"; David Guetta, Anne-Marie and Coi Leray – "Baby Don't Hurt Me"; Elton John and Britney Spears – "Hold Me Closer"; Tiësto featuring Tate McRae – "10:35"	**Brandon Lake – "Gratitude"**; Lauren Daigle – "Thank God I Do"; For King & Country and Jordin Sparks – "Love Me Like I Am"; Chris Tomlin – "Holy Forever"; Phil Wickham – "This Is Our God"	**CeCe Winans – "Goodness of God"**; Zacardi Cortez – "Lord Do It For Me (Live in Memphis)"; Crowder and Dante Bowe featuring Maverick City Music – "God Really Loves Us"; Elevation Worship featuring Chandler Moore and Tiffany Hudson – "More Than Able"; Maverick City Music and Kirk Franklin featuring Brandon Lake and Chandler Moore – "Fear Is Not My Future"
