= Devil Don't Know =

Song by Morgan Wallen

from the album One Thing at a Time
- Released: March 3, 2023
- Genre: Country
- Length: 3:24
- Label: Big Loud; Republic; Mercury
- Songwriters: Travis Denning; Ben Stennis; Jared Mullins
- Producer: Joey Moi

Lyric video
- "Devil Don't Know" on YouTube

"Devil Don't Know" is a song by American country music singer Morgan Wallen, released on March 3, 2023 from his third studio album One Thing at a Time. The song is the fifth track off the album, and was written by Travis Denning, Ben Stennis, and Jared Mullins. It debuted at number 29 on the US Billboard Hot 100 chart, where it remained on the chart for three weeks.

== Lyrics and composition ==
The song, written by Travis Denning, Ben Stennis, and Jared Mullins, is about a pair of lovers who have gone through a breakup. Wallen tells the story of the male side of the story and how he tries to drown his sorrows: "There's a bottle on a King James coaster / Miller Lite full of cigarettes / Too drunk to be hungover / Last night still on my breath", but is too heartbroken to even experience a hangover: "I've been tryin' to drown these demons / Aw, but damn if they don't swim". The song also contains numerous Bible references such as the King James Version of the Bible, the book of Revelation, the chorus and song title of "Even the devil don't know this kinda Hell", and the line "And no I can't tell you where Heaven is / But I know right where it isn't". "Devil Don't Know" joins several other songs on One Thing at a Time to contain Bible references, as Wallen's Christian beliefs are shown in other songs like "Thought You Should Know", "In the Bible", and "I Wrote the Book", especially.

== Critical reception ==
Billy Dukes of Taste of Country ranked the song at number twenty-seven on their list of One Thing at a Time's best songs, one of the lower songs out of the thirty-six song tracklist. Dukes says that the song has a standout lyric of "I've been tryin' to drown these demons / Aw, but damn if they don't swim". He also claims that the song's numerous Bible references may be too much for some Wallen fans, although most will appreciate them.

== Commercial performance ==
"Devil Don't Know" debuted at number 29 on the US Billboard Hot 100 chart. The song then remained on the chart for the following two weeks before falling off the chart after a total of three weeks present. It also debuted at 61 on the Billboard Global 200, along with the rest of One Thing at a Time.

== Charts ==
=== Weekly charts ===
Weekly Chart performance for "Devil Don't Know"
Chart (2023)	Peak position
Canada Hot 100 (Billboard)	28
Global 200 (Billboard)	61
US Billboard Hot 100	29
US Hot Country Songs (Billboard)	13

=== Year-end charts ===
Year-end chart performance for "Devil Don't Know"
Chart (2023)	Position
US Hot Country Songs (Billboard)	93
