= Billboard Year-End Hot Rap Songs of 2023 =

American music chart

This is a list of Billboard magazine's Top Hot Rap Songs of 2023.

No.	Title	Artist(s)
1	"Rich Flex"	Drake and 21 Savage
2	"Favorite Song"	Toosii
3	"All My Life"	Lil Durk featuring J. Cole
4	"FukUMean"	Gunna
5	"Players"	Coi Leray
6	"Just Wanna Rock"	Lil Uzi Vert
7	"Superhero (Heroes & Villains)"	Metro Boomin, Future and Chris Brown
8	"Search & Rescue"	Drake
9	"Barbie World"	Nicki Minaj and Ice Spice with Aqua
10	"Spin Bout U"	Drake and 21 Savage
11	"Paint the Town Red"	Doja Cat
12	"Tomorrow 2"	GloRilla and Cardi B
13	"Princess Diana"	Ice Spice and Nicki Minaj
14	"Super Freaky Girl"	Nicki Minaj
15	"Vegas"	Doja Cat
16	"Area Codes"	Kali
17	"Meltdown"	Travis Scott featuring Drake
18	"Put It on da Floor"	Latto and Cardi B
19	"Peaches & Eggplants"	Young Nudy featuring 21 Savage
20	"Slut Me Out"	NLE Choppa
21	"Fight the Feeling"	Rod Wave
22	"Circo Loco"	Drake and 21 Savage
23	"On BS"	Drake and 21 Savage
24	"I Know?"	Travis Scott
25	"Pussy & Millions"	Drake and 21 Savage featuring Travis Scott
26	"Trance"	Metro Boomin, Travis Scott and Young Thug
27	"Major Distribution"	Drake and 21 Savage
28	"Stand by Me"	Lil Durk featuring Morgan Wallen
29	"Freestyle"	Lil Baby
30	"Too Many Nights"	Metro Boomin and Future featuring Don Toliver
31	"Paiting Pictures"	Superstar Pride
32	"In Ha Mood"	Ice Spice
33	"Red Ruby da Sleeze"	Nicki Minaj
34	"Shake Sumn"	DaBaby
35	"K-POP"	Travis Scott, Bad Bunny and the Weeknd
36	"Telekinesis"	Travis Scott featuring SZA and Future
37	"Forever"	Lil Baby featuring Fridayy
38	"Oh U Went"	Young Thug featuring Drake
39	"Low Down"	Lil Baby
40	"Watch This" (ArizonaTears Pluggnb Remix)	Lil Uzi Vert and ArizonaTears
41	"FE!N"	Travis Scott
42	"California Breeze"	Lil Baby
43	"Privileged Rappers"	Drake and 21 Savage
44	"Heyy"	Lil Baby
45	"Deli"	Ice Spice
46	"BackOutsideBoyz"	Drake
47	"Jimmy Cooks"	Drake featuring 21 Savage
48	"Private Landing"	Don Toliver featuring Justin Bieber and Future
49	"Don't Play with It"	Lola Brooke, Latto and Yung Miami or featuring Billy B
50	"Niagara Falls (Foot or 2)"	Metro Boomin, Travis Scott and 21 Savage

== See also ==
- 2023 in music
- Billboard Year-End Hot 100 singles of 2023
- Billboard Year-End Hot R&B/Hip-Hop Songs of 2023
