= Thought You Should Know =

Thought You Should Know may refer to:

- "Thought You Should Know" (Keyshia Cole song)
- "Thought You Should Know" (Morgan Wallen song)

== See also ==
- You Should Know
