= Cowgirls (song) =

2024 single by Morgan Wallen

Single by Morgan Wallen featuring Ernest

from the album One Thing at a Time
- Released: April 15, 2024
- Genre: Country pop; hick-hop; pop
- Length: 3:01
- Label: Big Loud; Republic; Mercury
- Songwriters: Rocky Block; Ashley Gorley; James Maddocks; Ernest Keith Smith; Ryan Vojtesak
- Producers: Joey Moi; Jacob Durrett

Morgan Wallen singles chronology
"Man Made a Bar" (2023)	"Cowgirls" (2024)	"I Had Some Help" (2024)

Ernest singles chronology
"Flower Shops" (2022)	"Cowgirls" (2024)	"Would If I Could" (2024)

Lyric video
- "Cowgirls" on YouTube

"Cowgirls" is a song by American country music singer Morgan Wallen featuring singer Ernest. It was released on April 15, 2024, as the eighth single from Wallen's third studio album One Thing at a Time. It was written by Rocky Block, Ashley Gorley, James Maddocks, Ernest Keith Smith and Ryan Vojtesak, and produced by Joey Moi and Jacob Durrett.

== Content ==
Substream Magazine writer Logan White referred to the song as "the perfect blend of country and hip-hop that Wallen has really been experimenting with these last couple years".

== Commercial performance ==
"Cowgirls" debuted at number 40 on the Billboard Hot 100 on the chart dated March 18, 2023. The song then remained on the chart for 20 weeks before falling off on the chart. Following its release to radio as an official single, the song re-entered the Billboard Hot 100 at number 42 and peaked at number 12.

On the Billboard Country Airplay chart, for the week of July 6, 2024, "Cowgirls" reached the number two position on the Country Airplay chart while Post Malone's "I Had Some Help" – on which Wallen is a featured artist – notched a second week at number one, making Wallen the third artist in the chart's history to hold the top two positions concurrently. "Cowgirls" reached number one dated July 27, 2024, replacing "I Had Some Help", making it the first time that an act has displaced themselves at number one since 2002 when Tim McGraw achieved back-to-back number one singles, first as a featured artist on Jo Dee Messina's "Bring On the Rain" and then with his own "The Cowboy in Me", and only the second time in the chart's history. It is Wallen's fourteenth number one single, and Ernest's first.

== Chart performance ==
=== Weekly charts ===
Weekly chart performance for "Cowgirls"
Chart (2023–2024)	Peak position
Canada Hot 100 (Billboard)	21
Canada Country (Billboard)	1
Global 200 (Billboard)	47
Ireland (IRMA)	79
UK Singles (Official Charts)	92
US Billboard Hot 100	12
US Country Airplay (Billboard)	1
US Hot Country Songs (Billboard)	3
US Pop Airplay (Billboard)	38

=== Year-end charts ===
2023 year-end chart performance for "Cowgirls"
Chart (2023)	Position
Canada (Canadian Hot 100)	99
US Hot Country Songs (Billboard)	23

2024 year-end chart performance for "Cowgirls"
Chart (2024)	Position
Canada (Canadian Hot 100)	36
Canada Country (Billboard)	94
Global 200 (Billboard)	168
US Billboard Hot 100	29
US Country Airplay (Billboard)	6
US Hot Country Songs (Billboard)	8

== Certifications ==
Certifications for "Cowgirls"
Region	Certification	Certified units/sales
Australia (ARIA)	Platinum	70,000^{‡}
Canada (Music Canada)	7× Platinum	560,000^{‡}
New Zealand (RMNZ)	2× Platinum	60,000^{‡}
United Kingdom (BPI)	Gold	400,000^{‡}
United States (RIAA)	6× Platinum	6,000,000^{‡}
^{‡} Sales+streaming figures based on certification alone.
