= Man Made a Bar =

2023 song by Morgan Wallen

Single by Morgan Wallen featuring Eric Church

from the album One Thing at a Time
- Released: November 13, 2023
- Genre: Country
- Length: 3:09
- Label: Big Loud; Republic; Mercury
- Songwriters: Rocky Block; Jordan Dozzi; Larry Fleet; Brett Tyler
- Producer: Joey Moi

Morgan Wallen singles chronology
"Mamaw's House" (2023)	"Man Made a Bar" (2023)	"Cowgirls" (2024)

Eric Church singles chronology
"Doing Life with Me" (2022)	"Man Made a Bar" (2023)	"Darkest Hour" (2024)

Lyric video
- "Man Made a Bar" on YouTube

"Man Made a Bar" is a song by American country music singer Morgan Wallen featuring Eric Church. It was released on November 13, 2023 as the seventh single from Wallen's third studio album One Thing at a Time. It was written by Rocky Block, Jordan Dozzi, Larry Fleet, and Brett Tyler, and produced by Joey Moi.

== Background ==
Wallen says that the song was one of the last recorded for the album:

"That was one of the last songs that made the record. I wasn't thinking about features. Literally the last week, I thought maybe I should get some of my friends on here. I hollered at Eric, sent him the song, he came in and did it, so it was awesome for me, because I'm such a fan of Eric".

Fleet has said that he sent the song to Wallen, his labelmate, because he knew Wallen was looking for songs for his album, but that he would have recorded it himself if Wallen had chosen not to record it:

"I love this song. I was going to do it myself, but my buddy Morgan Wallen needed two songs to finish out that big old record he put out. And so I sent him this one. I said, 'If you want it, you can have it. If not, I'm going to do it'. About a week later, he called me and said, 'Hey, I recorded that song. And I got Eric Church to sing it with me too'. And so this song went to radio. This is my very first number one hit I've ever written for two people at the same time".

== Chart performance ==
"Man Made a Bar" debuted at number 15 on the Billboard Hot 100 on the chart dated March 18, 2023. It reached number one on the Billboard Country Airplay chart dated April 12, 2024. On December 16, 2025, it was certified 3× Platinum by RIAA.

== Live performances ==
Wallen and Church performed "Man Made a Bar" live at the 57th Annual Country Music Association Awards in November 2023.

== Charts ==
=== Weekly charts ===
Weekly chart performance for "Man Made a Bar"
Chart (2023–2024)	Peak position
Australia Country Hot 50 (The Music)	13
Canada Hot 100 (Billboard)	20
Canada Country (Billboard)	1
Global 200 (Billboard)	37
New Zealand Hot Singles (RMNZ)	8
US Billboard Hot 100	15
US Country Airplay (Billboard)	1
US Hot Country Songs (Billboard)	3

=== Year-end charts ===
2023 year-end chart performance for "Man Made a Bar"
Chart (2023)	Position
US Hot Country Songs (Billboard)	39

2024 year-end chart performance for "Man Made a Bar"
Chart (2024)	Position
US Country Airplay (Billboard)	31
US Hot Country Songs (Billboard)	40

== Certifications ==
Certifications for "Man Made a Bar"
Region	Certification	Certified units/sales
Australia (ARIA)	Gold	35,000^{‡}
United States (RIAA)	3× Platinum	3,000,000^{‡}
^{‡} Sales+streaming figures based on certification alone.
