= 180 (Lifestyle) =

2023 song by Morgan Wallen

Song by Morgan Wallen

from the album One Thing at a Time
- Released: March 3, 2023
- Genre: Country rap
- Length: 3:10
- Label: Big Loud; Republic; Mercury
- Songwriters: Ernest; Charlie Handsome; Ashley Gorley; Mark Holman; Blake Pendergrass; London Holmes; Jeffery Williams; Dequantes Lamar; Rocky Block; Bryan Williams; Durk Banks
- Producers: Joey Moi; Jacob Durrett

Lyric video
- "180 (Lifestyle)" on YouTube

"180 (Lifestyle)" is a song by American country music singer Morgan Wallen, released on March 3, 2023, as the 31st track from his third studio album One Thing at a Time. The song was written by Ernest Smith, Charlie Handsome, Ashley Gorley, Mark Holman, Blake Pendergrass, London Holmes, Jeffery Williams, Dequantes Lamar, Rocky Block, Bryan Williams, and Durk Banks. The song was produced by Joey Moi and Jacob Durrett.

== Composition ==
"180 (Lifestyle)" contains a trap-leaning country beat that notably samples "Lifestyle" by Rich Gang, Young Thug, and Rich Homie Quan—with the latter two serving as one of the producers for "180 (Lifestyle)". The song is about a lifestyle change for a woman that changes drastically after meeting a cowboy, with the songs chorus saying, "She don't come from it but, nah', she ain't runnin' from me, yeah, she lovin' the lifestyle", and the song saying lines in parts of the verse, "Broadway city girl" to a "red dirt wild child".

== Chart performance ==
On the US Billboard Hot 100 chart dated March 18, 2023, "180 (Lifestyle)" debuted and peaked at number 63—the song charted the same week as the other 35 tracks from One Thing at a Time, giving Wallen 36 simultaneous entries on the Hot 100 that week, a new record set. The song also debuted and peaked at number 35 on the Billboard Hot Country Songs on the same week. Outside of the US, on the Canadian Hot 100 dated March 18, "180 (Lifestyle)" debuted and peaked at number 57, as well as peaking at number 22 on the NZ Top 40 chart, and peaking at number 169 on the Billboard Global 200 chart.

== Charts ==
Chart performance for "180 (Lifestyle)"
Chart (2023)	Peak position
Canada Hot 100 (Billboard)	57
Global 200 (Billboard)	169
US Billboard Hot 100	63
US Hot Country Songs (Billboard)	35

== Certifications ==
Certifications for "180 (Lifestyle)"
Region	Certification	Certified units/sales
Canada (Music Canada)	Platinum	80,000^{‡}
United States (RIAA)	Platinum	1,000,000^{‡}
^{‡} Sales+streaming figures based on certification alone.
