= Mamaw's House =

Single by Thomas Rhett featuring Morgan Wallen

from the album 20 Number Ones
- Written: August 2020
- Released: September 29, 2023
- Genre: Country pop
- Length: 3:07
- Label: Big Machine
- Songwriters: Morgan Wallen; Thomas Rhett; Matt Dragstrem; Chase McGill
- Producers: Dann Huff; Jesse Frasure

Thomas Rhett singles chronology
| "Talking to Jesus" (2023) | "Mamaw's House" (2023) | "Beautiful as You" (2024) |

Morgan Wallen singles chronology
| "Thinkin' Bout Me" (2023) | "Mamaw's House" (2023) | "Man Made a Bar" (2023) |

Lyric video
- "Mamaw's House" on YouTube

"Mamaw's House" is a song by American country music singer Thomas Rhett featuring Morgan Wallen. It was released on September 29, 2023, through Big Machine, and serves as the lead single from 20 Number Ones.

== Background and composition ==
The song is a fan-favorite and previously unreleased track that was first teased over three years before its actual release. "Mamaw's House" was written in early August 2020 by both Rhett and Wallen. Rhett then shared a rendition of it on his social media a few weeks later. Creation of the song was inspired by an interrupted Zoom call between Rhett and Wallen when the latter's grandmother called him during a writing session. The incident would lead to a track that was otherwise described as something neither of them were "particularly excited by".

However, it was not until September 25, 2023, that he would officially announce the release. Accompanied by a picture of him as a child at his grandmother's home, Rhett posted a lyric of the song as a caption. "Mamaw's House" is an "introspective, wistful ballad" that sees the duo turning the image of their grandmother's house into a "symbol for a simpler, more loving way of life", portraying it "as a sanctuary". It appears as track 22 on Rhett's first compilation album 20 Number Ones, released on September 29.

It marks Rhett's and Wallen's third song with shared co-writer credits, following "Whiskey'd My Way" and "Your Bartender" from Wallen's Dangerous: The Double Album (2021).

== Commercial performance ==
"Mamaw's House" reached number one on the Billboard Country Airplay chart dated March 23, 2024, becoming Rhett's twentieth number one single, and Wallen's eleventh. This distinction also tied Rhett with Brooks & Dunn, Toby Keith and Brad Paisley for the ninth most number-one singles.

== Charts ==
=== Weekly charts ===
Weekly chart performance for "Mamaw's House"
| Chart (2023–2024) | Peak position |
|---|---|
| Canada Hot 100 (Billboard) | 46 |
| Canada Country (Billboard) | 1 |
| New Zealand Hot Singles (RMNZ) | 11 |
| UK Country Airplay (Radiomonitor) | 17 |
| US Billboard Hot 100 | 55 |
| US Country Airplay (Billboard) | 1 |
| US Hot Country Songs (Billboard) | 14 |

=== Year-end charts ===
2024 year-end chart performance for "Mamaw's House"
| Chart (2024) | Position |
|---|---|
| US Country Airplay (Billboard) | 42 |
| US Hot Country Songs (Billboard) | 55 |

== Certifications ==
| Region | Certification | Certified units/sales |
|---|---|---|
| United States (RIAA) | Gold | 500,000^{‡} |
^{‡} Sales+streaming figures based on certification alone.
