= Keith Whitley (song) =

Song by Morgan Wallen

from the album One Thing at a Time
- Released: March 3, 2023
- Genre: Country
- Length: 3:07
- Label: Big Loud; Republic; Mercury
- Songwriters: Thomas Archer; Brad Clawson; Jared Mullins
- Producer: Joey Moi

Lyric video
- "Keith Whitley" on YouTube

"Keith Whitley" is a song by American country music singer Morgan Wallen, released on March 3, 2023 from his third studio album One Thing at a Time. The fourteenth track off the album, written by Thomas Archer, Brad Clawson, and Jared Mullins, is a tribute to Country Music Hall of Famer, Keith Whitley. It debuted at number 44 on the US Billboard Hot 100 chart, where it remained on the chart for two weeks.

== Content ==
The song, a tribute to the late Keith Whitley, contains references to several of Whitley's hits including, "Kentucky Bluebird", "I'm No Stranger to the Rain", and "I Never Go Around Mirrors".

== Critical reception ==
Billy Dukes of Taste of Country ranked the song at number four on their list of One Thing at a Time's best songs.

== Commercial performance ==
"Keith Whitley" debuted at number 44 on the US Billboard Hot 100 chart. The song then remained on the chart for another week before falling off on the chart.

== Charts ==
Chart performance for "Keith Whitley"
Chart (2023)	Peak position
Canada Hot 100 (Billboard)	50
Global 200 (Billboard)	97
US Billboard Hot 100	44
US Hot Country Songs (Billboard)	23

== Certifications ==
Certifications for "Keith Whitley"
Region	Certification	Certified units/sales
Canada (Music Canada)	Gold	40,000^{‡}
United States (RIAA)	Gold	500,000^{‡}
^{‡} Sales+streaming figures based on certification alone.
