= Don't Think Jesus =

2022 song by Morgan Wallen

Promotional single by Morgan Wallen

from the album One Thing at a Time
- Released: April 15, 2022
- Genre: Country
- Length: 3:46
- Label: Big Loud; Republic; Mercury
- Songwriters: Jessi Alexander; Chase McGill; Mark Holman
- Producer: Joey Moi

Lyric video
- "Don't Think Jesus" on YouTube

"Don't Think Jesus" is a song recorded by American country music singer Morgan Wallen. It was released on April 15, 2022, through Big Loud, Republic, and Mercury Records. The song was written by Jessi Alexander, Chase McGill and Mark Holman, and produced by Joey Moi.

== Background and composition ==
The song came about as early as October 2021, when Wallen took to his socials to perform an acoustic version of the song. Wallen said that the track brought him to tears upon first hearing it. Despite not having been written by the singer, it was said to be one of his most personal songs yet. However, it was written with the singer in mind. About the creation of the song, he revealed, "some of my friends sent me a song today…they wrote the song with me on their mind and it made me cry in the truck". Lyrically, the song describes the story of a boy turning to Jesus after having committed several shameful actions. He ultimately announced the song to be his next single in April 2022, deliberately choosing to drop on Good Friday in honor of the Easter weekend. The song was described as a "serious and introspective ballad that takes listener's through an unnamed boy's thoughts on life".

== Critical reception ==
Wes Langeler of Whiskey Riff said that the track "might just be the most meaningful song he's ever released". Clayton Edwards at Outsider opined that the tale of the song "probably sounds familiar to Morgan Wallen fans". He saw the "slow, stripped-down, guitar-driven" track as a return to "the songs that launched Morgan Wallen to fame".

== Charts ==
=== Weekly charts ===
Weekly chart performance for "Don't Think Jesus"
Chart (2022)	Peak position
Canada Hot 100 (Billboard)	27
Global 200 (Billboard)	14
New Zealand Hot Singles (RMNZ)	24
US Billboard Hot 100	7
US Country Airplay (Billboard)	46
US Hot Country Songs (Billboard)	1

=== Year-end charts ===
2022 year-end chart performance for "Don't Think Jesus"
Chart (2022)	Position
US Digital Song Sales (Billboard)	70
US Hot Country Songs (Billboard)	58

== Certifications ==
Region	Certification	Certified units/sales
Canada (Music Canada)	Gold	40,000^{‡}
United States (RIAA)	Platinum	1,000,000^{‡}
^{‡} Sales+streaming figures based on certification alone.
