= Born with a Beer in My Hand =

Song by Morgan Wallen

from the album One Thing at a Time
- Released: March 3, 2023
- Genre: Country
- Length: 3:07
- Label: Big Loud; Republic; Mercury
- Songwriters: Morgan Wallen; Zach Abend; Michael Hardy
- Producer: Joey Moi

Lyric video
- "Born with a Beer in My Hand" on YouTube

"Born with a Beer in My Hand" is a song by American country music singer Morgan Wallen, released on March 3, 2023, from his third studio album, One Thing at a Time. The opening track to the album, it debuted at number 32 on the US Billboard Hot 100 chart.

== Content ==
The opening track to his third studio album, One Thing at a Time, "Born with a Beer in My Hand" tells listeners that Wallen acknowledges his drinking history and is trying to moderate it, singing in the chorus, "I ain't sayin' I swore it off for good / I'm just sayin' I'm doin' the best I can". He goes on to say in the second verse that his drinking is an influence for his songs, singing "When I was puttin' 'em down, they put me through hell / Put some scars on some trucks, myself as well / But if I never did put that can to my mouth / I wouldn't have nothin' I could sing about".

== Critical reception ==
Billy Dukes of Taste of Country ranked the song at number sixteen on their list of One Thing at a Time's best songs.

== Commercial performance ==
"Born with a Beer in My Hand" debuted at number 32 on the US Billboard Hot 100 chart. The song remained on the chart for another two weeks before falling off the chart after three weeks. It charted on the US Hot Country Songs chart for ten weeks, debuting and peaking at number 15. It charted on the Billboard Global 200 chart for one week before falling off.

== Charts ==
=== Weekly charts ===
Weekly performance for "Born with a Beer in my Hand"
Chart (2023)	Peak position
Canada Hot 100 (Billboard)	26
Global 200 (Billboard)	65
US Billboard Hot 100	32
US Hot Country Songs (Billboard)	15

=== Year-end charts ===
Year-end chart performance for "Born with a Beer in my Hand"
Chart (2023)	Position
US Hot Country Songs (Billboard)	96

== Certifications ==
Region	Certification	Certified units/sales
Canada (Music Canada)	Platinum	80,000^{‡}
^{‡} Sales+streaming figures based on certification alone.
