= Sunrise (Morgan Wallen song) =

2023 song by Morgan Wallen

Song by Morgan Wallen

from the album One Thing at a Time
- Released: March 3, 2023
- Genre: Country rap
- Length: 3:01
- Label: Big Loud; Republic; Mercury
- Songwriters: John Byron; Blake Pendergrass
- Producers: Joey Moi; Jacob Durrett

Lyric video
- "Sunrise" on YouTube

"Sunrise" is a song by American country music singer Morgan Wallen, released on March 3, 2023 from his third studio album One Thing at a Time. It was written by John Byron and Blake Pendergrass, and it was produced by Joey Moi and Jacob Durrett.

== Composition ==
"Sunrise" contains a trap-leaning beat composed and centers on memories with a former partner told from the perspective of a man. Morgan Wallen uses the metaphor of the sunrise to describe a flashback of a memory of a past love affair.

== Charts ==
=== Weekly charts ===
Chart performance for "Sunrise"
Chart (2023)	Peak position
Canada Hot 100 (Billboard)	31
Global 200 (Billboard)	62
US Billboard Hot 100	30
US Hot Country Songs (Billboard)	14

=== Year-end charts ===
Year-end chart performance for "Sunrise"
Chart (2023)	Position
US Hot Country Songs (Billboard)	43

== Certifications ==
Region	Certification	Certified units/sales
Canada (Music Canada)	Platinum	80,000^{‡}
United States (RIAA)	2× Platinum	2,000,000^{‡}
^{‡} Sales+streaming figures based on certification alone.
