= Stand by Me (Lil Durk song) =

Single by Lil Durk featuring Morgan Wallen (2023)

Single by Lil Durk featuring Morgan Wallen

from the album Almost Healed
- Released: July 14, 2023
- Genre: Country; drill
- Length: 3:39
- Label: Only the Family; Alamo; Sony
- Songwriters: Durk Banks; Morgan Wallen; Łukasz Gottwald; Rocco Valdes; Ernest Smith; Jacob Durrett; Ryan Ogren; Gamal Lewis; Ryan Vojtesak
- Producer: Dr. Luke

Lil Durk singles chronology
"Pelle Coat" (2023)	"Stand by Me" (2023)	"F*ck U Thought" (2023)

Morgan Wallen singles chronology
"Everything I Love" (2023)	"Stand by Me" (2023)	"Thinkin' Bout Me" (2023)

Audio video
- "Stand by Me" on YouTube

"Stand by Me" is a song by American rapper Lil Durk featuring American country music singer Morgan Wallen. It was released through Only the Family, Alamo Records, and Sony Music as the third and final single from his eighth studio album, Almost Healed, on July 14, 2023. Produced by Dr. Luke, it is the second collaboration between the two artists following "Broadway Girls".

== Critical reception ==
The song was met with generally negative reviews from critics. Mosi Reeves of Rolling Stone described Lil Durk as "continuing a treacly yet charismatic pop-country collaboration". Louis Pavlakos of HipHopDX commented it "reeks of desperation from a man seeking approval from people who don't respect Hip Hop". In a review of Almost Healed for Pitchfork, Dylan Green criticized how the album "jumps between these personal revelations, sappy crossover treacle, and standard drill-and-pain tracks", additionally writing, "That balance is upset a handful of times, most notably on 'Stand by Me', Durk's second collaboration with country singer Morgan Wallen. Their dedications to faceless love interests are sapped of all the detail, urgency, and personality that drives Durk's best songs".

== Charts ==
=== Weekly charts ===
Weekly chart performance for "Stand by Me"
Chart (2023)	Peak position
Australia (ARIA)	76
Canada Hot 100 (Billboard)	27
Global 200 (Billboard)	53
New Zealand Hot Singles (RMNZ)	5
US Billboard Hot 100	22
US Hot R&B/Hip-Hop Songs (Billboard)	8
US Rhythmic Airplay (Billboard)	35

=== Year-end charts ===
Year-end chart performance for "Stand by Me"
Chart (2023)	Position
Canada (Canadian Hot 100)	96
US Hot R&B/Hip-Hop Songs (Billboard)	36

== Certifications ==
Certifications for "Stand by Me"
Region	Certification	Certified units/sales
Canada (Music Canada)	Platinum	80,000^{‡}
United States (RIAA)	Platinum	1,000,000^{‡}
^{‡} Sales+streaming figures based on certification alone.
