= Ain't That Some =

2023 song by Morgan Wallen

Song by Morgan Wallen

from the album One Thing at a Time
- Released: March 3, 2023
- Genre: Country rap
- Length: 2:37
- Label: Big Loud; Republic; Mercury
- Songwriters: Chris LaCorte; Chase McGill; Josh Miller; Blake Pendergrass
- Producer: Joey Moi

Lyric video
- "Ain't That Some" on YouTube

"Ain't That Some" is a song by American country music singer Morgan Wallen, released on March 3, 2023, from his third studio album One Thing at a Time. It was written by Chris LaCorte, Chase McGill, Josh Miller and Blake Pendergrass, and it was produced by Joey Moi.

== Critical reception ==
Billy Dukes of Taste of Country ranked the song at number two on their list of One Thing at a Time's best songs.

== Chart performance ==
"Ain't That Some" debuted at number 11 on the Billboard Hot 100 on the chart dated March 18, 2023. The song then remained on the chart for 20 weeks before falling off on the chart.

On the Hot Country Songs chart that week, it debuted at number six.

== Charts ==
=== Weekly charts ===
Chart performance for "Ain't That Some"
Chart (2023)	Peak position
Australia (ARIA)	53
Canada Hot 100 (Billboard)	10
Global 200 (Billboard)	23
New Zealand Hot Singles (RMNZ)	6
US Billboard Hot 100	11
US Hot Country Songs (Billboard)	6

=== Year-end charts ===
Year-end chart performance for "Ain't That Some"
Chart (2023)	Position
Canada (Canadian Hot 100)	74
US Billboard Hot 100	92
US Hot Country Songs (Billboard)	29

== Certifications ==
Region	Certification	Certified units/sales
Australia (ARIA)	Platinum	70,000^{‡}
Canada (Music Canada)	4× Platinum	320,000^{‡}
New Zealand (RMNZ)	Platinum	30,000^{‡}
United States (RIAA)	3× Platinum	3,000,000^{‡}
^{‡} Sales+streaming figures based on certification alone.
