= One Thing at a Time (song) =

- EP cover

Single by Morgan Wallen

from the album One Thing at a Time
- Released: March 13, 2023
- Genre: Country; synth-pop
- Length: 3:27
- Label: Big Loud; Republic; Mercury
- Songwriters: Morgan Wallen; Ashley Gorley; Ernest Keith Smith; Ryan Vojtesak
- Producer: Joey Moi

Morgan Wallen singles chronology
"Last Night" (2023)	"One Thing at a Time" (2023)	"Everything I Love" (2023)

Lyric video
- "One Thing at a Time" on YouTube

"One Thing at a Time" is a song co-written and recorded by American country music singer Morgan Wallen. Wallen wrote the song with Ashley Gorley, Ernest Keith Smith, and Ryan Vojtesak, and it was produced by Joey Moi. It is the title track and third single (fourth overall) at country radio from his 2023 album, One Thing at a Time.

== Chart performance ==
"One Thing at a Time" debuted at number two on the Billboard Hot Country Songs chart dated for December 17, 2022, behind Wallen's own "You Proof". As the song ascended the Country Airplay chart simultaneously with "Last Night", and overlapped with previous single "You Proof", Wallen thus became the first solo artist to have three songs in the top fifteen positions of the Country Airplay chart simultaneously. This was achieved on the chart dated April 13, 2023. On December 16, 2025, it was certified 3× Platinum by RIAA.

== Charts ==
=== Weekly charts ===
Weekly chart performance for "One Thing at a Time"
Chart (2022–2023)	Peak position
Australia (ARIA)	62
Australia Country Hot 50 (The Music)	4
Canada Hot 100 (Billboard)	16
Canada Country (Billboard)	1
Global 200 (Billboard)	24
Netherlands (Tipparade)	13
New Zealand Hot Singles (RMNZ)	19
US Billboard Hot 100	10
US Country Airplay (Billboard)	8
US Hot Country Songs (Billboard)	2

=== Year-end charts ===
Year-end chart performance for "One Thing at a Time"
Chart (2023)	Position
Canada (Canadian Hot 100)	39
US Billboard Hot 100	37
US Country Airplay (Billboard)	44
US Hot Country Songs (Billboard)	11

== Certifications ==
Certifications for "One Thing at a Time"
Region	Certification	Certified units/sales
Australia (ARIA)	Platinum	70,000^{‡}
Canada (Music Canada)	4× Platinum	320,000^{‡}
New Zealand (RMNZ)	Gold	15,000^{‡}
United States (RIAA)	3× Platinum	3,000,000^{‡}
^{‡} Sales+streaming figures based on certification alone.

== Release history ==
Release dates and formats for "One Thing at a Time"
Region	Date	Format(s)	Label(s)	Ref.
United States	December 2, 2022 (Note: Release as a promotional single)	Digital download; streaming	Big Loud; Republic; Mercury	
United States	March 13, 2023	Country radio	Big Loud; Mercury	
