= I Wrote the Book (Morgan Wallen song) =

2023 song by Morgan Wallen

Song by Morgan Wallen

from the album One Thing at a Time
- Released: January 31, 2023
- Genre: Country rap; country rock
- Length: 3:01
- Label: Big Loud; Republic; Mercury
- Songwriters: Morgan Wallen; Michael Hardy; Cameron Montgomery
- Producers: Joey Moi; Cameron Montgomery; Jacob Durrett

Lyric video
- "I Wrote the Book" on YouTube

"I Wrote the Book" is a song by American country music singer Morgan Wallen, released on January 31, 2023 from the second sampler of his third studio album One Thing at a Time. It was written by Morgan Wallen, Michael Hardy, and Cameron Montgomery, and produced by Joey Moi, Cameron Montgomery and Jacob Durrett. The song is about "reconnection with the Bible".

== Background ==
Wallen teased of the new song on his social media accounts on January 20, 2023. In January 30, 2023, Wallen revealed One Thing at a Time would be released at March 3, 2023, the same day Wallen released a sampler included "Last Night", "Everything I Love", and "I Wrote the Book".

== Critical reception ==
Billy Duke of website Taste of Country referred to the song as "the '80s style guitar Wallen relies on during "Everything I Love" returns here, paired with a drum track and power melody".

== Chart performance ==
"I Wrote the Book" debuted at number 58 on the Billboard Hot 100 on the chart dated February 11, 2023, jumping to number 38 the following week.

Following the release of One Thing at a Time, it ascended from number 64 to number 18 on the Billboard Hot 100 dated March 18, 2023.

== Charts ==
=== Weekly charts ===
Chart performance for "I Wrote the Book"
Chart (2023)	Peak position
Australia (ARIA)	97
Canada Hot 100 (Billboard)	22
Global 200 (Billboard)	40
New Zealand Hot Singles (RMNZ)	35
US Billboard Hot 100	18
US Country Airplay (Billboard)	60
US Hot Country Songs (Billboard)	9

=== Year-end charts ===
Year-end chart performance for "I Wrote the Book"
Chart (2023)	Position
US Billboard Hot 100	95
US Hot Country Songs (Billboard)	30

== Certifications ==
Region	Certification	Certified units/sales
Australia (ARIA)	Gold	35,000^{‡}
United States (RIAA)	Platinum	1,000,000^{‡}
^{‡} Sales+streaming figures based on certification alone.

== Release history ==
Release history for "I Wrote the Book"
Region	Date	Format	Label	Ref.
Various	January 31, 2023	Digital download; streaming	Big Loud; Republic; Mercury	
