= '98 Braves =

Song by Morgan Wallen

from the album One Thing at a Time
- Released: March 3, 2023
- Genre: Country
- Length: 2:58
- Label: Big Loud; Republic; Mercury
- Songwriters: John Byron; Josh Miller; Travis Wood
- Producer: Joey Moi

Lyric video
- "'98 Braves" on YouTube

"'98 Braves" is a song by American country music singer Morgan Wallen, released on March 3, 2023, from his third studio album One Thing at a Time. The song is the seventh track off the album, and was written by John Byron, Josh Miller, and Travis Wood. It debuted at number 27 on the US Billboard Hot 100 chart, where it remained on the chart for seven weeks.

== Lyrics and composition ==
The song, written by John Byron, Josh Miller, and Travis Wood, relates the story of a relationship between Wallen and a former lover and the ending of the 1998 Atlanta Braves season, in which the Atlanta Braves lost to the San Diego Padres in Game 6 of the 1998 National League Championship Series. The 1998 Atlanta Braves were seen as one of the greatest Major League Baseball teams of all time, despite not winning a championship. The comparison between the season and the romance is a recurring theme within the song. The first verse references several players, namely Andruw and Chipper Jones, "Between them big three pitchers / Andruw and Chipper / It was gonna be hard to keep up with the Jones'". The lines that round out the first verse talk about the Braves loss in the series and compares it to the relationship, "But as fate would have it that Atlanta magic / Got put out by them damn Padres / I guess destiny ain't always meant to be / Kinda like you and me that day". The chorus goes on about how the couple got close, but being close "didn't cut it" and how the pair had "a good run and ended up with nothing but a 3x5 that you hide in a drawer". This was in reference to the Braves getting as close as they could to the 1998 World Series, and yet not ending up with a World Series ring, also shown in the second verse, "But just like that season / Girl you and me didn't end with a ring on a hand". The chorus ends with the lyric comparing the two, "If we were a team and love was a game / We'd have been the '98 Braves".

== Critical reception ==
Billy Dukes of Taste of Country ranked the song at number seven on their list of One Thing at a Time's best songs. Dukes says that if One Thing at a Time had to be sized down to twelve songs, "'98 Braves" would make the cut.

== Commercial performance ==
"'98 Braves" debuted at number 27 on the US Billboard Hot 100 chart. The song then remained on the chart for another six weeks before falling off the chart. It debuted at number 53 on the Billboard Global 200, along with the rest of One Thing at a Time. It peaked at number 11 on the Hot Country Songs chart, as well.

== Charts ==
Chart performance for "'98 Braves"
Chart (2023)	Peak position
Canada Hot 100 (Billboard)	24
Global 200 (Billboard)	53
US Billboard Hot 100	27
US Country Airplay (Billboard)	56
US Hot Country Songs (Billboard)	11

== Certifications ==
Certifications for "98 Braves"
Region	Certification	Certified units/sales
Canada (Music Canada)	2× Platinum	160,000^{‡}
United States (RIAA)	Platinum	1,000,000^{‡}
^{‡} Sales+streaming figures based on certification alone.
