= One Thing at a Time =

Studio album by Morgan Wallen
- Released: March 3, 2023
- Recorded: 2022
- Studio: Abbey Road (London)
- Genre: Country pop
- Length: 111:36
- Label: Big Loud; Republic; Mercury
- Producer: Joey Moi; Cameron Montgomery; Charlie Handsome; Jacob Durrett

Morgan Wallen chronology
Dangerous: The Double Album (2021)	One Thing at a Time (2023)	I'm the Problem (2025)

Singles from One Thing at a Time
- 1. "You Proof" Released: July 18, 2022; 2. "Thought You Should Know" Released: November 7, 2022; 3. "Last Night" Released: January 31, 2023; 4. "One Thing at a Time" Released: March 13, 2023; 5. "Everything I Love" Released: June 26, 2023; 6. "Thinkin' Bout Me" Released: September 7, 2023; 7. "Man Made a Bar" Released: November 13, 2023; 8. "Cowgirls" Released: April 15, 2024

One Thing at a Time is the third studio album by American country music singer Morgan Wallen. It was released on March 3, 2023, through Big Loud, Republic, and Mercury Records. One Thing at a Time features guest appearances from Eric Church, Hardy, and Ernest, and was produced by Wallen himself, Joey Moi, Cameron Montgomery, Charlie Handsome, and Jacob Durrett. One Thing at a Time was primarily recorded in London at Abbey Road Studios, in studio number-two.

With a running time over 111 minutes, One Thing at a Time consists of 36 tracks and spawned eight singles: "You Proof", "Thought You Should Know", "Last Night", the title track, "Everything I Love", "Thinkin' Bout Me", "Man Made a Bar", and "Cowgirls", alongside the promotional single "Don't Think Jesus". Predating the release of One Thing at a Time, an extended play was released on December 2, 2022, and included three tracks: the title track, "Days That End in Why", and "Tennessee Fan". After One Thing at a Time was announced on January 30, 2023, three more tracks released: "Everything I Love", "I Wrote the Book", and "Last Night"—the latter became his first Billboard Hot 100 number one, peaking the chart for 16 non-consecutive weeks.

Despite receiving mixed reviews from music critics for being too monotonous, One Thing at a Time debuted atop the US Billboard 200 and spent 19 non-consecutive weeks atop the chart throughout 2023 and 2024. The album broke the record set by Garth Brooks' Ropin' the Wind for the longest-running number-one country album on the respective chart, and has spent 87 weeks atop the Top Country Albums chart. In March 2025, the album would become the second album to spend at least 100 weeks within the top-ten of the US Billboard 200, after Wallen's own Dangerous: The Double Album achieved the milestone in 2022. Aside from the US, the album would additionally peak atop the charts in Australia, New Zealand, and Canada—where the album holds the record for the most weeks spent at number-one by a male artist. In support of the album, Wallen embarked on the One Night at a Time Tour in April 2023. In December 2025, it was certified 9× Platinum by RIAA.

== Background and themes ==
On January 8, 2021, Wallen would release his sophomore studio album Dangerous: The Double Album. The album would receive positive reviews from critics, many of which praised Wallen's strong voice and clever songwriting, while some considered the album to be "about 19 songs too long", critiquing the thirty song length of the album. Regardless of the reception, the album would debut atop both the US Billboard 200 and US Top Country Albums chart, becoming Wallen's first chart topper on the former and his second on the latter. The album would eventually spend its first ten weeks atop the US Billboard 200, becoming the first album to achieve such a feat since Whitney Houston's Whitney did so in 1987. The album would remain a commercial juggernaut throughout the years, becoming the first album by a solely credited artist to spend 100 weeks in the top-ten of the US Billboard 200, and would set the all-time record for the most weeks atop the US Top Country Albums chart: 97 weeks.

On December 2, 2022, rumors began spreading that Wallen had been working on a follow-up to his sophomore album Dangerous: The Double Album. The rumors spread since Wallen would release One Thing at a Time (Sampler), his fourth extended play on that same day. The extended play consisted of three tracks: the title track, "Tennessee Fan", and "Days That End in Why". The three respective tracks would appear on One Thing at a Time when released. After the album was announced on January 30, 2023, Wallen himself stated and explained that One Thing at a Time would "bring together the musical influences that have shaped [him] as an artist – country, alternative and hip-hop". He additionally revealed that the album would have 36 songs "because [they] just kept exploring with fresh lyrics, music and production ideas and these are the songs that felt right" to him. Billboard would further describe the album as "genre-blending", and would reveal that the album artwork was taken at Wallen's grandfather's home in Sneedville, Tennessee.

One Thing at a Time is a country album that incorporates elements of country pop, alternative, and hip-hop—the latter genre is most relevant on the tracks "Ain't That Some", "Neon Star (Country Boy Lullaby)", "180 (Lifestyle)", and "Cowgirls". American rock band The Allman Brothers' "Midnight Rider" was interpolated on the track "Everything I Love", while Rich Homie Quan and Young Thug's "Lifestyle" was interpolated on the track "180 (Lifestyle)". One Thing at a Time explores themes of love, break-up, heartbreak, personal struggles, drinking, and redemption— while the tracks "In the Bible", "Don't Think Jesus", "Outlook", and "Dying Man" explore themes of Wallen's religious beliefs—believing in God, and rediscovering his spirituality.

== Critical reception ==
Professional ratings
Aggregate scores
Source	Rating
Metacritic	47/100
Review scores
Source	Rating
AllMusic	2.5/5 stars
Pitchfork	4.1/10
Slant Magazine	2.5/5 stars
Holler	8.5/10

One Thing at a Time received mixed reviews from critics, with a score of 47 out of 100 based on six critics' reviews at review aggregator Metacritic. Paul Attard of Slant Magazine found One Thing at a Time to be "wildly uneven" with "little here that could be considered fresh by Wallen's standards", as "his music is typically concerned with one of three things: getting shitfaced, being lovesick, or Jesus" while still having several "production flourishes" that see Wallen "experimenting, if ever so slightly, with his sound".

Stephen Thomas Erlewine of AllMusic wrote that the album's "untrammeled sprawl [of 36 tracks] means [it] offers a little something for everybody", with "party songs, sad songs, songs that lift liberally from classic rock standards" as well as "songs about beer, songs about whiskey, and songs about wine". Sam Sodomsky of Pitchfork criticized the length, apparent ethos of "Wallen being true to only himself" while having 49 co-writers, and the tracks "covering the same thematic territory", although acknowledging there are occasional "minimalist rhythms" that "accentuate his gift for delivering tugging, bittersweet pop melodies" as well as "couplets clever enough to catch you off guard". Sodomsky felt that the title "seems to acknowledge that Wallen considers this a transitional moment" and concluded that "none of this leads to anything interesting enough to change how you think of Morgan Wallen".

In contrast, Maxim Mower of Holler praised the album as evidence of Wallen's artistic evolution since Dangerous, writing "with One Thing at a Time, Wallen has crafted an album that is more lyrically intricate, emotionally mature and sonically fulfilling than his record-breaking, standard-setting opus".

== Commercial performance ==
One Thing at a Time debuted at number one on the US Billboard 200 dated March 18, 2023, moving 501,000 album-equivalent units, including 111,500 from pure album sales. The first week album-equivalent units moved was considerably larger than the 265,000 moved from his previous release, Dangerous: The Double Album in 2021. One Thing at a Time became Wallen's second consecutive number one album on the US Billboard 200 and marked the biggest week of 2023 at the time by album-equivalent units earned, and was the biggest week for a country album since Red (Taylor's Version) by Taylor Swift moved 604,500 album-equivalent units in 2021. The album would spend its first twelve weeks atop the US Billboard 200, becoming the fourth album to spend at least its first ten weeks atop the chart, (Note: After Stevie Wonder's Songs in the Key of Life (1976), Whitney Houston's Whitney (1987), and Wallen's own Dangerous: The Double Album (2021).) and the album blocked various other albums from reaching number one on the respective chart. Later throughout 2023 and in 2024, the album would spend multiple non-consecutive weeks atop the respective chart, totaling up to 19 non-consecutive weeks atop the US Billboard 200–thus breaking the record set by Ropin' the Wind by Garth Brooks for the most weeks spent atop the respective chart for a country album, and supplanting the record held by Un Verano Sin Ti by Bad Bunny for the most weeks at number on in the 2020s decade. As of March 19, 2025, the album holds the second longest amount of time spent atop the Top Country Albums chart, with 87 weeks at number one—behind only Wallen's own Dangerous: The Double Album.

On the Billboard Hot 100 dated March 18, 2023, all 36 tracks from the album charted simultaneously, causing Wallen to supplant the record set by Drake (27) for the most simultaneous chart entries in a single week. Wallen additionally charted five songs in the top-ten of the Billboard Hot 100 in the same week, being "Last Night" (at No. 1), "Thought You Should Know" (No. 7), "You Proof" (No. 8), "Thinkin' Bout Me" (No. 9), and the title track (No. 10). The album held the record for the fifth-largest streaming week of all time at the time of its release, earning a total of 498.28 million on-demand streams. On the Billboard year-end chart, the album was named the number one album in 2023 while "Last Night" was named the number one song in 2023, this caused Wallen to become the first country artist to capture both the year-end number one album and single in the same year. The album has been certified 9× Platinum by RIAA. Outside of the United States, the album would peak at number one in Canada, Australia, and New Zealand. One Thing at a Time additionally peaked within the top-twenty in Norway and Ireland, and also charted moderately in Scotland and the United Kingdom.

== Track listing ==
One Thing at a Time track listing
No.	Title	Writer(s)	Length
1.	"Born with a Beer in My Hand"	Morgan Wallen; Zach Abend; Michael Hardy	3:07
2.	"Last Night"	John Byron; Ashley Gorley; Jacob Kasher Hindlin; Ryan Vojtesak	2:43
3.	"Everything I Love"	Wallen; Gorley; Ernest Keith Smith; Vojtesak; Gregg Allman; Robert Kim Payne	3:05
4.	"Man Made a Bar" (featuring Eric Church)	Rocky Block; Jordan Dozzi; Larry Fleet; Brett Tyler	3:09
5.	"Devil Don't Know"	Travis Denning; Jared Mullins; Ben Stennis	3:24
6.	"One Thing at a Time"	Gorley; Smith; Vojtesak; Wallen	3:26
7.	"'98 Braves"	Byron; Josh Miller; Travis Wood	2:58
8.	"Ain't That Some"	Chris LaCorte; Chase McGill; Miller; Blake Pendergrass	2:37
9.	"I Wrote the Book"	Wallen; Hardy; Cameron Montgomery	3:00
10.	"Tennessee Numbers"	Jordan Minton; Pendergrass; Wood	3:45
11.	"Hope That's True"	Wallen; Smith; Vojtesak	3:05
12.	"Whiskey Friends"	Wallen; Gorley; Jonathan Hoskins; Smith; Josh Thompson; Vojtesak	3:24
13.	"Sunrise"	Byron; Pendergrass	3:01
14.	"Keith Whitley"	Thomas Archer; Brad Clawson; Mullins	3:07
15.	"In the Bible" (featuring Hardy)	Byron; Jeff Garrison; Jon Hall; Ben Johnson; Geoffrey Warburton	3:14
16.	"You Proof"	Wallen; Gorley; Smith; Vojtesak	2:36
17.	"Thought You Should Know"	Wallen; Nicolle Galyon; Miranda Lambert	3:34
18.	"F150-50"	Mullins; John Pierce; Stennis	3:10
19.	"Neon Star (Country Boy Lullaby)"	Wallen; Smith; Thompson; Vojtesak	2:51
20.	"I Deserve a Drink"	Byron; Devin Dawson; Jacob Durrett; Hillary Lindsey	3:24
21.	"Wine into Water"	Byron; Matt Jenkins; Pendergrass	3:43
22.	"Me + All Your Reasons"	Wallen; Gorley; Smith; Vojtesak	2:53
23.	"Tennessee Fan"	Wallen; Gorley; Hardy; Mark Holman	3:18
24.	"Money on Me"	Michael Lotten; Pendergrass; Matt Roy	2:55
25.	"Thinkin' Bout Me"	Byron; Gorley; Taylor Phillips; Vojtesak	2:57
26.	"Single Than She Was"	Byron; Johnson; Vojtesak	2:40
27.	"Days That End in Why"	Byron; Pendergrass; Driver Williams	2:41
28.	"Last Drive Down Main"	Jerry Flowers; Ryan Hurd; Lotten	3:13
29.	"Me to Me"	Wallen; Gorley; Smith; Vojtesak	2:18
30.	"Don't Think Jesus"	Jessi Alexander; Holman; McGill	3:44
31.	"180 (Lifestyle)"	Block; Gorley; Holman; Pendergrass; Smith; Vojtesak; Bryan Williams; Jeffrey Williams; Dequantes Lamar; London Holmes; Arsenio Archer; Durk Banks	3:07
32.	"Had It"	Block; Alexander Izquierdo; Vojtesak	3:18
33.	"Cowgirls" (featuring Ernest)	Block; Gorley; James Maddocks; Smith; Vojtesak	3:01
34.	"Good Girl Gone Missin'"	Wallen; Gorley; Maddocks; Smith; Vojtesak	2:54
35.	"Outlook"	Wallen; Rodney Clawson; Jeff Hyde	3:13
36.	"Dying Man"	Johnson; Pendergrass; Thompson	3:02
Total length:			111:37

Notes

- "Everything I Love" features an interpolation from "Midnight Rider" by The Allman Brothers Band.
- "180 (Lifestyle)" features an interpolation from "Lifestyle" by Rich Gang.

== Personnel ==
Credits adapted from Tidal and the album's liner notes.

=== Musicians ===
- Morgan Wallen – vocals
- Jerry Roe – drums (tracks 1, 3–8, 10–12, 14–24, 26–32, 34–36), percussion (1–7, 9, 11, 15, 17–19, 23–25, 27, 28, 30, 32, 34–36)
- Mark Hill – bass (6)
- Jimmie Lee Sloas – bass (1, 3–5, 7–15, 17–24, 26–33, 35, 36)
- Tom Bukovac – electric guitar
- Dominic Frost – electric guitar (23, 29)
- Charlie Handsome – electric guitar (3, 25), programming (2, 16, 25, 31, 34)
- Derek Wells – electric guitar (1, 3, 11)
- Todd Lombardo – acoustic guitar (5, 16, 27, 30, 35), mandolin (17, 30)
- Bryan Sutton – acoustic guitar (1–15, 17–29, 31–34, 36), banjo (8), bouzouki (36), Dobro (11), mandolin (4, 7, 8, 14, 15, 20, 23, 28–30, 33, 36), ukulele (2), resonator guitar (unspecified tracks)
- Dave Cohen – keyboards (all tracks), Hammond B3 organ (17, 30, 35)
- Dan Dugmore – steel guitar (4, 10, 14, 20, 36)
- Paul Franklin – steel guitar (5, 7, 17, 30, 32)
- Wes Hightower – background vocals (3, 14, 15, 28, 33)
- Ashlyne Wallen – background vocals (35)
- Zach Abend – programming (1)
- Jacob Durrett – programming (8, 9, 13, 19, 31, 33)
- James Maddocks – programming (34)
- Cameron Montgomery – programming (9)
- Ben Stennis – programming (18)
- Eric Church – vocals (track 4)
- Hardy – vocals (track 15)
- Ernest – vocals (track 33)

=== Technical ===
- Joey Moi – production, mixing
- Charlie Handsome – co-production (tracks 2, 16, 25, 34)
- Jacob Durrett – co-production (9, 13, 19, 31, 33)
- Cameron Montgomery – co-production (9)
- Ted Jensen – mastering (1–5, 7–22, 24–26, 28–36)
- Justin Shturtz – mastering (6, 23, 27)
- Josh Ditty – recording, editing (all tracks); co-mixing (3, 35)
- Elvind Mordland – editing (all tracks), co-mixing (1, 25, 26)
- Ryan Yount – editing, recording assistance
- Scott Cooke – editing
- Steve Cordray – recording assistance
- Joey Stanca – recording assistance
- Sean Badum – recording assistance
- Lucas Glenney-Tegtmeier – recording assistance
- Ally Gecewicz – production coordination

=== Visuals ===
- Morgan Wallen – art direction
- Tori Johnson – art direction, graphic design
- Ryan Smith – photography
- David Lehr – cover edit, graphic design
- Annette Kirk – graphic design

== Charts ==
=== Weekly charts ===
Weekly chart performance for One Thing at a Time
Chart (2023–2024)	Peak position
Australian Albums (ARIA)	1
Australian Country Albums (ARIA)	1
Canadian Albums (Billboard)	1
Irish Albums (OCC)	14
New Zealand Albums (RMNZ)	1
Norwegian Albums (VG-lista)	9
Scottish Albums (OCC)	30
UK Albums (OCC)	40
UK Country Albums (OCC)	1
US Billboard 200	1
US Top Country Albums (Billboard)	1

=== Year-end charts ===
2023 year-end chart performance for One Thing at a Time
Chart (2023)	Position
Australian Albums (ARIA)	4
Canadian Albums (Billboard)	1
New Zealand Albums (RMNZ)	8
US Billboard 200	1
US Top Country Albums (Billboard)	1

2024 year-end chart performance for One Thing at a Time
Chart (2024)	Position
Australian Albums (ARIA)	8
Australian Country Albums (ARIA)	1
Canadian Albums (Billboard)	2
Global Albums (IFPI)	7
New Zealand Albums (RMNZ)	7
UK Albums (OCC)	98
US Billboard 200	3
US Top Country Albums (Billboard)	1

2025 year-end chart performance for One Thing at a Time
Chart (2025)	Position
Australian Albums (ARIA)	28
Canadian Albums (Billboard)	5
US Billboard 200	7
US Top Country Albums (Billboard)	2

== Certifications ==
Certifications for One Thing at a Time
Region	Certification	Certified units/sales
Australia (ARIA)	2× Platinum	140,000^{‡}
Canada (Music Canada)	4× Platinum	320,000^{‡}
Denmark (IFPI Danmark)	Gold	10,000^{‡}
New Zealand (RMNZ)	2× Platinum	30,000^{‡}
United Kingdom (BPI)	Gold	100,000^{‡}
United States (RIAA)	9× Platinum	9,000,000^{‡}
^{‡} Sales+streaming figures based on certification alone.
