= Charlie Handsome =

American record producer and songwriter

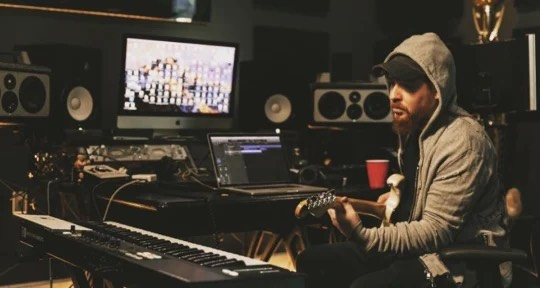

Background information
- Born: Ryan Vojtesak; Atlanta, Georgia, U.S.
- Genres: Country; pop; hip-hop
- Occupations: Record producer; songwriter
- Years active: 2014–present

Ryan Vojtesak, known professionally as Charlie Handsome, is an American record producer and songwriter from Atlanta, Georgia. Vojtesak has been credited on albums for artists including BigXthaPlug, Post Malone, Khalid, Drake, Kanye West, Travis Scott, The Weeknd, Young Thug, Juice WRLD, Chance the Rapper, Kodak Black, Sam Hunt, and Morgan Wallen.

== Early life and career ==
Vojtesak began playing the guitar and writing songs at age 14. He dropped out of high school and wrote songs as a hobby while pursuing a career in construction. In 2014, after meeting with G.O.O.D Music President Che Pope, Vojtesak moved to Los Angeles to pursue music a full time career in music, citing G.O.O.D Music founder Kanye West as a significant early inspiration. Later that year, Vojtesak met and began working with Post Malone, earning an executive producer credit on Malone's 5× Platinum Certified debut album Stoney. By 2019, Vojtesak had produced several records featured on the Billboard Hot 100 for artists including Khalid, Kodak Black, Young Thug, Chris Brown and Drake, and was featured as a Variety Hitmaker for the year. By 2020, Vojtesak was highlighted at the 20th Anniversary of the BMI R&B and Hip Hop Awards for having 5 or more credits on the Billboard Hot 100 in the year, alongside producers including Nick Mira, Tay Keith, London On Da Track, and Mike Dean, and was also named one of the "best hip-hop producers of the year" by XXL Magazine. In addition to his work in Hip-Hop and R&B, Vojtesak also works extensively in country music, producing for artists including Sam Hunt, Kane Brown, Florida Georgia Line, and Morgan Wallen, having produced on Wallen's 6× Platinum selling Dangerous: The Double Album. In 2022, Vojtesak notably co-produced the Billboard Hot 100 #1 record "First Class" and 5 other tracks on rapper Jack Harlow's second studio album "Come Home the Kids Miss You," and co-produced Morgan Wallen's "You Proof," which peaked at #1 on the Billboard Hot Country Songs chart.

== Awards and accolades ==
In 2019, Vojtesak was recognized as a "Hitmaker" by Variety for his work on Khalid's "Better" and won a BMI Pop Award for his work on Khalid and Normani's "Love Lies."

In 2020, Vojtesak was once again recognized by Variety as a "Hitmaker," this time for his work on Trevor Daniel's viral hit record "Falling" alongside producers KC Supreme and Taz Taylor. Vojtesak thereafter won another BMI Pop Award in 2020 for contributions on Khalid's "Better" and was recognized for this standout year by Music Row Magazine as #22 on their Top 100 Songwriter Charts.

In 2021, Vojtesak received a third BMI Pop award for his work on Trevor Daniel's "Falling." Later in 2021, the NMPA recognized Vojtesak's contributions on Kane Brown, Khalid, and Swae Lee's "Be Like That" as the year's Platinum Anthem (the most listened to song from July 1, 2020 – June 30, 2021). Furthermore, 2021 also saw XXL Magazine recognize Young Thug's Punk as one of the best albums of the year, which featured Vojtesak's production on 4 tracks on the album. By the end of the year, Vojtesak was once again recognized as a Music Row Top 100 Songwriter, this time landing at #48 on the list.

In 2022, Vojtesak won the Academy of Country Music Award's Album of The Year for his contributions on Morgan Wallen's "Dangerous: The Double Album." In that same year, he won a BMI Pop Award for his contributions on Kane Brown's "Be Like That," and in September, Vojtesak was named as a "Top Producer of the Year" at the BMI R&B & Hip Hop Awards alongside producers such as Kanye West and Roget Chahyed, among others. Vojtesak was also named a "Hitmaker" by Variety in 2022.

In 2023, Vojtesak earned his first Grammy nomination for Best Country Song as a songwriter and producer on Morgan Wallen's "Last Night," which topped the Billboard Hot 100 chart. Vojtesak co-wrote multiple other songs on Wallen's third studio album, One Thing at a Time, including the platinum-certified "Thinkin' Bout Me," and "You Proof," which was named Song of the Year at BMI's Country Awards. He was honored as a 2023 Variety "Hitmaker" and CMA Triple Play recipient. Vojtesak also topped in 2024, for the first time, the Hot 100 Producers chart.

== Discography ==
Complete Songwriting and Production Contributions
Year	Artist	Song	Album
2025			
2024	Kenny Chesney	Blame It on the Salt	Born
2024	Tate McRae	"Want That Too"	Think Later
2024	Post Malone, Blake Shelton	"Pour Me a Drink"	F-1 Trillion
2024	Peso Pluma, Cardi B	"PUT EM IN THE FRIDGE"	Éxodo
2024	Moneybagg Yo, Morgan Wallen	"WHISKEY WHISKEY"	SPEAK NOW
2024	Thomas Rhett	"Gone Country"	About a Woman
2024	Post Malone, Morgan Wallen	"I Had Some Help"	F-1 Trillion
2024	ERNEST	"Did It for the Story"	NASHVILLE, TENNESSEE
2024	ERNEST	"Smokin' Gun"	NASHVILLE, TENNESSEE
2024	ERNEST	"Life Goes On"	NASHVILLE, TENNESSEE
2024	ERNEST	"Small Town Goes"	NASHVILLE, TENNESSEE
2024	ERNEST	"Ain't Right Ain't Wrong"	NASHVILLE, TENNESSEE
2024	mike.	"public"	the lows.
2024	mike.	dive bar	the lows.
2024	mike.	"skylight"	the lows.
2024	mike.	"coastin (night)"	the lows.
2024	mike.	everything but sorry	the lows.
2024	mike.	catalogue cabin	the lows.
2024	mgk, Trippie Redd	"lost boys"	genre : sadboy
2024	mgk, Trippie Redd	"beauty"	genre : sadboy
2024	mgk, Trippie Redd	"suddenly"	genre : sadboy
2024	mgk, Trippie Redd	"who do i call"	genre : sadboy
2023	Nicki Minaj, Monica, Keyshia Cole	"Love Me Enough"	Pink Friday 2 (Gag City Deluxe)
2023	charlieonnafriday	"I'm Not Crazy"	Single
2023	Dylan Scott	"This Town's Been Too Good to Us"	Livin' My Best Life (Still)
2023	ERNEST	"Kiss of Death"	Single
2023	Kate Peytavin	"something's off"	big white light
2023	KSI	"Replacement"	Caught in Two Minds
2023	Lil Durk	"Cross The Globe"	Almost Healed
2023	Lil Durk	"Stand By Me"	Almost Healed
2023	Lil Towi	"Lost My Mind (Gon' Be Okay)"	Single
2023	Lil Uzi Vert	"Zoom"	Pink Tape
2023	Lil Wayne	"Kat Food"	Tha Fix Before Tha VI
2023	Machine Gun Kelly	"PRESSURE"	Single
2023	Morgan Wallen	"180 (Lifestyle)"	One Thing at a Time
2023	Morgan Wallen	"Cowgirls (feat. ERNEST)"	One Thing at a Time
2023	Morgan Wallen	"Everything I Love"	One Thing at a Time
2023	Morgan Wallen	"Good Girl Gone Missin"	One Thing at a Time
2023	Morgan Wallen	"Had It"	One Thing at a Time
2023	Morgan Wallen	"Hope That's True"	One Thing at a Time
2023	Morgan Wallen	"Last Night"	One Thing at a Time
2023	Morgan Wallen	"Me + All Your Reasons"	One Thing at a Time
2023	Morgan Wallen	"Me to Me"	One Thing at a Time
2023	Morgan Wallen	"Neon Star (Country Boy Lullaby)"	One Thing at a Time
2023	Morgan Wallen	"One Thing at a Time"	One Thing at a Time
2023	Morgan Wallen	"Single Than She Was"	One Thing at a Time
2023	Morgan Wallen	"Thinkin' Bout Me"	One Thing at a Time
2023	Morgan Wallen	"Whiskey Friends"	One Thing at a Time
2023	Oliver Tree	"The First Night"	Alone in a Crowd
2023	Quavo	Without You	Single
2022	Anitta	"Love Me, Love Me"	Versions of Me
2022	CKay	"leave me alone"	Sad Romance
2022	ERNEST	"Some Other Bar"	Single
2022	Giveon	"Lost Me"	Give or Take
2022	Gunna	"so far ahead > empire"	DS4EVER
2022	Jack Harlow	"Poison (feat. Lil Wayne)"	Come Home the Kids Miss You
2022	Jack Harlow	"I Got A Shot"	Come Home the Kids Miss You
2022	Jack Harlow	"I'd Do Anything To Make You Smile"	Come Home the Kids Miss You
2022	Jack Harlow	"Young Harleezy"	Come Home the Kids Miss You
2022	Jack Harlow	"First Class"	Come Home the Kids Miss You
2022	Juice Wrld	"Face 2 Face"	Single
2022	M.I.A.	"K.T.P. (Keep The Peace)"	Mata
2022	M.I.A.	"The One"	Single
2022	Morgan Wallen	"You Proof"	One Thing at a Time
2022	Post Malone	"Lemon Tree"	Twelve Carat Toothache
2022	Tate McRae	"don't come back"	i used to think i could fly
2022	Walker Hayes	"Delorean"	Country Stuff the Album
2022	YoungBoy Never Broke Again	"My Time"	The Last Slimeto
2021	Lil Durk	"Broadway Girls (feat. Morgan Wallen)"	7220
2021	Young Thug	"Livin' It Up (with Post Malone and ASAP Rocky"	Punk
2021	Young Thug	"Yea Yea Yea"	Punk
2021	Young Thug	"Recognize Real (with Gunna)"	Punk
2021	Young Thug	"Die Slow (with Strick)"	Punk
2021	Young Thug	"Stupid/ Asking"	Punk
2021	Khalid	"Present"	Scenic Drive (mixtape)
2021	ZAYN	"Outside"	Nobody Is Listening
2021	Rauw Alejandro	"Curame"	Vice Versa
2021	mike.	"boyfriend jeans"	the highs.
2021	mike.	"say something"	the highs.
2021	mike.	"you can tell"	the highs.
2021	mike.	"blue water"	the highs.
2021	mike.	"keep being you"	the highs.
2021	mike.	"gang"	the highs.
2021	mike.	"g.o.d"	the highs.
2021	mike.	"like blood"	the highs.
2021	mike.	"upside down"	the highs.
2021	mike.	"rodman"	the highs.
2021	mike.	"bar hoppin"	the highs.
2021	mike.	"life got crazy"	the highs.
2021	Morgan Wallen	"Heartless (with Diplo) (feat. Julia Michaels)"	Dangerous: The Double Album
2021	Morgan Wallen	"More Than My Hometown"	Dangerous: The Double Album
2021	Morgan Wallen	"Still Goin Down"	Dangerous: The Double Album
2021	Morgan Wallen	"Warning"	Dangerous: The Double Album
2021	Morgan Wallen	"Blame It on Me"	Dangerous: The Double Album
2021	Morgan Wallen	"This Bar"	Dangerous: The Double Album
2021	Morgan Wallen	"Wasted on You"	Dangerous: The Double Album
2021	Polo G	"RAPSTAR"	Hall of Fame
2020	Shy Glizzy	"Right Or Wrong (feat. Lil Uzi Vert)"	Single
2020	Murda Beatz, Polo G	"DOORS UNLOCKED (feat. Ty Dolla $ign)"	Single
2020	The Kid LAROI	"NOT FAIR (feat. Corbin)"	F*ck Love
2020	mike.	"been thinking"	Single
2020	Kane Brown, Swae Lee, Khalid	"Be Like That"	Single
2020	Juice WRLD	"Up Up and Away"	Legends Never Die
2020	Juice WRLD	"Life's A Mess (feat. Halsey)"	Legends Never Die
2020	Juice WRLD	"Righteous"	Legends Never Die
2020	Georgia Ku	"Big Plans"	REAL EP
2020	Breland	"Wifi"	Breland EP
2020	Breland	"Hot Sauce"	Breland EP
2020	mike.	"2 birds"	Single
2020	Polo G	"Beautiful Pain (Losin My Mind)"	The Goat
2020	Alec Benjamin	"Demons"	These Two Windows
2020	Lil Wayne, Big Sean, Lil Baby	"I Do It (ft. Big Sean, Lil Baby)"	Funeral
2020	Trevor Daniel, Summer Walker	"Falling (Summer Walker Remix)"	Single
2020	Florida Georgia Line	"I Love My Country"	6-Pack
2019	Khalid & Kane Brown	"Saturday Nights (REMIX)"	Single
2019	Lauren Jauregui	"More Than That"	Single
2019	Quavo	"Red Butterflies (feat. Trippie Redd)"	Single
2019	AJ Tracey	"Psych Out!"	AJ Tracey (Deluxe)
2019	Shad Da God	"Thumb Thru (feat. Gunna & Lil Duke)"	City of God
2019	Trevor Daniel	"Falling (blackbear remix)"	Single
2019	Leven Kali	"Sumwrong"	Leven Kali: Low Tide
2019	Kodak Black	"Pimpin' Ain't Eazy"	Bill Israel
2019	Melii	"Trip"	phAses
2019	Khalid	"Bluffin'"	Free Spirit
2019	Khalid	"Free Spirit"	Free Spirit
2019	Khalid	"Hundred"	Free Spirit
2019	Khalid	"Right Back"	Free Spirit
2019	Khalid	"Twenty One"	Free Spirit
2019	Khalid	"Right Back (feat. A Boogie Wit da Hoodie)"	Free Spirit
2019	Khalid	"Don't Pretend"	Free Spirit
2019	Blackbear	"Sick of It All"	Anonymous
2019	SAFE	"Control"	Stay
2019	SAFE	"Nobody Cares"	Stay
2019	SAFE	"Summer's End 2"	Stay
2019	Miley Cyrus, Swae Lee, Mike WiLL Made-It	"Party Up the Street"	She Is Coming
2019	Nessly	"Prairie Fields"	Standing on Satan's Chest
2019	Julia Michaels	"Work Too Much"	Inner Monologue, Pt 2
2019	Chance The Rapper	"Sun Come Down"	The Big Day
2019	Yung Bans, YNW Melly	"100 Shells (feat. YNW Melly)"	Misunderstood
2019	Lil Durk, A Boogie Wit da Hoodie	"U Said (feat. A Boogie Wit da Hoodie)"	Love Songs 4 the Streets 2
2019	Diplo, Morgan Wallen	"Heartless (feat. Morgan Wallen)"	Diplo presents Thomas Wesley, Chapter 1: Snake Oil
2019	Ernest	"All We Need"	Locals Only
2019	Yung Pinch	"Cross My Mind"	Back 2 the Beach
2019	Yung Pinch	"Over It (with Wiz Khalifa)"	Back 2 the Beach
2019	Morgan Wallen	"This Bar"	Single
2019	Mike Stud	"Cabo"	Uhyuready?
2019	Mike Stud	"Cheers2Tears"	Uhyuready?
2019	Mike Stud	"Nostalgia"	Uhyuready?
2019	Mike Stud	"Picture"	Uhyuready?
2019	Mike Stud	"The Mirage"	Uhyuready?
2019	Reeseynem, Chance The Rapper, Jeremih	"First Day Out"	Only on the Weekends
2018	Yung Pinch	"Sail Away"	4Everfriday Szn Two
2018	Yung Pinch	"1997"	4Everfriday Szn Two
2018	Khalid & Normani	"Love Lies"	Single
2018	RAYE, Mabel, Stefflon Don	"Cigarette"	Single
2018	Fijimacintosh	"Pain Heals and Fade Away"	Satellite Crash
2018	NAV	"Freshman List"	Reckless
2018	Tobi Lou, Smino	"Troop (feat. Smino)"	Troop
2018	The Weeknd	"Wasted Times"	My Dear Melancholy,
2018	Snakehips, Jeremih, Aminé	"For the Fuck of It (aka FTFOI for the Fuck of It)"	Single
2018	EMI	"Cheap"	Planet
2018	EMI	"Moves"	Planet
2018	EMI	"Popular"	Single
2018	Wiley, Shakka	"Certified (feat. Shakka)"	Single
2018	Young Thug, Nicki Minaj	"Anybody (feat. Nicki Minaj)"	Hear No Evil
2018	Morgan Wallen	"If I Know Me"	If I Know Me
2018	Sam Hunt	"Downtown's Dead"	Southside
2018	KYLE	"Clouds"	Light of Mine
2018	Kid Ink	"Woop Woop"	Woop Woop
2018	Lil Baby, Lil Yachty	"100 Round"	Perfect Timing
2018	Black Atlass	"Feel"	Pain & Pleasure
2018	RL Grime, 24hrs	"UCLA"	Nova
2018	Young Thug, Gunna	"Dirty Shoes (feat. Gunna)"	Slime Language
2018	Young Thug, Gunna	"Chains Choking Me (feat. Gunna)"	Slime Language
2018	Khalid	"Better"	Free Spirit
2018	Young Thug, T-Shyne	"Real in My Veins (feat. T-Shyne)"	On the Rvn
2018	Niykee Heaton	Mascara	Starting Over
2018	Trevor Daniel	Falling	Nicotine
2018	Khalid	9.13	Suncity
2018	Khalid	Motion	Suncity
2018	Khalid	Salem's Interlude	Suncity
2018	Khalid	Saturday Nights	Suncity
2018	Khalid	Vertigo	Suncity
2018	Khalid	Suncity (feat. Empress Of)	Suncity
2018	Jacob Banks	"Kumbaya (feat. Bibi Bourelly)"	Village
2018	Bobby Raps	"Be Like That"	Single
2017	Trey Songz	"93 Unreleased (aka 93 Unreleaded)"	Anticipation 3 (Mixtape)
2017	Daniel Skye	"Good as It Gets"	check date
2017	EMI	"Like Us"	Single
2017	Drake	"Madiba Riddim"	More Life
2017	Kodak Black	"Up in Here"	Painting Pictures
2017	Bliss n Eso	"Moments (feat. Gavin James)"	Off the Grid
2017	EMI	"$Quad"	Planet
2017	Young Thug	"On Fire"	Beautiful Thugger Girls
2017	Young Thug, Milie Go Lightly	"She Wanna Party (feat. Millie Go Lightly)"	Beautiful Thugger Girls
2017	Bobby Raps	"Black Ice"	MARK
2017	Bobby Raps	"Winning"	MARK
2017	Khalil	"Realized"	Prove It All
2017	A$AP Ferg, NAV	"What Do You Do"	Still Striving
2017	Kodak Black	"Up Late"	Project Baby 2
2017	Ramriddlz	"Oceans"	Sweeter Dreams
2017	Anthony Russo	"California"	Single
2017	Kodak Black	"Fuck It"	Single
2017	EMI	"1"	Single
2017	Brain, Lil Dicky	"Cocaine (feat. Lil Dicky)"	I'm Brain
2017	Brain, Lil Dicky	"On Smash (feat. Lil Dicky)"	I'm Brain
2017	SAFE	"Summers End"	STAY
2017	ALMA, French Montana	"Phases"	Single
2017	Kodak Black	"Halloween"	Single
2017	SonReal	"My Friend"	Single
2017	Nessly	"Doves Cry, Love Dies"	Still Finessin' 1.5
2017	Gunna	"Invest"	Drip or Drown
2017	Roy Woods	"Take Time (feat. 24Hrs)"	Say Less
2017	Chris Brown	"Hands Up"	Heartbreak on a Full Moon Deluxe Edition: Cuffing Season – 12 Days of Christmas
2017	Chris Brown	"I Wanna"	Heartbreak on a Full Moon Deluxe Edition: Cuffing Season – 12 Days of Christmas
2017	Chance The Rapper, Jeremih	"Held It Down"	Merry Christmas Lil' Mama
2017	Corbin	"Calm Down"	Single
2016	Khalil	"Simple"	Single
2016	Post Malone	"God Damn"	August 26
2016	Post Malone	"Never Understand (feat. Larry June)"	August 26
2016	Ariana Grande	"Step On Up"	Dangerous Woman
2016	Zuse	"I Need You"	Single
2016	A. Chal	"Far from Home"	Welcome to Gazi
2016	Young Thug	"Me or Us"	Beautiful Thugger Girls
2016	Kanye West	"Fade"	The Life of Pablo
2016	G Herbo	"Control"	Strictly 4 My Fans
2016	EMI	"Hit Me"	Single
2016	ILoveMakonnen	"Forever (feat. Santigold & 1st)"	I LOVE MAKONNEN 2
2016	Lil Dicky	"Bruh..."	Professional Rapper
2016	Lil Dicky	"Pillow Talking (feat. Brain)"	Professional Rapper
2016	Mac Miller	"Weekend (feat. Miguel)"	GO:OD AM
2016	Post Malone	"Feel (feat. Kehlani)"	Stoney
2016	Post Malone	"Go Flex"	Stoney
2016	Post Malone	"Leave"	Stoney
2016	Allan Kingdom	"Fables (feat. Chronixx)"	Northern Lights
2016	EMI	"Sip It Slow"	Single
2015	Post Malone	"TEAR$"	Single
2015	Post Malone	"Holyfield"	Single
2015	Khalil	"Future (feat. Kehlani & Justin Bieber)"	Single
2015	Lil Uzi Vert	"Moist"	Luv Is Rage
2015	Post Malone	"What's Up"	Single
2014	Travis $cott	"Drugs You Should Try It"	Days Before Rodeo
2014	Rittz	"Bounce (feat. Twista)"	Next to Nothing
2014	Rittz	"Turn Down"	Next to Nothing
2014	Jessie J	"Keep Us Together"	Sweet Talker
