= Larry Fleet =

American singer-songwriter

- Origin: White Bluff, Tennessee, U.S.
- Genres: Country
- Occupation: Singer-songwriter
- Instruments: Vocals, guitar
- Years active: 2017–present
- Labels: Big Loud

Larry Fleet is an American country music singer-songwriter. Signed to Big Loud in 2019, he has released three albums and three singles.

== Biography ==
Larry Fleet was born and raised in White Bluff, Tennessee. His great grandfather and great-uncle had a bluegrass band called the Happy Two. He joined them when he was six years old. His great-uncle taught him how to play guitar and fiddle.

Throughout 2009 and 2010, Fleet played almost every Friday night at The Wet Bar in Dickson, Tennessee, as well as at a bar called Evolutions. It was in these two venues that Fleet really developed and matured as an artist. Later, he chose to move to Nashville in pursuit of a country music career. In 2017, country singer Jake Owen discovered Fleet performing cover songs at a wedding, and booked him as an opening act. Fleet also competed on Real Country, a singing competition on the USA Network where Owen serves as a judge. Fleet placed second on the show, which led to him recording a number of independent releases prior to signing with Big Loud. He officially signed with the label in October 2019.

Fleet co-wrote his debut single "Where I Find God" with Nashville-based songwriter Connie Harrington. She had discovered Fleet through his social media accounts, where he would post a cover of a gospel song every Sunday. Harrington expressed interest in writing a song with him, and the two wrote it after she presented him with the title. "Where I Find God" entered the Billboard Country Airplay charts at number 58 for the chart dated October 17, 2020. The song would peak at number 43 on the chart dated July 10, 2021.

== Discography ==
=== Studio albums ===
- Workin' Hard (2019)
- Stack of Records (2021)
- Earned It (2023)
- Another Year Older (2026)

=== Singles ===
Year	Title	Peak chart positions
Year	Title	US Country Airplay
2021	"Where I Find God"	43
2024	"Things I Take for Granted"	59
