= Thinkin' Bout Me =

2023 song by Morgan Wallen

Single by Morgan Wallen

from the album One Thing at a Time
- Released: September 7, 2023
- Genre: Country pop; country trap
- Length: 2:57
- Label: Big Loud; Republic; Mercury
- Songwriters: John Byron; Ashley Gorley; Taylor Phillips; Ryan Vojtesak
- Producers: Charlie Handsome; Joey Moi

Morgan Wallen singles chronology
"Stand by Me" (2023)	"Thinkin' Bout Me" (2023)	"Mamaw's House" (2023)

Lyric video
- "Thinkin' Bout Me" on YouTube

"Thinkin' Bout Me" is a song by American country music singer Morgan Wallen. It was released on September 7, 2023, as the sixth single from his third studio album One Thing at a Time. It was written by John Byron, Ashley Gorley, Taylor Phillips and Charlie Handsome, who also produced the song with Joey Moi.

== Charts ==
=== Weekly charts ===
Weekly chart performance for "Thinkin' Bout Me"
Chart (2023–2024)	Peak position
Australia (ARIA)	35
Canada Hot 100 (Billboard)	13
Canada Country (Billboard)	1
Global 200 (Billboard)	21
Ireland (IRMA)	54
New Zealand Hot Singles (RMNZ)	7
US Billboard Hot 100	7
US Adult Pop Airplay (Billboard)	20
US Country Airplay (Billboard)	1
US Hot Country Songs (Billboard)	3
US Pop Airplay (Billboard)	22

=== Year-end charts ===
2023 year-end chart performance for "Thinkin' Bout Me"
Chart (2023)	Position
Canada (Canadian Hot 100)	31
Global 200 (Billboard)	106
US Billboard Hot 100	19
US Country Airplay (Billboard)	54
US Hot Country Songs (Billboard)	6

2024 year-end chart performance for "Thinkin' Bout Me"
Chart (2024)	Position
Australia (ARIA)	45
Global 200 (Billboard)	92
US Billboard Hot 100	31
US Country Airplay (Billboard)	18
US Hot Country Songs (Billboard)	7

== Certifications ==
Certifications for "Thinkin' Bout Me"
Region	Certification	Certified units/sales
Australia (ARIA)	Platinum	70,000^{‡}
Canada (Music Canada)	9× Platinum	720,000^{‡}
New Zealand (RMNZ)	3× Platinum	90,000^{‡}
United Kingdom (BPI)	Gold	400,000^{‡}
United States (RIAA)	7× Platinum	7,000,000^{‡}
^{‡} Sales+streaming figures based on certification alone.
