= Last Night (Morgan Wallen song) =

Single by Morgan Wallen

from the album One Thing at a Time
- Released: January 31, 2023
- Genre: Country pop; hick-hop; R&B
- Length: 2:43
- Label: Big Loud; Republic; Mercury
- Songwriters: John Byron; Ashley Gorley; Jacob Kasher Hindlin; Ryan Vojtesak
- Producers: Joey Moi; Charlie Handsome

Morgan Wallen singles chronology
"Thought You Should Know" (2022)	"Last Night" (2023)	"One Thing at a Time" (2023)

Lyric video
- "Last Night" on YouTube

"Last Night" is a song written by John Byron, Ashley Gorley, Jacob Kasher Hindlin, and Ryan Vojtesak. It was recorded by American country music singer Morgan Wallen, the third single from his 2023 album One Thing at a Time. The song peaked at number one on the Billboard Hot Country Songs in February 2023.

For the week ending March 18, 2023, "Last Night" reached the top of the Billboard Hot 100, a first for Wallen. The last country song to reach the top spot was "All Too Well (10 Minute Version) (Taylor's Version) (From the Vault)" by Taylor Swift in 2021, and the last time a solo male artist did so was in 1981, with the song "I Love a Rainy Night" by Eddie Rabbitt. It spent 16 non-consecutive weeks at the top, the second most for a non-collaboration and tied for the third most of all time. According to Billboard, the song was the number one single for 2023, the third such single to have also hit number one on the Billboard country chart since 1959. The song was nominated for Best Country Song at the 66th Grammy Awards.

== Chart performance ==
The song peaked at number one on the Billboard Hot Country Songs charts dated February 13, 2023, ascending from a debut position of number seven one week prior. The same week, Wallen's prior singles "Thought You Should Know" and "You Proof" claimed the number two and three positions, while "I Wrote the Book" was at number 10.

Following the release of One Thing at a Time, "Last Night" ascended from number five to one on the Billboard Hot 100 dated March 18, 2023, becoming Wallen's first number one on the chart. The song achieved 47.5 million streams, 18,000 digital downloads sold, and a 10.8 million airplay audience. The same week, Wallen occupied 36 places on the Hot 100, the most of any artist, as well as five of the top 10 on the Hot 100. "Last Night" is also the first country song by a solo male to top the Hot 100 in over 42 years, following "I Love a Rainy Night" by Eddie Rabbitt (1981), and the first country song to top the chart since "All Too Well (10 Minute Version) (Taylor's Version) (From the Vault)" by Taylor Swift in November 2021. On the chart dated August 5, 2023, "Last Night" sat at number two between Jason Aldean's "Try That in a Small Town" and Luke Combs's "Fast Car" at numbers one and three, respectively, making it the first time in the Hot 100's history that the top three positions were all occupied by country artists. On the chart dated August 19, 2023, "Last Night" topped the Hot 100 for a 16th non-consecutive week, surpassing "As It Was" by Harry Styles as the longest running number one by a solo artist with no accompanying acts, as well as tying for the second longest run of all time. To date, it is the only single to have peaked at number one on the Billboard Hot 100 during six consecutive months.

In July 2023, "Last Night" became the first song to accrue one billion on-demand streams in the United States in a single year. On December 16, 2025, it was certified 12× Platinum by RIAA.

== Charts ==
=== Weekly charts ===
Weekly chart performance
Chart (2023–2024)	Peak position
Australia (ARIA)	1
Australia Country Hot 50 (The Music Network)	1
Canada Hot 100 (Billboard)	1
Canada CHR/Top 40 (Billboard)	30
Canada Country (Billboard)	1
Canada Hot AC (Billboard)	14
Global 200 (Billboard)	5
Ireland (IRMA)	7
Japan Hot Overseas (Billboard Japan)	17
New Zealand (Recorded Music NZ)	2
Sweden (Sverigetopplistan)	79
UK Singles (Official Charts)	28
US Billboard Hot 100	1
US Adult Contemporary (Billboard)	13
US Adult Pop Airplay (Billboard)	5
US Country Airplay (Billboard)	1
US Hot Country Songs (Billboard)	1
US Pop Airplay (Billboard)	5

=== Year-end charts ===
Year-end chart performance
Chart (2023)	Position
Australia (ARIA)	2
Canada (Canadian Hot 100)	3
Global 200 (Billboard)	10
New Zealand (Recorded Music NZ)	6
US Billboard Hot 100	1
US Adult Contemporary (Billboard)	27
US Adult Top 40 (Billboard)	15
US Country Airplay (Billboard)	1
US Hot Country Songs (Billboard)	1
US Mainstream Top 40 (Billboard)	17

Year-end chart performance
Chart (2024)	Position
Australia (ARIA)	25
Canada (Canadian Hot 100)	23
Global 200 (Billboard)	39
New Zealand (Recorded Music NZ)	37
US Billboard Hot 100	28
US Hot Country Songs (Billboard)	5

== Certifications ==
Certifications
Region	Certification	Certified units/sales
Australia (ARIA)	11× Platinum	770,000^{‡}
Brazil (Pro-Música Brasil)	Gold	20,000^{‡}
Canada (Music Canada)	Diamond	800,000^{‡}
New Zealand (RMNZ)	6× Platinum	180,000^{‡}
United Kingdom (BPI)	Platinum	600,000^{‡}
United States (RIAA)	12× Platinum	12,000,000^{‡}
Streaming
Sweden (GLF)	Platinum	12,000,000^{†}
^{‡} Sales+streaming figures based on certification alone.^{†} Streaming-only figures based on certification alone.

== See also ==
- List of highest-certified singles in Australia
