= Everything I Love (Morgan Wallen song) =

Single by Morgan Wallen

from the album One Thing at a Time
- Released: June 26, 2023
- Genre: Country rock; Southern rock
- Length: 3:05
- Label: Big Loud; Republic; Mercury
- Songwriters: Morgan Wallen; Ernest Keith Smith; Ryan Vojtesak; Gregg Allman; Robert Kim Payne
- Producer: Joey Moi

Morgan Wallen singles chronology
"One Thing at a Time" (2023)	"Everything I Love" (2023)	"Stand by Me" (2023)

Lyric video
- "Everything I Love" on YouTube

"Everything I Love" is a song co-written and recorded by American country music singer Morgan Wallen. It was released on June 26, 2023, as the fifth single from his third studio album One Thing at a Time.

== Content ==
Taste of Country writer Carena Liptak referred to the song as "a heartbreak ballad with honky-tonk leanings, and plenty of references to trucks, whiskey and back roads".

Wallen co-wrote the song with Ernest Keith Smith, Charlie Handsome (credited as Ryan Vojtesak), and Ashley Gorley. As the song also contains an interpolation of "Midnight Rider" by the Allman Brothers Band, that song's co-writers Gregg Allman and Robert Kim Payne are also credited as co-writers.

== Charts ==
=== Weekly charts ===
Weekly chart performance for "Everything I Love"
Chart (2023)	Peak position
Canada Hot 100 (Billboard)	15
Canada Country (Billboard)	1
Global 200 (Billboard)	34
US Billboard Hot 100	14
US Country Airplay (Billboard)	3
US Hot Country Songs (Billboard)	7

=== Year-end charts ===
2023 year-end chart performance for "Everything I Love"
Chart (2023)	Position
Canada (Canadian Hot 100)	75
US Billboard Hot 100	56
US Country Airplay (Billboard)	48
US Hot Country Songs (Billboard)	13

2024 year-end chart performance for "Everything I Love"
Chart (2024)	Position
US Country Airplay (Billboard)	51
US Hot Country Songs (Billboard)	81

== Certifications ==
Region	Certification	Certified units/sales
Australia (ARIA)	Gold	35,000^{‡}
United States (RIAA)	2× Platinum	2,000,000^{‡}
^{‡} Sales+streaming figures based on certification alone.
