= Thought You Should Know (Morgan Wallen song) =

2022 song by Morgan Wallen

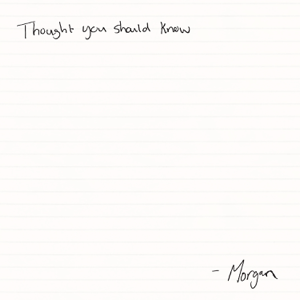

Single by Morgan Wallen

from the album One Thing at a Time
- Released: November 7, 2022
- Genre: Country
- Length: 3:35
- Label: Big Loud; Republic; Mercury
- Songwriters: Morgan Wallen; Miranda Lambert; Nicolle Galyon
- Producer: Joey Moi

Morgan Wallen singles chronology
"You Proof" (2022)	"Thought You Should Know" (2022)	"Last Night" (2023)

Music video
- "Thought You Should Know" on YouTube

"Thought You Should Know" is a song by American country music singer Morgan Wallen. It was released as a promotional single on May 6, 2022, and officially sent to country radio on November 7, 2022. It is the second single from Wallen's third studio album One Thing at a Time.

== Content ==
Wallen co-wrote "Thought You Should Know" as a tribute to his mother, Lesli. He co-wrote the song with Miranda Lambert and Nicolle Galyon. The accompaniment features pedal steel guitar and acoustic guitar.

== Chart performance ==
"Thought You Should Know" debuted at number one on the Billboard Hot Country Songs chart dated for May 21, 2022. The song is Wallen's fourth to debut at the top of that chart. Additionally, it replaced Wallen's "Wasted on You" at the top, making him the first artist to replace himself at the top with a number one debut. It entered the top 10 on the Billboard Country Airplay chart dated December 31, 2022, at the same time that Wallen's previous single "You Proof" was at number one. On December 16, 2025, it was certified 6× Platinum by RIAA.

== Charts ==
=== Weekly charts ===
Weekly chart performance for "Thought You Should Know"
Chart (2022–2023)	Peak position
Australia (ARIA)	85
Canada Hot 100 (Billboard)	14
Canada Country (Billboard)	2
Global 200 (Billboard)	32
New Zealand Hot Singles (RMNZ)	18
US Billboard Hot 100	7
US Country Airplay (Billboard)	1
US Hot Country Songs (Billboard)	1

=== Year-end charts ===
2022 year-end chart performance for "Thought You Should Know"
Chart (2022)	Position
US Digital Song Sales (Billboard)	75
US Hot Country Songs (Billboard)	36

2023 year-end chart performance for "Thought You Should Know"
Chart (2023)	Position
Canada (Canadian Hot 100)	53
US Billboard Hot 100	22
US Country Airplay (Billboard)	6
US Hot Country Songs (Billboard)	9

== Certifications ==
Certifications for "Thought You Should Know"
Region	Certification	Certified units/sales
Australia (ARIA)	Platinum	70,000^{‡}
Canada (Music Canada)	6× Platinum	480,000^{‡}
New Zealand (RMNZ)	Gold	15,000^{‡}
United Kingdom (BPI)	Silver	200,000^{‡}
United States (RIAA)	6× Platinum	6,000,000^{‡}
^{‡} Sales+streaming figures based on certification alone.

== Release history ==
Release dates and formats for "Thought You Should Know"
Region	Date	Format(s)	Label(s)	Ref.
United States	May 6, 2022 (Note: Release as a promotional single)	Digital download; streaming	Big Loud; Republic; Mercury	
United States	November 7, 2022	Country radio	Big Loud; Republic	
