= You Proof =

2022 song by Morgan Wallen

Single by Morgan Wallen

from the album One Thing at a Time
- Released: July 18, 2022
- Genre: Pop; country pop; trap
- Length: 2:37
- Label: Big Loud; Republic; Mercury
- Songwriters: Morgan Wallen; Ryan Vojtesak; Ashley Gorley; Ernest Keith Smith
- Producers: Joey Moi; Charlie Handsome

Morgan Wallen singles chronology
"Wasted on You" (2022)	"You Proof" (2022)	"Thought You Should Know" (2022)

Music video
- "You Proof" on YouTube

"You Proof" is a song by American country music singer Morgan Wallen. It was released as a promotional single on May 13, 2022, before being released to country radio on July 18, 2022. The song was written by Wallen, along with Ashley Gorley, Ernest Keith Smith, and Ryan Vojtesak and is the lead single from Wallen's third studio album One Thing at a Time.

== Content ==
The song is about "drinking away the memory of a previous lover". Its main instrument is acoustic guitar.

Wallen released it to honor his 29th birthday.

The song was then featured on season one, episode six, of the CBS series, Fire Country, which first aired on November 18, 2022.

== Chart performance ==
"You Proof" debuted at number one on the Billboard Hot Country Songs chart for May 23, 2022, replacing Wallen's own "Wasted on You". It is Wallen's fifth single to debut at the top of that chart. It also peaked at number five on the Billboard Hot 100 becoming his highest charting song on the chart at the time, surpassing "7 Summers", which peaked at number six. It spent five consecutive weeks at number one on Country Airplay starting with the chart dated October 15, 2022, before falling to number two and being dethroned at the top by Tyler Hubbard's "5 Foot 9" on November 19. The following week, it remained at number two, having been leapfrogged by Thomas Rhett and Riley Green's "Half of Me". On the chart dated December 3, "You Proof" returned to number one for a sixth week before being dethroned again the following week by Bailey Zimmerman's "Fall in Love". On the chart dated December 17, it again returned to the top for four additional weeks. The song ultimately spent a total of ten non-consecutive weeks at number one. With its time at number one on Country Airplay spanning three separate runs, the song became the first in that chart's history to rebound to the top after multiple songs reached number one in between. In addition, the song's ten-week run atop the Country Airplay chart set a new record for the longest-running number one single in that chart's history, surpassing Lonestar's "Amazed" (1999) and Alan Jackson and Jimmy Buffett's "It's Five O'Clock Somewhere" (2003), which each spent eight weeks at the top. This record would later be tied in February 2024 by Nate Smith's "World on Fire". On August 3, 2026, it was certified Diamond by RIAA.

== Music video ==
Morgan Wallen jumps out of his car and runs away from a pursuing car.

The music video directed by Justin Clough, produced by Taylor Vermillion, and filmed in Humphreys County, Tennessee, it was released on September 9, 2022. It expresses a loss at the attempt to fade the memory of a past lover. The video shows a former love interest, performed by Charlie Jordan, jumping into Wallen's car in a liquor store parking lot and drives recklessly through town and down a back road with Wallen in the backseat. Wallen jumps out of the car, only to realize he had been hallucinating.

== Charts ==
=== Weekly charts ===
Weekly chart performance for "You Proof"
Chart (2022–2024)	Peak position
Australia (ARIA)	20
Canada Hot 100 (Billboard)	9
Canada Country (Billboard)	1
Global 200 (Billboard)	22
Ireland (IRMA)	96
New Zealand (Recorded Music NZ)	37
US Billboard Hot 100	5
US Country Airplay (Billboard)	1
US Hot Country Songs (Billboard)	1

=== Year-end charts ===
2022 year-end chart performance for "You Proof"
Chart (2022)	Position
Canada (Canadian Hot 100)	45
Global 200 (Billboard)	135
US Billboard Hot 100	27
US Country Airplay (Billboard)	13
US Hot Country Songs (Billboard)	2

2023 year-end chart performance for "You Proof"
Chart (2023)	Position
Australia (ARIA)	41
Global 200 (Billboard)	71
US Billboard Hot 100	12
US Country Airplay (Billboard)	33
US Hot Country Songs (Billboard)	3

== Certifications ==
Certifications for "You Proof"
Region	Certification	Certified units/sales
Australia (ARIA)	3× Platinum	210,000^{‡}
Canada (Music Canada)	Diamond	800,000^{‡}
New Zealand (RMNZ)	Platinum	30,000^{‡}
United Kingdom (BPI)	Silver	200,000^{‡}
United States (RIAA)	Diamond	10,000,000^{‡}
^{‡} Sales+streaming figures based on certification alone.

== Release history ==
Release dates and formats for "You Proof"
Region	Date	Format(s)	Label(s)	Ref.
United States	May 17, 2022 (Note: Release as a promotional single)	Digital download; streaming	Big Loud; Republic; Mercury	
United States	July 18, 2022	Country radio	Big Loud; Republic	
