= List of number-one R&B/hip-hop songs of 2023 (U.S.) =

This page lists the songs that reached number-one on the overall Hot R&B/Hip-Hop Songs chart, the R&B Songs chart, and the Hot Rap Songs chart in 2023. The R&B Songs and Rap Songs charts partly serve as distillations of the overall R&B/Hip-Hop Songs chart.

== Chart history ==
Key
†	Indicates best-performing song of 2023

Issue date	R&B/Hip-Hop Songs	Artist	R&B Songs	Artist	Rap Songs	Artist	R&B/Hip-Hop Airplay	Artist	Refs.
January 7	"Kill Bill" †	SZA	"Kill Bill" †	SZA	"Rich Flex" †	Drake and 21 Savage	"Tomorrow 2"	GloRilla and Cardi B	
January 14	"Kill Bill" †	SZA	"Kill Bill" †	SZA	"Rich Flex" †	Drake and 21 Savage	"Tomorrow 2"	GloRilla and Cardi B	
January 21	"Kill Bill" †	SZA	"Kill Bill" †	SZA	"Rich Flex" †	Drake and 21 Savage	"Tomorrow 2"	GloRilla and Cardi B	
January 28	"Kill Bill" †	SZA	"Kill Bill" †	SZA	"Rich Flex" †	Drake and 21 Savage	"Rich Flex"	Drake and 21 Savage	
February 4	"Kill Bill" †	SZA	"Kill Bill" †	SZA	"Rich Flex" †	Drake and 21 Savage	"Rich Flex"	Drake and 21 Savage	
February 11	"Kill Bill" †	SZA	"Kill Bill" †	SZA	"Rich Flex" †	Drake and 21 Savage	"Free Mind" †	Tems	
February 18	"Kill Bill" †	SZA	"Kill Bill" †	SZA	"Rich Flex" †	Drake and 21 Savage	"Free Mind" †	Tems	
February 25	"Kill Bill" †	SZA	"Kill Bill" †	SZA	"Just Wanna Rock"	Lil Uzi Vert	"Free Mind" †	Tems	
March 4	"Kill Bill" †	SZA	"Kill Bill" †	SZA	"Just Wanna Rock"	Lil Uzi Vert	"Free Mind" †	Tems	
March 11	"Die for You"	The Weeknd and Ariana Grande	"Die for You"	The Weeknd and Ariana Grande	"Just Wanna Rock"	Lil Uzi Vert	"Free Mind" †	Tems	
March 18	"Kill Bill" †	SZA	"Kill Bill" †	SZA	"Red Ruby da Sleeze"	Nicki Minaj	"Free Mind" †	Tems	
March 25	"Kill Bill" †	SZA	"Kill Bill" †	SZA	"Players"	Coi Leray	"Under the Influence"	Chris Brown	
April 1	"Kill Bill" †	SZA	"Kill Bill" †	SZA	"Players"	Coi Leray	"Under the Influence"	Chris Brown	
April 8	"Kill Bill" †	SZA	"Kill Bill" †	SZA	"Players"	Coi Leray	"Free Mind" †	Tems	
April 15	"Kill Bill" †	SZA	"Kill Bill" †	SZA	"Players"	Coi Leray	"Free Mind" †	Tems	
April 22	"Search & Rescue"	Drake	"Kill Bill" †	SZA	"Search & Rescue"	Drake	"Free Mind" †	Tems	
April 29	"Kill Bill" †	SZA	"Kill Bill" †	SZA	"Princess Diana"	Ice Spice and Nicki Minaj	"Free Mind" †	Tems	
May 6	"Kill Bill" †	SZA	"Kill Bill" †	SZA	"Search & Rescue"	Drake	"Free Mind" †	Tems	
May 13	"Kill Bill" †	SZA	"Kill Bill" †	SZA	"Favorite Song"	Toosii	"Free Mind" †	Tems	
May 20	"Kill Bill" †	SZA	"Kill Bill" †	SZA	"Favorite Song"	Toosii	"Free Mind" †	Tems	
May 27	"All My Life"	Lil Durk featuring J. Cole	"Kill Bill" †	SZA	"All My Life"	Lil Durk featuring J Cole	"Free Mind" †	Tems	
June 3	"Kill Bill" †	SZA	"Kill Bill" †	SZA	"Favorite Song"	Toosii	"Free Mind" †	Tems	
June 10	"All My Life"	Lil Durk featuring J. Cole	"Kill Bill" †	SZA	"All My Life"	Lil Durk featuring J. Cole	"Free Mind" †	Tems	
June 17	"All My Life"	Lil Durk featuring J. Cole	"Kill Bill" †	SZA	"All My Life"	Lil Durk featuring J. Cole	"Free Mind" †	Tems	
June 24	"All My Life"	Lil Durk featuring J. Cole	"Kill Bill" †	SZA	"All My Life"	Lil Durk featuring J. Cole	"Free Mind" †	Tems	
July 1	"All My Life"	Lil Durk featuring J. Cole	"Kill Bill" †	SZA	"All My Life"	Lil Durk featuring J. Cole	"Snooze"	SZA	
July 8	"All My Life"	Lil Durk featuring J. Cole	"Kill Bill" †	SZA	"All My Life"	Lil Durk featuring J. Cole	"Snooze"	SZA	
July 15	"All My Life"	Lil Durk featuring J. Cole	"Kill Bill" †	SZA	"All My Life"	Lil Durk featuring J. Cole	"Snooze"	SZA	
July 22	"FukUMean"	Gunna	"Kill Bill" †	SZA	"FukUMean"	Gunna	"Snooze"	SZA	
July 29	"FukUMean"	Gunna	"Snooze"	SZA	"FukUMean"	Gunna	"Snooze"	SZA	
August 5	"FukUMean"	Gunna	"Snooze"	SZA	"FukUMean"	Gunna	"Snooze"	SZA	
August 12	"Meltdown"	Travis Scott featuring Drake	"Snooze"	SZA	"Meltdown"	Travis Scott featuring Drake	"Snooze"	SZA	
August 19	"FukUMean"	Gunna	"Snooze"	SZA	"FukUMean"	Gunna	"Snooze"	SZA	
August 26	"FukUMean"	Gunna	"Snooze"	SZA	"FukUMean"	Gunna	"Snooze"	SZA	
September 2	"Paint the Town Red"	Doja Cat	"Snooze"	SZA	"Paint the Town Red"	Doja Cat	"Snooze"	SZA	
September 9	"Paint the Town Red"	Doja Cat	"Snooze"	SZA	"Paint the Town Red"	Doja Cat	"Snooze"	SZA	
September 16	"Paint the Town Red"	Doja Cat	"Snooze"	SZA	"Paint the Town Red"	Doja Cat	"Snooze"	SZA	
September 23	"Paint the Town Red"	Doja Cat	"Snooze"	SZA	"Paint the Town Red"	Doja Cat	"Snooze"	SZA	
September 30	"Slime You Out"	Drake featuring SZA	"Slime You Out"	Drake featuring SZA	"Paint the Town Red"	Doja Cat	"Snooze"	SZA	
October 7	"Paint the Town Red"	Doja Cat	"Snooze"	SZA	"Paint the Town Red"	Doja Cat	"Snooze"	SZA	
October 14	"Paint the Town Red"	Doja Cat	"Snooze"	SZA	"Paint the Town Red"	Doja Cat	"Snooze"	SZA	
October 21	"First Person Shooter"	Drake featuring J. Cole	"Slime You Out"	Drake featuring SZA	"First Person Shooter"	Drake featuring J. Cole	"Snooze"	SZA	
October 28	"Paint the Town Red"	Doja Cat	"Snooze"	SZA	"Paint the Town Red"	Doja Cat	"Snooze"	SZA	
November 4	"Paint the Town Red"	Doja Cat	"Snooze"	SZA	"Paint the Town Red"	Doja Cat	"Good Good"	Usher, Summer Walker and 21 Savage	
November 11	"Paint the Town Red"	Doja Cat	"Snooze"	SZA	"Paint the Town Red"	Doja Cat	"Good Good"	Usher, Summer Walker and 21 Savage	
November 18	"Paint the Town Red"	Doja Cat	"Snooze"	SZA	"Paint the Town Red"	Doja Cat	"Snooze"	SZA	
November 25	"Lovin on Me"	Jack Harlow	"Snooze"	SZA	"Lovin on Me"	Jack Harlow	"Snooze"	SZA	
December 2	"Lovin on Me"	Jack Harlow	"Snooze"	SZA	"Lovin on Me"	Jack Harlow	"Snooze"	SZA	
December 9	"Lovin on Me"	Jack Harlow	"Snooze"	SZA	"Lovin on Me"	Jack Harlow	"On My Mama"	Victoria Monét	
December 16	"Lovin on Me"	Jack Harlow	"Snooze"	SZA	"Lovin on Me"	Jack Harlow	"On My Mama"	Victoria Monét	
December 23	"Lovin on Me"	Jack Harlow	"Snooze"	SZA	"Lovin on Me"	Jack Harlow	"Snooze"	SZA	
December 30	"Lovin on Me"	Jack Harlow	"Snooze"	SZA	"Lovin on Me"	Jack Harlow	"Snooze"	SZA	

== See also ==
- 2023 in American music
- 2023 in hip hop music
- List of Billboard Hot 100 number-one singles of 2023
- List of Billboard number-one R&B/hip-hop albums of 2023
- Billboard Year-End Hot R&B/Hip-Hop Songs of 2023
