= List of Billboard Global 200 number ones of 2023 =

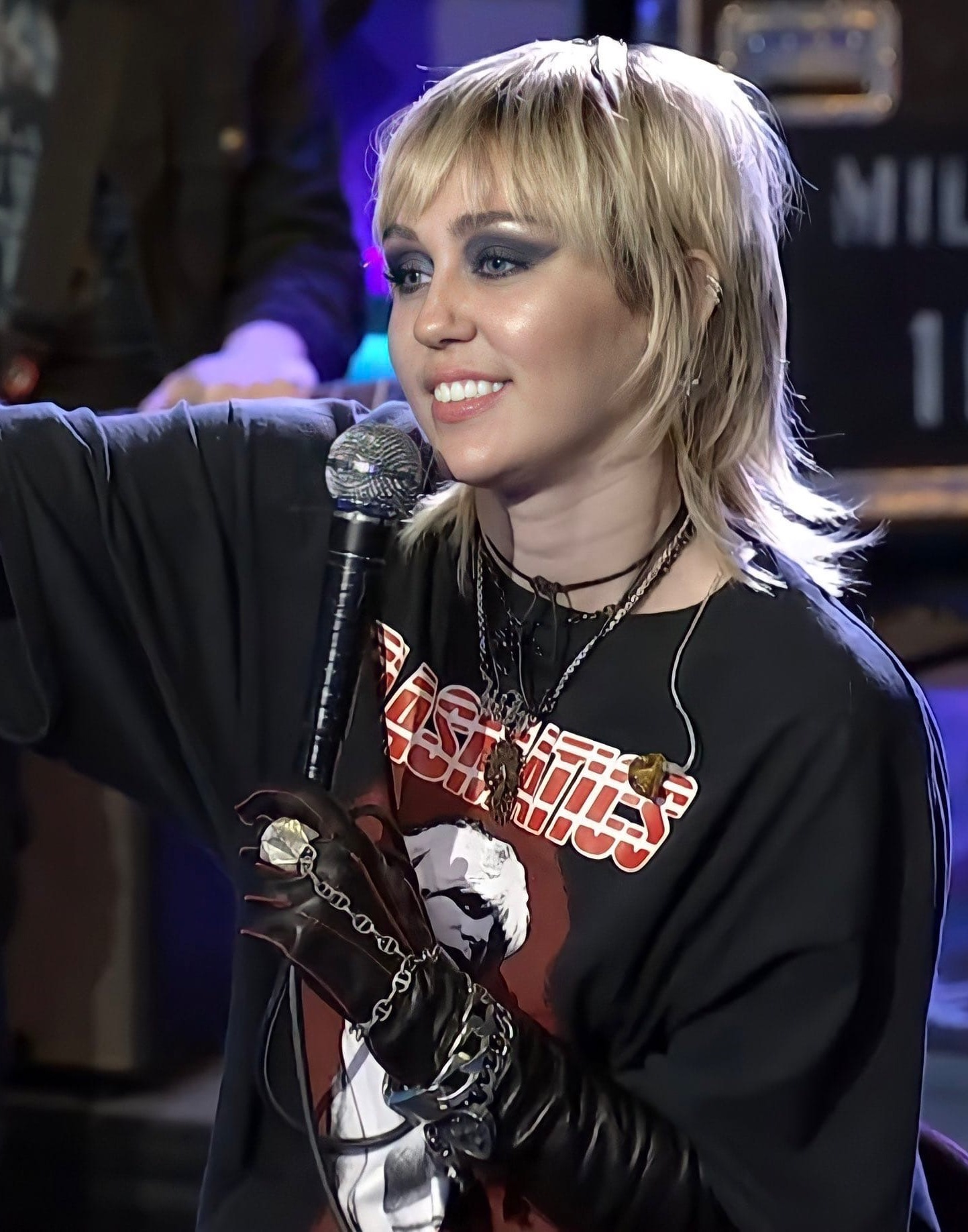
"Flowers" by Miley Cyrus is the year's longest running number-one song, topping the Global 200 and the Global Excl. US for 13 weeks.

The Billboard Global 200 is a chart that ranks the best-performing songs globally. Its data, published by Billboard magazine and compiled by Luminate, is based on digital sales and online streaming from over 200 territories worldwide. Another similar chart is the Billboard Global Excl. US chart, which follows the same formula except it covers all territories excluding the US. The two charts launched on September 19, 2020.

On the Global 200, eighteen singles reached number one in 2023. Thirteen artists reached the top of the chart for the first time—SZA, Miley Cyrus, Karol G, Shakira, Eslabon Armado, Peso Pluma, Grupo Frontera, Jung Kook, Latto, Doja Cat, Jack Harlow, Yeat, and Tate McRae. Miley Cyrus spent the most weeks at the top spot with thirteen weeks at number one for her single "Flowers".

On the Global Excl. US, nineteen singles reached number one in 2023. Seventeen artists reached the top of the chart for the first time—Rema, Selena Gomez, Miley Cyrus, Karol G, Shakira, Grupo Frontera, Fifty Fifty, Yoasobi, Peso Pluma, Myke Towers, Jung Kook, Latto, Doja Cat, Jack Harlow, Jennie, Íñigo Quintero, and Tate McRae. Miley Cyrus spent the most weeks at the top spot with thirteen weeks at number one for her single "Flowers".

== Chart history ==
Key
†	Indicates best-performing song of 2023 on the Global 200
‡	Indicates best-performing song of 2023 on the Global Excl. US

Issue date	Billboard Global 200		Billboard Global Excl. US		Ref.
Issue date	Song	Artist(s)	Song	Artist(s)	Ref.
January 7	"All I Want for Christmas Is You"	Mariah Carey	"All I Want for Christmas Is You"	Mariah Carey	
January 14	"Kill Bill"	SZA	"Calm Down"	Rema and Selena Gomez	
January 21	"Kill Bill"	SZA	"Calm Down"	Rema and Selena Gomez	
January 28	"Flowers" †	Miley Cyrus	"Flowers" ‡	Miley Cyrus	
February 4	"Flowers" †	Miley Cyrus	"Flowers" ‡	Miley Cyrus	
February 11	"Flowers" †	Miley Cyrus	"Flowers" ‡	Miley Cyrus	
February 18	"Flowers" †	Miley Cyrus	"Flowers" ‡	Miley Cyrus	
February 25	"Flowers" †	Miley Cyrus	"Flowers" ‡	Miley Cyrus	
March 4	"Flowers" †	Miley Cyrus	"Flowers" ‡	Miley Cyrus	
March 11	"TQG"	Karol G and Shakira	"TQG"	Karol G and Shakira	
March 18	"Flowers" †	Miley Cyrus	"Flowers" ‡	Miley Cyrus	
March 25	"Flowers" †	Miley Cyrus	"Flowers" ‡	Miley Cyrus	
April 1	"Flowers" †	Miley Cyrus	"Flowers" ‡	Miley Cyrus	
April 8	"Flowers" †	Miley Cyrus	"Flowers" ‡	Miley Cyrus	
April 15	"Flowers" †	Miley Cyrus	"Flowers" ‡	Miley Cyrus	
April 22	"Flowers" †	Miley Cyrus	"Flowers" ‡	Miley Cyrus	
April 29	"Ella Baila Sola"	Eslabon Armado and Peso Pluma	"Flowers" ‡	Miley Cyrus	
May 6	"Un x100to"	Grupo Frontera and Bad Bunny	"Un x100to"	Grupo Frontera and Bad Bunny	
May 13	"Un x100to"	Grupo Frontera and Bad Bunny	"Un x100to"	Grupo Frontera and Bad Bunny	
May 20	"Ella Baila Sola"	Eslabon Armado and Peso Pluma	"Un x100to"	Grupo Frontera and Bad Bunny	
May 27	"Ella Baila Sola"	Eslabon Armado and Peso Pluma	"Cupid"	Fifty Fifty	
June 3	"Where She Goes"	Bad Bunny	"Cupid"	Fifty Fifty	
June 10	"Ella Baila Sola"	Eslabon Armado and Peso Pluma	"Idol"	Yoasobi	
June 17	"Ella Baila Sola"	Eslabon Armado and Peso Pluma	"Bzrp Music Sessions, Vol. 55"	Bizarrap and Peso Pluma	
June 24	"Take Two"	BTS	"Take Two"	BTS	
July 1	"Ella Baila Sola"	Eslabon Armado and Peso Pluma	"Idol"	Yoasobi	
July 8	"Flowers" †	Miley Cyrus	"Idol"	Yoasobi	
July 15	"Vampire"	Olivia Rodrigo	"Vampire"	Olivia Rodrigo	
July 22	"Vampire"	Olivia Rodrigo	"LaLa"	Myke Towers	
July 29	"Seven"	Jung Kook featuring Latto	"Seven"	Jung Kook featuring Latto	
August 5	"Seven"	Jung Kook featuring Latto	"Seven"	Jung Kook featuring Latto	
August 12	"Seven"	Jung Kook featuring Latto	"Seven"	Jung Kook featuring Latto	
August 19	"Seven"	Jung Kook featuring Latto	"Seven"	Jung Kook featuring Latto	
August 26	"Seven"	Jung Kook featuring Latto	"Seven"	Jung Kook featuring Latto	
September 2	"Seven"	Jung Kook featuring Latto	"Seven"	Jung Kook featuring Latto	
September 9	"Seven"	Jung Kook featuring Latto	"Seven"	Jung Kook featuring Latto	
September 16	"Paint the Town Red"	Doja Cat	"Seven"	Jung Kook featuring Latto	
September 23	"Paint the Town Red"	Doja Cat	"Seven"	Jung Kook featuring Latto	
September 30	"Paint the Town Red"	Doja Cat	"Paint the Town Red"	Doja Cat	
October 7	"Paint the Town Red"	Doja Cat	"Paint the Town Red"	Doja Cat	
October 14	"3D"	Jung Kook featuring Jack Harlow	"3D"	Jung Kook featuring Jack Harlow	
October 21	"IDGAF"	Drake featuring Yeat	"You & Me"	Jennie	
October 28	"Monaco"	Bad Bunny	"Monaco"	Bad Bunny	
November 4	"Cruel Summer"	Taylor Swift	"Si No Estás"	Íñigo Quintero	
November 11	"Is It Over Now?"	Taylor Swift	"Si No Estás"	Íñigo Quintero	
November 18	"Standing Next to You"	Jung Kook	"Standing Next to You"	Jung Kook	
November 25	"Greedy"	Tate McRae	"Standing Next to You"	Jung Kook	
December 2	"Greedy"	Tate McRae	"Greedy"	Tate McRae	
December 9	"All I Want for Christmas Is You"	Mariah Carey	"All I Want for Christmas Is You"	Mariah Carey	
December 16	"All I Want for Christmas Is You"	Mariah Carey	"All I Want for Christmas Is You"	Mariah Carey	
December 23	"All I Want for Christmas Is You"	Mariah Carey	"All I Want for Christmas Is You"	Mariah Carey	
December 30	"All I Want for Christmas Is You"	Mariah Carey	"All I Want for Christmas Is You"	Mariah Carey	

== Number-one artists ==
List of number-one artists by total weeks at number one on Global 200
Position	Artist	Weeks at No. 1
1	Miley Cyrus	13
2	Jung Kook	9
3	Latto	7
4	Eslabon Armado	6
4	Peso Pluma	6
5	Mariah Carey	5
6	Doja Cat	4
6	Bad Bunny	4
7	SZA	2
7	Grupo Frontera	2
7	Olivia Rodrigo	2
7	Taylor Swift	2
7	Tate McRae	2
7	Mariah Carey	2
8	Karol G	1
8	Shakira	1
8	BTS	1
8	Jack Harlow	1
8	Drake	1
8	Yeat	1

List of number-one artists by total weeks at number one on Global Excl. US
Position	Artist	Weeks at No. 1
1	Miley Cyrus	13
2	Jung Kook	12
3	Latto	9
4	Mariah Carey	5
5	Bad Bunny	4
6	Grupo Frontera	3
6	Yoasobi	3
7	Rema	2
7	Selena Gomez	2
7	Fifty Fifty	2
7	Doja Cat	2
7	Íñigo Quintero	2
8	Karol G	1
8	Shakira	1
8	Bizarrap	1
8	Peso Pluma	1
8	BTS	1
8	Olivia Rodrigo	1
8	Myke Towers	1
8	Jack Harlow	1
8	Jennie	1
8	Tate McRae	1

== See also ==
- 2023 in music
- List of Billboard 200 number-one albums of 2023
- List of Billboard Hot 100 number ones of 2023
