= List of Billboard number-one R&B/hip-hop albums of 2023 =

This page lists the albums that reached number-one on the overall Top R&B/Hip-Hop Albums chart, the R&B Albums chart, and the Rap Albums chart in 2023. The R&B Albums and Rap Albums charts partly serve as respective distillations for R&B and rap-specific titles of the overall R&B/Hip-Hop Albums chart.

== List of number ones ==
Key
†	Indicates best-performing album of 2023 (Note: Although Her Loss by Drake and 21 Savage was the best performing rap album in 2023, its reign at number one on Rap Albums occurred in late 2022.)

Issue date	R&B/Hip-Hop Albums	Artist(s)	R&B Albums	Artist(s)	Rap Albums	Artist(s)	Refs.
January 7	SOS †	SZA	SOS †	SZA	Heroes & Villains	Metro Boomin	
January 14	SOS †	SZA	SOS †	SZA	Heroes & Villains	Metro Boomin	
January 21	SOS †	SZA	SOS †	SZA	Heroes & Villains	Metro Boomin	
January 28	SOS †	SZA	SOS †	SZA	Heroes & Villains	Metro Boomin	
February 4	SOS †	SZA	SOS †	SZA	Mansion Musik	Trippie Redd	
February 11	SOS †	SZA	SOS †	SZA	Heroes & Villains	Metro Boomin	
February 18	SOS †	SZA	SOS †	SZA	Heroes & Villains	Metro Boomin	
February 25	SOS †	SZA	SOS †	SZA	Heroes & Villains	Metro Boomin	
March 4	SOS †	SZA	SOS †	SZA	Heroes & Villains	Metro Boomin	
March 11	SOS †	SZA	SOS †	SZA	Afterlyfe	Yeat	
March 18	SOS †	SZA	SOS †	SZA	Heroes & Villains	Metro Boomin	
March 25	SOS †	SZA	SOS †	SZA	Heroes & Villains	Metro Boomin	
April 1	SOS †	SZA	SOS †	SZA	Heroes & Villains	Metro Boomin	
April 8	SOS †	SZA	SOS †	SZA	Heroes & Villains	Metro Boomin	
April 15	Call Me If You Get Lost	Tyler, the Creator	SOS †	SZA	Call Me If You Get Lost	Tyler, the Creator	
April 22	Hope	NF	SOS †	SZA	Hope	NF	
April 29	SOS †	SZA	SOS †	SZA	Heroes & Villains	Metro Boomin	
May 6	Don't Try This at Home	YoungBoy Never Broke Again	SOS †	SZA	Don't Try This at Home	YoungBoy Never Broke Again	
May 13	SOS †	SZA	SOS †	SZA	Jackman	Jack Harlow	
May 20	SOS †	SZA	SOS †	SZA	Heroes & Villains	Metro Boomin	
May 27	Richest Opp	YoungBoy Never Broke Again	SOS †	SZA	Richest Opp	YoungBoy Never Broke Again	
June 3	SOS †	SZA	SOS †	SZA	Heroes & Villains	Metro Boomin	
June 10	Almost Healed	Lil Durk	SOS †	SZA	Almost Healed	Lil Durk	
June 17	Almost Healed	Lil Durk	SOS †	SZA	Almost Healed	Lil Durk	
June 24	Spider-Man: Across the Spider-Verse	Metro Boomin	SOS †	SZA	Spider-Man: Across the Spider-Verse	Metro Boomin	
July 1	A Gift & a Curse	Gunna	SOS †	SZA	A Gift & a Curse	Gunna	
July 8	Business is Business	Young Thug	SOS †	SZA	Business is Business	Young Thug	
July 15	Pink Tape	Lil Uzi Vert	SOS †	SZA	Pink Tape	Lil Uzi Vert	
July 22	Pink Tape	Lil Uzi Vert	SOS †	SZA	Pink Tape	Lil Uzi Vert	
July 29	SOS †	SZA	SOS †	SZA	Pink Tape	Lil Uzi Vert	
August 5	SOS †	SZA	SOS †	SZA	A Gift & a Curse	Gunna	
August 12	Utopia	Travis Scott	SOS †	SZA	Utopia	Travis Scott	
August 19	Utopia	Travis Scott	SOS †	SZA	Utopia	Travis Scott	
August 26	Utopia	Travis Scott	SOS †	SZA	Utopia	Travis Scott	
September 2	Utopia	Travis Scott	SOS †	SZA	Utopia	Travis Scott	
September 9	Utopia	Travis Scott	SOS †	SZA	Utopia	Travis Scott	
September 16	Utopia	Travis Scott	SOS †	SZA	Utopia	Travis Scott	
September 23	Utopia	Travis Scott	SOS †	SZA	Utopia	Travis Scott	
September 30	Nostalgia	Rod Wave	SOS †	SZA	Nostalgia	Rod Wave	
October 7	Nostalgia	Rod Wave	SOS †	SZA	Nostalgia	Rod Wave	
October 14	Nostalgia	Rod Wave	SOS †	SZA	Nostalgia	Rod Wave	
October 21	For All the Dogs	Drake	SOS †	SZA	For All the Dogs	Drake	
October 28	For All the Dogs	Drake	SOS †	SZA	For All the Dogs	Drake	
November 4	For All the Dogs	Drake	SOS †	SZA	For All the Dogs	Drake	
November 11	For All the Dogs	Drake	SOS †	SZA	For All the Dogs	Drake	
November 18	For All the Dogs	Drake	SOS †	SZA	For All the Dogs	Drake	
November 25	For All the Dogs	Drake	11:11	Chris Brown	For All the Dogs	Drake	
December 2	For All the Dogs	Drake	SOS †	SZA	For All the Dogs	Drake	
December 9	For All the Dogs	Drake	SOS †	SZA	For All the Dogs	Drake	
December 16	For All the Dogs	Drake	SOS †	SZA	For All the Dogs	Drake	
December 23	Pink Friday 2	Nicki Minaj	SOS †	SZA	Pink Friday 2	Nicki Minaj	
December 30	Pink Friday 2	Nicki Minaj	The Christmas Song	Nat King Cole	Pink Friday 2	Nicki Minaj	

== See also ==
- 2023 in American music
- 2023 in hip hop music
- List of Billboard 200 number-one albums of 2023
- List of number-one R&B/hip-hop songs of 2023 (U.S.)
