= Anti-Hero (song) =

2022 single by Taylor Swift

Single by Taylor Swift

from the album Midnights
- Released: October 21, 2022
- Studio: Electric Lady (New York City); Rough Customer (Brooklyn); Sound House (Lakeland, Florida)
- Genre: Pop rock; synth-pop; electro; electropop
- Length: 3:20
- Label: Republic
- Songwriters: Taylor Swift; Jack Antonoff
- Producers: Taylor Swift; Jack Antonoff

Taylor Swift singles chronology
"The Joker and the Queen" (2022)	"Anti-Hero" (2022)	"Snow on the Beach" (2022)

Music video
- "Anti-Hero" on YouTube

"Anti-Hero" is a song by the American singer-songwriter Taylor Swift and the lead single from her tenth studio album, Midnights (2022). It was released on October 21, 2022, through Republic Records. Swift wrote and produced the song with Jack Antonoff. A pop rock, synth-pop, electro, and electropop track, "Anti-Hero" features a 1980s-inspired drum loop generated with a LinnDrum and retro synthesizers. Inspired by Swift's insecurities, the lyrics address self-loathing and the impact of fame on her wellbeing; the bridge depicts a nightmare in which her daughter-in-law murders her for the inheritance.

Music critics generally praised the production of "Anti-Hero" as catchy and featuring strong vocals. They deemed its lyricism candid and honest, showcasing Swift at her most self-critical. Many publications ranked the song among the best songs of 2022. "Anti-Hero" peaked atop the Billboard Global 200 and charted in the top 10 in many territories across the Americas, Europe, and Asia-Pacific. In the United States, it spent eight weeks atop the Billboard Hot 100 and made Swift the first artist to have a number-one single on the Radio Songs chart in the 2000s, 2010s, and 2020s decades. According to the International Federation of the Phonographic Industry, it was the ninth-most-streamed song of 2023.

Swift wrote and directed the music video for "Anti-Hero", which depicts her fears, insecurities, and eating disorder, using three different incarnations of her. The video reenacts the nightmare mentioned in the lyrics, starring Mike Birbiglia, John Early, and Mary Elizabeth Ellis as Swift's sons and daughter-in-law. "Anti-Hero" won a People's Choice Award, a Billboard Music Award, and two iHeartRadio Music Awards. At the 2023 MTV Video Music Awards, it won six awards including Video of the Year, making Swift the first artist to win the category two consecutive years. At the 2024 Grammy Awards, "Anti-Hero" was nominated for Record of the Year, Song of the Year, and Best Pop Solo Performance.

== Background and release ==
At the 2022 MTV Video Music Awards on August 28, 2022, Taylor Swift announced a new studio album, slated for release on October 21. After the show, Swift revealed the album title Midnights on her social media. Using the video-sharing platform TikTok, from September 21 to October 7, 2022, she released a 13-episode video series called Midnights Mayhem with Me, where she announced the title of each Midnights track in a randomized order per episode. In each episode, Swift rolled a lottery cage containing 13 ping pong balls numbered from 1 to 13, each representing a track of the album, and when a ball dropped out, she disclosed the title of the corresponding track through a telephone. In the sixth episode, released on October 3, 2022, Swift announced the title of the third track: "Anti-Hero".

"Anti-Hero" is the lead single from Midnights. On October 21, 2022, it was released for download onto Swift's website, exclusively to American customers, and to Italian radio by Universal Music Group. Republic Records released the song to the US hot adult contemporary radio on October 24, and contemporary hit radio on October 25. A duet remix featuring the band Bleachers was released for limited-time download onto Swift's website on November 7, and for general streaming and download the following day. The single was supported by remixes produced by the DJs Roosevelt, Kungs, Jayda G, and Illenium.

== Composition ==
"Anti-Hero"
A sample of the first chorus in "Anti-Hero", presenting the drum loop and synths

Swift wrote and produced "Anti-Hero" with Jack Antonoff. Speaking with Time, Antonoff said that he built upon "Out of the Woods", which he produced for 1989. For the synth sounds, he used an OB-8, which created a sound that he compared to "an old organ in a baseball stadium". He created the drum sounds by applying a tremolo onto a LinnDrum beat. The end product is a pop rock, synth-pop, electro, and electropop song. The song is written in the key of E major in common time with a tempo of 97 beats per minute. It is driven by a 1980s rock-influenced drum loop, coated in dense reverb. Critics described the synths as "simmering" and "buzzing".

"Anti-Hero" explores Swift's publicity, fame, and personal issues. It returns to the autobiographical songwriting that she deviated from on the 2020 albums Folklore and Evermore and contains cryptic allusions to her public and private lives that generated diverse interpretations. In a self-recorded video posted onto Instagram, Swift said that the track was influenced by how her life became "unmanageably sized", which made her "struggle with the idea of not feeling like a person". She described the song as a "guided tour" through the things that contributed to her self-loathing. The track starts with Swift examining her flaws: "I have this thing where I get older but just never wiser", which Carl Wilson from Slate described as a reflection on her early fame.

In the first verse ("When my depression works the graveyard shift/ All the people I've ghosted stand there in the room"), she looks back on her difficult past. According to The Washington Post's Emily Yahr, these lines allude to Swift's past celebrity controversies, including the events in 2016 that made Swift think her career was over. The second verse discusses how her fame hinders her from having real, meaningful connections: "Sometimes I feel like everyone is a sexy baby/ And I'm the monster on the hill;" there were varied opinions about whether these lines conjectured an insult, a confession, or an exaggerated self-image, and some internet audiences said they potentially referred to the sitcom series 30 Rock. Lindsay Zoladz of The New York Times opined that the "sexy baby" lyric demonstrated the fetishization of female youth in the music industry. Swift makes fun of her public display of charitable acts with the lines, "Did you hear my covert narcissism/ I disguise as altruism/ Like some kind of congressman?"

In the chorus, Swift identifies herself as the source of her problems: "It's me, hi/ I'm the problem, it's me/ At teatime, everybody agrees/ I'll stare directly at the sun but never in the mirror/ It must be exhausting, always rooting for the anti-hero;" some critics said that these lines constituted the song's hook. American Songwriter's Jacob Uitti commented that these lyrics reflected the song's central theme: taking responsibility, or a lack thereof. Uitti added that these lyrics cautioned the listeners to not look to pop stars like Swift as "saviors". In the bridge, Swift describes a nightmare in which her daughter-in-law murders her to inherit her fortune, and she goes to hell for not being as earnest as she appeared.

Some critics commented that the production complemented the lyrics. According to The New Yorker's Lauren Michele Jackson, the verses are "bisected": the lyrics are sung "aloft and lilting on one phrase and near monotonic the next". Jackson said that this delivery made it seem as if Swift backed up each confessional lyric with a rebuttal afterwards. As the song ends, Swift repeats the chorus multiple times as the instrumental halts. Variety's Chris Willman described her vocals in the last choruses as "out of breath", and The Ringer's Rob Harvilla characterized them as "flustered, stammering". Jackson wrote that she sounded "weary" and, after she "[hisses]" the line "everybody agrees", "the song snaps back into place, its pep suddenly restored".

== Critical reception ==
"Anti-Hero" received widespread critical acclaim. Some picked it as a highlight on Midnights and lauded it as a great lead single for its lyricism, including Harvilla, Exclaim!'s Megan LaPierre, Rolling Stone's Brittany Spanos, and The Independent's Helen Brown. Olivia Horn of Pitchfork described the single as an amalgamation of Swift's past albums, including "the lacquered synth-pop of 1989, the neurotic image analysis of Reputation, the dense lyricism of Folklore and Evermore". Horn added that the lyrics were full of surprising twists that deserved attention, and Rob Sheffield said the song was "like Season Two of 'The Man' full of killer lines".

The production also received positive comments; Lindsay Zoladz of The New York Times called it "infectious", and Willman said that the track had an "earworm hook" and praised Swift's delivery of the final refrains as confident and a display of a "master of tragicomic dramaturgy". The Guardian critic Alexis Petridis stated "Anti-Hero" offers "a litany of small-hours self-loathing", but sensed "an appealing confidence" in Swift's approach—that she "no longer feels she has to compete on the same terms as her peers." Billboard journalist Jason Lipshutz ranked it as the best song on Midnights. He commended its "wondrously scathing self-examination", "sardonic masterstrokes", and Antonoff's "sleek, shiny" production.

The Observer critic Kitty Empire picked "Anti-Hero" as one of the most "fascinating" tracks of the album, because of its "darkest self-flagellation". Carl Wilson of Slate highlighted the lyrics, praising "the image of a touring superstar as an unrelatable monster" and Evermore-inspired "vignette" in the bridge about her future children. Wilson also admired Swift's "expanded" vocal tones, such as a "fantasy-European elevation reminiscent of Kate Bush" and "a very Yankee drawl". Calling "Anti-Hero" the "musical and emotional heart" of Midnights, Rick Quinn of PopMatters praised its "infectious" beat, "earworm" rhythm, Swift's enunciation, and Antonoff's production. He interpreted the "monster on a hill" lyric as Swift's "impossibility of blending in as one of America's biggest cultural figures." John Murphy of MusicOMH regarded "Anti-Hero" as "a Taylor Swift classic in the making", naming it one of the best songs she has ever written. DIY said "Anti-Hero" is arguably Swift's best lead-single. GQ named "Anti-Hero" one of the best songs of 2022. In a less enthusiastic review, Mark Richardson of The Wall Street Journal said the music was "overstuffed" and the lyrics were "awkwardly overwritten".

Critics' rankings of "Anti-Hero"
Publication	List	Rank	Ref.
BBC	25 Best Songs of 2022	4	
Billboard	The 100 Best Songs of 2022	5	
Billboard	The 500 Best Pop Songs of All Time	364	
DIY	DIY's Tracks of 2022	5	
Entertainment Weekly	The 10 Best Songs of 2022	7	
Los Angeles Times	The 100 Best Songs of 2022	9	
NPR	The 100 Best Songs of 2022	33	
The New York Times	Lindsay Zoladz's Best Songs of 2022	5	
NME	The 50 Best Songs of 2022	17	
Paste	The 50 Best Songs of 2022	14	
Pitchfork	The 100 Best Songs of 2022	44	
Slant Magazine	The 50 Best Songs of 2022	2	
The Sydney Morning Herald	The 23 Best Songs of 2022	5	
Time Out	The 22 Best Songs of 2022	15	
USA Today	The 10 Best Songs of 2022	2	

== Commercial performance ==
Upon the release of Midnights, "Anti-Hero" earned over 17.4 million plays in its first 24 hours on Spotify globally, becoming the biggest opening day for a song in the platform's history. The single debuted atop the Billboard Global 200 and Global Excl. US charts, marking Swift's second number-one song on both the charts since their inception in 2020.

In the United States, "Anti-Hero" debuted atop the Billboard Hot 100 as Swift's ninth number-one song in the country, with 59.7 million streams, 13,500 digital downloads sold, and an airplay audience of 32 million. Swift became the first artist to simultaneously occupy the top 10 spots of the Billboard Hot 100 chart; the first artist to debut atop the Hot 100 with solo songs five times; (Note: After "Shake It Off" (2014), "Cardigan" (2020), "Willow" (2020), and "All Too Well (Taylor's Version)" (2021). Ariana Grande has debuted five songs atop the chart, but two of them—"Stuck with U" and "Rain on Me"—are collaborations.) the female artist with the most top-10 entries (40), surpassing Madonna (38); the first artist to debut atop both the Billboard 200 and Hot 100 simultaneously as many as four times; (Note: Following Folklore and "Cardigan", Evermore and "Willow", and Red (Taylor's Version) and "All Too Well (Taylor's Version)".) and the first artist to occupy the entire top-ten of the Hot 100, Streaming Songs, and Digital Songs charts simultaneously. The single spent a total of eight weeks at the top spot of the Hot 100, surpassing "Blank Space" (2014) as Swift's longest-running number-one song. It remained atop the Hot 100 for six consecutive weeks, paving way for Mariah Carey's "All I Want for Christmas Is You" (1994) to top the chart for the next four weeks during the holiday season, and returned to the top spot for two additional weeks in January 2023. "Anti-Hero" is the 10th song in Hot 100 history to spend its first six weeks at number one, and sold 327,000 digital downloads in its third week in the US, achieving the biggest digital downloads week for any song since her own "Look What You Made Me Do" (2017) sold 353,000 in its first week. The song finished 2022 as the best-selling song of the year, with a total 436,000 digital downloads sold. "Anti-Hero" spent 28 weeks in the Hot 100 top ten, surpassing "Shake It Off" as Swift's longest-running top-ten single.

The single was also Swift's first wide success on US radio formats since "Delicate" (2018), topping several airplay charts. "Anti-Hero" debuted at number 13 on the Radio Songs chart, a personal best for Swift, and eventually became her seventh number-one on the chart, making Swift the first artist to score a chart-topper in the 2000s, 2010s and 2020s decades separately. It peaked atop the Pop Airplay chart for three non-consecutive weeks and became her 10th number one on the chart and her first since "Delicate"; marked her ninth number-one on the Adult Top 40 chart, which it ruled for nine consecutive weeks to surpass "Shake It Off" as Swift's longest-running number-one single; and topped the Adult Contemporary chart dated March 25, 2023, to mark Swift's eighth number-one on the chart—the most for any artist in the 21st-century.

In Australia, "Anti-Hero" charted at number one on both the ARIA Singles and Airplay charts. It marked Swift's ninth number-one song in Australia, and became the first song ever to debut atop the airplay chart. It has spent six consecutive weeks atop the singles chart, with its first five weeks alongside Midnights' number-one run atop the albums chart—a record "Chart Double" streak. "Anti-Hero" debuted atop New Zealand's singles chart as well, and spent nine consecutive weeks atop the Billboard Philippines Songs chart, the longest for an international artist.

In the United Kingdom, "Anti-Hero" marked Swift's second number-one single in the UK after "Look What You Made Me Do"; both debuted atop the UK Singles Chart. Swift became the first woman since Miley Cyrus in 2013 (Bangerz and "Wrecking Ball") to simultaneously debut atop the albums and singles chart, following the number-one debut of Midnights as well. "Anti-Hero" spent six consecutive weeks atop the chart, surpassing "Look What You Made Me Do" to become her longest-running number one on the chart, and spent 15 non-consecutive weeks in the top ten, surpassing "Shake It Off" to become her longest-running top-ten hit, later surpassed by "Cruel Summer". It debuted atop the Irish Singles Chart, marking her third chart-topper in Ireland, and formed a Chart Double with Midnights' debut atop the Irish Albums Chart. The song was number-one in Ireland for six consecutive weeks.

Elsewhere, "Anti-Hero" scored Swift her first top-ten song on Germany's Top 100 Songs chart since "Look What You Made Me Do", debuting at number eight and later peaking at number seven whilst charting for 70 weeks, becoming Swift's longest-running single on the chart. "Anti-Hero" charted at number one in Belgium and Latvia, for six and three non-consecutive weeks, respectively. It broke the all-time records for the most streams for a song by an international artist in a week and day on Spotify Brazil and Canada. It received a gold certification from Music Canada within its first five days. "Anti-Hero" also topped the Canadian Hot 100 for five weeks, and marked her ninth number-one song in Canada. "Anti-Hero" was the ninth-most-streamed song of 2023 according to the International Federation of the Phonographic Industry (IFPI), with an equivalent of 1.31 billion global subscription streams.

== Music video ==
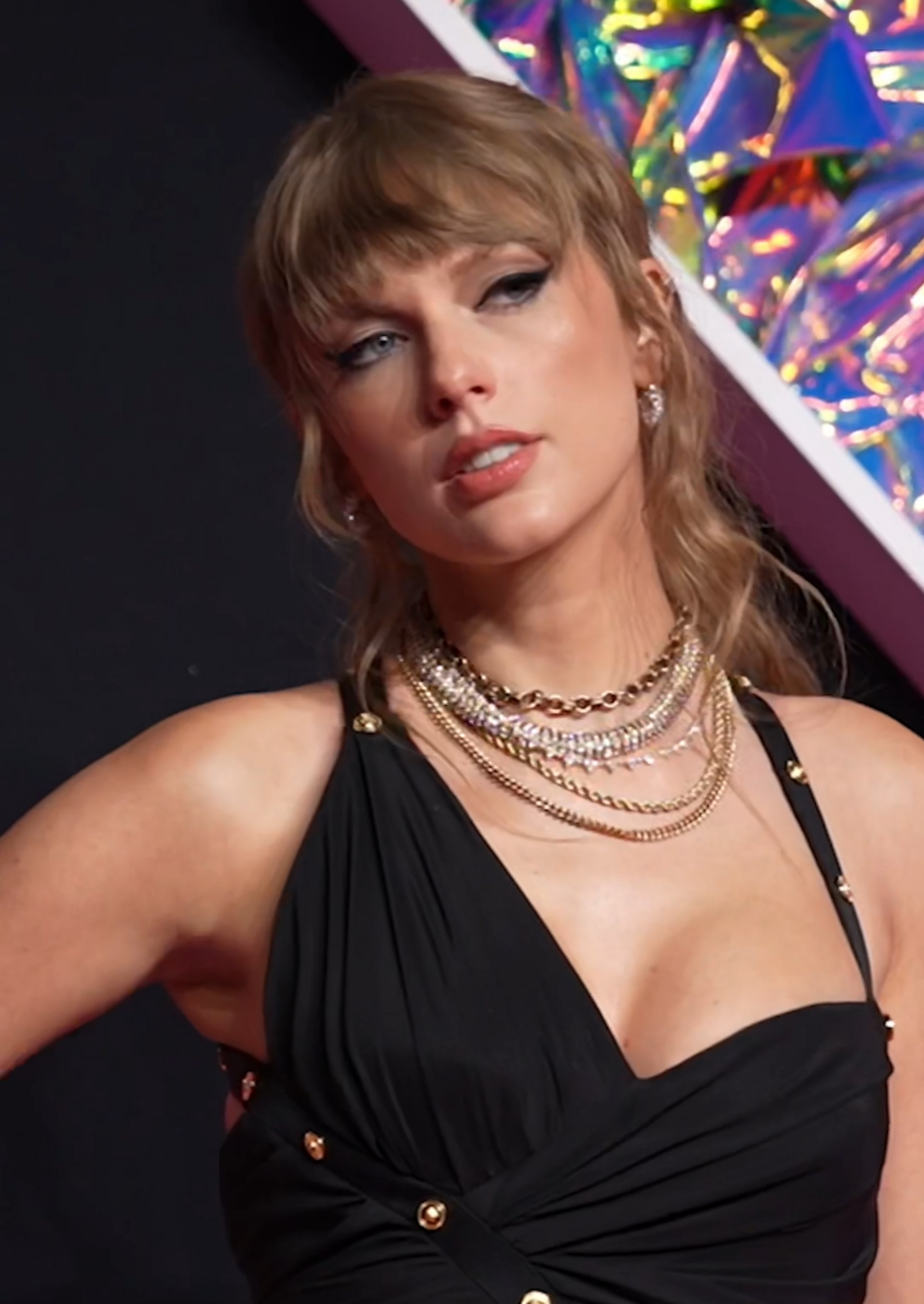
Swift at the 2023 MTV Video Music Awards, where "Anti-Hero" won six awards, including Video of the Year and Best Direction

On October 16, Swift posted a short video on her social media accounts that depicted an itinerary of the events scheduled for the album launch, entitled Midnights Mayhem. It specified a music video release for "Anti-Hero" the same day as the album. Excerpts from the video were shown in a teaser trailer for the album's visuals during Amazon Prime Video's broadcast of Thursday Night Football on October 20. Besides Swift, the names of the cast of the song's music video—Mike Birbiglia, John Early, and Mary Elizabeth Ellis—also appeared in the trailer. The music video for "Anti-Hero", written and directed by Swift, premiered via her Vevo channel on YouTube at 08:00 Eastern Daylight Time (EDT) on October 21, eight hours after the song's and album's release.

=== Synopsis ===
The video opens with Swift singing the first verse in a 1970s-style suburban home kitchen at night, briefly surrounded by ghosts in tablecloths. She opens the front door, revealing a second version of herself with her early-2010s appearance and a tour dance outfit, and they drink shots and sing the chorus together. The "current" version plays the koi fish acoustic guitar that she used on the Speak Now World Tour, while the "younger" version smashes a copy of it on the floor and criticizes the weight of the current version. A photograph of Swift's grandmother, Marjorie Finlay, is seen in the background during the bathroom scene. A third, giant version of Swift crawls into a neighbor's dinner party during the second verse, whereupon a guest unsuccessfully tries to subdue her by shooting her in the shoulder with a bow and arrow. The giant version of Swift gives a shocked and disbelieving look in response and glumly eats the guests' food alone.

The dialogue portion of the video plays during the bridge, which describes Swift's dream of her own funeral, attended by her fictional sons Preston and Chad (Birbiglia and Early) and daughter-in-law Kimber (Ellis), the latter of whom Chad, who arrived from Ibiza, implicates in the apparent murder of Swift. The narrator Swift, who is invisible, peeks from inside her elder self's coffin before getting out. The three attendees learn that Swift's last will and testament leaves them each with 13 cents and bequeaths her assets, including a beach house, to her cats Benjamin, Meredith and Olivia. Believing their mother left a secret encoded message, because "that's what mom would always do", a reference to Swift's "Easter eggs", her children keep reading but find out their inheritance is exactly as stated. This leads to bickering over who capitalized on Swift's name the most, in ways such as Chad recording the funeral for his podcast or Kimber wearing Swift's dress from the Fearless Tour. The ceremony ends in a brawl after Chad accuses Kimber of killing Swift by pushing her off a balcony. The final scene of the video shows the first two versions of Swift sitting on the rooftop and offering a bottle of wine to the giant version, who happily accepts.

=== Reception ===
A scene in the "Anti-Hero" music video depicting Swift's body dysmorphia. It features two versions of Swift, one stepping on a scale while the other shakes her head in disapproval of her weight.

The music video received generally positive reviews from critics. However, a brief scene in the video alluding to Swift's struggles with eating disorder received mixed reactions from some social media users, who accused Swift of fatphobia. The scene depicts a depressed Swift stepping on a bathroom scale, which reads "fat", making the other, happier Swift shake her head in disapproval. An op-ed from The Cut said the scene "reinforces the idea of being 'fat' as bad". Several other social media users defended Swift. Op-eds from publications such as The Guardian, The Independent and The Daily Telegraph, and television shows like The View also sided with Swift, arguing that context is important, and given her history with an eating disorder, she should not have to "sanitize" her psychological trauma to make her art "digestible" for audiences. They highlighted that the point of "Anti-Hero" and its video is to illustrate "the warped workings of her brain back when she was in the throes of an eating disorder".

Nevertheless, the video was later edited to remove the specific shot of the scale. The removal of the scene also sparked criticism. Maya Georgi of NBC News questioned why Swift has "once again, let criticism control her actions" and why "did she not stand by the critique she was making with this scene". Georgi also said that Swift was "boldly" demonstrating "the damage the rhetoric of valuing thinness and demonizing larger bodies has done to her", and that "it's not an easy thing to unlearn. I am still unlearning it. Thousands of people across the gender spectrum are still unlearning it." Tomás Mier of Rolling Stone wrote Swift "had to water down her artistic expression and how she chose to portray her lived experience" and concluded, "Simply put: It's not that [Swift] thinks being fat is a bad thing, but that she was made to believe that it was."

The casket in the funeral scene from the music video is a direct-to-consumer model purchased from a company called Titan Casket, based in Bellevue, Washington, and Andover, Massachusetts. It received online attention and experienced a "huge spike in sales", according to the company.

== Performances and usage ==
- Swift publicly performed "Anti-Hero" for the first time on January 12, 2023, as a surprise guest at the London show of the English band the 1975's 2023 concert tour, At Their Very Best.
- A large portion of the song was used in the final episode of the fourth season of You, an American psychological thriller series on Netflix.
- The song is on the set list of Swift's sixth headlining concert tour, the Eras Tour (2023–2024).
- The hook "It's me, Hi, I'm the problem, it's me" turned into a meme.

== Cover versions ==
- The song was covered by the English singer-songwriter Mimi Webb and the Irish singer-songwriter Dermot Kennedy on BBC One's Live Lounge.
- The song was covered by the Australian drum and bass band Pendulum on the Australian radio station Triple J as part of Like a Version.
- The actor and musician Jack Black sang "Anti-Hero" while performing a striptease during the Give Back-ular Spectacular! Show at Los Angeles' Orpheum Theatre as part of a fundraising event for TV and film crews affected by the SAG-AFTRA strike.
- The Australian rock musician Paul Kelly covered the song for the radio station Triple M.
- The Norwegian musician Sondre Lerche released a version of "Anti-Hero" as part of an annual holiday tradition of covering a pop song from the past year. This cover was also included on the 2023 compilation album Understudy.

== Accolades ==
The single won and was nominated for various accolades. At the 2023 MTV Video Music Awards, Swift received 11 nominations, becoming the most nominated artist of the evening. "Anti-Hero" won six of the seven categories it was nominated in.

Awards and nominations
Organization	Year	Category	Result	Ref.
People's Choice Awards	2022	The Music Video of 2022	Won	
Capricho Awards	2022	International Hit of the Year	Won	
Hit FM Music Awards	2023	Top 10 Single	Won	
ADG Excellence in Production Design Awards	2023	Short Format: Music Video or Web Series	Nominated	
iHeartRadio Music Awards	2023	Song of the Year	Won	
iHeartRadio Music Awards	2023	Best Lyrics	Won	
iHeartRadio Music Awards	2023	Best Music Video	Nominated	
Brit Awards	2023	International Song of the Year	Nominated	
Gaffa Awards	2023	International Hit of the Year	Nominated	
Global Awards	2023	Best Song	Nominated	
Nickelodeon Kids' Choice Awards	2023	Favorite Song	Nominated	
MTV MIAW Awards	2023	Global Hit of the Year	Nominated	
MTV Millennial Awards	2023	Global Hit of the Year	Nominated	
MTV Video Music Awards	2023	Video of the Year	Won	
MTV Video Music Awards	2023	Song of the Year	Won	
MTV Video Music Awards	2023	Best Direction	Won	
MTV Video Music Awards	2023	Best Pop	Won	
MTV Video Music Awards	2023	Best Visual Effects	Won	
MTV Video Music Awards	2023	Best Cinematography	Won	
MTV Video Music Awards	2023	Best Editing	Nominated	
MTV Europe Music Awards	2023	Best Video	Won	
MTV Europe Music Awards	2023	Best Song	Nominated	
NRJ Music Awards	2023	International Video of the Year	Nominated	
Billboard Music Awards	2023	Top Hot 100 Song	Nominated	
Billboard Music Awards	2023	Top Radio Song	Nominated	
Billboard Music Awards	2023	Top Streaming Song	Nominated	
Billboard Music Awards	2023	Top Selling Song	Won	
Billboard Music Awards	2023	Top Billboard Global 200 Song	Nominated	
Musa Awards	2023	International Anglo Song of the Year	Nominated	
RTHK International Pop Poll Awards	2023	Top Ten International Gold Songs	Won	
RTHK International Pop Poll Awards	2023	Super Gold Song	Won	
IFPI Awards	2023	IFPI Top 10 Global Singles Award of 2023	Won	
Grammy Awards	2024	Record of the Year	Nominated	
Grammy Awards	2024	Song of the Year	Nominated	
Grammy Awards	2024	Best Pop Solo Performance	Nominated	
APRA Awards	2024	Most Performed International Work	Won	
BMI Awards	2024	Most Performed Song of the Year	Won	

== Track listing ==
Digital download and streaming

- "Anti-Hero" – 3:21
- "Anti-Hero" (Illenium remix) – 4:27
- "Anti-Hero" (acoustic version) – 3:16

Digital download

- "Anti-Hero" (instrumental) – 3:21
- "Anti-Hero" (Kungs remix extended version) – 3:55

Digital download and streaming – Single

1. "Anti-Hero" (featuring Bleachers) – 3:48
2. "Anti-Hero" – 3:21

Digital download and streaming – Remixes

1. "Anti-Hero" (featuring Bleachers) – 3:48
2. "Anti-Hero" (Roosevelt remix) – 4:59
3. "Anti-Hero" (Kungs remix) – 3:14
4. "Anti-Hero" (Jayda G remix) – 3:35
5. "Anti-Hero" – 3:21

== Credits and personnel ==
Credits are adapted from the liner notes of Midnights.

Recording

- Recorded at Rough Customer Studio (Brooklyn) and Electric Lady Studios (New York City)
- Mixed at MixStar Studios (Virginia Beach)
- Mastered at Sterling Sound (Edgewater, New Jersey)
- Bobby Hawk's performance was recorded by Jon Gautier at Sound House Studios (Lakeland, Florida)

Personnel

- Taylor Swift – vocals, songwriter, producer
- Jack Antonoff – songwriter, producer, Linndrum programming, percussion, modular synths, Prophet-5, bass, acoustic guitars, Juno 6, Mellotron, Wurlitzer, background vocals, recording
- Bobby Hawk – violin
- Megan Searl – assistant engineer
- Jon Sher – assistant engineer
- John Rooney – assistant engineer
- Serban Ghenea – mixing
- Bryce Bordone – assistant mix engineer
- Randy Merrill – mastering
- Jon Gautier – recording
- Laura Sisk – recording

== Charts ==
=== Weekly charts ===
Weekly chart performance for "Anti-Hero"
Chart (2022–2023)	Peak position
Argentina Hot 100 (Billboard)	40
Australia (ARIA)	1
Austria (Ö3 Austria Top 40)	6
Belgium (Ultratop 50 Flanders)	1
Belgium (Ultratop 50 Wallonia)	13
Brazil (Billboard)	8
Bulgaria (PROPHON)	6
Canada Hot 100 (Billboard)	1
Canada AC (Billboard)	1
Canada CHR/Top 40 (Billboard)	2
Canada Hot AC (Billboard)	1
CIS Airplay (TopHit)	56
Croatia (HRT)	1
Czech Republic Airplay (ČNS IFPI)	2
Czech Republic Singles Digital (ČNS IFPI)	8
Denmark (Tracklisten)	7
Denmark Airplay (Tracklisten)	1
El Salvador (Monitor Latino)	14
Finland (Suomen virallinen lista)	10
France (SNEP)	32
Germany (GfK)	7
German Airplay (Official German Charts)	1
Global 200 (Billboard)	1
Greece International (IFPI)	2
Hong Kong (Billboard)	6
Hungary (Rádiós Top 40)	26
Hungary (Single Top 40)	31
Hungary (Stream Top 40)	8
Iceland (Tónlistinn)	4
India International Singles (IMI)	4
Indonesia (Billboard)	1
Ireland (IRMA)	1
Israel (Media Forest)	6
Italy (FIMI)	26
Japan Hot 100 (Billboard)	34
Latvia (LAIPA)	17
Lebanon (Lebanese Top 20)	3
Lithuania (AGATA)	5
Luxembourg (Billboard)	6
Malaysia (Billboard)	1
MENA (IFPI)	20
Mexico Airplay (Monitor Latino)	8
Netherlands (Dutch Top 40)	5
Netherlands (Single Top 100)	9
New Zealand (Recorded Music NZ)	1
Nigeria (TurnTable Top 100)	32
Norway (VG-lista)	3
Panama (Monitor Latino)	10
Paraguay (Monitor Latino)	9
Philippines (Billboard)	1
Portugal (AFP)	2
Puerto Rico (Monitor Latino)	17
Romania (Billboard)	17
San Marino (SMRRTV Top 50)	29
Singapore (RIAS)	1
Slovakia Airplay (ČNS IFPI)	11
Slovakia Singles Digital (ČNS IFPI)	6
South Africa (RISA)	3
South Korea (Circle)	174
Spain (Promusicae)	14
Spain Airplay (Promusicae)	15
Sweden (Sverigetopplistan)	5
Switzerland (Schweizer Hitparade)	6
Switzerland Airplay (Schweizer Hitparade)	3
Taiwan (Billboard)	5
Turkey (Radiomonitor Türkiye)	6
UK Singles (Official Charts)	1
Ukraine Airplay (TopHit)	21
Uruguay (Monitor Latino)	15
US Billboard Hot 100	1
US Adult Contemporary (Billboard)	1
US Adult Pop Airplay (Billboard)	1
US Dance Airplay (Billboard)	3
US Pop Airplay (Billboard)	1
Vietnam Hot 100 (Billboard)	2

=== Monthly charts ===
Monthly chart performance for "Anti-Hero"
Chart (2023)	Peak position
Brazil Streaming (Pro-Música Brasil)	47
Ukraine Airplay (TopHit)	78

=== Year-end charts ===
2022 year-end chart performance for "Anti-Hero"
Chart (2022)	Position
Australia (ARIA)	43
Belgium (Ultratop 50 Flanders)	94
Germany (Official German Charts)	100
Netherlands (Dutch Top 40)	54
Switzerland (Schweizer Hitparade)	97
UK Singles (OCC)	59

2023 year-end chart performance for "Anti-Hero"
Chart (2023)	Position
Australia (ARIA)	4
Austria (Ö3 Austria Top 40)	16
Belgium (Ultratop 50 Flanders)	4
Belgium (Ultratop 50 Wallonia)	55
Canada (Canadian Hot 100)	5
Denmark (Tracklisten)	62
Germany (Official German Charts)	18
Global 200 (Billboard)	4
Iceland (Tónlistinn)	95
Netherlands (Dutch Top 40)	40
Netherlands (Single Top 100)	41
New Zealand (Recorded Music NZ)	17
Philippines (Billboard)	7
Sweden (Sverigetopplistan)	53
Switzerland (Schweizer Hitparade)	44
UK Singles (OCC)	4
US Billboard Hot 100	4
US Adult Contemporary (Billboard)	2
US Adult Pop Airplay (Billboard)	2
US Dance/Mix Show Airplay (Billboard)	4
US Pop Airplay (Billboard)	9

2024 year-end chart performance for "Anti-Hero"
Chart (2024)	Position
Australia (ARIA)	52
Global 200 (Billboard)	63
UK Singles (OCC)	56
US Adult Contemporary (Billboard)	6

Year-end chart performance
Chart (2025)	Position
Argentina Anglo Airplay (Monitor Latino)	96

== Certifications ==
Certifications for "Anti-Hero"
Region	Certification	Certified units/sales
Australia (ARIA)	8× Platinum	560,000^{‡}
Austria (IFPI Austria)	2× Platinum	60,000^{‡}
Belgium (BRMA)	Platinum	40,000^{‡}
Brazil (Pro-Música Brasil)	3× Diamond	480,000^{‡}
Canada (Music Canada)	2× Platinum	160,000^{‡}
Denmark (IFPI Danmark)	Platinum	90,000^{‡}
France (SNEP)	Platinum	200,000^{‡}
Germany (BVMI)	Platinum	600,000^{‡}
Italy (FIMI)	Platinum	100,000^{‡}
Mexico (AMPROFON)	2× Platinum+Gold	350,000^{‡}
New Zealand (RMNZ)	4× Platinum	120,000^{‡}
Norway (IFPI Norway)	Gold	30,000^{‡}
Poland (ZPAV)	Platinum	50,000^{‡}
Portugal (AFP)	2× Platinum	20,000^{‡}
Spain (Promusicae)	2× Platinum	120,000^{‡}
Switzerland (IFPI Switzerland)	Platinum	20,000^{‡}
United Kingdom (BPI)	4× Platinum	2,400,000^{‡}
Streaming
Greece (IFPI Greece)	Gold	1,000,000^{†}
Japan (RIAJ)	Gold	50,000,000^{†}
Sweden (GLF)	Platinum	12,000,000^{†}
Worldwide	—	1,310,000,000
^{‡} Sales+streaming figures based on certification alone.^{†} Streaming-only figures based on certification alone.

== Release history ==
Release dates and formats
Region	Date	Format	Version	Label(s)	Ref.
Italy	October 21, 2022	Radio airplay	Original	Universal	
United States	October 21, 2022	Digital download	Original	Republic	
United States	October 24, 2022	AC radio; hot AC radio; modern AC radio	Original	Republic	
United States	October 25, 2022	Contemporary hit radio	Original	Republic	
United States	November 3, 2022	Digital download	Instrumental	Republic	
United States	November 7, 2022	Digital download	Bleachers remix	Republic	
Various	November 8, 2022	Digital download; streaming	Bleachers remix	Republic	
United States	November 9, 2022	Digital download	Roosevelt remix	Republic	
United States	November 10, 2022	Digital download	Kungs remix	Republic	
United States	November 10, 2022	Digital download	Jayda G remix	Republic	
United States	November 11, 2022	Digital download	Acoustic	Republic	
United States	November 11, 2022	Digital download	Kungs remix extended	Republic	
Various	November 11, 2022	Digital download; streaming	Remixes	Republic	
United States	November 17, 2022	Digital download	Illenium remix	Republic	
Various	November 18, 2022	Digital download; streaming	Illenium remix	Republic	
Various	November 25, 2022	Digital download; streaming	Acoustic	Republic	

== See also ==
- List of Billboard Adult Contemporary number ones of 2023
- List of Billboard Digital Song Sales number ones of 2022
- List of Billboard Digital Song Sales number ones of 2023
- List of Billboard Global 200 number ones of 2022
- List of Billboard Hot 100 number ones of 2022
- List of Billboard Hot 100 number ones of 2023
- List of Billboard Hot 100 top-ten singles in 2022
- List of Billboard Streaming Songs number ones of 2022
- List of Canadian Hot 100 number-one singles of 2022
- List of number-one singles from the 2020s (New Zealand)
- List of number-one singles of 2022 (Australia)
- List of number-one singles of 2022 (Ireland)
- List of number-one songs of 2022 (Malaysia)
- List of number-one songs of 2022 (Singapore)
- List of Ultratop 50 number-one singles of 2022
- List of Ultratop 50 number-one singles of 2023
- List of UK top-ten singles in 2022
- List of UK Singles Chart number ones of 2022
