= List of Billboard Digital Song Sales number ones of 2022 =

2022 highest-selling digital singles in the United States

The Billboard Digital Song Sales chart is a chart that ranks the most downloaded songs in the United States. Its data is compiled by Nielsen SoundScan based on each song's weekly digital sales, which combines sales of different versions of a song by an act for a summarized figure.

== Chart history ==
Key
†	Indicates best-performing song of 2022

Issue date	Song	Artist(s)	Weekly sales	Ref(s)
January 1	"Broadway Girls"	Lil Durk featuring Morgan Wallen	21,000	
January 8	"Christmas Tree"	V	23,500	
January 15	"Cold Heart (Pnau remix)" †	Elton John and Dua Lipa	13,300	
January 22	"ABCDEFU"	Gayle	10,200	
January 29	"We Don't Talk About Bruno"	Carolina Gaitán, Mauro Castillo, Adassa, Rhenzy Feliz, Diane Guerrero, Stephanie Beatriz and the Encanto cast	9,400	
February 5	"We the People"	Kid Rock	21,100	
February 12	"We the People"	Kid Rock	14,600	
February 19	"Do We Have a Problem?"	Nicki Minaj and Lil Baby	48,000	
February 26	"The Next Episode"	Dr. Dre featuring Snoop Dogg		
March 5	"Cold Heart (Pnau remix)" †	Elton John and Dua Lipa		
March 12	"ABCDEFU"	Gayle	10,500	
March 19	"Handsomer"	Russ featuring Ktlyn		
March 26	"'Til You Can't"	Cody Johnson	8,400	
April 2	"Blick Blick"	Coi Leray and Nicki Minaj	8,000	
April 9	"We Go Up"	Nicki Minaj featuring Fivio Foreign		
April 16	"Big Energy"	Latto and Mariah Carey featuring DJ Khaled	12,600	
April 23	"First Class"	Jack Harlow	10,600	
April 30	"Don't Think Jesus"	Morgan Wallen	21,500	
May 7	"With You"	Jimin and Ha Sung-woon	9,800	
May 14	"As It Was"	Harry Styles	16,300	
May 21	"Thought You Should Know"	Morgan Wallen	18,700	
May 28	"You Proof"	Morgan Wallen	23,100	
June 4	"About Damn Time"	Lizzo	11,900	
June 11	"Running Up That Hill (A Deal With God)"	Kate Bush	18,300	
June 18	"Running Up That Hill (A Deal With God)"	Kate Bush	22,200	
June 25	"Yet to Come (The Most Beautiful Moment)"	BTS		
July 2	"Break My Soul"	Beyoncé	22,000	
July 9	"Left and Right"	Charlie Puth featuring Jung Kook		
July 16	"Running Up That Hill (A Deal With God)"	Kate Bush	17,000	
July 23	"Running Up That Hill (A Deal With God)"	Kate Bush	13,000	
July 30	"About Damn Time"	Lizzo	14,000	
August 6	"Progress"	John Rich	41,000	
August 13	"Victoria's Secret"	Jax	7,000	
August 20	"Bad Decisions"	Benny Blanco, BTS and Snoop Dogg	45,000	
August 27	"Super Freaky Girl"	Nicki Minaj	89,000	
September 3	"Super Freaky Girl"	Nicki Minaj	15,000	
September 10	"Hold Me Closer"	Elton John and Britney Spears	48,000	
September 17	"Hold Me Closer"	Elton John and Britney Spears		
September 24	"Thank God"	Kane Brown and Katelyn Brown	16,000	
October 1	"I'm Good (Blue)"	David Guetta and Bebe Rexha	9,000	
October 8	"Unholy"	Sam Smith and Kim Petras	12,000	
October 15	"Unholy"	Sam Smith and Kim Petras	11,000	
October 22	"Unholy"	Sam Smith and Kim Petras	12,000	
October 29	"Unholy"	Sam Smith and Kim Petras	19,000	
November 5	"Question...?"	Taylor Swift	21,400	
November 12	"The Astronaut"	Jin	44,000	
November 19	"Anti-Hero"	Taylor Swift	327,000	
November 26	"Anti-Hero"	Taylor Swift	29,000	
December 3	"Dreamers"	Jung Kook		
December 10	"Anti-Hero"	Taylor Swift	13,000	
December 17	"Wild Flower"	RM featuring Youjeen	29,000	
December 24	"All I Want for Christmas Is You"	Mariah Carey	11,000	
December 31	"All I Want for Christmas Is You"	Mariah Carey	11,000	
