= List of Billboard Streaming Songs number ones of 2022 =

This is a list of songs that reached number one on the Billboard magazine Streaming Songs chart in 2022.

== Chart history ==
Key
The best-performing single of 2022, "Heat Waves" by Glass Animals, never reached number one on the chart.

Issue date	Song	Artist(s)	Weekly streams
January 1	"All I Want for Christmas Is You"	Mariah Carey	47.5 million
January 8	"All I Want for Christmas Is You"	Mariah Carey	35.4 million
January 15	"We Don't Talk About Bruno"	Carolina Gaitán, Mauro Castillo, Adassa, Rhenzy Feliz, Diane Guerrero, Stephanie Beatriz and the Encanto cast	25.2 million
January 22	"We Don't Talk About Bruno"	Carolina Gaitán, Mauro Castillo, Adassa, Rhenzy Feliz, Diane Guerrero, Stephanie Beatriz and the Encanto cast	29 million
January 29	"We Don't Talk About Bruno"	Carolina Gaitán, Mauro Castillo, Adassa, Rhenzy Feliz, Diane Guerrero, Stephanie Beatriz and the Encanto cast	32.4 million
February 5	"We Don't Talk About Bruno"	Carolina Gaitán, Mauro Castillo, Adassa, Rhenzy Feliz, Diane Guerrero, Stephanie Beatriz and the Encanto cast	34.9 million
February 12	"We Don't Talk About Bruno"	Carolina Gaitán, Mauro Castillo, Adassa, Rhenzy Feliz, Diane Guerrero, Stephanie Beatriz and the Encanto cast	37.6 million
February 19	"We Don't Talk About Bruno"	Carolina Gaitán, Mauro Castillo, Adassa, Rhenzy Feliz, Diane Guerrero, Stephanie Beatriz and the Encanto cast	35.6 million
February 26	"We Don't Talk About Bruno"	Carolina Gaitán, Mauro Castillo, Adassa, Rhenzy Feliz, Diane Guerrero, Stephanie Beatriz and the Encanto cast	32.2 million
March 5	"We Don't Talk About Bruno"	Carolina Gaitán, Mauro Castillo, Adassa, Rhenzy Feliz, Diane Guerrero, Stephanie Beatriz and the Encanto cast	29.9 million
March 12	"We Don't Talk About Bruno"	Carolina Gaitán, Mauro Castillo, Adassa, Rhenzy Feliz, Diane Guerrero, Stephanie Beatriz and the Encanto cast	26.3 million
March 19	"We Don't Talk About Bruno"	Carolina Gaitán, Mauro Castillo, Adassa, Rhenzy Feliz, Diane Guerrero, Stephanie Beatriz and the Encanto cast	24.9 million
March 26	"We Don't Talk About Bruno"	Carolina Gaitán, Mauro Castillo, Adassa, Rhenzy Feliz, Diane Guerrero, Stephanie Beatriz and the Encanto cast	22.2 million
April 2	"We Don't Talk About Bruno"	Carolina Gaitán, Mauro Castillo, Adassa, Rhenzy Feliz, Diane Guerrero, Stephanie Beatriz and the Encanto cast	19.3 million
April 9	"We Don't Talk About Bruno"	Carolina Gaitán, Mauro Castillo, Adassa, Rhenzy Feliz, Diane Guerrero, Stephanie Beatriz and the Encanto cast	18.6 million
April 16	"As It Was"	Harry Styles	43.8 million
April 23	"First Class"	Jack Harlow	54.6 million
April 30	"First Class"	Jack Harlow	34.6 million
May 7	"First Class"	Jack Harlow	29.1 million
May 14	"Wait for U"	Future featuring Drake and Tems	40.2 million
May 21	"Wait for U"	Future featuring Drake and Tems	31.5 million
May 28	"N95"	Kendrick Lamar	37.2 million
June 4	"As It Was"	Harry Styles	35.6 million
June 11	"Wait for U"	Future featuring Drake and Tems	31.5 million
June 18	"Running Up That Hill (A Deal With God)"	Kate Bush	29 million
June 25	"Wait for U"	Future featuring Drake and Tems	28.5 million
July 2	"Jimmy Cooks"	Drake featuring 21 Savage	42.2 million
July 9	"Jimmy Cooks"	Drake featuring 21 Savage	24.7 million
July 16	"Running Up That Hill (A Deal With God)"	Kate Bush	22.3 million
July 23	"Running Up That Hill (A Deal With God)"	Kate Bush	21.5 million
July 30	"Me Porto Bonito"	Bad Bunny and Chencho Corleone	21.1 million
August 6	"Me Porto Bonito"	Bad Bunny and Chencho Corleone	19.7 million
August 13	"Bad Habit"	Steve Lacy	20 million
August 20	"Staying Alive"	DJ Khaled featuring Drake and Lil Baby	23.5 million
August 27	"Super Freaky Girl"	Nicki Minaj	21.1 million
September 3	"Bad Habit"	Steve Lacy	20.8 million
September 10	"Bad Habit"	Steve Lacy	20.3 million
September 17	"Bad Habit"	Steve Lacy	20 million
September 24	"Super Freaky Girl"	Nicki Minaj	19.8 million
October 1	"Bad Habit"	Steve Lacy	19.6 million
October 8	"Unholy"	Sam Smith and Kim Petras	23.2 million
October 15	"Unholy"	Sam Smith and Kim Petras	23.8 million
October 22	"Unholy"	Sam Smith and Kim Petras	23.2 million
October 29	"Unholy"	Sam Smith and Kim Petras	25.3 million
November 5	"Anti-Hero"	Taylor Swift	59.7 million
November 12	"Anti-Hero"	Taylor Swift	35.6 million
November 19	"Rich Flex"	Drake and 21 Savage	58.9 million
November 26	"Rich Flex"	Drake and 21 Savage	36.1 million
December 3	"Rich Flex"	Drake and 21 Savage	30.9 million
December 10	"All I Want for Christmas Is You"	Mariah Carey	30.3 million
December 17	"All I Want for Christmas Is You"	Mariah Carey	36.2 million
December 24	"Kill Bill"	SZA	36.9 million
December 31	"All I Want for Christmas Is You"	Mariah Carey	48.7 million

== See also ==
- 2022 in American music
- List of Billboard Hot 100 number ones of 2022
