= List of Billboard Hot 100 number ones of 2023 =

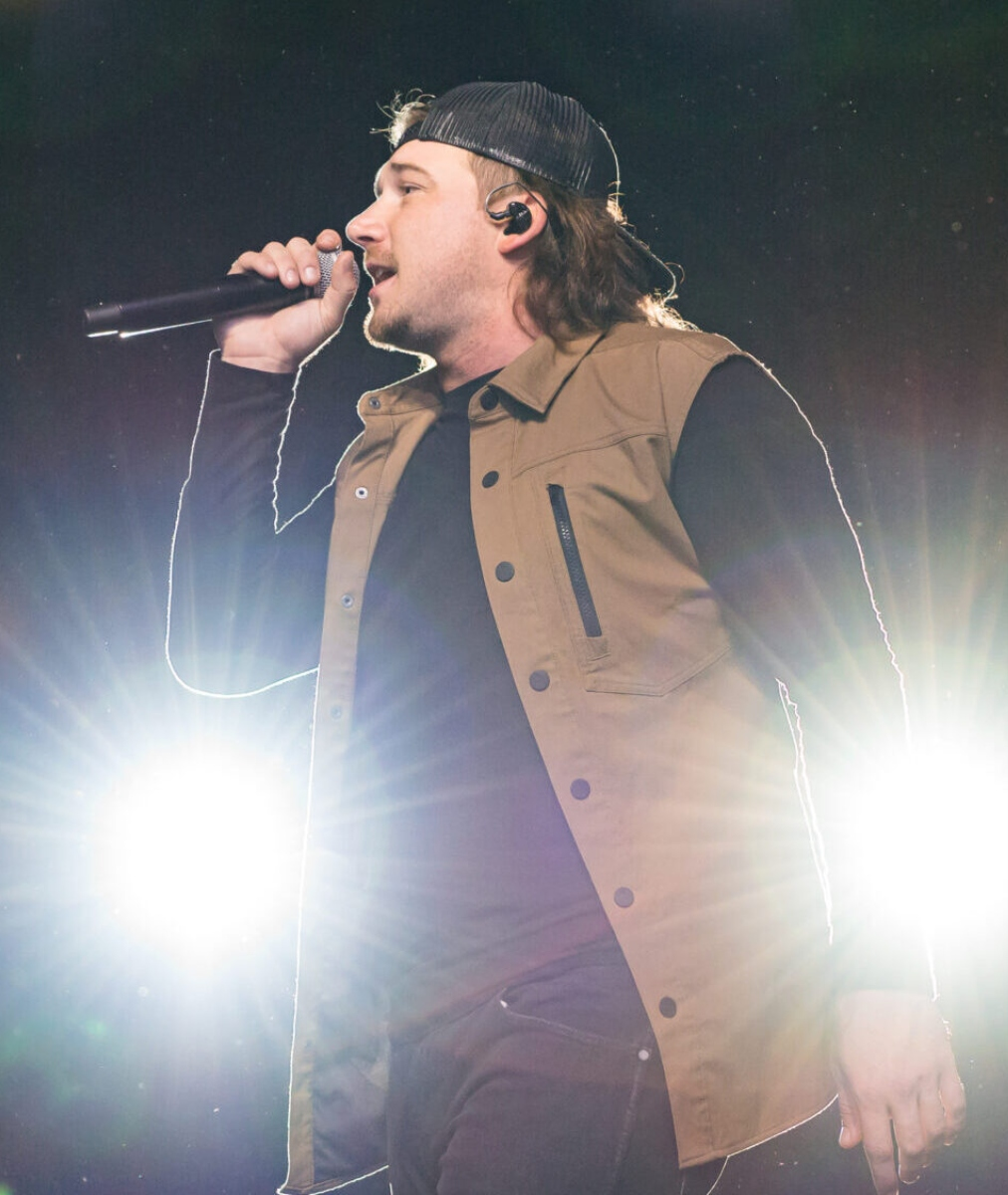
"Last Night" by Morgan Wallen is the longest running number-one song of 2023, with sixteen weeks atop the chart.

The Billboard Hot 100 is a chart that ranks the best-performing songs in the United States. Its data is compiled by Luminate Data and published by American music magazine Billboard. The chart is based on each song's weekly physical and digital sales collectively, the amount of airplay impressions it receives on American radio stations, and its audio and video streams on online digital music platforms.

"Last Night" by American country singer Morgan Wallen is the year's longest-running number-one song on the Hot 100 in 2023, having spent sixteen weeks at the top spot; it subsequently topped the Billboard Year-End Hot 100. "Flowers" by American singer Miley Cyrus is the longest running number-one by a female artist, ruling the Hot 100 for eight weeks. "Paint the Town Red" by Doja Cat became the first rap song to top the Hot 100 in over a year. (Note: Nicki Minaj's "Super Freaky Girl" topped the chart in August 2022.) American singer Brenda Lee became the oldest artist of all time to reach number one on the Hot 100 (age 78), when "Rockin' Around the Christmas Tree" (1958) topped the chart in December 2023; concurrently, the song also became the third holiday single to top the Hot 100 (Note: The other holiday number-one songs are "The Chipmunk Song (Christmas Don't Be Late)" by David Seville and the Chipmunks and "All I Want for Christmas Is You" by Mariah Carey.) and it broke the record for longest climb to the top spot of the Hot 100 since release (65 years), surpassing Mariah Carey's 1994 single "All I Want for Christmas Is You" (25 years).

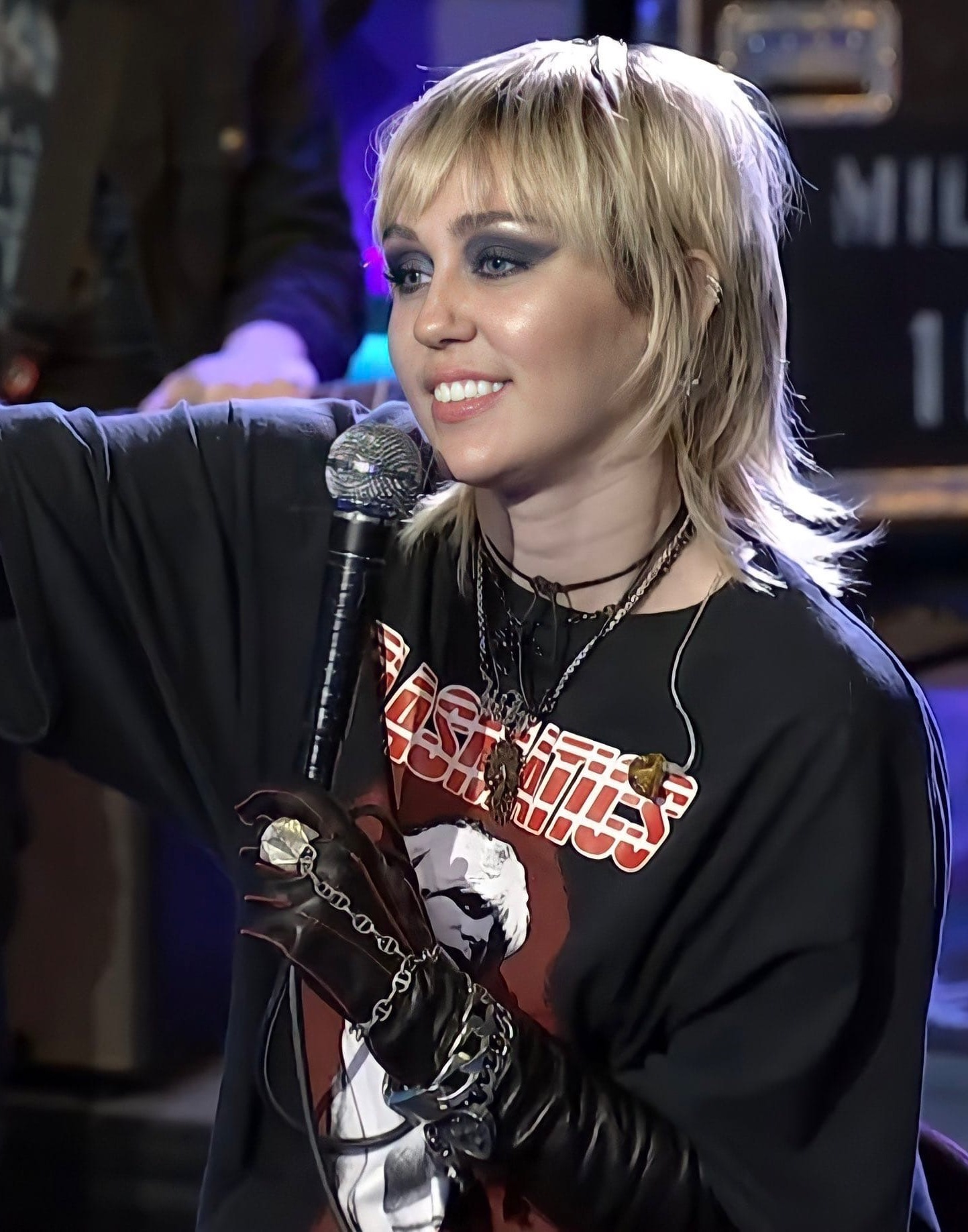
"Flowers" by Miley Cyrus is the year's longest running number-one song by a female artist, topping the chart for eight weeks.

Twenty artists charted at number one in 2023, with ten―Wallen, Jimin, SZA, Jung Kook, Latto, Jason Aldean, Oliver Anthony, Zach Bryan, Kacey Musgraves and J. Cole―reaching the top spot for the first time. SZA and Drake charted two number-one songs this year, whereas Taylor Swift became the first female artist in history to chart three number-one songs from three different albums on the Hot 100 in one calendar year. (Note: "Anti-Hero" from Midnights (2022), "Cruel Summer" from Lover (2019), and "Is It Over Now?" from 1989 (Taylor's Version) (2023).) Swift's "Is It Over Now?" (2023) dethroned her own "Cruel Summer" (2023) at number one on the chart dated November 11, 2023, and the vice versa occurred the next week, making Swift the first woman to replace herself at the top spot two and three times. She was the first ever artist to replace themselves three times on the Hot 100 in history. (Note: Swift is the first and only female artist to ever replace herself at the number-one spot of the Hot 100. In 2014, "Blank Space" replaced "Shake It Off" atop the chart.) Four country songs—Wallen's "Last Night", Aldean's "Try That in a Small Town", Anthony's "Rich Men North of Richmond", and "I Remember Everything" by Bryan and Musgraves—held the number-one spot on the Hot 100 in consecutive weeks for the first time ever.

== Chart history ==
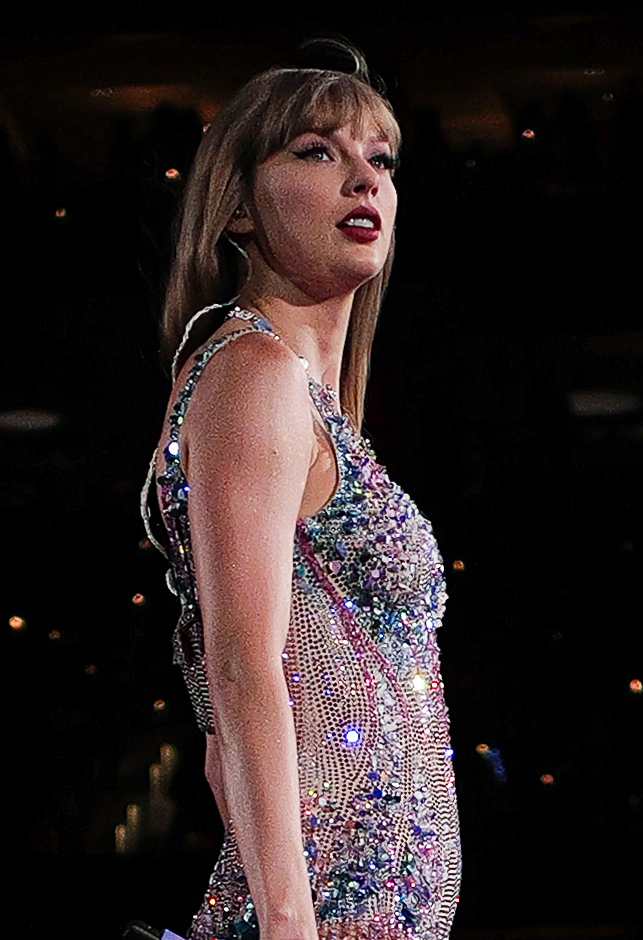
Taylor Swift topped the chart for seven weeks; "Cruel Summer" and "Is It Over Now?" marked the 10th and 11th number-one songs of her career, respectively.

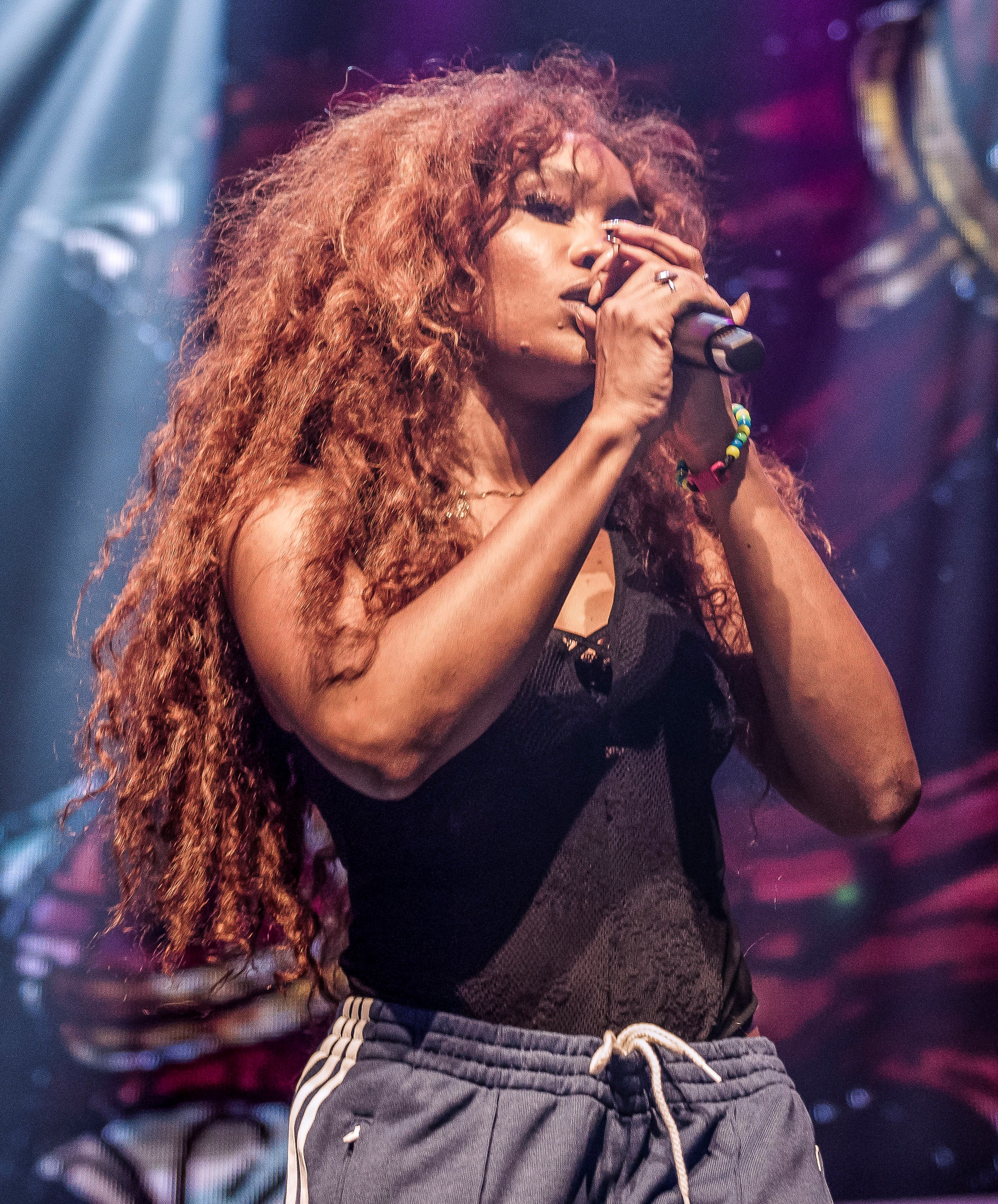
SZA achieved her first two number-one songs with "Kill Bill" and "Slime You Out".

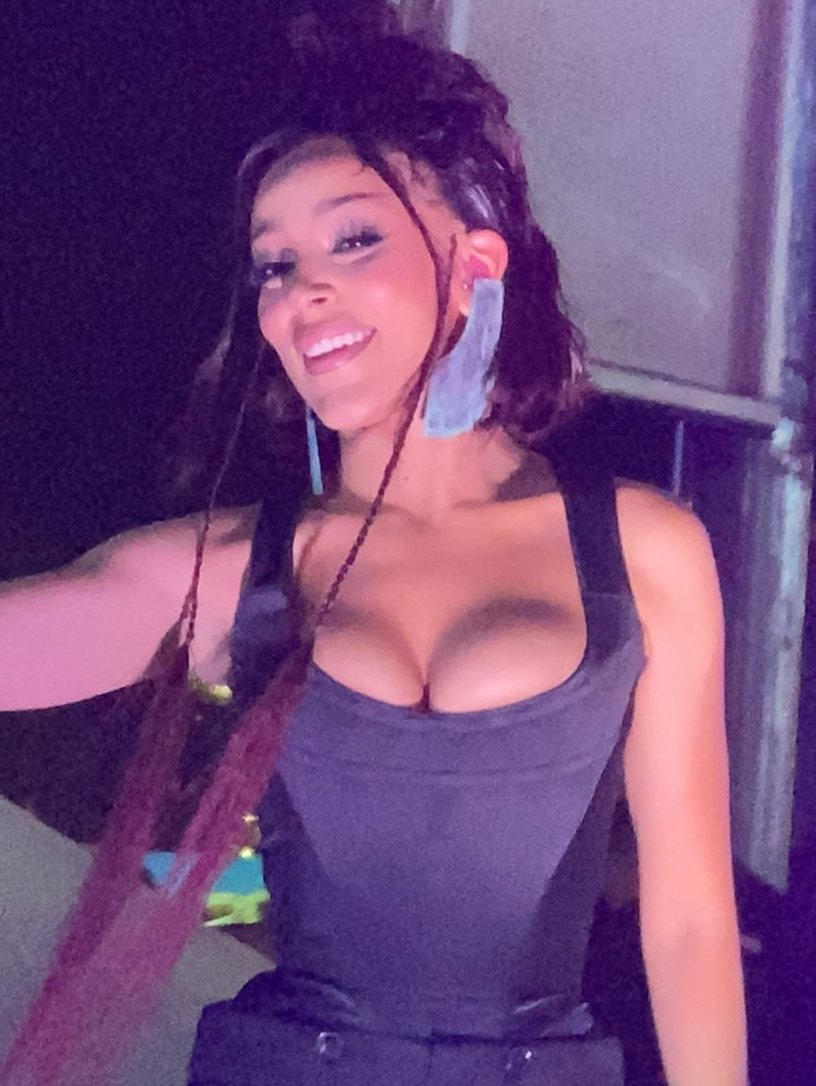
"Paint the Town Red" became Doja Cat's first solo number-one song and her second overall, spending three weeks atop the chart.

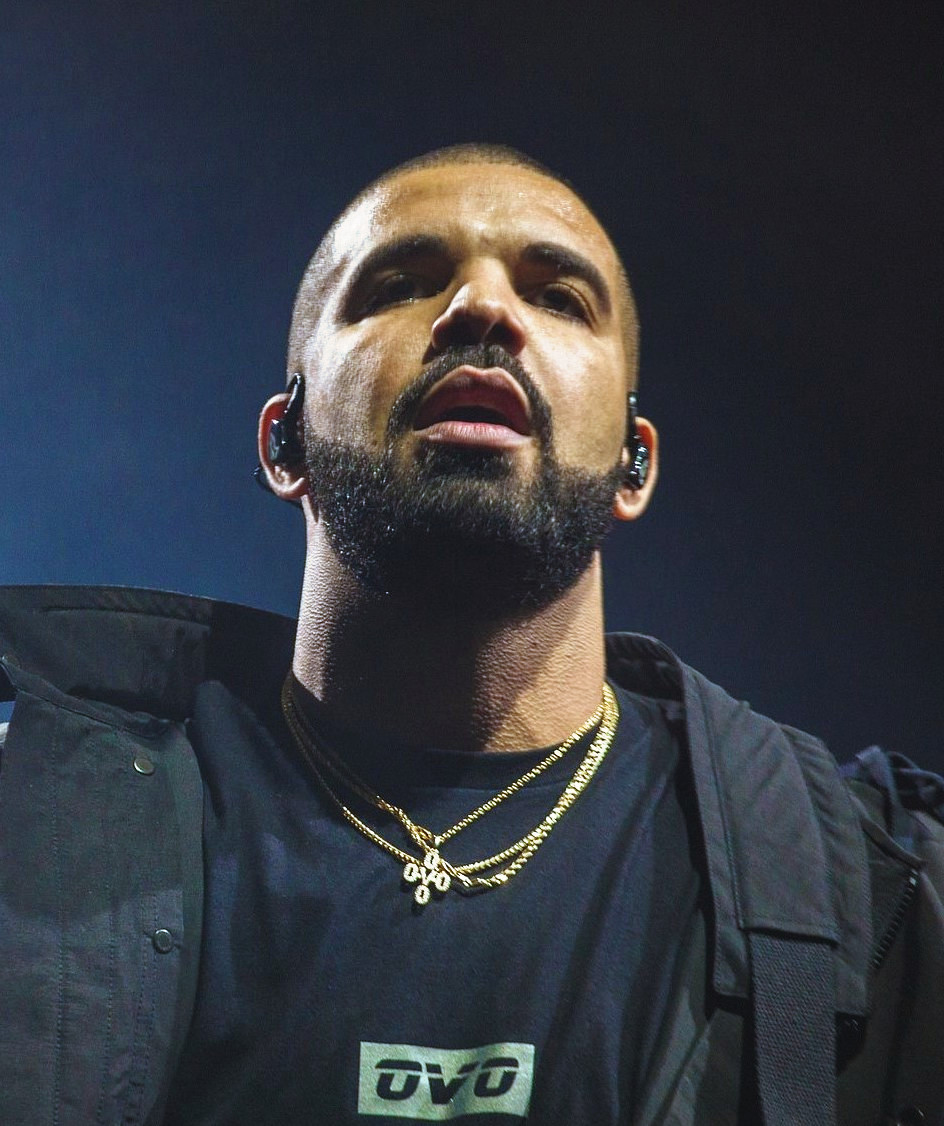
Drake scored his 12th and 13th number-one singles, with "Slime You Out" and "First Person Shooter".

Key
†	Indicates best-performing song of 2023

No.	Issue date	Song	Artist(s)	Ref.
re	January 7	"All I Want for Christmas Is You"	Mariah Carey	
re	January 14	"Anti-Hero"	Taylor Swift	
re	January 21	"Anti-Hero"	Taylor Swift	
1145	January 28	"Flowers"	Miley Cyrus	
1145	February 4	"Flowers"	Miley Cyrus	
1145	February 11	"Flowers"	Miley Cyrus	
1145	February 18	"Flowers"	Miley Cyrus	
1145	February 25	"Flowers"	Miley Cyrus	
1145	March 4	"Flowers"	Miley Cyrus	
1146	March 11	"Die for You"	The Weeknd and Ariana Grande	
1147	March 18	"Last Night" †	Morgan Wallen	
re	March 25	"Flowers"	Miley Cyrus	
re	April 1	"Flowers"	Miley Cyrus	
1148	April 8	"Like Crazy"	Jimin	
re	April 15	"Last Night" †	Morgan Wallen	
re	April 22	"Last Night" †	Morgan Wallen	
1149	April 29	"Kill Bill"	SZA	
re	May 6	"Last Night" †	Morgan Wallen	
re	May 13	"Last Night" †	Morgan Wallen	
re	May 20	"Last Night" †	Morgan Wallen	
re	May 27	"Last Night" †	Morgan Wallen	
re	June 3	"Last Night" †	Morgan Wallen	
re	June 10	"Last Night" †	Morgan Wallen	
re	June 17	"Last Night" †	Morgan Wallen	
re	June 24	"Last Night" †	Morgan Wallen	
re	July 1	"Last Night" †	Morgan Wallen	
re	July 8	"Last Night" †	Morgan Wallen	
1150	July 15	"Vampire"	Olivia Rodrigo	
re	July 22	"Last Night" †	Morgan Wallen	
1151	July 29	"Seven"	Jung Kook featuring Latto	
1152	August 5	"Try That in a Small Town"	Jason Aldean	
re	August 12	"Last Night" †	Morgan Wallen	
re	August 19	"Last Night" †	Morgan Wallen	
1153	August 26	"Rich Men North of Richmond"	Oliver Anthony Music	
1153	September 2	"Rich Men North of Richmond"	Oliver Anthony Music	
1154	September 9	"I Remember Everything"	Zach Bryan featuring Kacey Musgraves	
1155	September 16	"Paint the Town Red"	Doja Cat	
re	September 23	"Vampire"	Olivia Rodrigo	
1156	September 30	"Slime You Out"	Drake featuring SZA	
re	October 7	"Paint the Town Red"	Doja Cat	
re	October 14	"Paint the Town Red"	Doja Cat	
1157	October 21	"First Person Shooter"	Drake featuring J. Cole	
1158	October 28	"Cruel Summer"	Taylor Swift	
1158	November 4	"Cruel Summer"	Taylor Swift	
1159	November 11	"Is It Over Now?"	Taylor Swift	
re	November 18	"Cruel Summer"	Taylor Swift	
re	November 25	"Cruel Summer"	Taylor Swift	
1160	December 2	"Lovin on Me"	Jack Harlow	
1161	December 9	"Rockin' Around the Christmas Tree"	Brenda Lee	
1161	December 16	"Rockin' Around the Christmas Tree"	Brenda Lee	
re	December 23	"All I Want for Christmas Is You"	Mariah Carey	
re	December 30	"All I Want for Christmas Is You"	Mariah Carey	

== Number-one artists ==
List of number-one artists by total weeks at number one
Artist	Weeks at No. 1
Morgan Wallen	16
Miley Cyrus	8
Taylor Swift	7
Doja Cat	3
Mariah Carey	3
Oliver Anthony Music	2
Olivia Rodrigo	2
SZA	2
Drake	2
Brenda Lee	2
The Weeknd	1
Ariana Grande	1
Jimin	1
Jung Kook	1
Latto	1
Jason Aldean	1
Zach Bryan	1
Kacey Musgraves	1
J. Cole	1
Jack Harlow	1

== See also ==
- List of Billboard 200 number-one albums of 2023
- List of Billboard Global 200 number ones of 2023
- List of Billboard Hot 100 top-ten singles in 2023
- List of Billboard Hot 100 number-one singles of the 2020s
- Billboard Year-End Hot 100 singles of 2023
- 2023 in American music
