= Question...? =

2022 promotional single by Taylor Swift

Promotional single by Taylor Swift

from the album Midnights
- Released: October 25, 2022
- Studio: Rough Customer (Brooklyn); Electric Lady (New York)
- Genre: Electropop; synth-pop
- Length: 3:30
- Label: Republic
- Songwriters: Taylor Swift; Jack Antonoff
- Producers: Taylor Swift; Jack Antonoff

Lyric video
- "Question...?" on YouTube

"Question...?" is a song by the American singer-songwriter Taylor Swift from her tenth studio album, Midnights (2022). Written and produced by Swift and Jack Antonoff, it is a minimalist electropop and synth-pop track that incorporates synth tones and sharp drum machine beats. The song contains a vocal sample of Swift's 2014 track "Out of the Woods". In the lyrics of "Question...?", Swift's narrator confronts an ex-lover with questions regarding their past behaviors and what could have happened differently. Several critics opined that the track referenced songs from Swift's previous albums 1989 (2014) and Reputation (2017).

"Question...?" was released as a limited-time digital copy exclusively via Swift's website on October 25, 2022. In reviews of Midnights, critics who picked the track as an album highlight lauded its lyrical details and production. The sampling of "Out of the Woods" in "Question...?" won an iHeartRadio Music Award in 2023. "Question...?" peaked at number 11 on the Billboard Global 200 and within the top 10 on charts of Canada, the Philippines, Singapore, and the US. It received certifications in Australia, Canada, and the UK. Swift performed the track twice on her sixth concert tour, the Eras Tour.

== Background and release ==
The American singer-songwriter Taylor Swift created her tenth original studio album, Midnights, a collection of songs about her nocturnal ruminations, detailing a wide range of emotions that come to her during sleepless nights, such as regret, lust, nostalgia, contentment, and self-loathing. She produced the album's standard edition with Jack Antonoff. Its track listing was revealed via a thirteen-episode video series called Midnights Mayhem with Me on the platform TikTok; each video contained the title of one track at a time. Track seven's title, "Question...?", was revealed in the September 26, 2022, episode.

Republic Records released Midnights on October 21, 2022, and "Question...?" was released exclusively onto Swift's official website as a limited-time digital copy available for download on October 25. The instrumental version was made available for purchase two days later. Swift performed "Question...?" twice on her sixth concert tour, the Eras Tour. She sang an acoustic version on May 20, 2023, in Foxborough, Massachusetts, and as part of a mashup with "The Archer" on July 4, 2024, in Amsterdam, the Netherlands.

== Composition ==
=== Music ===
"Question...?"
A sample of the second refrain that shows the synths and drum machine beats speeding up

Swift wrote "Question...?" with Antonoff. At 3 minutes and 30 seconds long, "Question...?" is a minimalist electropop and synth-pop song. Set over a tempo of 109 beats per minute, it begins with a filtered drum machine pattern and a vocal sample of the lyric "I remember" from Swift's 2014 song "Out of the Woods" from her album 1989. Its verses are driven by subdued Juno-6 synth chords, clipped drum machine beats, and a distant layer of synths. Critics describe the drum sounds as sharp and crisp. From the second refrain, which starts at 1:50, the drums and synths become louder. In the bridge, Swift's vocals are processed with a harmonizer and a vocoder. The final refrain contains sounds of a crowd cheering, credited to Antonoff, his sister Rachel, Swift's brother Austin, and the actor Dylan O'Brien.

=== Lyrics and interpretations ===
In "Question...?", Swift's narrator ruminates on a relationship that ended bitterly. The song depicts the narrator as a "good girl" and her ex-lover as a "sad boy"; they met in a big city and both made bad decisions. In the refrain, the narrator confronts the ex-lover with multiple questions about their past behaviors, such as not staying the night with her and not fighting hard enough to keep her when he still had a chance ("Did you leave her house in the middle of the night? Did you wish you'd put up more of a fight when she said it was too much?"). She ultimately asks the ex-lover if he is still attracted to her ("Do you wish you could still touch her?"). According to Rob Sheffield of Rolling Stone, Swift's narrator "wishes she didn't already know the answers". Towards the conclusion, the narrator mocks her ex-lover's new girlfriend ("And what's that that I heard, that you're still with her, that's nice/ I'm sure that's what's suitable/ And right"), with Swift's vocals featuring heavier digital manipulation and the production becoming more intense with louder beats, pronounced synth tones, and dense echoing effects, which symbolize how the memories are distorted in the narrator's mind.

There were comparisons of the track's production and theme to those of Swift's past songs. Several reviews thought that the sound of "Question...?" evoked the styles of tracks from 1989 such as "Out of the Woods" and "Blank Space". Carl Wilson from Slate wrote that the resemblance to "Blank Space" is in how Swift interpolates her "descending-scale" cadence from its bridge. The late-night encounters with a love interest are similar to those portrayed in the 1989 songs "Style", "All You Had to Do Was Stay", and "How You Get the Girl", and the lyric mentioning the couple kissing "in a crowded room" references "Dress" from the album Reputation (2017). In Billboard, Becky Kaminsky wrote that "Question...?" resembles Reputation by portraying a version of Swift that "isn't afraid to hold back". According to the English literature scholar Maggie Laurel Boyd, "Question...?" revisits the memories mentioned in "Out of the Woods", but the narrator is more upfront: she asserts that she still remembers what happened and discerns new meanings in old stories.

Several critics analyzed the lyrics concerning women's psychology in dating and romance. The music critic Annie Zaleski summed up the narrative as a demand for closure from an ex-lover who had moved on, and she wrote that the dynamic build-up towards the end represented the narrator's jealousy towards her ex-lover's new love and urgent needs for clear answers. Alejandra Gularte of Vulture thought that the track was relatable for those who have an anxious attachment. NPR's Ann Powers cited the lyrics, "Did you ever have someone kiss you in a crowded room/ And every single one of your friends was making fun of you/ But 15 seconds later they were clapping too?", as an example that portrays romantic persuasion and betrayal. For Powers, the said lines encapsulate how women's anxiety and uncertainty in love can be exacerbated by others' perceptions of and desires for them.

== Reception ==
Positive reviews of "Question...?" focused on its lyrics. Liam E Semler, a professor in early modern English literature, considered it a complex track worthy of detailed analysis. Jon Caramanica of The New York Times and Alexis Petridis of The Guardian selected the song as one of the better album tracks lyrically; the latter complimented its "subtle, brilliant touches", particularly when the lyrics "simultaneously speed up their rhyme and stop rhyming" to depict a drunken conversation. Zaleski and Powers regarded "Question...?" as a relatable song; the latter hailed it as "the kind of story song only Swift can write" for capturing the painful emotional sentiments experienced by many women with the details "so acutely that it stings". Caramanica and Powers said that the track displays Swift's tartness, a quality that the latter thought to evoke the poet Dorothy Parker. Wilson and The Atlantic's Spencer Kornhaber were moved by the nostalgia and wistfulness of the storytelling, and The A.V. Club's Saloni Gajjar wrote that it contains "classic Swift charm and potent use of metaphors".

A few critics also praised the production. Bobby Olivier from Spin described the track as a "banger" that has a radio hit potential, and Ellen Johnson of Paste considered the song meticulously produced, with a more nuanced and restrained production compared to common pop music. In a less welcoming review, Craig Jenkins from Vulture deemed the refrain "cloying" that blemishes an otherwise fine album. Placing "Question...?" last in his ranking of all 13 Midnights tracks, Jason Lipshutz of Billboard wrote that while it "doesn't fully congeal, the song boasts some fascinating tidbits to pore over".

The sample of "Out of the Woods" in "Question...?" won "Favorite Use of a Sample" at the 2023 iHeartRadio Music Awards. "Question...?" peaked at number 11 on the Billboard Global 200. In the US, the song debuted and peaked at number seven on the Billboard Hot 100. It was one of the Midnights tracks that made Swift the first artist to occupy the top 10 of the Hot 100 the same week, and the woman with the most top-10 entries (40 total), exceeding Madonna (38 top-10 songs). On the Digital Songs chart, it became Swift's record-extending 24th number-one song, propelled by the limited-time downloads. "Question...?" peaked in the top 10 in Canada, the Philippines, Singapore, and Malaysia; and in the top 20 in Australia, Vietnam, Iceland, and Portugal. The track was certified silver in the UK, gold in Brazil and Canada, and platinum in Australia.

== Credits and personnel ==
Credits are adapted from the liner notes of Midnights.

Studios

- Recorded at Rough Customer Studio, Brooklyn, and Electric Lady Studios, New York City
- Mixed at MixStar Studio, Virginia Beach, Virginia
- Mastered at Sterling Sound, Edgewater, New Jersey
- Dominik Rivinius's performance recorded by Ken Lewis at Neon Wave Studio, Pirmasens, Germany
- Evan Smith's performance recorded by himself at Pleasure Hill Recording, Portland, Maine
- Sean Hutchinson's performance recorded by himself at Hutchinson Sound, Brooklyn

Personnel

- Taylor Swift – vocals, songwriter, producer
- Jack Antonoff – songwriter, producer, programming, percussion, Juno 6, Mellotron, background vocals, recording, crowd applause
- Dominik Rivinius – drums
- Evan Smith – drums
- Sean Hutchinson – drums, percussion
- Rachel Antonoff – crowd applause
- Austin Swift – crowd applause
- Dylan O'Brien – crowd applause
- Megan Searl – assistant engineer
- John Sher – assistant engineer
- John Rooney – assistant engineer
- Serban Ghenea – mixing
- Bryce Bordone – assistant mix engineer
- Randy Merrill – mastering
- Laura Sisk – recording
- David Hart – recording
- Ken Lewis – recording

== Charts ==
Chart performance for "Question...?"
Chart (2022–2023)	Peak position
Australia (ARIA)	11
Canada Hot 100 (Billboard)	10
Czech Republic Singles Digital (ČNS IFPI)	40
France (SNEP)	139
Global 200 (Billboard)	11
Greece International (IFPI)	17
Iceland (Tónlistinn)	20
Ireland (Billboard)	10
Lithuania (AGATA)	36
Malaysia (Billboard)	14
Malaysia International (RIM)	8
Philippines (Billboard)	7
Portugal (AFP)	21
Singapore (RIAS)	7
Slovakia Singles Digital (ČNS IFPI)	46
Spain (Promusicae)	62
Sweden (Sverigetopplistan)	42
Swiss Streaming (Schweizer Hitparade)	44
UK (Billboard)	12
UK Audio Streaming (Official Charts)	12
UK Singles Downloads (Official Charts)	96
US Billboard Hot 100	7
Vietnam Hot 100 (Billboard)	15

== Certifications ==
Certifications for "Question...?"
Region	Certification	Certified units/sales
Australia (ARIA)	Platinum	70,000^{‡}
Brazil (Pro-Música Brasil)	Gold	20,000^{‡}
Canada (Music Canada)	Gold	40,000^{‡}
New Zealand (RMNZ)	Gold	15,000^{‡}
United Kingdom (BPI)	Silver	200,000^{‡}
^{‡} Sales+streaming figures based on certification alone.

== Release history ==
Release dates and formats for "Question...?"
Region	Date	Format	Version	Ref.
United States	October 25, 2022	Digital download	Original	
United States	October 27, 2022	Digital download	Instrumental	

== See also ==
- List of Digital Song Sales number ones of 2022
