= Is It Over Now? =

2023 single by Taylor Swift

Single by Taylor Swift

from the album 1989 (Taylor's Version)
- Written: 2014
- Released: October 31, 2023
- Studio: Conway Recording (Hollywood); Electric Lady (New York); Rough Costumer (Brooklyn); Sharp Sonics (Los Angeles)
- Genre: Electropop; power ballad; synth-pop
- Length: 3:49
- Label: Republic
- Songwriters: Taylor Swift; Jack Antonoff
- Producers: Taylor Swift; Jack Antonoff

Taylor Swift singles chronology
"'Slut!'" (2023)	"Is It Over Now?" (2023)	"Fortnight" (2024)

Lyric video
- "Is It Over Now?" on YouTube

"Is It Over Now?" (Note: Subtitled (Taylor's Version) (From the Vault)) is a song by the American singer-songwriter Taylor Swift. Written by Swift and Jack Antonoff, the song was intended for but ultimately left out of Swift's fifth studio album, 1989 (2014). It was released as part of the 2023 re-recording, 1989 (Taylor's Version). "Is It Over Now?" is an electropop and synth-pop power ballad composed of dense reverb, synthesizers, and an echoing drum machine. Republic Records released the song to US contemporary hit radio on October 31, 2023.

The song depicts Swift's complex emotions in the aftermath of a failed romance, discussing feelings of disappointment and resentment that ensue. The lyricism features rhetorical questions and tight internal rhymes. Critics drew several parallels between "Is It Over Now?" and "Out of the Woods" (2014), a single from 1989. They praised "Is It Over Now?" for its enlivening composition and storytelling lyrics; many deemed the song an album highlight and one of Swift's best works. Multiple publications included it in their lists of the best songs of 2023.

Commercially, "Is It Over Now?" debuted atop the Billboard Hot 100, marking Swift's 11th number-one single in the US; also her sixth number-one debut, the song replacing her own "Cruel Summer" (2023) from the top spot, making Swift the first female soloist to replace herself atop the chart twice. (Note: "Blank Space" (2014) replaced "Shake It Off" (2014) from the top spot of the Hot 100.) Elsewhere, "Is It Over Now?" topped the singles charts of Australia, Canada, New Zealand, and the United Kingdom, as well as the Billboard Global 200 and the US Pop Airplay chart. Swift performed "Is It Over Now?" five times on the Eras Tour (2023–2024).

== Background and production ==
After signing a new contract with Republic Records, the singer-songwriter Taylor Swift began re-recording her first six studio albums in November 2020. The decision followed a public dispute in 2019 between Swift and the talent manager Scooter Braun, who acquired Big Machine Records, including the masters of Swift's albums which the label had released. By re-recording the albums, Swift had full ownership of the new masters, which enabled her to control the licensing of her songs for commercial use and therefore substituted the Big Machine–owned masters. From April 2021 to July 2023, Swift released three re-recorded albums of her earlier releases: Fearless (Taylor's Version), Red (Taylor's Version), and Speak Now (Taylor's Version); each album also featured several unreleased "From the Vault" tracks that she had written but left out of the original albums' track listings.

Republic Records released Swift's fourth re-recorded album, 1989 (Taylor's Version), on October 27, 2023, on the ninth anniversary of her fifth original studio album, 1989 (2014). The original album was Swift's first "official pop" album after she had marketed her first four albums to country radio, and it transformed her artistry and image from country to pop. As with her other re-recorded projects, 1989 (Taylor's Version) features five newly recorded "From the Vault" tracks that Swift had written but left out of the original track listing. "Is It Over Now?" is one of the vault tracks Swift had written in 2014 but excluded from the track-list of 1989. She wrote and produced the track with Jack Antonoff for 1989 (Taylor's Version).

Antonoff and the audio engineers Laura Sisk and David Hart, assisted by Jack Manning, Megan Searl, and Jon Sher, recorded the track at four studios: Conway Recording Studios, Sharp Sonics (Los Angeles), Electric Lady Studios, and Rough Customer (New York). Antonoff also programmed the song, played synthesizers, and provided background vocals. Zem Audu played additional synthesizers and recorded his part at Audu Studio (Brooklyn). Sean Hutchinson and Micchael Riddleberger played and recorded drums at Hutchinson Sound Studio (Brooklyn). Mikey Freedom Hart played synthesizer which he recorded at Big Mercy Studio (Brooklyn). Evan Smith played saxophone and recorded his part at Pleasure Hill (Portland). The track was mixed by Serban Ghenea at MixStar Studios (Virginia Beach, Virginia) and mastered by Randy Merrill at Sterling Sound (Edgewater, New Jersey).

== Composition ==
A song based on storytelling, "Is It Over Now?" depicts Swift's experience with rumors and disappointment in the aftermath of a romantic relationship. The narrator memorizes the details ("Red blood, white snow/ Blue dress on a boat") and clings onto the relationship ("Let's fast forward to 300 takeout coffees later/ I see your profile and your smile on unsuspecting waiters/ You dream of my mouth before it called you a 'lying traitor'"). She accuses him of cheating with resentment and anger ("You search in every model's bed for something greater", "At least I had the decency to keep my nights out of sight"), but, at one point, admits that she too has cheated on him. She later confesses to having fantasized about "jumping off of very tall somethings" to win his attention again. The on-again-off-again relationship leaves her wondering, "Is it over now?", but she ultimately accepts that it has ended. The lines consist of internal rhymes in strict meter ("I think about jumping/ Off of very tall somethings/ Just to see you come running/ And say the one thing/ I've been wanting").

Music critics likened "Is It Over Now?" to some of Swift's past songs; several connected the song to or described it as a thematic continuation of "Out of the Woods", a single from 1989, because both songs address the uneasy situation of a past relationship and feature details regarding an accident. (Note: Attributed to Entertainment Weekly's Lauren Huff, and Rolling Stone's Angie Martoccio) Bobby Olivier from NJ.com wrote that the feelings of "sorrow, fragility and rage" resembled the sentiments of "All Too Well" (2012), while Ed Power from the i felt the song was a "spiritual sequel" to "I Knew You Were Trouble" (2012). For Business Insider journalist Callie Ahlgrim, the question "Is it over now?" is rhetorical and represents an existential crisis. Meanwhile, Entertainment Weekly's Lauren Huff opined that the answer to that question was a definite yes, albeit "not the good kind". Some media outlets speculated that the song addressed Swift's relationship with the English singer Harry Styles, which ended in 2013.

"Is It Over Now?"
A sample of "Is It Over Now?", an electropop power ballad with dense reverb, synths, and echoing drum machines

Musically, "Is It Over Now?" is a power ballad. It has an electropop and synth-pop production that incorporates dense reverb, synths, and echoing drum machine beats. Antonoff used analog synthesizers including Moog and Juno-6. The final verse features stuttering drums. The song is written in the key of C major in common time with a tempo of 100 bpm. Swift's vocals span G_{3} to D_{5}. The hook has a vocal sample; The Daily Telegraph's Neil McCormick wrote that it was "an odd squawking sample", while The Guardian's Rachel described it as "era-specific alien-like". Huff said that the sound was "vaguely reminiscent of a birdcall echoing in a forest", which leaves the impression that the couple in the lyrics "never did make it out of the woods". Antonoff addressed the sound and said that he used Moog and Juno 6 synthesizers to create it. According to Ahlgrim, Swift sings with breathless vocals, which makes the song "sound essential, urgent, as though it's literally gushing out of her".

Shaad D'Souza from Pitchfork commented that although most parts of "Is It Over Now?" sonically aligned with 1989, some felt as if they were developed later and could fit into Swift's 2022 album Midnights. Variety critic Chris Willman wrote that the production had a "mid-tempo throb" that keeps the song from coming off as a "total [tragedy]". For Rob Sheffield of Rolling Stone, the "spooky synth-drone" in the intro and the build-up into a "brooding powerhouse mediation on love and loss" made the track comparable to Swift's songs "The Archer" (from Lover, 2019) and "Labyrinth" (from Midnights, 2022). The Financial Times critic Ludovic Hunter-Tilney opined that the synths and drums were in line with the 1980s-inspired sound of the album, whereas People's Jeff Nelson said they evoked both "Out of the Woods" and "Labyrinth".

== Release and commercial performance ==
"Is It Over Now?" was released as part of 1989 (Taylor's Version) on October 27, 2023. Republic Records released the song to US contemporary hit radio as a single on October 31. Swift performed "Is It Over Now?" for the first time in a mashup with "Out of the Woods" at the Buenos Aires and Paris stops of her Eras Tour (2023–2024), and included "Clean" (2014) as part of the mashup during the London stop of the tour. She also sang the song in a mashup with her track "I Wish You Would" (2014) at the tour's Sydney stop. Most recently, during the New Orleans stop of the tour, Swift performed it with the American singer-songwriter Sabrina Carpenter in a mashup with her 2024 singles, "Espresso" and "Please Please Please".

In the United States, "Is It Over Now?" debuted atop the Billboard Hot 100, marking Swift's 11th number-one song on the chart and making her the first female artist and solo artist to have three different number ones from three different albums in a calendar year. The single succeeded Swift's single "Cruel Summer" at the number-one position, making Swift the first woman to succeed herself a second time, a feat she first achieved with "Shake It Off" and "Blank Space" in 2014. After being promoted to US radio, "Is It Over Now?" debuted at number 38 on the Pop Airplay chart. It subsequently topped the chart in March 2024, marking Swift's record-extending 13th number-one song in the US pop radio format.

For markets outside the United States, "Is It Over Now?" peaked at number five on the Billboard Global Excl. US chart. The single debuted at number one on the singles charts of Australia, Canada, New Zealand, and the United Kingdom. On the Billboard Global 200, the single became Swift's fourth number-one song, extending her record for the most chart toppers among female artists. It peaked in the top 10 of singles charts in Ireland (number 2), Singapore (number 4), the Philippines (number 6), and the United Arab Emirates (number 10). The single also reached the top 20 on the charts of several European territories, peaking at number 11 in Norway, number 15 in Sweden, number 16 in Portugal, number 18 in Austria, and number 20 in Lithuania.

== Critical reception ==
Music critics acclaimed "Is It Over Now?" for its production and Swift's narrative songwriting. In reviews of 1989 (Taylor's Version), a multitude of critics selected it as the best vault track; (Note: Attributed to Ahlgrim, the i's Ed Power, The Daily Telegraph's Neil McCormick, NJ.com's Bobby Olivier, and The Line of Best Fit's Kelsey Barnes) Rolling Stone critic Angie Martoccio picked it as an album highlight. Rob Sheffield, also of Rolling Stone, deemed the track "[Swift's] greatest vault stunner yet". USA Today journalist Melissa Ruggieri lauded the song for featuring "an ethereal melody and the sting of a Swift scorned". The Line of Best Fit's Kelsey Barnes and Clash's Alex Berry commented that the track not only had a catchy and engaging production but also displayed intricate songwriting; the former said it showcased Swift's "knack for narrative building" and the latter deemed it one of Swift's "most introspective pieces". Billboard critic Jason Lipshutz summed up that the song excelled in storytelling: "the characters and their circumstances feel instantly relatable, and the ending feels earned." Olivier and Ahlgrim also lauded the production, and the former particularly highlighted the "top-tier" bridge. Neil McCormick of The Daily Telegraph wrote of the song: "It's the kind of dazzling songcraft and pointed delivery that reminds us that, when it comes to Swift, we should accept no substitutes."

A few critics were similarly favorable but to a lesser extent. In the Los Angeles Times, Mikael Wood ranked "Is It Over Now?" fourth out of the five vault tracks and said that the song displayed Swift's accountability but "without enough of the self-flagellating wit" of her previous single "Anti-Hero" (2022). D'Souza remarked that the track was one of the vault songs that "can be encumbered by their wordiness" but succeeded in producing "the kind of bittersweet gems that are Swift's specialty". Adam White of The Independent considered "Is It Over Now?" one of the vault tracks that were "mid-tier Swift" but still turned out to be "some nuggets of gold".

A number of publications included "Is It Over Now?" on their lists of the best songs of 2023. Callie Ahlgrim of Business Insider placed the track at number three and deemed it a "sublime distillation of Swift's ideology". Rolling Stone's Rob Sheffield and Angie Martoccio ranked the song at number 5 and number 19 respectively; Martoccio said that it condensed more imagery into a few minutes than an entire book a prestigious novelist could have made. Billboard's Hannah Dailey listed the song at number 33 and viewed it as the highlight of 1989 (Taylor's Version). i-D placed "Is It Over Now?" at number 75, and GQ included it in their unranked list—the latter thought the song was "undeniable" and emblematic of a "Swift mega-smash".

=== Awards and nominations ===
Year	Award	Category	Result	Ref.
2024	iHeartRadio Music Awards	Best Lyrics	Won	

== Personnel ==
Credits are adapted from the liner notes of 1989 (Taylor's Version).

- Taylor Swift – vocals, songwriter, producer
- Jack Antonoff – producer, songwriter, recording engineer, synthesizer, programming, background vocals
- Zem Audu – synthesizer, synthesizer recording
- Bryce Bordon – mix engineer
- Serban Ghenea – mixing
- Mikey Freedom Hart – synthesizer
- David Hart – recording
- Sean Hutchinson – drums, drum recording
- Jack Manning – assistant recording engineer
- Randy Merrill – mastering
- Michael Riddleberger – drums, drum recording
- Megan Searl – assistant recording engineer
- Laura Sisk – recording
- Jon Sher – assistant recording engineer
- Evan Smith – saxophone

== Charts ==
=== Weekly charts ===
Weekly chart performance for "Is It Over Now?"
Chart (2023–2024)	Peak position
Australia (ARIA)	1
Austria (Ö3 Austria Top 40)	18
Brazil Hot 100 (Billboard)	71
Canada Hot 100 (Billboard)	1
Canada AC (Billboard)	3
Canada CHR/Top 40 (Billboard)	3
Canada Hot AC (Billboard)	4
Croatia (Billboard)	16
Czech Republic Singles Digital (ČNS IFPI)	43
Denmark (Tracklisten)	27
Estonia Airplay (TopHit)	1
Finland Airplay (Radiosoittolista)	19
France (SNEP)	129
Germany (GfK)	51
Germany Airplay (GfK)	3
Global 200 (Billboard)	1
Greece International (IFPI)	6
Hungary (Single Top 40)	38
Iceland (Tónlistinn)	24
India International (IMI)	17
Ireland (IRMA)	2
Italy (FIMI)	93
Japan Hot Overseas (Billboard Japan)	19
Latvia Airplay (LaIPA)	7
Lebanon Airplay (Lebanese Top 20)	10
Lithuania (AGATA)	20
Luxembourg (Billboard)	21
Malaysia (Billboard)	18
Malaysia International (RIM)	14
MENA (IFPI)	13
Netherlands (Single Top 100)	23
Netherlands (Tipparade)	7
New Zealand (Recorded Music NZ)	1
Nigeria (TurnTable Top 100)	53
Norway (VG-lista)	11
Philippines (Billboard)	6
Poland (Polish Streaming Top 100)	52
Portugal (AFP)	16
San Marino (SMRTV Top 50)	7
Singapore (RIAS)	4
Slovakia Airplay (ČNS IFPI)	12
Slovakia Singles Digital (ČNS IFPI)	38
Spain (Promusicae)	73
Sweden (Sverigetopplistan)	15
Switzerland (Schweizer Hitparade)	37
UAE (IFPI)	10
UK Singles (Official Charts)	1
US Billboard Hot 100	1
US Adult Contemporary (Billboard)	13
US Adult Pop Airplay (Billboard)	1
US Dance Airplay (Billboard)	17
US Pop Airplay (Billboard)	1
Vietnam (Vietnam Hot 100)	48

=== Year-end charts ===
2024 year-end chart performance for "Is It Over Now?"
Chart (2024)	Position
Canada (Canadian Hot 100)	26
Estonia Airplay (TopHit)	73
Global 200 (Billboard)	124
US Billboard Hot 100	33
US Adult Contemporary (Billboard)	22
US Adult Pop Airplay (Billboard)	9
US Pop Airplay (Billboard)	14

2025 year-end chart performance for "Is It Over Now?"
Chart (2025)	Position
Canada AC (Billboard)	76

== Certifications ==
Certifications for "Is It Over Now?"
Region	Certification	Certified units/sales
Australia (ARIA)	2× Platinum	140,000^{‡}
Brazil (Pro-Música Brasil)	3× Platinum	120,000^{‡}
New Zealand (RMNZ)	Platinum	30,000^{‡}
United Kingdom (BPI)	Platinum	600,000^{‡}
^{‡} Sales+streaming figures based on certification alone.

== Release history ==
Release dates and formats for "Is It Over Now?"
Region	Date	Format	Label(s)	Ref.
United States	October 31, 2023	Contemporary hit radio	Republic	
United States	November 6, 2023	Hot adult contemporary radio	Republic	
Italy	November 30, 2023	Radio airplay	Universal	
