= Titan Casket =

American casket company

- Type: Private
- Industry: Death care services
- Founded: 2016
- Founder: Scott Ginsberg, Joshua Siegel, and Elizabeth Siegel
- Headquarters: Boston, Massachusetts
- Website: titancasket.com

Titan Casket is a direct-to-customer casket provider headquartered in Boston, Massachusetts.

== History and overview ==
Titan Casket was founded in 2016 as a vendor on Amazon by Scott Ginsberg. In 2018, he reached out to co-founders, Joshua Siegel and Elizabeth Siegel, and the three officially launched the company in January 2020. In June 2022, Titan Casket raised $3.5 million in seed-round funding from Reformation Partners.

The company designs and manufactures the caskets at its warehouses in the US and sends them directly to the families of the end user at the funeral homes. It has also partnered with retailers including Amazon, Costco, Walmart, and Sam’s Club to sell their caskets.
