= List of Billboard 200 number-one albums of 2023 =

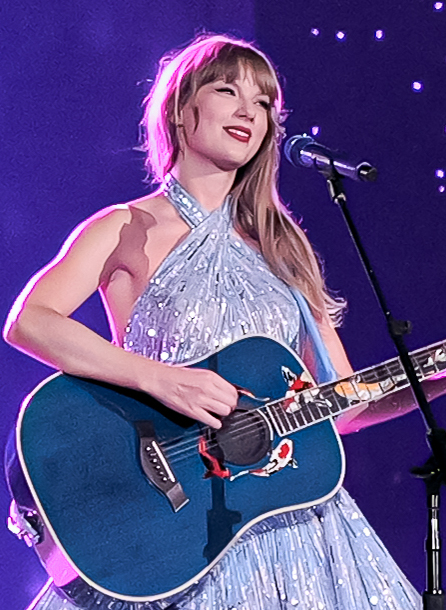
Taylor Swift topped the chart for seven weeks with three different albums in 2023; one of them, 1989 (Taylor's Version), became the best-selling album of the year.

This is a list of the albums ranked number one in the United States during 2023. The top-performing albums and EPs in the U.S. are ranked on the Billboard 200 chart, which is published by Billboard magazine. The data is compiled by Luminate Data based on multi-metric consumption as measured in album-equivalent units, which comprise album sales, track sales, and streams on digital music platforms. Each unit equals one album sold or 10 individual digital tracks sold from an album, or 3,750 ad-supported or 1,250 paid/subscription on-demand official audio and video streams generated by songs from an album.

1989 (Taylor's Version), the fourth re-recorded album by Taylor Swift, surpassed her own Speak Now (Taylor's Version) to garner the largest opening week of 2023, with over 1.65 million album-equivalent units, including 1.35 million album sales. It became the best-selling album of the year, with over 1.9 million copies sold within 2023. Mañana Será Bonito, the fourth studio album by Colombian singer Karol G, became the first-ever Spanish-language album by a female artist to reach the number-one spot, and only the third Spanish-language album to top the chart in its 78-year history.

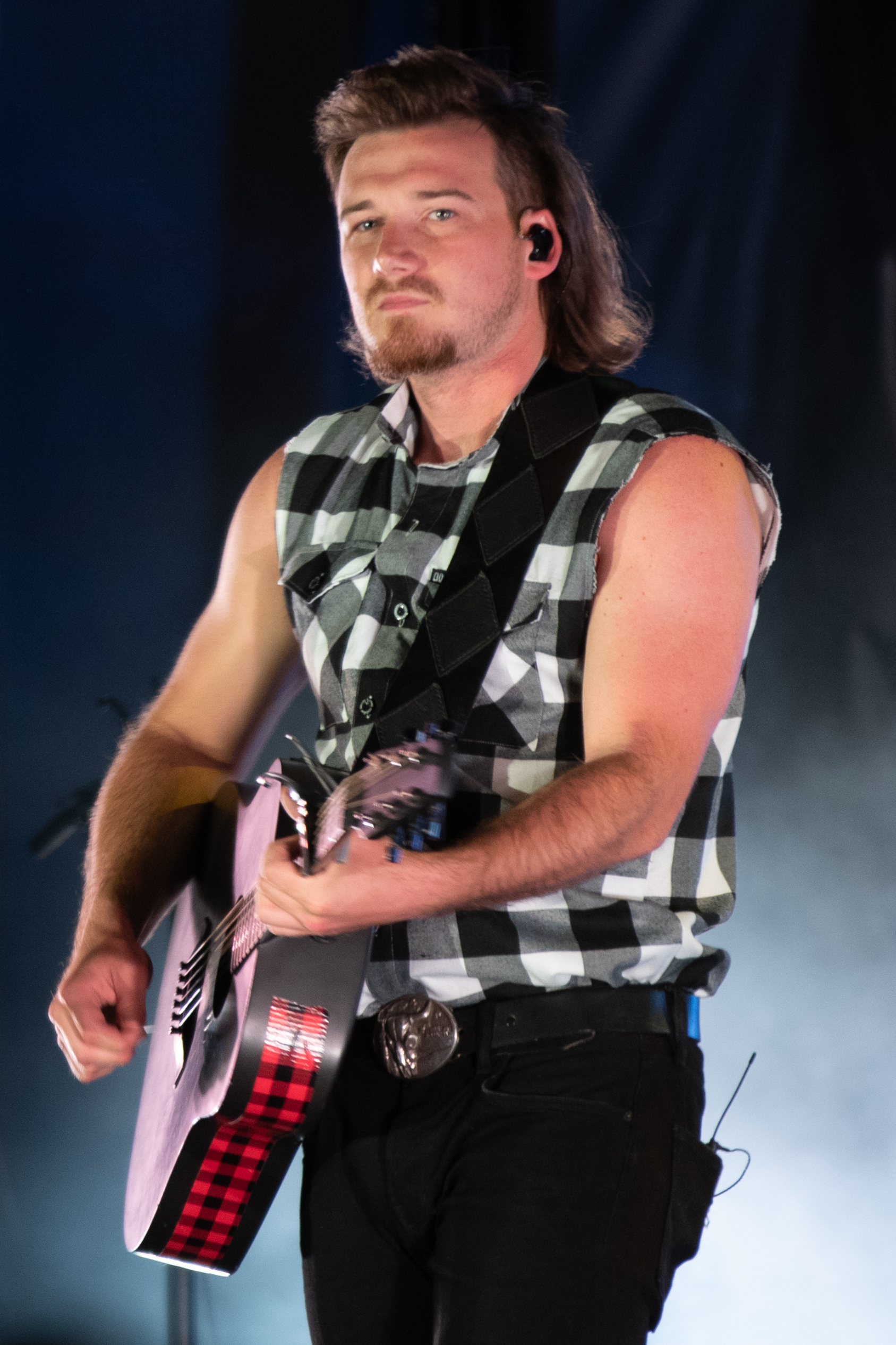
One Thing at a Time by American country singer Morgan Wallen is the longest-running number-one album of the year.

One Thing at a Time, the third studio album by American country singer Morgan Wallen, was the longest-running number-one album of the year, topping the chart for 16 non-consecutive weeks. It also became the most consumed album of 2023. SZA's second studio album, SOS (2022), is 2023's longest reigning number-one on the Billboard 200 by a female artist, topping the chart for eight weeks within the year.

== Chart history ==
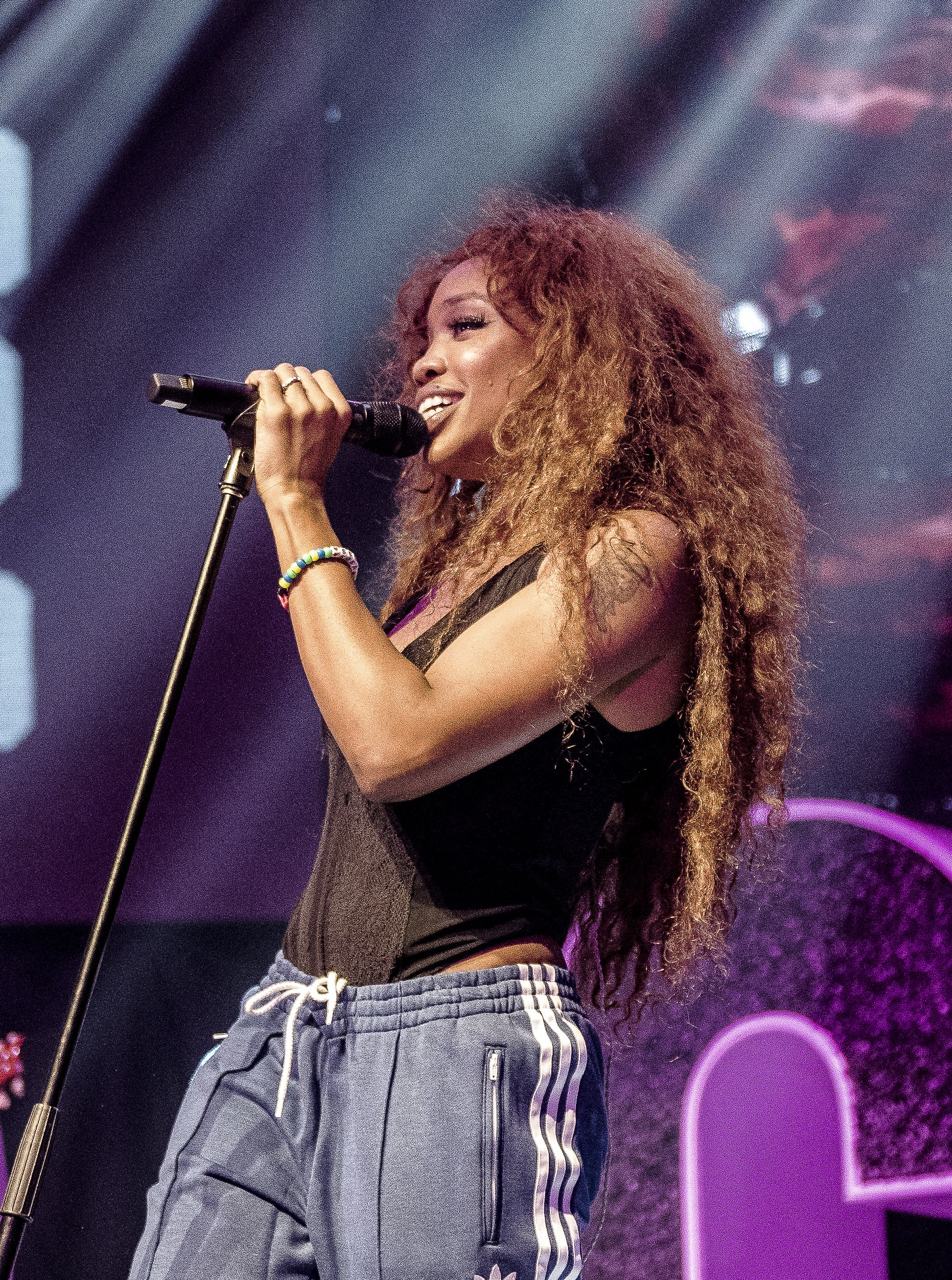
SOS (2022) by SZA is the year's longest-running number-one album by a female artist, with eight weeks atop the chart in 2023.

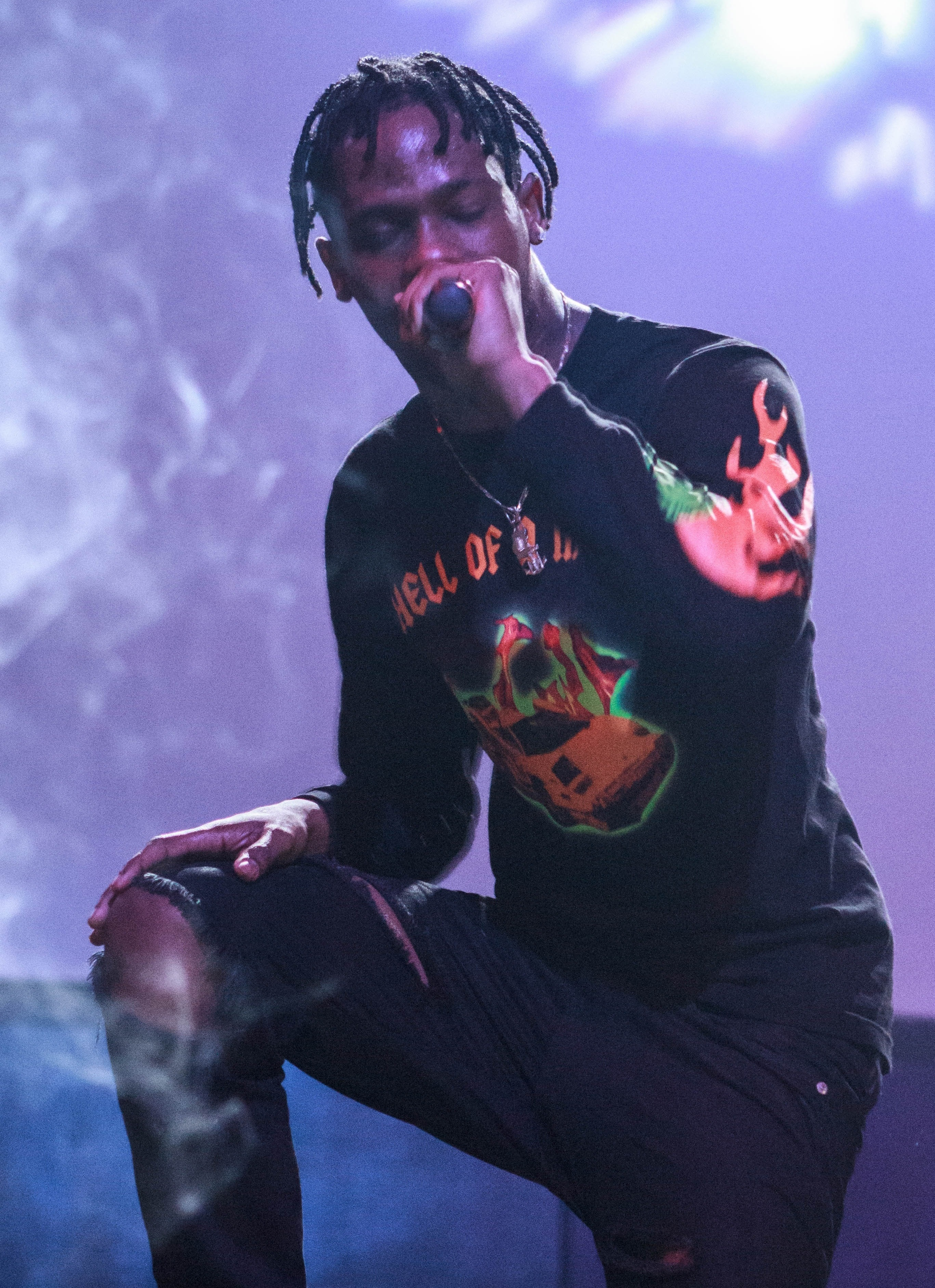
Utopia by Travis Scott became the first rap album since Drake's Scorpion (2018) to spend its first four weeks atop the chart.

Key
†	Indicates the best-performing album of 2023

Issue date	Album	Artist(s)	Units	Ref.
January 7	SOS	SZA	128,000	
January 14	SOS	SZA	125,000	
January 21	SOS	SZA	125,000	
January 28	SOS	SZA	119,000	
February 4	SOS	SZA	111,000	
February 11	The Name Chapter: Temptation	Tomorrow X Together	161,500	
February 18	SOS	SZA	100,000	
February 25	SOS	SZA	93,000	
March 4	SOS	SZA	87,000	
March 11	Mañana Será Bonito	Karol G	94,000	
March 18	One Thing at a Time †	Morgan Wallen	501,000	
March 25	One Thing at a Time †	Morgan Wallen	259,000	
April 1	One Thing at a Time †	Morgan Wallen	209,500	
April 8	One Thing at a Time †	Morgan Wallen	197,000	
April 15	One Thing at a Time †	Morgan Wallen	173,000	
April 22	One Thing at a Time †	Morgan Wallen	167,000	
April 29	One Thing at a Time †	Morgan Wallen	166,000	
May 6	One Thing at a Time †	Morgan Wallen	149,000	
May 13	One Thing at a Time †	Morgan Wallen	138,000	
May 20	One Thing at a Time †	Morgan Wallen	141,000	
May 27	One Thing at a Time †	Morgan Wallen	134,500	
June 3	One Thing at a Time †	Morgan Wallen	129,000	
June 10	Midnights	Taylor Swift	282,000	
June 17	5-Star	Stray Kids	249,500	
June 24	One Thing at a Time †	Morgan Wallen	111,500	
July 1	One Thing at a Time †	Morgan Wallen	110,000	
July 8	One Thing at a Time †	Morgan Wallen	110,500	
July 15	Pink Tape	Lil Uzi Vert	167,000	
July 22	Speak Now (Taylor's Version)	Taylor Swift	716,000	
July 29	Speak Now (Taylor's Version)	Taylor Swift	121,000	
August 5	Get Up	NewJeans	126,500	
August 12	Utopia	Travis Scott	496,000	
August 19	Utopia	Travis Scott	147,000	
August 26	Utopia	Travis Scott	185,000	
September 2	Utopia	Travis Scott	161,000	
September 9	Zach Bryan	Zach Bryan	200,000	
September 16	Zach Bryan	Zach Bryan	115,000	
September 23	Guts	Olivia Rodrigo	302,000	
September 30	Nostalgia	Rod Wave	137,000	
October 7	Nostalgia	Rod Wave	88,000	
October 14	One Thing at a Time †	Morgan Wallen	74,500	
October 21	For All the Dogs	Drake	402,000	
October 28	Nadie Sabe Lo Que Va a Pasar Mañana	Bad Bunny	184,000	
November 4	One More Time...	Blink-182	125,000	
November 11	1989 (Taylor's Version)	Taylor Swift	1,653,000	
November 18	1989 (Taylor's Version)	Taylor Swift	245,000	
November 25	Rock-Star	Stray Kids	224,000	
December 2	For All the Dogs	Drake	145,000	
December 9	1989 (Taylor's Version)	Taylor Swift	141,000	
December 16	The World EP.Fin: Will	Ateez	152,000	
December 23	Pink Friday 2	Nicki Minaj	228,000	
December 30	1989 (Taylor's Version)	Taylor Swift	136,000	

== Number-one artists ==
List of number-one artists by total weeks at number one
Rank	Artist	Weeks at No. 1
1	Morgan Wallen	16
2	SZA	8
3	Taylor Swift	7
4	Travis Scott	4
5	Zach Bryan	2
5	Rod Wave	2
5	Stray Kids	2
5	Drake	2
9	Tomorrow X Together	1
9	Karol G	1
9	Lil Uzi Vert	1
9	NewJeans	1
9	Olivia Rodrigo	1
9	Bad Bunny	1
9	Blink-182	1
9	Ateez	1
9	Nicki Minaj	1

== See also ==
- List of Billboard Hot 100 number ones of 2023
- List of Billboard Global 200 number ones of 2023
- List of Billboard 200 number-one albums of the 2020s
- 2023 in American music
