= List of UK top-ten singles in 2023 =

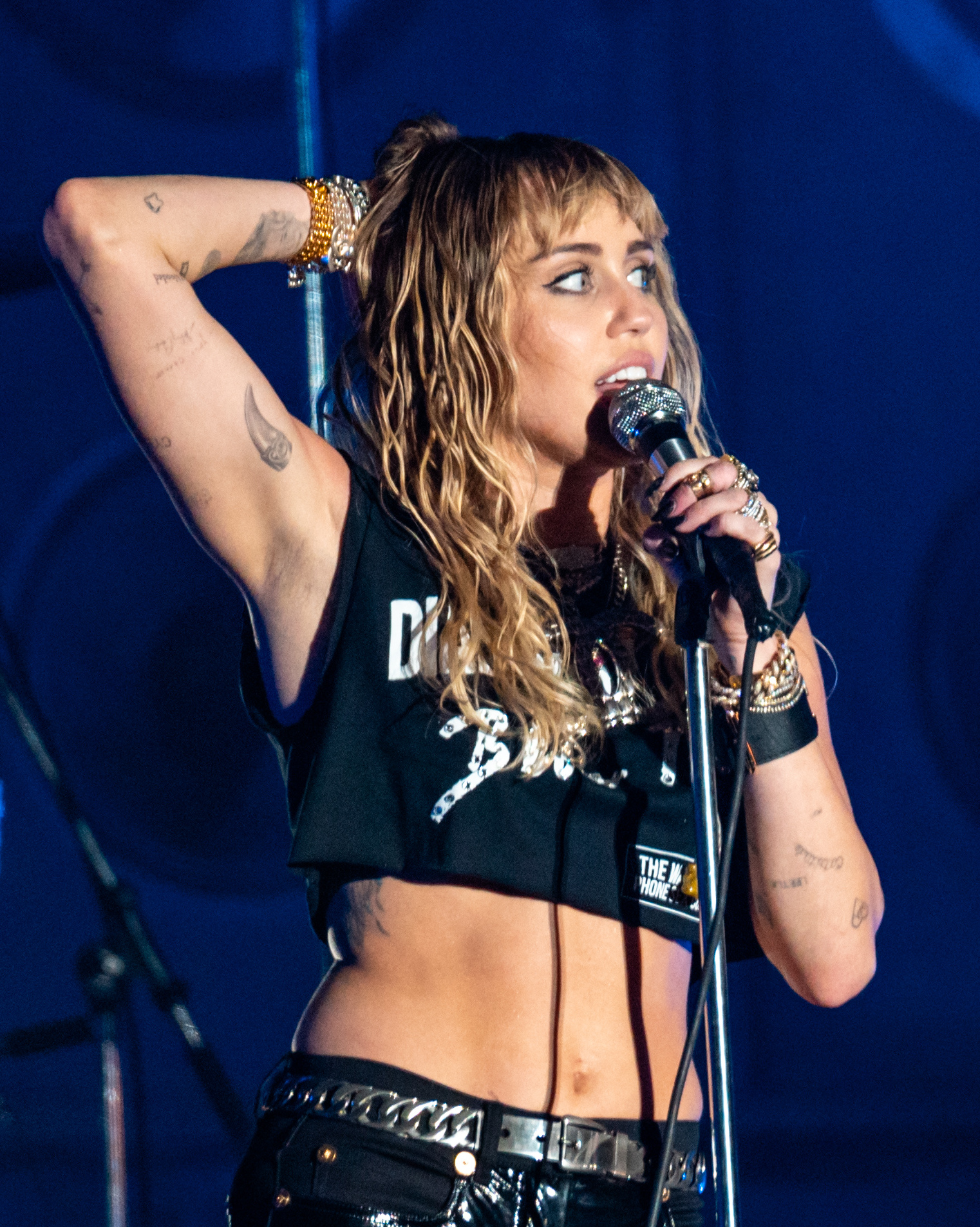
Miley Cyrus secured the best-selling single of 2023 with "Flowers", which topped the chart for ten weeks and became the longest-running chart-topper of the 2020s by a female artist. In its first week of release, the song boasted 92,000 chart units and exceeded 9.9 million streams in the UK alone.

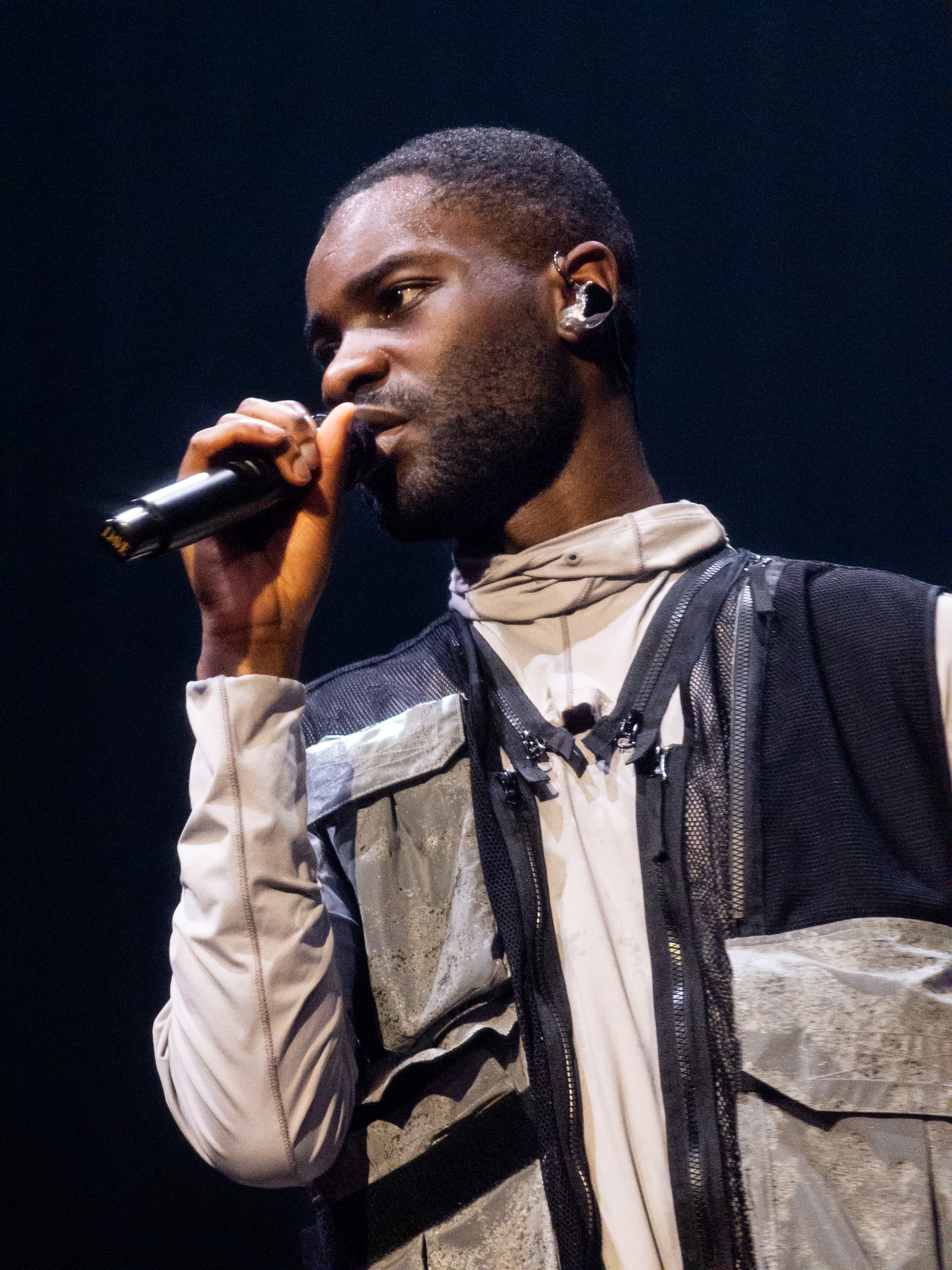
Dave earned his third UK number-one single with "Sprinter", a collaboration with Central Cee, which became the longest-running number-one single by a UK rap artist in chart history, topping the charts for ten consecutive weeks, also becoming the year's second best selling single. The song also had the largest opening week of the year, accumulating 108,200 chart units.

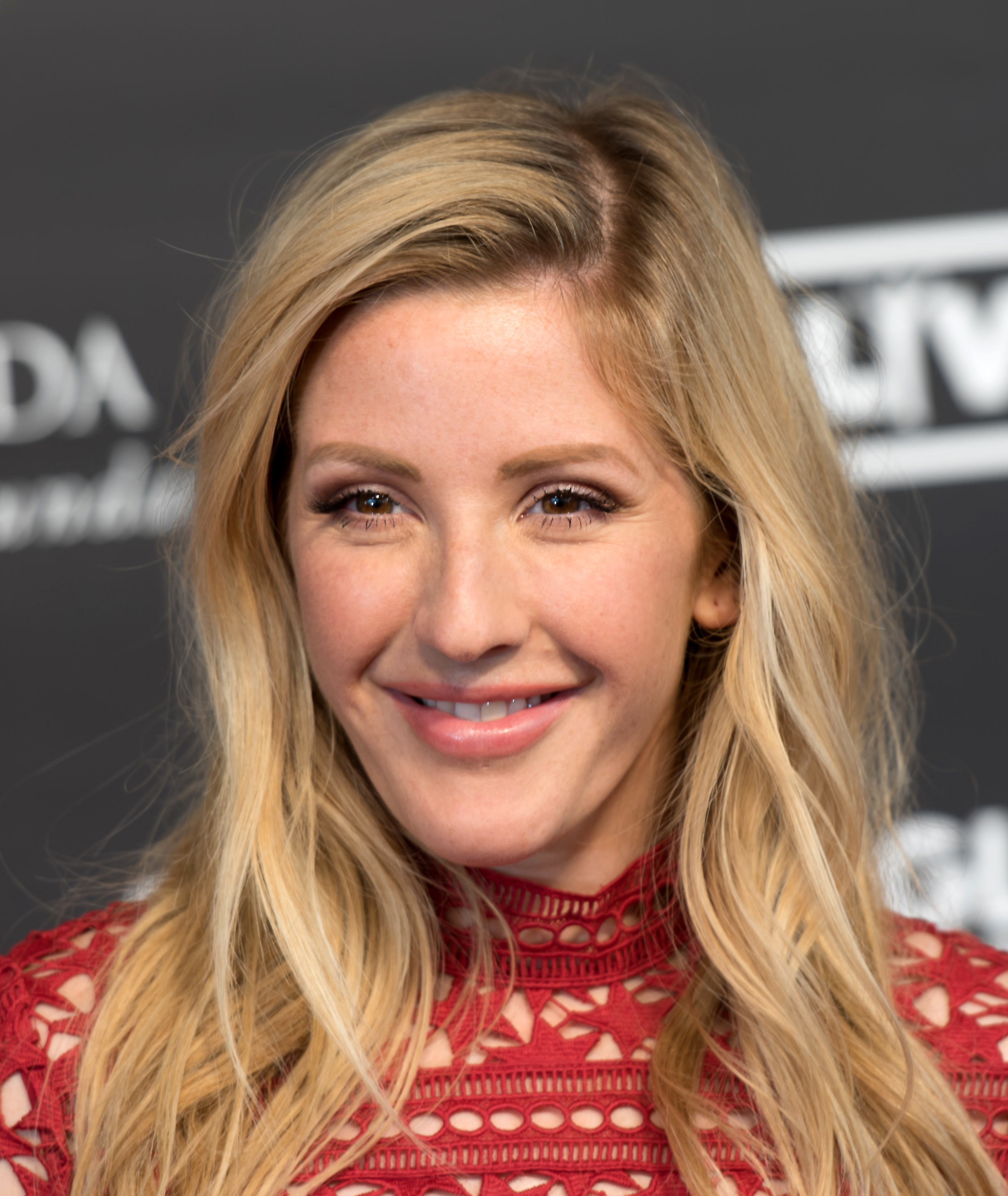
Ellie Goulding earned her fourth UK number-one single in April 2023 with "Miracle", a collaboration with Calvin Harris, which topped the charts for eight non-consecutive weeks, and became the year's fifth best selling single. Goulding also achieved the chart double during the song's second week at number one.

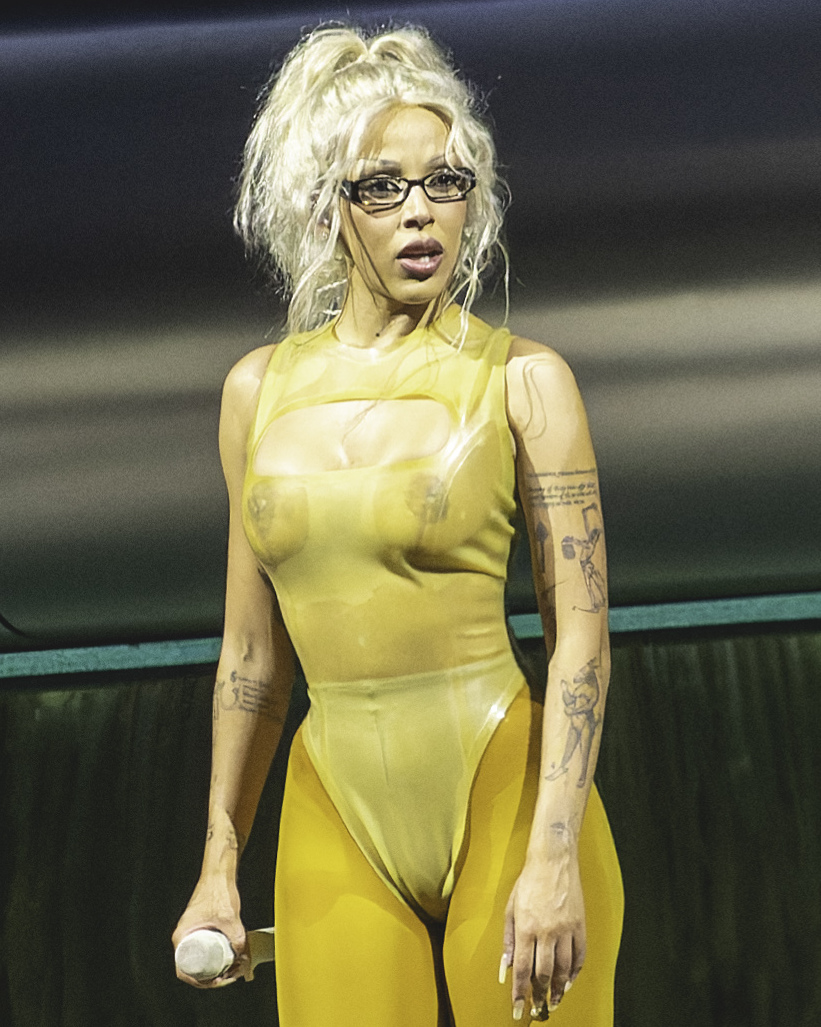
Doja Cat secured her first UK number-one single in September of this year with "Paint the Town Red".

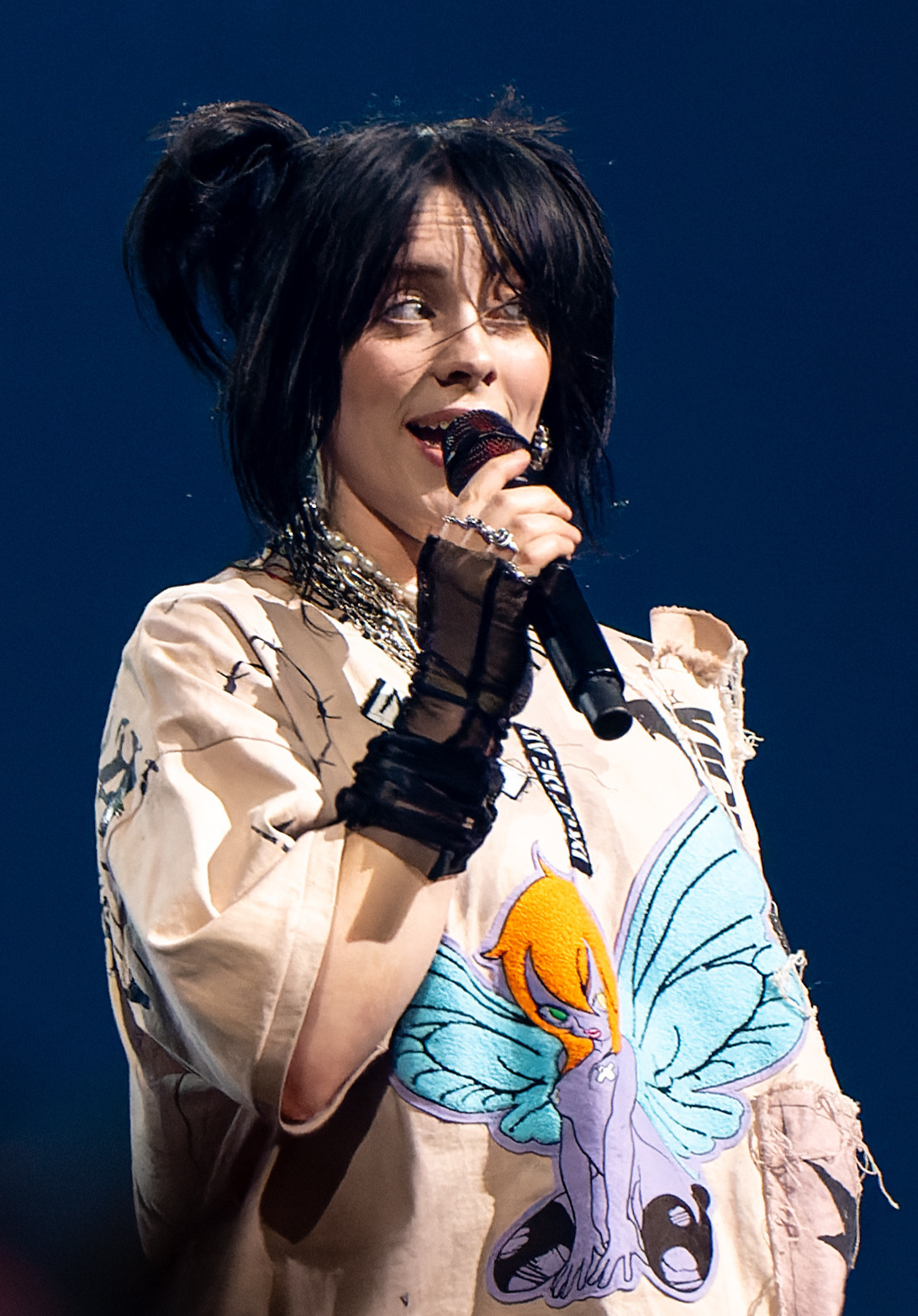
Barbie: The Album made history in 2023 as the first film soundtrack to place four singles in the UK top 10 simultaneously. Two of these reached number-one, including "What Was I Made For?" by Billie Eilish, which went on to win the Academy Award for Best Original Song.

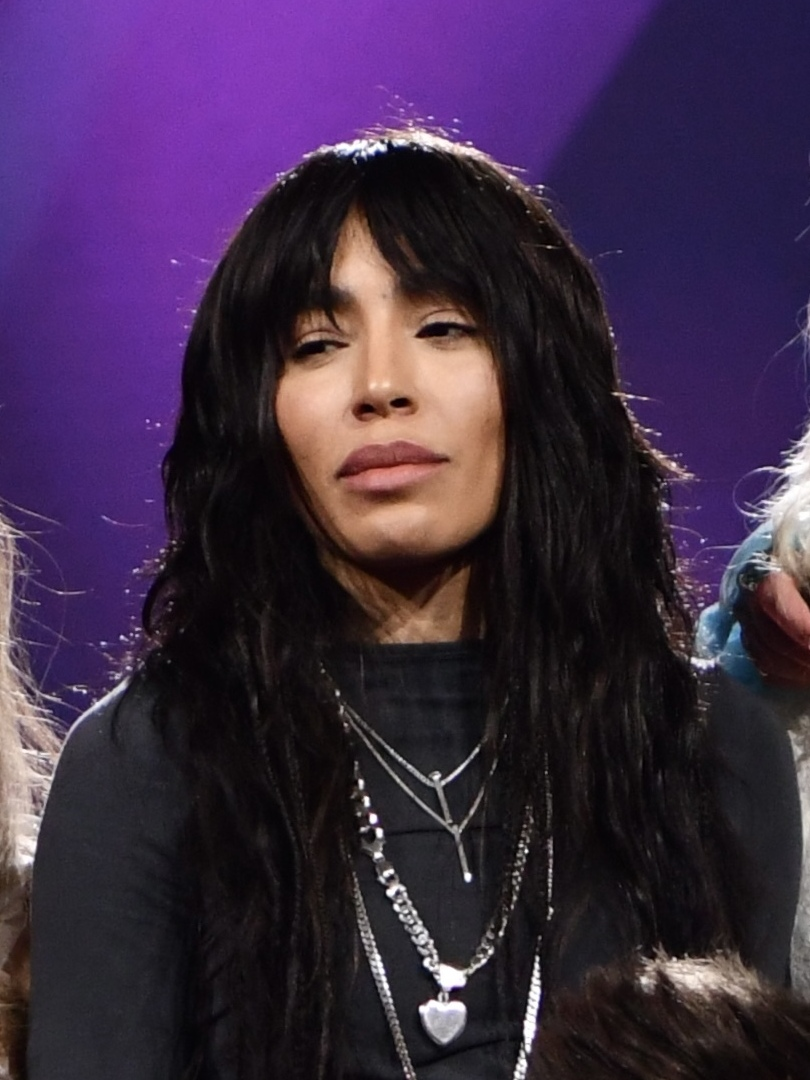
Four entries from the Eurovision Song Contest 2023 entered the UK top 10 simultaneously, including winning song "Tattoo" by Sweden's Loreen, which debuted at number two.

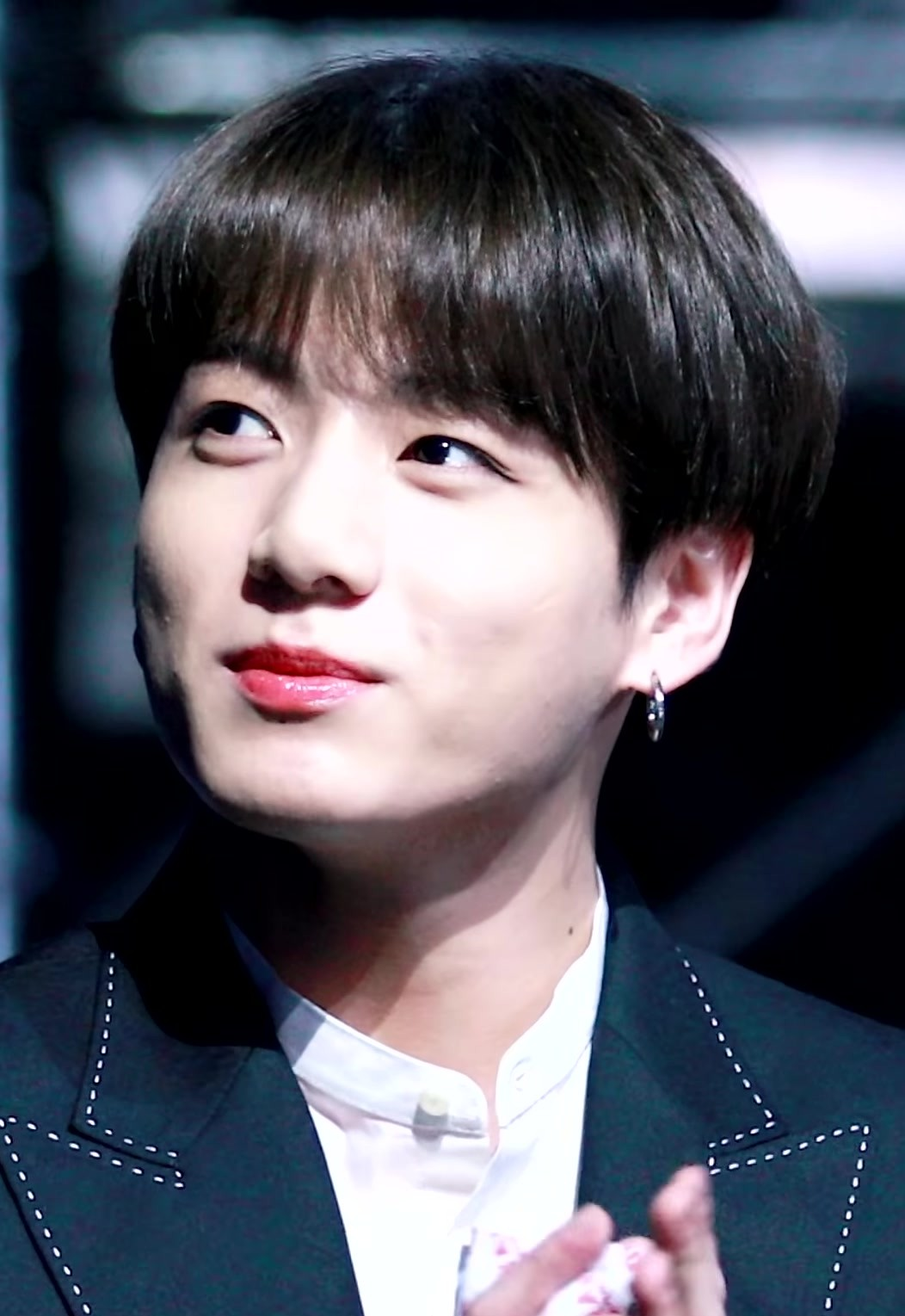
Jung Kook of BTS made history this year by becoming the first South Korean solo artist to secure four solo UK top 10 singles, the highest-charting of which was "Seven", featuring guest vocals from Latto, which debuted at number three in July.

The UK Singles Chart is one of many music charts compiled by the Official Charts Company that calculates the best-selling singles of the week in the United Kingdom. Since 2004 the chart has been based on the sales of both physical singles and digital downloads, with airplay figures excluded from the official chart. Since 2014, the singles chart has been based on both sales and streaming, with the ratio altered in 2017 to 150:1 streams and only three singles by the same artist eligible for the chart. From July 2018, video streams from YouTube Music and Spotify among others began to be counted for the Official Charts. This list shows singles that peaked in the Top 10 of the UK Singles Chart during 2023, as well as singles which peaked in 2022 and 2024 but were in the top 10 in 2023. The entry date is when the song appeared in the top 10 for the first time (week ending, as published by the Official Charts Company, which is six days after the chart is announced).

Ninety-eight singles were in the top 10 this year. Seventeen singles from 2022 remained in the top 10 for several weeks at the beginning of the year, while "Stick Season" by Noah Kahan was released in 2023 but did not reach its peak until 2024. "Calm Down" by Rema, "Escapism" by Raye, "Merry Christmas" by Ed Sheeran and Elton John, "Rockin' Around the Christmas Tree" by Brenda Lee, "It's Beginning to Look a Lot Like Christmas" by Michael Bublé, "Firebabe" by Stormzy, "Fairytale of New York" by The Pogues featuring Kirsty MacColl and "Let Go" by Central Cee were the singles from 2022 to reach their peak in 2023. Bugzy Malone, Miguel, PinkPantheress, Coi Leray, Lizzy McAlpine, Ice Spice, Fred Again, Sonny Fodera and Noah Kahan were among the many artists who achieved their first top 10 single in 2023.

"Last Christmas" by Wham!, originally released in 1984, returned to the top of the chart in the first week of 2023. The first new number-one single of the year was "Escapism" by Raye featuring 070 Shake. Overall, fifteen different songs peaked at number-one in 2023, with Lewis Capaldi (2) having the most songs hit that position.

== Background ==
=== Multiple entries ===
Ninety-eight singles charted in the top 10 in 2023, with eighty-nine singles reaching their peak this year (including the re-entries "Rockin' Around the Christmas Tree", "It's Beginning to Look a Lot Like Christmas" and "Fairytale of New York" which charted in previous years but reached peaks on their latest chart run).

=== Miley Cyrus achieves a streaming career best and second prestigious Chart Double ===
On 20 January 2023 (26 January 2023, week ending), Miley Cyrus debuted at number-one in the UK Singles Chart with "Flowers", which became her third number-one, and her first since "Wrecking Ball" topped the charts in October 2013. "Flowers" boasted 92,000 chart units and exceeded 9.9 million streams, Cyrus' biggest number in its first week. It was also the UK's largest first week activity since "As It Was" by Harry Styles in April 2022. Cyrus went on to achieve the prestigious Chart Double for the second time in her career in March 2023 when during the song's ninth week at number one, the album Endless Summer Vacation debuted at the top of the UK Albums Chart, ten years after this was achieved when Bangerz and "Wrecking Ball" topped both the albums and singles charts, respectively.

=== Sleeper hits gain chart success ===
On 27 January 2023 (2 February 2023, week ending), Miguel entered the top 10 of the UK Singles Chart at number 10 with "Sure Thing", which gave the American singer his first UK top 10 hit. Originally released in 2010, the song saw a resurgence in popularity worldwide in late 2022, due to a viral dance trend on TikTok. It eventually peaked at number 4 on 10 February 2023 (16 February 2023, week ending).

Miguel was not the only artist to win big with a previously unheralded song. The Weeknd's 2016 album track "Die for You", taken from the album Starboy, took off on TikTok after Ariana Grande was added to a remix of the song. This led to the song entering the UK top 10 for the first time at number 4 on 3 March 2023 (9 March 2023, week ending), before rising to number 3 the following week, and staying in that position for two weeks. The song was also a big hit in the United States, topping the Billboard Hot 100 shortly after its ascension in the UK.

Taylor Swift went onto achieve success with a sleeper hit later on in the year. On 7 July 2023 (13 July 2023, week ending), Swift earned her 22nd top-ten single with "Cruel Summer", taken from the album Lover. The song initially peaked at number 27 in September 2019 following the album's release, but saw a resurgence in popularity as Swift embarked on The Eras Tour resulting in the song subsequently becoming a single and entering the UK top 10 for the first time at number 6 and later peaking at number 2.

=== BTS members achieve solo success ===
Two of the seven members of the South Korean collective BTS, Jimin and Jung Kook, secured one and four solo UK top 10 entries, respectively, in 2023, with Jung Kook making history as the first South Korean solo artist to achieve four solo UK top 10 singles.

Jimin secured the first top 10 solo single from any of the band entering at number 8 with "Like Crazy" on 31 March 2023 (6 April 2023, week ending).

On 21 July 2023 (27 July 2023, week ending), Jung Kook entered at number 3 with "Seven", featuring American rapper Latto, which became the highest-charting debut for a solo Korean act in UK chart history. On 6 October 2023 (12 October 2023, week ending), Jung Kook became the first Korean solo artist to secure two UK top 5 singles after his collaboration with Jack Harlow, "3D", debuted at number 5. On 27 October 2023 (2 November 2023, week ending), Jung Kook's collaboration with The Kid Laroi and Central Cee, "Too Much", debuted at number 10, and Jungkook set yet another record by becoming the first Korean solo artist to secure three solo UK top 10 singles. That record was bettered on 10 November 2023 (16 November 2023, week ending), when he secured his fourth consecutive top 10 hit with "Standing Next to You", which debuted at number 6.

Jimin and Jung Kook became the fourth and sixth separate Korean acts to reach the top 10, respectively. They join Psy (with "Gangnam Style" and "Gentleman"), Pinkfong (with the viral hit "Baby Shark"), their own group BTS themselves (who reached the top 10 with "Dynamite", "Butter", "Life Goes On" and "My Universe", alongside Coldplay), and Fifty Fifty who were the fifth (reaching the top 10 with "Cupid").

=== Ellie Goulding achieves the prestigious Chart Double ===
On 14 April 2023 (20 April 2023, week ending) Ellie Goulding achieved the prestigious Chart Double for the first time in her career. During her second week at number one with "Miracle", the album Higher Than Heaven debuted at the top of the UK Albums Chart, tying Goulding with Adele as the British female artist with most number one albums.

=== Fifty Fifty make UK chart history ===
On 5 May 2023 (11 May 2023, week ending) Fifty Fifty became the first K-Pop girl group to enter the top 10 of the UK Singles Chart when "Cupid" rose to number 9 after gaining popularity following a viral trend on TikTok. The song also surpassed the record for the highest-charting song by a K-Pop girl group set by Blackpink with "Sour Candy", a collaboration with Lady Gaga, which peaked at number 17 in June 2020.

=== Eurovision entries enter the top 10 simultaneously ===
On 19 May 2023 (25 May 2023, week ending), four entries from the Eurovision Song Contest 2023 entered the top 10 of the UK Singles Chart simultaneously, the first time in the chart's 71-year history that feat was achieved. These included "Tattoo" (2) by Loreen, the entry for Sweden (which won the contest), "Cha Cha Cha" (6) by Käärijä, the entry for Finland (and also the first Finnish language song to ever enter the top 10 of the UK Singles Chart), "I Wrote a Song" (9) by Mae Muller, the entry for the United Kingdom and "Queen of Kings" (10) by Alessandra, the entry for Norway.

=== Dave & Central Cee score record-breaking number-one ===
On 9 June 2023 (15 June 2023, week ending), Dave and Central Cee's collaboration "Sprinter" debuted at number-one in the UK Singles Chart, giving Dave his third number-one single and Central Cee his first. When "Sprinter" topped the chart, it clinched the biggest opening week of the year so far, accumulating 108,200 chart units, including a record-breaking 13.4 million streams - the biggest week of streams for a rap single ever in UK chart history, surpassing Stormzy's "Vossi Bop", which racked up 12.7m in seven days in May 2019. It also earned the biggest first week of streams since Adele's "Easy On Me" debuted with a record-breaking 24 million streams during its first seven days in October 2021.

Dave and Central Cee set yet another record on 4 August 2023 (10 August 2023, week ending) when "Sprinter" spent a ninth week at number-one, becoming the longest-running British rap number-one single in UK chart history.

=== Kylie Minogue makes a triumphant return and makes chart history ===
On 16 June 2023 (22 June 2023, week ending), Kylie Minogue entered the UK top 10 at number 9 with "Padam Padam", which became her 35th top 10 single, later peaking at number 8. The song was also her first top 10 since "Higher", which peaked at number 8 in February 2011. Minogue also became the fourth woman in UK Chart history to earn a top-ten single in five consecutive decades (1980s, 1990s, 2000s, 2010s and 2020s). The other artists to achieve this feat are Cher, Diana Ross and Lulu in the 1960s, 1970s, 1980s, 1990s and 2000s.

=== Barbie the Album sets records ===
On 28 July 2023 (3 August 2023, week ending), Barbie the Album became the first-ever film soundtrack to land three singles in the top 5 of the UK Singles Chart simultaneously with "What Was I Made For?" by Billie Eilish (3), "Dance the Night" by Dua Lipa (4) and "Barbie World" by Nicki Minaj and Ice Spice with Aqua (5). Ice Spice also landed her first UK top 10 single in the process.

On 4 August 2023 (10 August 2023, week ending), Charli XCX entered the top 10 at number 9 with "Speed Drive", thus making Barbie the Album the first-ever film soundtrack to have four singles in the UK top 10 simultaneously.

=== All-female top six ===
On 18 August 2023 (24 August 2023, week ending), for the first time in the history of the UK Singles Chart, female solo artists solely made up the entire top six of the chart. Billie Eilish claimed her second number-one single with "What Was I Made For?", scoring a last-minute victory over Dua Lipa's "Dance the Night" (2), both songs featuring on Barbie the Album. Joining Eilish and Lipa in the top five were Olivia Rodrigo's "Vampire" (3), Taylor Swift's "Cruel Summer" (4), and Peggy Gou's "(It Goes Like) Nanana" (5), while Rodrigo debuted at number 6 with the highest new entry of the week, "Bad Idea Right?". Additionally, the top eight that week consisted of female-led songs with Nicki Minaj, Ice Spice and Aqua's "Barbie World" at number 7 and Becky Hill and Chase & Status' "Disconnect" at number 8.

=== Kenya Grace becomes only the second British female solo act to top the UK Charts with a self-produced and self-written track ===
On 13 October 2023 (19 October 2023, week ending), Kenya Grace topped the UK Singles Chart with "Strangers" during its fourth week in the top 10. Grace became the first female British solo act to top the UK Singles Chart with an entirely self-written and self-produced track since Kate Bush's "Running Up That Hill" in June 2022. She also became the first British female act to reach number one with her debut solo single since Ella Henderson reached number one with "Ghost" in June 2014.

=== Taylor Swift secures her second Official Chart Double ===
On 3 November 2023 (9 November 2023, week ending), Taylor Swift simultaneously topped both the UK Singles Chart with "Is It Over Now? (Taylor's Version)" and the UK Albums Chart with 1989 (Taylor's Version), securing the prestigious Chart Double for the second time. Swift last achieved this feat in October 2022 when "Anti-Hero" and Midnights simultaneously debuted atop the singles and albums charts, respectively.

=== The Beatles make a record-breaking return to number-one ===
On 10 November 2023 (16 November 2023, week ending), The Beatles returned to the top of the UK Singles Chart with their "final single", "Now and Then". The song, begun as a home demo by John Lennon in 1977 and completed thanks to the use of AI, became their 18th UK number-one single, 60 years after they first topped the chart with "From Me to You" in 1963, making this the longest gap between an artist's first and last number-one in UK chart history. The Beatles also became the act with the longest gap ever between UK number-one singles, as they last reached the top with "The Ballad of John and Yoko" 54 years earlier in 1969, thus overtaking Kate Bush's 44 years between "Wuthering Heights" (1978) and "Running Up That Hill" (2022). The single earned 78,200 chart sales, including 48,600 sales including physical sales and downloads in the first week, making it the fastest selling song of the year.

=== "Last Christmas" finally claims the Christmas number-one spot ===
On 8 December 2023 (14 December 2023, week ending), Wham!'s "Last Christmas" returned to number-one in the UK Singles Chart for a fourth non-consecutive week, after previously topping the chart in both 2020 (for one week) and 2022 (for two non-consecutive weeks), making it the first Christmas single to reach number-one in the UK on four separate occasions. The song retained the top spot for a further three weeks, and on 22 December 2023 (28 December 2023, week ending), it finally claimed the coveted Christmas number-one spot, 39 years after its initial release, and seven years after the death of the song's writer and Wham!'s lead singer George Michael.

=== Chart debuts ===
Thirty-seven achieved their first charting top ten single in 2023, either as a lead or featured artist.

The following table (collapsed on desktop site) does not include acts who had previously charted as part of a group and secured their first top ten solo single.

Artist	Number of top 10s	First entry	Chart position	Other entries
Bobby Helms (Posthumous)	1	"Jingle Bell Rock"	7	—
Bugzy Malone	1	"Out of Nowhere"	9	—
TeeDee	1	"Out of Nowhere"	9	—
Metro Boomin	1	"Creepin'"	7	—
Miguel	1	"Sure Thing"	4	—
PinkPantheress	1	"Boy's a Liar"	2	—
Coi Leray	1	"Players"	7	—
Lizzy McAlpine	1	"Ceilings"	6	—
Libianca	1	"People"	2	—
Strandz	1	"Us Against the World"	9	—
David Kushner	1	"Daylight"	2	—
Switch Disco	1	"React"	4	—
Fifty Fifty	1	"Cupid"	8	—
Nines	1	"Tony Soprano 2"	10	—
Käärijä	1	"Cha Cha Cha"	6	—
Mae Muller	1	"I Wrote a Song"	9	—
Alessandra	1	"Queen of Kings"	10	—
Charlotte Plank	1	"Dancing is Healing"	5	—
Vibe Chemistry	1	"Dancing is Healing"	5	—
Hannah Laing	1	"Good Love"	7	—
RoRo	1	"Good Love"	7	—
Peggy Gou	1	"(It Goes Like) Nanana"	5	—
Latto	1	"Seven"	3	—
Ice Spice	1	"Barbie World"	4	—
Cassö	1	"Prada"	2	—
Bou	1	"Baddadan"	9	—
Irah	1	"Baddadan"	9	—
Trigga	1	"Baddadan"	9	—
Takura	1	"Baddadan"	9	—
Fred Again	1	"Adore U"	4	—
Kenya Grace	1	"Strangers"	1	—
Tyla	1	"Water"	4	—
Yeat	1	"IDGAF"	5	—
Sonny Fodera	1	"Asking"	7	—
Clementine Douglas	1	"Asking"	7	—
Mitski	1	"My Love Mine All Mine"	8	—
Noah Kahan	1	"Stick Season"	1	—

Notes

Despite being considered a Christmas Standard, "Jingle Bell Rock" entered the top-ten for the first time in January 2023 becoming Helms' first top-ten single.

Jimin earned his first UK top ten debut in April 2023 with "Like Crazy", and Jung Kook earned his first UK top ten debut in July 2023 with "Seven". These also became their first solo top ten following the hiatus of BTS, respectively.

=== Songs from films ===
Original songs from films charted in the top-ten throughout the year. These included "What Was I Made For?", "Dance the Night", "Barbie World" and "Speed Drive" (from Barbie).

=== Best-selling singles ===
Miley Cyrus had the best-selling single of the year with "Flowers". The song spent ten weeks at number-one, sold 1,800,000 copies and was certified 3× platinum by the BPI. "Sprinter" by Dave and Central Cee came in second place, while Raye featuring 070 Shake's "Escapism", Taylor Swift's "Anti-Hero" and Calvin Harris and Ellie Goulding's "Miracle" made up the top five. Songs by Rema, SZA, PinkPantheress, Harry Styles and Libianca were also in the top ten best-selling singles of the year.

== Top-ten singles ==
Key

Symbol	Meaning
‡	Single peaked in 2022 but still in chart in 2023.
♦	Single released in 2023 but peaked in 2024.
(#)	Year-end top-ten single position and rank
Entered	The date that the single first appeared in the chart.
Peak	Highest position that the single reached in the UK Singles Chart.

Entered (week ending)	Weeks in top 10	Single	Artist	Peak	Peak reached (week ending)	Weeks at peak
Singles in 2022
14 April 2022	37	"As It Was" ‡ (#9) ^{[T]}^{[CC]}	Harry Styles	1	14 April 2022	10
16 June 2022	14	"Green Green Grass" ‡ ^{[AA]}	George Ezra	3	21 July 2022	4
22 September 2022	12	"Forget Me" ‡ ^{[Z]}	Lewis Capaldi	1	22 September 2022	1
27 October 2022	11	"Miss You" ‡ ^{[O]}^{[R]}	Robin Schulz & Oliver Tree	3	24 November 2022	1
3 November 2022	15	"Anti-Hero" ‡ (#4) ^{[K]}	Taylor Swift	1	3 November 2022	6
17 November 2022	8	"Made You Look" ‡ ^{[M]}	Meghan Trainor	2	8 December 2022	1
17 November 2022	13	"Messy in Heaven" ‡ ^{[L]}	Venbee & Goddard.	3	8 December 2022	2
24 November 2022	27	"Calm Down" (#6) ^{[P]}	Rema	3	8 June 2023	1
8 December 2022	12	"Escapism" (#3) ^{[J]}	Raye featuring 070 Shake	1	12 January 2023	1
8 December 2022	10	"All I Want for Christmas Is You" ‡ ^{[A]}^{[RR]}	Mariah Carey	1	15 December 2022	1
8 December 2022	10	"Last Christmas" ‡ ^{[B]}^{[QQ]}	Wham!	1	22 December 2022	6
15 December 2022	8	"Merry Christmas" ^{[C]}^{[UU]}	Ed Sheeran & Elton John	3	5 January 2023	1
15 December 2022	8	"Rockin' Around the Christmas Tree" ^{[D]}^{[TT]}	Brenda Lee	4	5 January 2023	1
15 December 2022	7	"It's Beginning to Look a Lot Like Christmas" ^{[E]}^{[G]}^{[XX]}	Michael Bublé	6	5 January 2023	1
15 December 2022	4	"Firebabe"	Stormzy	5	5 January 2023	1
22 December 2022	6	"Fairytale of New York" ^{[F]}^{[H]}^{[SS]}	The Pogues featuring Kirsty MacColl	4	14 December 2023	1
29 December 2022	6	"Let Go" ^{[N]}	Central Cee	6	12 January 2023	3
Singles in 2023
5 January 2023	2	"Jingle Bell Rock" ^{[WW]}	Bobby Helms	7	5 January 2023	1
5 January 2023	1	"Someday at Christmas"	Lizzo	8	5 January 2023	1
5 January 2023	1	"It's the Most Wonderful Time of the Year" ^{[I]}	Andy Williams	10	5 January 2023	1
12 January 2023	10	"Kill Bill" (#7)	SZA	3	19 January 2023	7
12 January 2023	2	"Out of Nowhere"	Bugzy Malone & TeeDee	9	12 January 2023	1
12 January 2023	1	"Another Love" ^{[Q]}	Tom Odell	10	12 January 2023	1
19 January 2023	1	"Pointless"	Lewis Capaldi	1	19 January 2023	1
26 January 2023	15	"Flowers" (#1)	Miley Cyrus	1	26 January 2023	10
26 January 2023	8	"Creepin'" ^{[W]}^{[X]}	Metro Boomin, The Weeknd & 21 Savage	7	26 January 2023	1
2 February 2023	1	"Martin's Sofa"	Headie One	9	2 February 2023	1
2 February 2023	7	"Sure Thing"	Miguel	4	16 February 2023	2
16 February 2023	9	"Boy's a Liar" (#8) ^{[S]}	PinkPantheress	2	2 March 2023	4
16 February 2023	3	"10:35" ^{[U]}	Tiësto featuring Tate McRae	8	2 March 2023	1
2 March 2023	4	"Players"	Coi Leray	7	2 March 2023	1
2 March 2023	7	"Ceilings"	Lizzy McAlpine	6	23 March 2023	2
9 March 2023	5	"Die for You" ^{[V]}	The Weeknd	3	16 March 2023	2
16 March 2023	10	"People" (#10)	Libianca	2	20 April 2023	1
23 March 2023	17	"Miracle" (#5)	Calvin Harris & Ellie Goulding	1	13 April 2023	8
23 March 2023	3	"Us Against the World" ^{[Y]}	Strandz	9	30 March 2023	1
6 April 2023	10	"Eyes Closed"	Ed Sheeran	1	6 April 2023	1
6 April 2023	1	"Like Crazy"	Jimin	8	6 April 2023	1
20 April 2023	2	"Search & Rescue"	Drake	5	20 April 2023	1
27 April 2023	8	"Wish You the Best"	Lewis Capaldi	1	27 April 2023	1
27 April 2023	9	"Daylight"	David Kushner	2	4 May 2023	5
4 May 2023	10	"React"	Switch Disco & Ella Henderson	4	15 June 2023	1
11 May 2023	3	"Cupid" ^{[DD]}	Fifty Fifty	8	18 May 2023	1
11 May 2023	1	"Tony Soprano 2" ^{[BB]}	Nines	10	11 May 2023	1
18 May 2023	1	"Scrap the Monarchy"	The Krown Jewelz	9	18 May 2023	1
25 May 2023	4	"Tattoo"	Loreen	2	25 May 2023	1
25 May 2023	1	"Cha Cha Cha"	Käärijä	6	25 May 2023	1
25 May 2023	1	"I Wrote a Song"	Mae Muller	9	25 May 2023	1
25 May 2023	1	"Queen of Kings"	Alessandra	10	25 May 2023	1
1 June 2023	7	"Giving Me"	Jazzy	3	15 June 2023	1
1 June 2023	1	"Say Yes to Heaven"	Lana Del Rey	9	1 June 2023	1
15 June 2023	11	"Sprinter" (#2)	Dave & Central Cee	1	15 June 2023	10
15 June 2023	5	"Dancing Is Healing"	Rudimental featuring Charlotte Plank & Vibe Chemistry	5	6 July 2023	1
22 June 2023	7	"Who Told You"	J Hus featuring Drake	2	22 June 2023	3
22 June 2023	4	"Padam Padam" ^{[EE]}	Kylie Minogue	8	29 June 2023	1
29 June 2023	5	"Good Love"	Hannah Laing featuring RoRo	7	6 July 2023	2
6 July 2023	12	"(It Goes Like) Nanana"	Peggy Gou	5	20 July 2023	4
13 July 2023	14	"Vampire"	Olivia Rodrigo	1	7 September 2023	1
13 July 2023	29	"Cruel Summer" ^{[NN]}^{[OO]}^{[DDD]}	Taylor Swift	2	14 September 2023	1
13 July 2023	2	"Pakistan"	D-Block Europe & Clavish	8	20 July 2023	1
20 July 2023	1	"I Can See You (Taylor's Version)"	Taylor Swift	6	20 July 2023	1
20 July 2023	4	"0800 Heaven" ^{[FF]}	Nathan Dawe, Joel Corry & Ella Henderson	9	20 July 2023	2
27 July 2023	1	"Seven"	Jung Kook featuring Latto	3	27 July 2023	1
27 July 2023	6	"FukUMean" ^{[GG]}	Gunna	7	27 July 2023	1
27 July 2023	8	"What Was I Made For?"	Billie Eilish	1	24 August 2023	1
3 August 2023	5	"Dance the Night"	Dua Lipa	1	31 August 2023	1
3 August 2023	5	"Barbie World"	Nicki Minaj & Ice Spice with Aqua	4	10 August 2023	1
10 August 2023	1	"Speed Drive"	Charli XCX	9	10 August 2023	1
10 August 2023	1	"Meltdown"	Travis Scott featuring Drake	10	10 August 2023	1
17 August 2023	10	"Disconnect" ^{[JJ]}	Becky Hill & Chase & Status	6	7 September 2023	2
24 August 2023	4	"Bad Idea Right?" ^{[HH]}	Olivia Rodrigo	3	21 September 2023	1
24 August 2023	5	"Desire"	Calvin Harris & Sam Smith	6	14 September 2023	1
31 August 2023	8	"Paint the Town Red" ^{[MM]}	Doja Cat	1	14 September 2023	5
7 September 2023	22	"Prada" ^{[BBB]}	Cassö, Raye & D-Block Europe	2	19 October 2023	5
7 September 2023	10	"Baddadan" ^{[KK]}^{[LL]}	Chase & Status & Bou featuring Irah, Flowdan, Trigga & Takura	5	26 October 2023	1
14 September 2023	6	"Adore U"	Fred Again	4	21 September 2023	1
21 September 2023	2	"Get Him Back!"	Olivia Rodrigo	7	21 September 2023	1
28 September 2023	7	"Strangers"	Kenya Grace	1	19 October 2023	3
28 September 2023	20	"Greedy" ^{[YY]}^{[CCC]}	Tate McRae	3	12 October 2023	4
28 September 2023	1	"Slime You Out"	Drake featuring SZA	10	28 September 2023	1
12 October 2023	1	"3D"	Jung Kook featuring Jack Harlow	5	12 October 2023	1
12 October 2023	12	"Water" ^{[FFF]}	Tyla	4	26 October 2023	1
19 October 2023	1	"First Person Shooter"	Drake featuring J. Cole	4	19 October 2023	1
19 October 2023	2	"IDGAF"	Drake featuring Yeat	5	19 October 2023	1
19 October 2023	1	"Virginia Beach"	Drake	6	19 October 2023	1
19 October 2023	4	"Asking"	Sonny Fodera & MK featuring Clementine Douglas	7	26 October 2023	2
26 October 2023	3	"My Love Mine All Mine" ^{[PP]}	Mitski	8	26 October 2023	2
2 November 2023	24	"Stick Season" ♦ ^{[GGG]}	Noah Kahan	1	11 January 2024	7
2 November 2023	1	"Too Much"	The Kid Laroi, Jung Kook & Central Cee	10	2 November 2023	1
9 November 2023	5	"Is It Over Now? (Taylor's Version)"	Taylor Swift	1	9 November 2023	1
9 November 2023	2	"Now That We Don't Talk (Taylor's Version)"	Taylor Swift	2	9 November 2023	1
9 November 2023	1	"'Slut!' (Taylor's Version)"	Taylor Swift	5	9 November 2023	1
16 November 2023	2	"Now and Then"	The Beatles	1	16 November 2023	1
16 November 2023	1	"Standing Next to You"	Jung Kook	6	16 November 2023	1
23 November 2023	12	"Lovin on Me" ^{[AAA]}	Jack Harlow	1	23 November 2023	3
23 November 2023	7	"Houdini" ^{[EEE]}	Dua Lipa	2	23 November 2023	1
14 December 2023	2	"Merry Christmas Everyone" ^{[XX]}^{[ZZ]}	Shakin' Stevens	10	14 December 2023	2
21 December 2023	3	"You're Christmas to Me"	Sam Ryder	2	28 December 2023	2

== Entries by artist ==
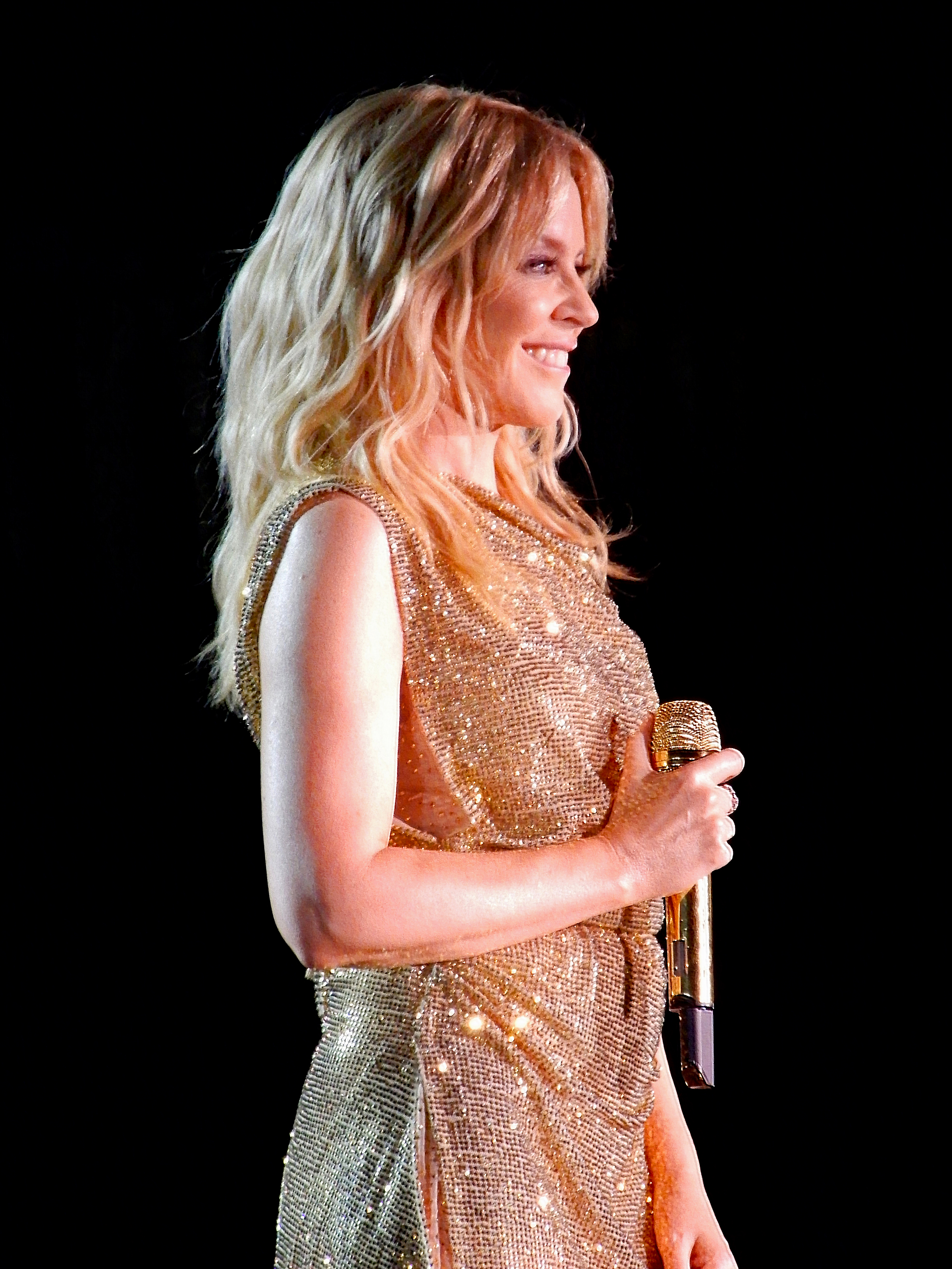
Kylie Minogue became only the fourth female artist in chart history to earn a UK top 10 single in five consecutive decades, with "Padam Padam" which peaked at number eight in June 2023, and became her first top 10 hit since 2011.

The following table shows artists who achieved two or more top 10 entries in 2023, including singles that reached their peak in 2022. The figures include both main artists and featured artists, while appearances on ensemble charity records are also counted for each artist. The total number of weeks an artist spent in the top ten in 2023 is also shown.

Entries	Artist	Weeks	Singles
7	Drake	13	"Search & Rescue", "Who Told You", "Meltdown", "Slime You Out", "First Person Shooter", "IDGAF", "Virginia Beach"
6	Taylor Swift	26	"Anti-Hero", "Cruel Summer", "I Can See You (Taylor's Version)", "Is It Over Now? (Taylor's Version)", "Now That We Don't Talk (Taylor's Version)", "'Slut!' (Taylor's Version)"
4	Jung Kook	4	"Seven", "3D", "Too Much", "Standing Next to You"
3	Central Cee	17	"Let Go", "Sprinter", "Too Much"
3	Olivia Rodrigo	14	"Vampire", "Bad Idea Right?", "Get Him Back!"
3	Lewis Capaldi	9	"Forget Me", "Pointless", "Wish You the Best"
2	Calvin Harris	22	"Miracle", "Desire"
2	Raye	22	"Escapism", "Prada"
2	Ella Henderson	14	"React", "0800 Heaven"
2	The Weeknd	12	"Creepin'", "Die for You"
2	Ed Sheeran	14	"Merry Christmas", "Eyes Closed"
2	SZA ^{[II]}	11	"Kill Bill", "Slime You Out"
2	Chase & Status	15	"Disconnect", "Badaddan"
2	D-Block Europe	16	"Pakistan", "Prada"
2	Tate McRae	15	"10:35", "Greedy"
2	Dua Lipa	8	"Dance the Night", "Houdini"
2	Jack Harlow	7	"3D", "Lovin on Me"

== Notes ==
- ^{a} "All I Want for Christmas Is You" re-entered the top 10 at number 8 on 8 December 2022 (week ending). The song originally peaked at number 2 upon its initial release in 1994 and reached number-one for the first time ever on 17 December 2020 (week ending).
- ^{b} "Last Christmas" re-entered the top 10 at number 9 on 8 December 2022 (week ending). The song originally peaked at number 2 upon its initial release in 1984 and reached number-one for the first time ever on 7 January 2021 (week ending).
- ^{c} "Merry Christmas" re-entered the top 10 at number 4 on 15 December 2022 (week ending), having originally peaked at number-one upon release in 2021.
- ^{d} "Rockin' Around the Christmas Tree" re-entered the top 10 at number 6 on 15 December 2022 (week ending). Having originally peaked at number 6 upon its original release in 1962, the song reached a new peak of number 4 on 5 January 2023 (week ending).
- ^{e} "It's Beginning to Look a Lot Like Christmas" re-entered the top 10 at number 10 on 15 December 2022 (week ending). Having first peaked inside the top 10 at number 7 in 2018, the song reached a new peak of number 6 on 5 January 2023 (week ending).
- ^{f} "Fairytale of New York" re-entered the top 10 at number 9 on 22 December 2022 (week ending), having originally peaked at number 2 upon release in 1987.
- ^{g} "It's Beginning to Look A lot Like Christmas" re-entered the top 10 at number 6 on 5 January 2023 (week ending).
- ^{h} "Fairytale of New York" re-entered the top 10 at number 9 on 5 January 2023 (week ending).
- ^{i} "It's the Most Wonderful Time of the Year" first charted at number 21 in 2007, and reached the top 10 for the first time on 6 January 2022 (week ending), peaking at number 9.
- ^{j} "Escapism" re-entered the top 10 at number-one on 12 January 2023 (week ending).
- ^{k} "Anti-Hero" re-entered the top 10 at number 2 on 12 January 2023 (week ending).
- ^{l} "Messy in Heaven" re-entered the top 10 at number 3 on 12 January 2023 (week ending).
- ^{m} "Made You Look" re-entered the top 10 at number 5 on 12 January 2023 (week ending).
- ^{n} "Let Go" re-entered the top 10 at number 6 on 12 January 2023 (week ending).
- ^{o} "Miss You" re-entered the top 10 at number 7 on 12 January 2023 (week ending).
- ^{p} "Calm Down" re-entered the top 10 at number 8 on 12 January 2023 (week ending).
- ^{q} "Another Love" re-entered the top 10 at number 10 on 12 January 2023 (week ending), having originally peaked at number 10 upon release in 2013.
- ^{r} "Miss You" re-entered the top 10 at number 10 on 9 February 2023 (week ending).
- ^{s} "Boy's a Liar" entered the top 10 at number 8 on 16 February 2023 (week ending), following the release of the subsequent Boy's a Liar Pt. 2 remix featuring Ice Spice.
- ^{t} "As It Was" re-entered the top 10 at number 7 on 23 February 2023 (week ending), following Styles' success and performance of the song at the Brit Awards 2023.
- ^{u} "10:35" re-entered the top 10 at number 8 on 2 March 2023 (week ending).
- ^{v} "Die for You" entered the top 10 at number 4 on 9 March 2023 (week ending), following the release of the subsequent remix featuring Ariana Grande, and the song's resurgence in popularity on social media app TikTok.
- ^{w} "Creepin'" re-entered the top 10 at number 10 on 30 March 2023 (week ending), following the release of the remix featuring Diddy.
- ^{x} "Creepin'" re-entered the top 10 at number 8 on 13 April 2023 (week ending).
- ^{y} "Us Against the World" re-entered the top 10 at number 10 on 13 April 2023 (week ending).
- ^{z} "Forget Me" re-entered the top 10 at number 8 on 20 April 2023 (week ending), following the release of Capaldi's Netflix documentary Lewis Capaldi: How I'm Feeling Now.
- ^{aa} "Green Green Grass" re-entered the top 10 at number 9 on 20 April 2023 (week ending).
- ^{bb} "Tony Soprano 2" entered the top 10 at number 10 on 11 May 2023 (week ending), following the release of the album Crop Circle 2.
- ^{cc} "As It Was" re-entered the top 10 at number 10 on 1 June 2023 (week ending) after Styles embarked on his final leg of UK shows for his tour, Love On Tour.
- ^{dd} "Cupid" re-entered the top 10 at number 9 on 8 June 2023 (week ending).
- ^{ee} "Padam Padam" re-entered the top 10 at number 10 on 20 July 2023 (week ending).
- ^{ff} "0800 Heaven" re-entered the top 10 at number 10 on 17 August 2023 (week ending).
- ^{gg} "FukUMean" re-entered the top 10 at number 10 on 31 August 2023 (week ending).
- ^{hh} "Bad Idea Right?" re-entered the top 10 at number 3 on 21 September 2023 (week ending) following the release of the album Guts.
- ^{ii} Figure includes a feature on "Slime You Out".
- ^{jj} "Disconnect" re-entered the top 10 at number 8 on 5 October 2023 (week ending).
- ^{kk} "Baddadan" re-entered the top 10 at number 10 on 5 October 2023 (week ending).
- ^{ll} "Baddadan" re-entered the top 10 at number 5 on 26 October 2023 (week ending).
- ^{mm} "Paint the Town Red" re-entered the top 10 at number 9 on 26 October 2023 (week ending).
- ^{nn} "Cruel Summer" re-entered the top 10 at number 3 on 2 November 2023 (week ending) following the release of a live version to tie in with the cinematic release of the film Taylor Swift: The Eras Tour.
- ^{oo} "Cruel Summer" re-entered the top 10 at number 7 on 16 November 2023 (week ending).
- ^{pp} "My Love Mine All Mine" re-entered the top 10 at number 10 on 30 November 2023 (week ending).
- ^{qq} "Last Christmas" re-entered the top 10 at number 5 on 7 December 2023 (week ending).
- ^{rr} "All I Want for Christmas Is You" re-entered the top 10 at number 6 on 7 December 2023 (week ending).
- ^{ss} "Fairytale of New York" re-entered the top 10 at number 4 on 14 December 2023 (week ending), following the death of The Pogues' lead singer Shane MacGowan.
- ^{tt} "Rockin' Around the Christmas Tree" re-entered the top 10 at number 6 on 14 December 2023 (week ending).
- ^{uu} "Merry Christmas" re-entered the top 10 at number 7 on 14 December 2023 (week ending).
- ^{vv} "It's Beginning to Look a Lot Like Christmas" re-entered the top 10 at number 8 on 14 December 2023 (week ending).
- ^{ww} "Jingle Bell Rock" re-entered the top 10 at number 9 on 14 December 2023 (week ending).
- ^{xx} "Merry Christmas Everyone" re-entered the top 10 at number 10 on 14 December 2023 (week ending), having originally peaked at number-one upon its original release in 1985.
- ^{yy} "Greedy" re-entered the top 10 at number 9 on 21 December 2023 (week ending), following the release of the album Think Later.
- ^{zz} "Merry Christmas Everyone" re-entered the top 10 at number 10 on 28 December 2023 (week ending).
- ^{aaa} "Lovin on Me" re-entered the top 10 at number 2 on 11 January 2024 (week ending).
- ^{bbb} "Prada" re-entered the top 10 at number 3 on 11 January 2024 (week ending).
- ^{ccc} "Greedy" re-entered the top 10 at number 4 on 11 January 2024 (week ending).
- ^{ddd} "Cruel Summer" re-entered the top 10 at number 5 on 11 January 2024 (week ending).
- ^{eee} "Houdini" re-entered the top 10 at number 6 on 11 January 2024 (week ending).
- ^{fff} "Water" re-entered the top 10 at number 7 on 11 January 2024 (week ending).
- ^{ggg} "Stick Season" re-entered the top 10 at number 10 on 18 April 2024 (week ending).
