= List of top 10 singles for 2023 in Australia =

This is a list of songs that charted in the top ten of the ARIA Charts in 2023.

== Top-ten singles ==
Key

Symbol	Meaning
◁	Indicates single's top 10 entry was also its ARIA top 50 debut
(#)	2023 Year-end top 10 single position and rank

List of ARIA top ten singles that peaked in 2023
Top ten entry date	Single	Artist(s)	Peak	Peak date	Weeks in top ten	Refs.
Singles from 2022
31 October	"Karma"	Taylor Swift featuring Ice Spice	2	5 June	5	
12 December	"Creepin'" ◁	Metro Boomin, The Weeknd and 21 Savage	7	23 January	12	
19 December	"Kill Bill" ◁ (#3)	SZA	1	16 January	27	
Singles from 2023
9 January	"Escapism" (#10)	Raye featuring 070 Shake	3	23 January	16	
23 January	"Flowers" ◁ (#1)	Miley Cyrus	1	23 January	27	
6 February	"Say Nothing"	Flume featuring May-a	4	6 February	1	
13 February	"Love Again"	The Kid Laroi	6	13 February	1	
20 February	"Boy's a Liar" (#5)	PinkPantheress	2	27 February	19	
20 February	"Sure Thing"	Miguel	6	27 February	2	
20 February	"Players"	Coi Leray	7	27 February	6	
6 March	"Die for You" (#6)	The Weeknd and Ariana Grande	3	6 March	18	
6 March	"Last Night" (#2)	Morgan Wallen	1	17 April	37	
6 March	"Until I Found You"	Stephen Sanchez and Em Beihold	8	13 March	9	
3 April	"Eyes Closed" ◁	Ed Sheeran	6	3 April	4	
17 April	"Search & Rescue" ◁	Drake	8	17 April	1	
24 April	"Daylight" ◁	David Kushner	4	22 May	14	
24 April	"Fast Car"	Luke Combs	2	28 August	24	
24 April	"The Beginning: Cupid"	Fifty Fifty	2	8 May	12	
1 May	"Double Fantasy" ◁	The Weeknd featuring Future	9	1 May	1	
29 May	"All My Life"	Lil Durk featuring J. Cole	9	29 May	3	
12 June	"Sprinter" ◁	Dave and Central Cee	1	12 June	17	
10 July	"Vampire" ◁	Olivia Rodrigo	1	10 July	15	
17 July	"I Can See You (Taylor's Version) (From The Vault)" ◁	Taylor Swift	5	17 July	1	
17 July	"Enchanted (Taylor's Version)" ◁	Taylor Swift	7	17 July	1	
17 July	"Mine (Taylor's Version)" ◁	Taylor Swift	10	17 July	1	
24 July	"Seven" ◁	Jungkook featuring Latto	2	24 July	2	
24 July	"F*kumean"	Gunna	7	24 July	5	
24 July	"What Was I Made For?" ◁	Billie Eilish	1	7 August	8	
31 July	"Barbie World"	Nicki Minaj, Ice Spice and Aqua	3	31 July	5	
31 July	"Dance the Night"	Dua Lipa	3	14 August	11	
7 August	"Meltdown" ◁	Travis Scott featuring Drake	8	7 August	1	
14 August	"Paint the Town Red" ◁	Doja Cat	1	28 August	25	
21 August	"Bad Idea Right?" ◁	Olivia Rodrigo	3	18 September	2	
4 September	"Popular"	The Weeknd featuring Playboi Carti and Madonna	8	11 September	2	
18 September	"Get Him Back!" ◁	Olivia Rodrigo	6	18 September	1	
18 September	"All-American B**ch" ◁	Olivia Rodrigo	10	18 September	1	
25 September	"Greedy" ◁	Tate McRae	2	9 October	29	
25 September	"Strangers"	Kenya Grace	2	2 October	11	
9 October	"3D" ◁	Jungkook featuring Jack Harlow	7	9 October	1	
9 October	"I Remember Everything"	Zach Bryan featuring Kacey Musgraves	6	23 October	16	
16 October	"First Person Shooter" ◁	Drake featuring J. Cole	4	16 October	1	
16 October	"IDGAF" ◁	Drake featuring Yeat	6	16 October	1	
16 October	"Virginia Beach" ◁	Drake	9	16 October	1	
23 October	"Something in the Orange" (#7)	Zach Bryan	6	18 December	9	
23 October	"Water"	Tyla	6	30 October	9	
30 October	"Too Much" ◁	The Kid Laroi, Jungkook and Central Cee	10	30 October	1	
6 November	"Is It Over Now? (Taylor's Version) (from the Vault)" ◁	Taylor Swift	1	6 November	5	
6 November	"Now That We Don't Talk (Taylor's Version) (from the Vault)" ◁	Taylor Swift	2	6 November	2	
6 November	"Say Don't Go (Taylor's Version) (from the Vault)" ◁	Taylor Swift	3	6 November	1	
6 November	"Sl**! (Taylor's Version) (from the Vault)" ◁	Taylor Swift	4	6 November	1	
6 November	"Style (Taylor's Version)" ◁	Taylor Swift	7	6 November	1	
6 November	"Suburban Legends (Taylor's Version) (from the Vault)" ◁	Taylor Swift	8	6 November	1	
6 November	"Blank Space (Taylor's Version)" ◁	Taylor Swift	9	6 November	1	
13 November	"Now and Then" ◁	The Beatles	6	13 November	1	
20 November	"Lovin on Me" ◁	Jack Harlow	1	20 November	19	
20 November	"Houdini" ◁	Dua Lipa	7	20 November	1	

=== 2021 peaks ===
List of ARIA top ten singles in 2023 that peaked in 2021
Top ten entry date	Single	Artist(s)	Peak	Peak date	Weeks in top ten	References
20 September	"Shivers" ◁	Ed Sheeran	2	8 November	34	

=== 2022 peaks ===
List of ARIA top ten singles in 2023 that peaked in 2022
Top ten entry date	Single	Artist(s)	Peak	Peak date	Weeks in top ten	References
11 April	"As It Was" ◁ (#9)	Harry Styles	1	11 April	44	
18 July	"I Ain't Worried"	OneRepublic	2	12 September	27	
12 September	"I'm Good (Blue)"	David Guetta and Bebe Rexha	1	19 September	18	
19 September	"B.O.T.A. (Baddest of Them All)"	Eliza Rose and Interplanetary Criminal	4	26 September	9	
3 October	"Unholy" ◁	Sam Smith & Kim Petras	1	3 October	22	
24 October	"Miss You" ◁	Oliver Tree and Robin Schulz	4	24 October	14	
31 October	"Anti-Hero" ◁ (#4)	Taylor Swift	1	31 October	32	
21 November	"Made You Look"	Meghan Trainor	3	5 December	11	

=== 2024 peaks ===
List of ARIA top ten singles in 2023 that peaked in 2024
Top ten entry date	Single	Artist(s)	Peak	Peak date	Weeks in top ten	References
3 July	"Cruel Summer" (#8)	Taylor Swift	1	26 February	42	
25 September	"Prada"	Cassö, Raye and D-Block Europe	3	5 February	22	

=== Holiday season ===
Holiday titles first making the ARIA Top 50 top ten during the 2022–23 holiday season
Top ten entry date	Single	Artist(s)	Peak	Peak date	Weeks in top ten	Ref.
2 January 2023	"Jingle Bell Rock"	Bobby Helms	6	2 January 2023	2	
2 January 2023	"Holly Jolly Christmas"	Michael Bublé	7	2 January 2023	2	
2 January 2023	"It's the Most Wonderful Time of the Year"	Andy Williams	8	2 January 2023	2	
2 January 2023	"Sleigh Ride"	The Ronettes	9	2 January 2023	1	
2 January 2023	"Do They Know It's Christmas?"	Band Aid	10	2 January 2023	1	

Recurring holiday titles, appearing in the ARIA Top 50 top ten in previous holiday seasons
Top ten entry date	Single	Artist(s)	Peak	Peak date	Weeks in top ten	Ref.
1 January 2018	"All I Want for Christmas Is You"	Mariah Carey	1	31 December 2018	21	
31 December 2018	"Last Christmas"	Wham!	2	28 December 2020	13	
30 December 2019	"It's Beginning to Look a Lot Like Christmas"	Michael Bublé	3	3 January 2022	8	
28 December 2020	"Santa Tell Me"	Ariana Grande	5	3 January 2022	6	
3 January 2022	"Rockin' Around the Christmas Tree"	Brenda Lee	2	2 January 2023	7	

== See also ==
- List of number-one singles of 2023 (Australia)
