= List of Billboard Pop Airplay number-one songs of 2023 =

This is a list of songs which reached number one on the Billboard Pop Airplay chart in 2023.

== Chart history ==
Key
†	Indicates best-performing song of 2023

Issue date	Song	Artist(s)	Ref.
January 7	"Unholy"	Sam Smith and Kim Petras	
January 14	"Unholy"	Sam Smith and Kim Petras	
January 21	"Anti-Hero"	Taylor Swift	
January 28	"I'm Good (Blue)"	David Guetta and Bebe Rexha	
February 4	"I'm Good (Blue)"	David Guetta and Bebe Rexha	
February 11	"Die for You"	The Weeknd	
February 18	"Die for You"	The Weeknd	
February 25	"Flowers"	Miley Cyrus	
March 4	"Flowers"	Miley Cyrus	
March 11	"Flowers"	Miley Cyrus	
March 18	"Flowers"	Miley Cyrus	
March 25	"Flowers"	Miley Cyrus	
April 1	"Flowers"	Miley Cyrus	
April 8	"Flowers"	Miley Cyrus	
April 15	"Flowers"	Miley Cyrus	
April 22	"Kill Bill"	SZA	
April 29	"Flowers"	Miley Cyrus	
May 6	"Flowers"	Miley Cyrus	
May 13	"Calm Down" †	Rema and Selena Gomez	
May 20	"Calm Down" †	Rema and Selena Gomez	
May 27	"Sure Thing"	Miguel	
June 3	"Sure Thing"	Miguel	
June 10	"Sure Thing"	Miguel	
June 17	"Sure Thing"	Miguel	
June 24	"Calm Down" †	Rema and Selena Gomez	
July 1	"Sure Thing"	Miguel	
July 8	"Sure Thing"	Miguel	
July 15	"Calm Down" †	Rema and Selena Gomez	
July 22	"Karma"	Taylor Swift	
July 29	"Calm Down" †	Rema and Selena Gomez	
August 5	"Cruel Summer"	Taylor Swift	
August 12	"Cruel Summer"	Taylor Swift	
August 19	"Cruel Summer"	Taylor Swift	
August 26	"Cruel Summer"	Taylor Swift	
September 2	"Cruel Summer"	Taylor Swift	
September 9	"Cruel Summer"	Taylor Swift	
September 16	"Dance the Night"	Dua Lipa	
September 23	"Dance the Night"	Dua Lipa	
September 30	"Cruel Summer"	Taylor Swift	
October 7	"Cruel Summer"	Taylor Swift	
October 14	"Cruel Summer"	Taylor Swift	
October 21	"Cruel Summer"	Taylor Swift	
October 28	"Paint the Town Red"	Doja Cat	
November 4	"Paint the Town Red"	Doja Cat	
November 11	"Paint the Town Red"	Doja Cat	
November 18	"Paint the Town Red"	Doja Cat	
November 25	"Paint the Town Red"	Doja Cat	
December 2	"Paint the Town Red"	Doja Cat	
December 9	"Paint the Town Red"	Doja Cat	
December 16	"Greedy"	Tate McRae	
December 23	"Greedy"	Tate McRae	
December 30	"Greedy"	Tate McRae	

== See also ==
- 2023 in American music
