= Bad Idea Right? =

2023 single by Olivia Rodrigo

Single by Olivia Rodrigo

from the album Guts
- B-side: "Bad Idea Right?" (demo)
- Written: 2022
- Released: August 11, 2023
- Studio: Amusement (Los Angeles)
- Genre: Pop-punk; pop rock; grunge; new wave; indie pop; power pop; synth-pop
- Length: 3:04
- Label: Geffen
- Songwriters: Olivia Rodrigo; Dan Nigro
- Producer: Dan Nigro

Olivia Rodrigo singles chronology
"Vampire" (2023)	"Bad Idea Right?" (2023)	"Get Him Back!" (2023)

Music video
- "Bad Idea Right?" on YouTube

"Bad Idea Right?" (stylized in all lowercase) is a song by the American singer-songwriter Olivia Rodrigo from her second studio album, Guts (2023). Rodrigo co-wrote the track with its producer, Dan Nigro. Geffen Records released it as the album's second single on August 11, 2023. A pop-punk and pop rock song influenced by various other pop and rock subgenres, "Bad Idea Right?" features Rodrigo contemplating whether it is a good idea to reconnect with her ex-boyfriend by weighing the pros and cons.

"Bad Idea Right?" received positive reviews from music critics, who praised its humorous lyrics and Rodrigo's vocals, describing the song as a departure from Guts's lead single "Vampire" (2023). "Bad Idea Right?" was included on several year-end lists of the best songs of 2023. It charted within the top 10 in Australia, Canada, Ireland, New Zealand, the United Kingdom, and the United States. The song also received double platinum certifications in Australia, Brazil, and Canada.

Petra Collins directed the music video for "Bad Idea Right?", which depicts Rodrigo crowd-surfing at a house party and riding a pickup truck and a bus to go to her ex-boyfriend's house. It features guest appearances by Madison Hu, Iris Apatow, and Tate McRae and references several television shows and films. Rodrigo sang the song on BBC Radio 1's Live Lounge and as the opener on her 2024–2025 concert tour, the Guts World Tour. Courting and Kelly Clarkson have performed cover versions of it.

== Background and release ==
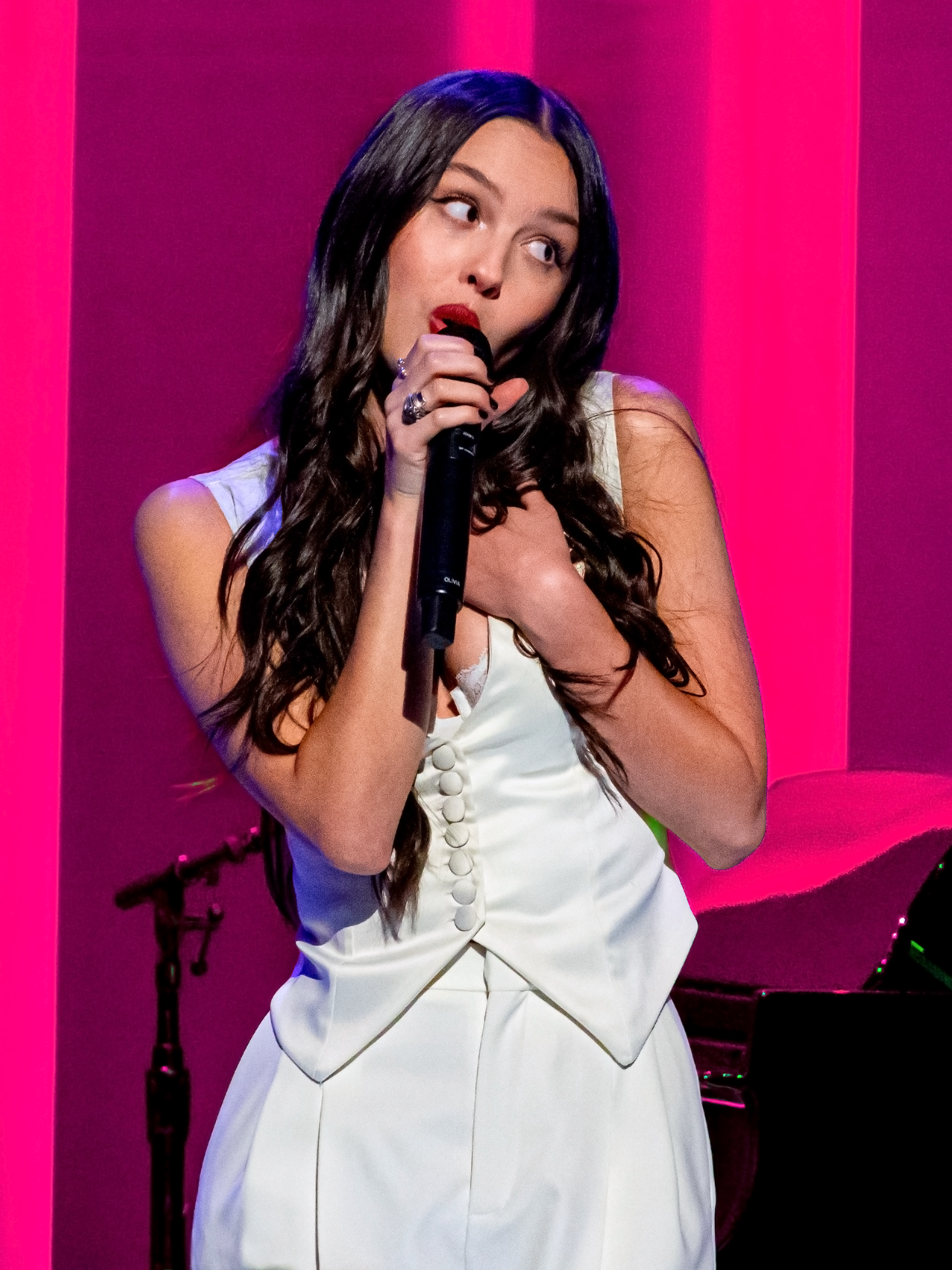
"Bad Idea Right?" began as a joke about Olivia Rodrigo (pictured in 2023) reconnecting with an ex-partner.

Olivia Rodrigo's debut studio album, Sour (2021), was released in May 2021. Following the album's release, she took a break from songwriting for six months. Rodrigo conceived the follow-up album, Guts (2023), while experiencing "lots of confusion, mistakes, awkwardness & good old-fashioned teen angst". Sour's producer, Dan Nigro, returned to produce every track on it. After writing over 100 songs, the two chose the more rock-oriented tracks for the album because those songs received stronger reactions from her audience during live performances.

Early in the creation process of Guts in 2022, Rodrigo and Nigro started writing the chorus of "Bad Idea Right?" as a joke about her reconnecting with an ex-partner. They liked it so much that it was made into a full song. According to Rodrigo, they experimented with their most unconventional ideas on it, including a section in one of the choruses where her voice gradually crescendos and sounds like an instrument. Nigro considered "Bad Idea Right?" his favorite song and pushed for it to be released as the lead single from the album; he was enthusiastic about showing people the "more sarcastic side" of Rodrigo, but others involved in the decision preferred "Vampire". The latter was ultimately chosen and released on June 30, 2023.

On August 1, 2023, Rodrigo revealed the album's tracklist, which featured "Bad Idea Right?" as the second track. Six days later, she e-mailed her fans that the song sounded distinct from "Vampire" and showcased "a little more fun & playful" side of Guts. Rodrigo shared its artwork, a hazy image of her posing behind a glass wall with the song title scrawled in red lipstick in front of her face, the same day. "Bad Idea Right?" was released as the second single from Guts on August 11. Geffen Records promoted the song to contemporary hit radio stations in the United States four days later, and it was also released as a 7-inch vinyl single in some countries with the demo as its B-side.

== Composition ==
"Bad Idea Right?"
"Bad Idea Right?" is a rock-based pop-punk, pop rock, grunge, indie pop, new wave, power pop, and synth-pop song, which incorporates guitars alongside elastic bass lines and influences from several genres.

"Bad Idea Right?" is three minutes and four seconds long. Nigro handled production and vocal production. He engineered the song with Sam Stewart, Dan Viafore, and Sterling Laws. Nigro plays guitar, percussion, bass, and drum programming; Stewart plays electric guitar; and Laws plays drums. Spike Stent handled mixing with assistance from Matt Wolach. Recording took place in Amusement Studios in Los Angeles.

"Bad Idea Right?" is a rock song in the styles of pop-punk, pop rock, grunge, indie pop, new wave, power pop, and synth-pop with influences of alternative rock, jangle rock, and pop. Multiple critics identified it as reminiscent of 1990s music. (Note: Stereogum's Chris DeVille believed it has "major '90s pop rock energy", People's Ilana Kaplan described it as a 1990s grunge song, and Time's Maura Johnston thought it channeled 1990s alternative rock.) Lindsay Zoladz of The New York Times believed the song employed call and response hooks similar to 1960s girl groups alongside an early 2000s elastic pop-punk bassline. Along with bass and drums, "Bad Idea Right?" heavily features guitars in its instrumentation, influenced by the riot grrrl movement. (Note: Riot grrrl is a feminist punk movement that was started by female rock musicians and activists during the early 1990s within the United States in Olympia, Washington.) Rodrigo uses a spoken-sung delivery in parts of the song, with the verses and chorus almost completely spoken, but the track includes a melodic pre-chorus. It incorporates layered chants, "blah blah blah" harmonies, and crescendos. Music critics compared "Bad Idea Right?" to the works of Avril Lavigne, Wet Leg, Soccer Mommy, the Waitresses, Toni Basil, Hole, Wolf Alice, Pixies, Pavement, Metallica, Weezer, the Cars, and Lindsay Lohan's 2004 song "Drama Queen (That Girl)". Paolo Ragusa of Consequence thought the song recalled pop rock music featured in the television series Glee (2009–2015) and the film Freaky Friday (2003).

In "Bad Idea Right?", Rodrigo contemplates whether it is a good idea to reconnect with her ex-boyfriend by weighing the pros and cons. Narrated as an inner monologue, some of the song's lyrics depict her trying to convince herself not to do it while others see her justifying the encounter. In the first verse, Rodrigo describes being out and intoxicated while receiving a phone call from the ex in real-time, perceiving hidden meanings in what he is saying. While she briefly feels that she should "probably not" reconnect with him, Rodrigo dismisses this thought. Rodrigo repeatedly questions whether it is "a bad idea, right?" in the pre-chorus but concludes that it is fine. She tries to justify the decision to her friends, stating that she only considers him a friend but admitting that is "the biggest lie I ever said". Rodrigo also tries to pretend that she innocently slipped and fell on the ex's bed. She recalls telling her friends that she was sleeping, but neglecting to mention that she was at another person's apartment. Pitchfork's Cat Zhang interpreted the song as Rodrigo's thoughts while under the influence of alcohol and believed that the ex might have been less attractive than Rodrigo describes him as in the song.

== Critical reception ==
"Bad Idea Right?" received positive reviews from music critics. On August 11, 2023, Pitchfork named the song as the "Best New Track". Zoladz described "Bad Idea Right?" as one of Rodrigo's "spunkiest, funniest and most irresistible singles yet". Billboard's Jason Lipshutz ranked the song as the fifth-best track on Guts and believed it sounded fresher with repeated listens as he better understood the gradations of her vocal performance. Sputnikmusic's Sowing thought it was more effective in the context of Guts than upon its release as a single. Alex Berry of Clash enjoyed how it contrasted the ballads on Guts and believed it proved Rodrigo's versatility, establishing her distinctive style.

Critics described "Bad Idea Right?" as a departure from the serious and balladic nature of "Vampire". (Note: These included Pitchfork's Shaad D'Souza, Exclaim!'s Kaelen Bell, American Songwriter's Alex Hopper, People's Ilana Kaplan, and Consequence's Jo Vito.) Punch Liwanag of the Manila Bulletin praised the energetic and up-tempo production of "Bad Idea Right?" as a welcome change from the piano-driven ballads that had famed Rodrigo. Reviewers thought the song was youthful like her previous music but lyrically reflected themes more oriented to college than high school. Some believed its lyrics were funny and successfully made the idea of Rodrigo reconnecting with her ex sound appealing. Writing for Vulture, Craig Jenkins thought "Bad Idea Right?" signified Rodrigo's ability to create songs deeply grounded in her personal experiences that still resonate universally. Lines from the song were included on GQ's list of the album's standout and "gutsiest" lyrics and Nylon's list of its impeccable lyrics.

Others praised Rodrigo's performance on "Bad Idea Right?". Pitchfork's Shaad D'Souza called it one of the year's standout pop performances and Rodrigo a great performer; he noted that her strong commitment to playing a character made the song succeed, which was echoed by the Los Angeles Times's Mikael Wood. The Line of Best Fit's Matthew Kim thought her impassive delivery of the line "fuck it, it's fine" amplified and complemented the album's diverse spectrum of emotions, while Zoladz thought it was done with precise comedic timing. Mark Richardson of The Wall Street Journal and Wood believed "Bad Idea Right?" benefited from her background as an actress, with the latter stating it displayed "pitch-perfect line readings that shift between comic registers on a dime — from naturalistic to screwball, faux-earnest to deadpan".

=== Accolades ===
In September 2023, Jessie Atkinson of NME listed "Bad Idea Right?" as Rodrigo's sixth-best song and Rob Sheffield of Rolling Stone ranked it seventh in her discography. Sheffield described the song as "devilishly catchy" and picked his favorite lyric: "I'm sure I've seen much hotter men/But I really can't remember when." It was included on critical lists of the best songs of 2023 at number one by Stereogum's Tom Breihan and Time, number seven by The Guardian, number 10 by Zoladz, number 11 by The Fader, number 12 by NME, number 83 by Treble, and unranked by GQ, NPR, and The Skinny. Mel Wang of Rolling Stone Philippines ranked "Bad Idea Right?" as Rodrigo's fifth-best song in June 2026.

== Commercial performance ==
"Bad Idea Right?" debuted at number 10 on the US Billboard Hot 100, becoming the sixth top ten single of Rodrigo's career, and Guts's second after the chart topper "Vampire". Following the album's release, "Bad Idea Right?" rose from number twenty-six to its peak position of number seven on the chart issued for September 23, 2023. The song also debuted at number one on the Hot Rock & Alternative Songs chart. In Canada, it reached number nine on the Canadian Hot 100 on the chart of September 23 and was certified triple platinum by Music Canada. "Bad Idea Right?" charted at number three on the UK Singles Chart and became Rodrigo's sixth top 10 single. The song received a platinum certification in the United Kingdom from the British Phonographic Industry, and the Official Charts Company reported that it was her 11th-biggest song in the country in February 2024.

In Australia, "Bad Idea Right?" peaked at number three and became Rodrigo's sixth top 10 single. The song was certified double platinum by the Australian Recording Industry Association (ARIA) for selling 140,000 equivalent units. It reached number four in New Zealand and became her eighth top 10 song. "Bad Idea Right?" received a platinum certification from Recorded Music NZ. The song charted at number five on the Billboard Global 200. It also peaked within the top 30 at number 4 in Ireland, number 11 in Singapore, number 14 in Greece and Latvia, number 17 in Panama, number 19 in Portugal, number 27 in Norway, and number 29 in the Netherlands. "Bad Idea Right?" received a double platinum certification in Brazil and gold in Belgium, Mexico, Poland, Portugal, and Spain.

== Music video ==
Petra Collins, who had directed the music videos for "Good 4 U" (2021), "Brutal" (2021), and "Vampire", also directed the one for "Bad Idea Right?", which was influenced by 1990s B movie and horror-comedy aesthetics. While teasing its release date in a TikTok video, Rodrigo revealed that it would feature appearances by her Bizaardvark co-star Madison Hu, the actress Iris Apatow, and the singer-songwriter Tate McRae, whom she described as "my favorite girlz". She sent a flyer to her fans through her newsletter, inviting them to an event directed by Collins to be held at a made-up address for the promotion. The video was released alongside the song on August 11.

The video begins with a house party, where Rodrigo, Hu, Apatow, and McRae meet in a bathroom. Ignoring several attendees who warn her that it is a bad idea to see her ex-boyfriend, Rodrigo crowd-surfs and then leaves to go to his house. She rides in the back of a pickup truck while it rains and boards a bus where someone throws a slushy at her. Rodrigo reaches the ex's house and gets into bed with him as it catches on fire. Some props featured in the video contain easter eggs related to the tracklist and lyrics of Guts.

Reviewers compared the video to different television shows and films. Fans and critics believed it directly referenced the teen drama shows Euphoria and Glee. The A.V. Club's Emma Keates likened the party scene to the 1995 film Clueless and the final scene with the burning bed to the 2018 film Hereditary and the television series The Boys. Keates and Variety's Thania Garcia and Ellise Shafer believed the video recalled the 1990s, and Elle's Alyssa Bailey described it as "an especially fun time" that suited the song. It was nominated for Best Art Direction at the 2024 MTV Video Music Awards.

== Live performances and other usage ==
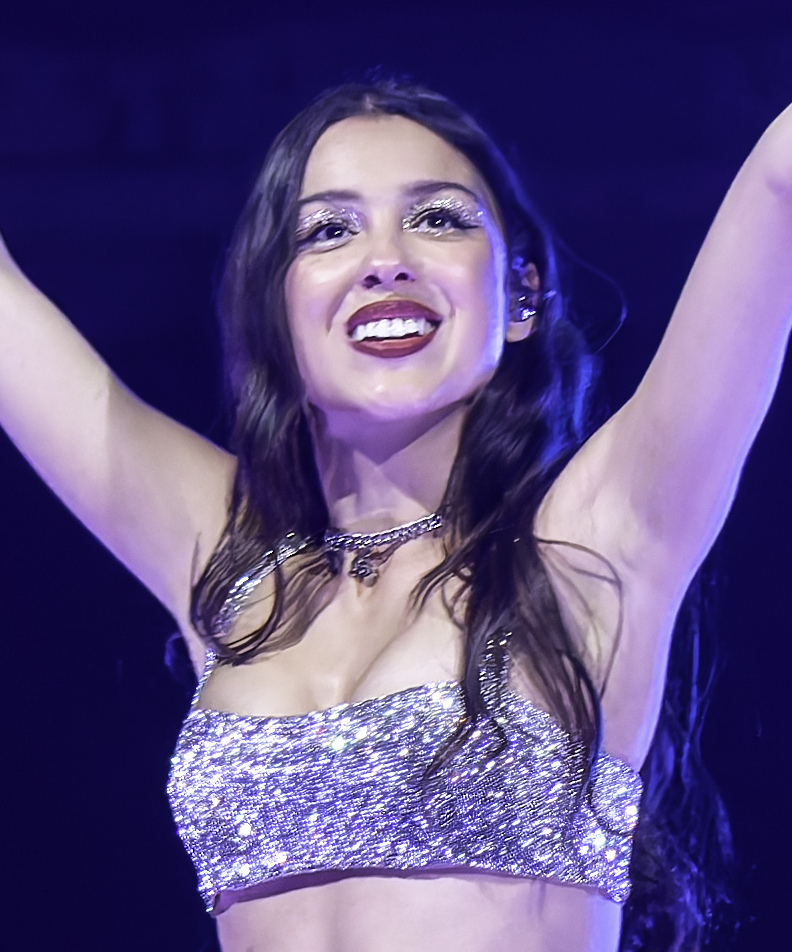
Rodrigo performing on the Guts World Tour in May 2024

Rodrigo's performance of "Bad Idea Right?" at BBC Radio 1's Live Lounge was uploaded on December 25, 2023. She opened her 2024–2025 concert tour, the Guts World Tour, with the song. After a black-and-white interlude of her sprinting across a hallway was played, Rodrigo performed it with an all-female five-member band and two background singers in a silver two-piece outfit. Billboard's Rania Aniftos thought she carried herself with confidence and showcased standout vocals that stayed consistent throughout the show. Lynn Green of The Columbus Dispatch noted that "Bad Idea Right?" was extremely difficult to hear as the audience shouted the song loudly, and Consequence's Scoop Harrison believed that along with the two following songs on the set list, it constituted a "one-two-three punch". Writing for USA Today, Melissa Ruggieri noted that the building shook from the fans' jumping during the song's performance. It was included in the tour's associated concert film, Olivia Rodrigo: Guts World Tour (2024). In 2025, Rodrigo sang "Bad Idea Right?" during a string of festivals including Lollapalooza (Chile, Argentina, Brazil, France, and the US), Estéreo Picnic, Governors Ball, Pinkpop, Glastonbury, Mad Cool, and Osheaga. She performed the song at the Park Avenue Armory during a concert hosted by American Express in October 2025, and in 2026 at a private concert at the Echo and for Spotify Billions Club. In June 2026, Rodrigo opened her Primavera Sound set with it.

On January 23, 2024, Courting released an indie cover of "Bad Idea Right?", which included a scream from the frontman Sean Murphy-O'Neill towards the end. Stereogum's Danielle Chelosky and NME's Hollie Geraghty believed they ramped up the energy of Rodrigo's version; the former thought the opening riff was exactly like the 1975's 2018 single "It's Not Living (If It's Not with You)" but it was still "true to the original". Kelly Clarkson performed a pop punk cover of the song on The Kelly Clarkson Show on May 16, 2024, in a cheetah-print top. She delivered acrobatic vocal runs, joined by her band and two backup singers who added layered harmonies in front of red stage lights. Hannah Dailey of Billboard believed that Clarkson's vocal performance added "some oomph" to it, and Sammi Burke of Parade opined that she "totally nailed" it.

== Personnel ==
Credits are adapted from Qobuz.

- Dan Nigro – producer, songwriter, engineering, guitar, percussion, vocal production, bass, drum programming, background vocals
- Olivia Rodrigo – vocals, background vocals, songwriter
- Chappell Roan - background vocals
- Sam Stewart – engineering, electric guitar
- Dan Viafore – engineering
- Sterling Laws – engineering, drums
- Spike Stent – mixing
- Matt Wolach – mixing assistance

== Charts ==
=== Weekly charts ===
Weekly chart performance
Chart (2023)	Peak position
Australia (ARIA)	3
Austria (Ö3 Austria Top 40)	35
Canada Hot 100 (Billboard)	9
Canada CHR/Top 40 (Billboard)	21
Canada Hot AC (Billboard)	45
Canada Rock (Billboard)	45
Czech Republic Singles Digital (ČNS IFPI)	35
France (SNEP)	122
Germany (GfK)	64
Global 200 (Billboard)	5
Greece International (IFPI)	14
Iceland (Tónlistinn)	32
Ireland (IRMA)	4
Japan Hot Overseas (Billboard Japan)	6
Lithuania (AGATA)	40
Netherlands (Single Top 100)	29
Netherlands (Tipparade)	10
New Zealand (Recorded Music NZ)	4
Nigeria (TurnTable Top 100)	61
Norway (VG-lista)	27
Panama (Monitor Latino)	17
Panama (PRODUCE)	23
Poland (Polish Streaming Top 100)	67
Portugal (AFP)	19
Singapore (RIAS)	11
Slovakia Singles Digital (ČNS IFPI)	43
South Korea BGM (Circle)	130
South Korea Download (Circle)	199
Spain (Promusicae)	73
Sweden (Sverigetopplistan)	57
Switzerland (Schweizer Hitparade)	58
UK Singles (Official Charts)	3
US Billboard Hot 100	7
US Adult Contemporary (Billboard)	26
US Adult Pop Airplay (Billboard)	15
US Dance Airplay (Billboard)	35
US Hot Rock & Alternative Songs (Billboard)	1
US Pop Airplay (Billboard)	11
Venezuela (Record Report)	43
Vietnam (Vietnam Hot 100)	97

=== Year-end charts ===
2023 year-end chart performance
Chart (2023)	Position
US Hot Rock & Alternative Songs (Billboard)	11
US Streaming Songs (Billboard)	67

2024 year-end chart performance
Chart (2024)	Position
US Hot Rock & Alternative Songs (Billboard)	26

== Certifications ==
Certifications
Region	Certification	Certified units/sales
Australia (ARIA)	3× Platinum	210,000^{‡}
Austria (IFPI Austria)	Gold	15,000^{‡}
Belgium (BRMA)	Gold	20,000^{‡}
Brazil (Pro-Música Brasil)	2× Platinum	80,000^{‡}
Canada (Music Canada)	3× Platinum	240,000^{‡}
Mexico (AMPROFON)	Gold	70,000^{‡}
New Zealand (RMNZ)	Platinum	30,000^{‡}
Poland (ZPAV)	Gold	25,000^{‡}
Portugal (AFP)	Gold	5,000^{‡}
Spain (Promusicae)	Gold	30,000^{‡}
United Kingdom (BPI)	Platinum	600,000^{‡}
^{‡} Sales+streaming figures based on certification alone.

== Release history ==
Release dates and formats
Region	Date	Format(s)	Label	Ref.
Various	August 11, 2023	Digital download; streaming	Geffen	
United States	August 15, 2023	Contemporary hit radio	Geffen	
United States	December 18, 2023	7-inch	Geffen	
Japan	December 22, 2023	7-inch	Interscope; Universal Japan	
Germany	December 22, 2023	7-inch	Universal Germany	
United Kingdom	December 22, 2023	7-inch	Polydor	

== See also ==
- List of Billboard Hot 100 top-ten singles in 2023
- List of UK top-ten singles in 2023
- List of top 10 singles for 2023 in Australia
