= Die for You (The Weeknd song) =

2017 single by the Weeknd

Single by the Weeknd

from the album Starboy
- Released: September 19, 2017
- Recorded: 2016
- Studio: Conway, Westlake Beverly (Los Angeles, California); Matza Ball Studio (New York, New York); The Treehouse X (Suffolk, United Kingdom)
- Genre: R&B
- Length: 4:20 (album version): 3:40 (radio edit)
- Label: XO; Republic
- Songwriters: Abel Tesfaye; Martin McKinney; Mejdi Rhars; Dylan Wiggins; Magnus Høiberg; William Thomas Walsh; Henry Walter
- Producers: Doc McKinney; Cirkut; The Weeknd; Cashmere Cat; Prince 85

The Weeknd singles chronology
"A Lie" (2017)	"Die for You" (2017)	"Secrets" (2017)

Music video
- "Die for You" on YouTube

"Die for You" is a song by the Canadian singer-songwriter the Weeknd, from his third studio album, Starboy (2016). The song was sent to US rhythmic contemporary radio on September 19, 2017, as the seventh single from the album. It was written by the Weeknd, Doc McKinney, Cirkut, Prince 85, Cashmere Cat, Dylan Wiggins, and Billy Walsh, and produced by the former five.

The song was initially a moderate success, achieving a peak within the top 50 of the US Billboard Hot 100. In 2022, the song experienced a resurgence in popularity due to the online social media application TikTok. The song thereafter impacted US contemporary hit radio and peaked at number six on the Hot 100. On February 24, 2023, the Weeknd released a remix of "Die for You" with American singer-songwriter Ariana Grande, which was included on the deluxe edition of Starboy. The remix propelled the song to number one on the Hot 100, marking both artists' seventh number-one single on the chart, following both artists' sixth, the remix of "Save Your Tears" (2021). The remix also reached a new peak at number two on the Billboard Global 200 and the Canadian Hot 100. According to the International Federation of the Phonographic Industry (IFPI), the remix was the fourth best-selling global single of 2023, earning 1.78 billion subscription streams equivalents globally.

== Background and release ==
In a 2016 interview with Zane Lowe of Beats 1 Radio, the Weeknd said that "Die for You" was the last song to finish for his album Starboy and was completed merely a week before the album dropped. It was one of the tracks on the album to be previewed before its release as part of the 12-minute-long short film Mania, released on November 23. The song was officially released on November 25, 2016, as an album track.

"Die for You" received early airplay from urban contemporary and urban adult contemporary radio in August 2017. It was officially serviced to US rhythmic contemporary radio on September 19, 2017, as the sixth single from Starboy in the United States. The song was also scheduled to be sent to US contemporary hit radio on December 5, but its release to the format in the country was cancelled for unknown reasons. Following its release as a single in North America, the song charted modestly across various Billboard component charts and became a moderate Canadian hit. "Die for You" would later then be included on the track list of the Weeknd's second greatest hits album, The Highlights, which was released on February 5, 2021.

After a resurgence in popularity due to increased usage on the video-sharing app TikTok in September 2021, its official music video was released on November 25, 2021, alongside standalone digital release on Apple Music with its own artwork. As a result, the song would begin receiving contemporary hit radio airplay in early August 2022, following its initial cancellation from the release in 2017. In February 2023, the Weeknd uploaded a live performance video of the song from his After Hours til Dawn Tour to promote his HBO concert special the Weeknd: Live at SoFi Stadium. A live version of the song from his performance at SoFi Stadium was later released to digital stores and streaming platforms in March 2023 with the release of his first live album Live at SoFi Stadium.

== Composition and lyrics ==
The song's sheet music, published by Sony/ATV Music Publishing at musicnotes.com, shows that "Die for You" is written in the key of C♯ minor and follows a tempo of 72 beats per minute. The vocals in the song span from the low note of C♯4 to the high note of C♯6.

In an interview with Zane Lowe, the Weeknd stated that "Die for You" was the final song finished for Starboy, and that it was difficult to write, specifically its lyrics.

== Critical reception ==
Mosi Reeves of Rolling Stone said that the song "is a euphoric slow jam where he finally summons the poetic sincerity he mined so easily in the past." Christopher Hooton of The Independent said that the song "has a tragic ecstasy to it befitting an end of the world party that happens to fall on New Years' Eve." Larry Bartleet of NME called it "banal, forgettable fluff".

== Commercial performance ==
In the United States, "Die for You" peaked at number 43 on the Billboard Hot 100 and charted for three weeks during its original run. Additionally, the song reached number 19 on the Hot R&B/Hip-Hop Songs chart. In Canada, the song peaked at number 35 on the Canadian Hot 100 and charted for 20 weeks.

In late 2021 and throughout 2022, "Die for You" saw an increase in consumption as the song went viral on the social media platform TikTok alongside fellow album track "Stargirl Interlude". This increase in streaming and sales led to the song's parent album to re-enter the top 40 on the Billboard 200 chart. It also led to the song entering the top 40 of multiple single charts across Asia and Oceania, with the song additionally reaching number 19 on the Billboard Global 200 chart and re-entering the Billboard Hot 100, peaking at number six. On February 6, 2023, "Die for You" topped the US Radio Songs chart, over six years after its arrival on Starboy. On the same day, it also reached number one on the mainstream top 40-based US Pop Airplay chart. On both charts, "Die for You" stayed at the top for two weeks.

== Use in media ==
"Die for You" was featured in the second season of the HBO comedy-drama television series Insecure. Due to its appearance in the show, the song led the THR's Top TV Songs Chart in August 2017.

== Music video ==
On November 25, 2021, to celebrate the five-year anniversary of Starboy's release, the Weeknd surprise-released the music video for "Die for You", directed by Christian Breslauer.

The video pays homage to the science fiction horror television series Stranger Things (2016-2025) and the science fiction film E.T. the Extra-Terrestrial (1982). It follows a boy who hides in a house and is discovered by a girl living in the same house. She learns that he has telekinetic powers and is absconding from government officials. The boy is eventually captured by the officials, but defeats the officials using his powers and escapes through a spaceship.

== Track listing ==
Digital / streaming single

1. "Die for You" – 4:20
2. "Die for You" (instrumental) – 4:19

Digital / streaming single

1. "Die for You" – 4:20
2. "Die for You" (music video) – 4:40

Digital / streaming single

1. "Die for You" – 4:20
2. "Die for You" (instrumental) – 4:19
3. "Die for You" (music video) – 4:40

Digital / streaming single

1. "Die for You" – 4:20
2. "Die for You" (instrumental) – 4:19
3. "Die for You" (sped up) – 3:43

== Charts ==
=== Weekly charts ===
Weekly chart performance for "Die for You"
Chart (2016–2026)	Peak position
Australia (ARIA)	3
Austria (Ö3 Austria Top 40)	7
Canada Hot 100 (Billboard)	19
Canada AC (Billboard)	18
Canada CHR/Top 40 (Billboard)	6
Canada Hot AC (Billboard)	22
Czech Republic Singles Digital (ČNS IFPI)	13
Denmark (Tracklisten)	3
France (SNEP)	20
Germany (GfK)	10
Global 200 (Billboard)	19
Greece International (IFPI)	7
Hungary (Single Top 40)	18
Hungary (Stream Top 40)	7
Ireland (IRMA)	3
Italy (FIMI)	31
Lithuania (AGATA)	35
Malaysia (Billboard)	11
Malaysia International (RIM)	2
MENA (IFPI)	3
Netherlands (Dutch Top 40)	13
Netherlands (Single Top 100)	5
Philippines (Billboard)	13
Portugal (AFP)	1
San Marino (SMRRTV Top 50)	27
Singapore (RIAS)	4
Slovakia (Singles Digitál Top 100)	9
Spain (Promusicae)	53
Sweden Heatseeker (Sverigetopplistan)	1
Switzerland (Schweizer Hitparade)	4
Thailand (IFPI)	20
Turkey (Radiomonitor Türkiye)	10
UAE (IFPI)	18
UK Singles (Official Charts)	3
UK Hip Hop/R&B (Official Charts)	1
US Billboard Hot 100	6
US Adult Contemporary (Billboard)	12
US Adult Pop Airplay (Billboard)	7
US Dance Airplay (Billboard)	11
US Hot R&B/Hip-Hop Songs (Billboard)	3
US R&B/Hip-Hop Airplay (Billboard)	26
US Pop Airplay (Billboard)	1
US Rhythmic Airplay (Billboard)	2
Vietnam (Vietnam Hot 100)	39

=== Year-end charts ===
2017 year-end chart performance for "Die for You"
Chart (2017)	Position
US Hot R&B Songs (Billboard)	35

2018 year-end chart performance for "Die for You"
Chart (2018)	Position
US Hot R&B Songs (Billboard)	44

2022 year-end chart performance for "Die for You"
Chart (2022)	Position
Global 200 (Billboard)	103
US Hot R&B/Hip-Hop Songs (Billboard)	49
Vietnam (Vietnam Hot 100)	96

2023 year-end chart performance for "Die for You"
Chart (2023)	Position
Australia (ARIA)	6
Denmark (Tracklisten)	41
Italy (FIMI)	97
Netherlands (Single Top 100)	24
Sweden (Sverigetopplistan)	42
Switzerland (Schweizer Hitparade)	55
UK Singles (OCC)	17
US Adult Contemporary (Billboard)	19
US Adult Top 40 (Billboard)	20
US Mainstream Top 40 (Billboard)	4
US Radio Songs (Billboard)	5
US Rhythmic (Billboard)	7
US Streaming Songs (Billboard)	15

2024 year-end chart performance for "Die for You"
Chart (2024)	Position
Australia Hip Hop/R&B (ARIA)	17
Philippines (Philippines Hot 100)	49
Portugal (AFP)	111

Chart (2025)	Position
Philippines (Philippines Hot 100)	77

== Certifications ==
Certifications for "Die for You"
Region	Certification	Certified units/sales
Australia (ARIA)	8× Platinum	560,000^{‡}
Austria (IFPI Austria)	Platinum	30,000^{‡}
Brazil (Pro-Música Brasil)	3× Platinum	180,000^{‡}
Canada (Music Canada)	8× Platinum	640,000^{‡}
Denmark (IFPI Danmark)	2× Platinum	180,000^{‡}
France (SNEP)	Diamond	333,333^{‡}
Germany (BVMI)	Gold	200,000^{‡}
Italy (FIMI)	2× Platinum	200,000^{‡}
New Zealand (RMNZ)	7× Platinum	210,000^{‡}
Poland (ZPAV)	3× Platinum	150,000^{‡}
Portugal (AFP)	8× Platinum	200,000^{‡}
Spain (Promusicae)	2× Platinum	120,000^{‡}
Switzerland (IFPI Switzerland)	Platinum	30,000^{‡}
United Kingdom (BPI)	3× Platinum	1,800,000^{‡}
United States (RIAA)	Diamond	10,000,000^{‡}
Streaming
Greece (IFPI Greece)	4× Platinum	8,000,000^{†}
^{‡} Sales+streaming figures based on certification alone.^{†} Streaming-only figures based on certification alone.

== Release history ==
Release history and formats for "Die for You"
Region	Date	Format(s)	Version(s)	Label(s)	Ref.
United States	September 19, 2017	Rhythmic contemporary radio	Original	XO; Republic	
Various	November 25, 2021	Digital download; streaming	Original; instrumental	XO; Republic	
United States	August 9, 2022	Contemporary hit radio	Radio edit	XO; Republic	
Various	February 4, 2023	Digital download; streaming	Sped up	XO; Republic	

== SZA remix ==
On October 4, 2021, an unreleased remix of "Die for You" featuring singer-songwriter SZA premiered on the eighteenth episode of the Weeknd's Apple Music 1 radio show Memento Mori, following a streaming surge the song received in September of that year. In November 2022, the Weeknd and SZA both publicly expressed interest in re-recording her verse for the remix. The two artists would later go on to discuss the matter although an official release of the remix has yet to come to fruition.

== Ariana Grande remix ==
"Die for You" (remix)
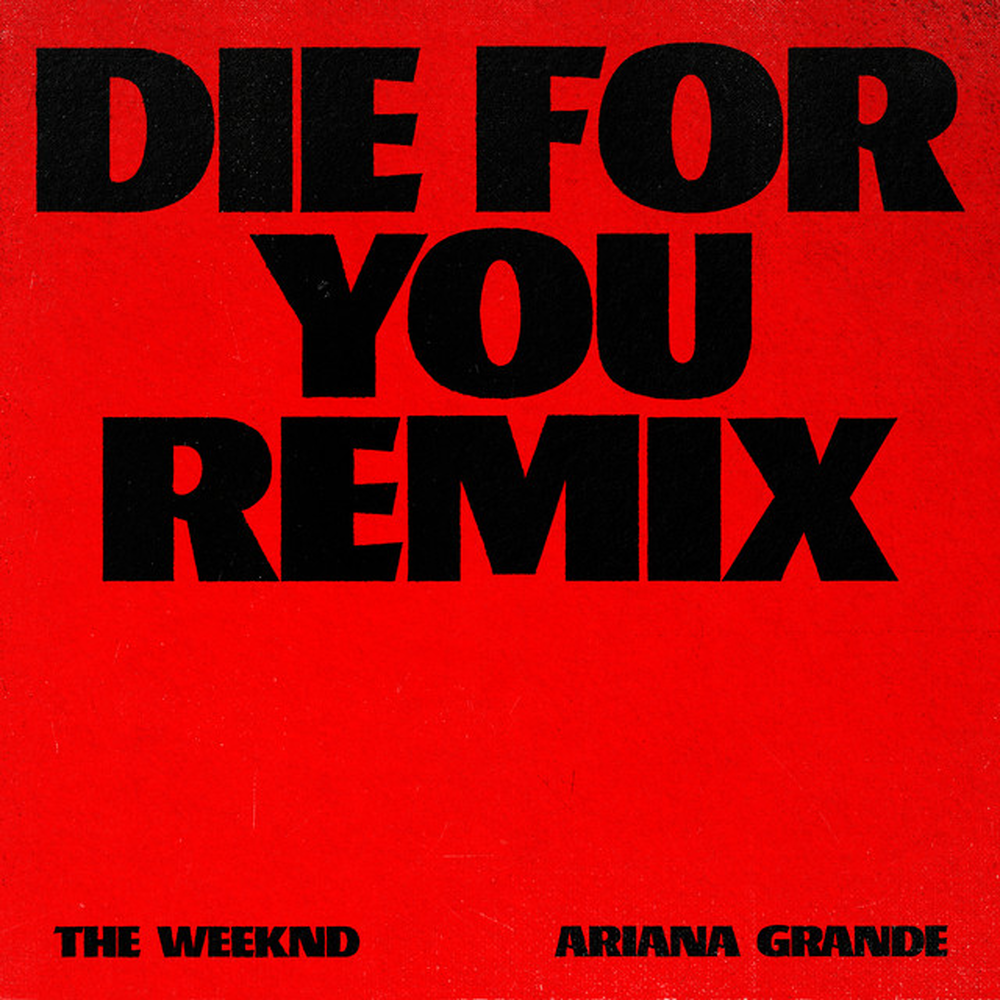

Single by the Weeknd and Ariana Grande

from the album Starboy (deluxe)
- Released: February 24, 2023
- Studio: Conway, Westlake Beverly (Los Angeles, California); Matza Ball Studio (New York, New York); The Treehouse X (Suffolk, United Kingdom)
- Genre: R&B
- Length: 3:53
- Label: XO; Republic
- Songwriters: Abel Tesfaye; Martin McKinney; Mejdi Rhars; Dylan Wiggins; Magnus Høiberg; William Thomas Walsh; Henry Walter; Ariana Grande
- Producers: Doc McKinney; Cirkut; The Weeknd; Cashmere Cat; Prince 85

The Weeknd singles chronology
"Creepin'" (2022)	"Die for You" (remix) (2023)	"Double Fantasy" (2023)

Ariana Grande singles chronology
"Santa, Can't You Hear Me" (2022)	"Die for You" (remix) (2023)	"Yes, And?" (2024)

Lyric video
- "Die for You" (remix) on YouTube

A remix of "Die for You" with American singer-songwriter Ariana Grande was released on February 24, 2023, alongside an accompanying lyric video uploaded to YouTube. On February 21, 2023, Grande shared a video on social media of her working on the remix, which was recorded whilst she was filming for the film adaptation of the musical Wicked. The song marks the fourth collaboration between the Weeknd and Grande, after "Love Me Harder" (2014), "Off the Table" (2020), and the remix of "Save Your Tears" (2021). It was later included on the deluxe edition of Starboy with its release on March 10, 2023.

The remix was a commercial success and peaked at number one on the US Billboard Hot 100. It became the seventh number-one single on the chart for both artists, and ranked as the seventh best-performing song of the year on the year-end Hot 100 chart of 2023. The remix also peaked at number one in Malaysia, the Philippines, Singapore, and Vietnam, and number two on the Billboard Global 200 and the Canadian Hot 100. According to the International Federation of the Phonographic Industry (IFPI), the remix ended the year as the fourth best-selling global single of 2023, earning 1.78 billion subscription streams equivalents globally.

=== Accolades ===
Awards and nominations for "Die for You" (Remix)
Year	Organization	Award	Result	Ref(s)
2023	Billboard Music Awards	Top Billboard Global 200 Song	Nominated	
2023	Billboard Music Awards	Top Billboard Global (Excl. US) Song	Nominated	
2023	Billboard Music Awards	Top Collaboration	Nominated	
2023	Billboard Music Awards	Top R&B Song	Nominated	
2023	Billboard Music Awards	Top Radio Song	Nominated	
2024	SOCAN Music Awards	Viral Song Award	Won	

=== Commercial performance ===
Following the release of the remix with Ariana Grande, "Die for You" reached the top of the Billboard Hot 100. It became the seventh number-one hit of both the Weeknd and Grande (the latter of whom was credited on the track on the chart for the first time, as the remix drew the majority of the title's overall activity in the tracking week). It broke the record for longest climb to number one on the Hot 100 for a non-holiday song in history (over 6 years after release). Starboy became the Weeknd's third album to spawn multiple number one singles on the Hot 100, after Beauty Behind the Madness and After Hours. It also broke the record for longest wait between Hot 100 number one singles from the same album (6 years and 2 months). The Weeknd joined Michael Jackson as the only male soloists in history to have multiple number one hits on the Hot 100 from three albums. Grande surpassed Paul McCartney as the artist with the most number one duets in Hot 100 history. The remix also obtained the largest opening day streams for a remix in Spotify history with 8.9 million streams.

=== Track listing ===
Digital / streaming single

1. "Die for You" (remix; with Ariana Grande) – 3:52

Digital single

1. "Die for You" (remix instrumental; with Ariana Grande) – 4:19

Digital / streaming EP

1. "Die for You" (remix; with Ariana Grande) – 3:52
2. "Die for You" – 4:20
3. "Die for You" (instrumental) – 4:19
4. "Die for You" (sped up) – 3:43

Digital / streaming single

1. "Die for You" (remix acapella; with Ariana Grande) – 3:52

=== Charts ===
==== Weekly charts ====
Weekly chart performance for "Die for You" (Remix)
Chart (2023–2026)	Peak position
Argentina Hot 100 (Billboard)	63
Belgium (Ultratop 50 Flanders)	42
Belgium (Ultratop 50 Wallonia)	40
Bolivia (Billboard)	25
Brazil (Billboard)	25
Canada Hot 100 (Billboard)	2
Croatia (Billboard)	13
France Airplay (SNEP)	10
Global 200 (Billboard)	2
Greece International (IFPI)	3
Hong Kong (Billboard)	10
India International (IMI)	2
Indonesia (Billboard)	3
Japan Hot Overseas (Billboard Japan)	2
Latvia (LAIPA)	4
Latvia Airplay (LAIPA)	10
Lithuania (AGATA)	4
Luxembourg (Billboard)	2
Malaysia (Billboard)	1
Malaysia International (RIM)	1
Mexico (Billboard)	18
New Zealand (Recorded Music NZ)	2
Norway (VG-lista)	6
Peru (Billboard)	11
Philippines (Billboard)	1
Philippines (Philippines Hot 100)	52
Poland (Polish Streaming Top 100)	11
Romania (Billboard)	7
Singapore (RIAS)	1
South Africa (Billboard)	7
South Korea (Circle)	160
Suriname (Nationale Top 40)	27
Sweden (Sverigetopplistan)	8
Taiwan (Billboard)	13
Thailand (Billboard)	16
US Billboard Hot 100	1
US Hot R&B/Hip-Hop Songs (Billboard)	1
Vietnam (Vietnam Hot 100)	1

==== Year-end charts ====
2023 year-end chart performance for "Die for You" (Remix)
Chart (2023)	Position
Belgium (Ultratop 50 Wallonia)	89
Canada (Canadian Hot 100)	11
Global 200 (Billboard)	5
Global Singles (IFPI)	4
Netherlands (Dutch Top 40)	83
New Zealand (Recorded Music NZ)	7
Poland (Polish Streaming Top 100)	66
US Billboard Hot 100	7
US Hot R&B/Hip-Hop Songs (Billboard)	3

2024 year-end chart performance for "Die for You" (Remix)
Chart (2024)	Position
Global 200 (Billboard)	24

2025 year-end chart performance for "Die for You" (Remix)
Chart (2025)	Position
Global 200 (Billboard)	54

=== Certifications ===
Certifications for "Die for You" (Remix)
Region	Certification	Certified units/sales
New Zealand (RMNZ)	4× Platinum	120,000^{‡}
Streaming
Central America (CFC)	Platinum	7,000,000^{†}
Greece (IFPI Greece)	Gold	1,000,000^{†}
Worldwide (IFPI)	—	1,780,000,000
^{‡} Sales+streaming figures based on certification alone.^{†} Streaming-only figures based on certification alone.

=== Release history ===
Release history and formats for "Die for You" (Remix)
Region	Date	Format(s)	Version(s)	Label(s)	Ref.
Various	February 24, 2023	Digital download; streaming	Remix	XO; Republic	
Italy	Radio airplay	Digital download; streaming	Remix	Universal	
United States	February 25, 2023	Digital download	Remix instrumental	XO; Republic	
Various	February 27, 2023	Digital download; streaming	4-track EP	XO; Republic	
Various	March 2, 2023	Digital download; streaming	Remix acapella	XO; Republic	

== See also ==
- List of Billboard Global 200 top-ten singles in 2023
- List of Billboard Hot 100 number-one singles of 2023
- List of Billboard Mainstream Top 40 number-one songs of 2023
- List of number-one songs of 2023 (Malaysia)
- List of number-one songs of 2023 (Singapore)
- List of top 10 singles for 2023 in Australia
- List of UK top-ten singles in 2023
