= Libianca =

Cameroonian singer

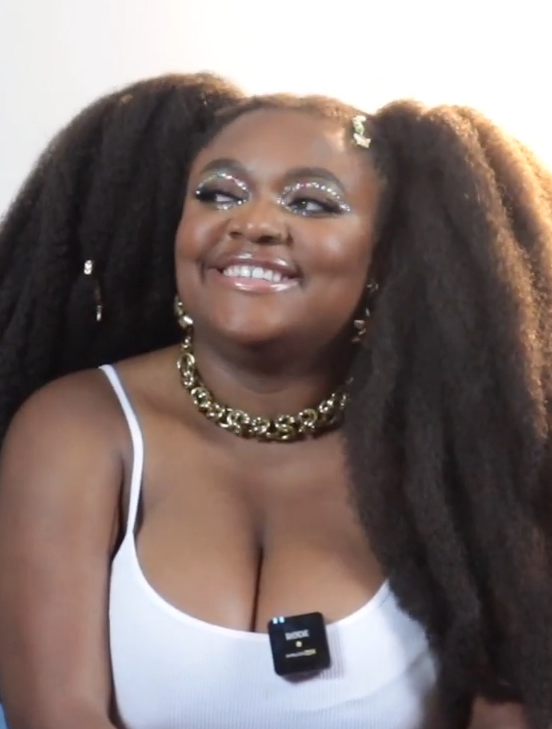
- Libianca in 2023.
- Born: Libianca Kenzonkinboum Fonji; July 23, 2000 (age 26); Minneapolis, Minnesota, U.S.
- Citizenship: Cameroon; United States
- Musical career
- Origin: Bamenda, Cameroon
- Genres: Afrobeats; R&B; afro-soul
- Occupations: Singer; songwriter
- Years active: 2019–present
- Labels: West Side Creative; 5K; RCA

Libianca Kenzonkinboum Fonji (born July 23, 2000), known mononymously as Libianca, is a Cameroonian singer. She is best known for her breakout single "People" (2022). She previously competed in the 21st season of American TV show The Voice in 2021.

== Early life ==
Libianca Kenzonkinboum Fonji was born on July 23, 2000 in Minneapolis, Minnesota. In an interview with BBC News Pidgin, Libianca recalled that when she was four years old, her family experienced issues with immigration. Her mother decided to have the family relocate to Bamenda, Cameroon, before they could be deported. In her upbringing in Bamenda, Libianca sung in gospel choirs and attended a boarding school, where she learned how to play the guitar.

=== 2021–present: The Voice and "People" ===
In 2021, Libianca competed on the twenty-first season of NBC's The Voice, where Blake Shelton was her coach. She made her way to the top 20 before being eliminated. Her covers of "Everything I Wanted" and "Woman" on the show were later released as singles via West Side Creative Agency.

Performances on The Voice season 21
Round	Theme	Song	Original Artist	Order	Original Air Date	Result
Blind Auditions	—N/a	"Good Days"	SZA	5.8	October 4, 2021	Ariana and Blake turned; Joined Team Blake
Battles (Top 48)	—N/a	"Save Your Tears" (vs. Tommy Edwards)	The Weeknd	8.2	October 12, 2021	Saved by coach
Knockouts (Top 32)	—N/a	"Everything I Wanted"	Billie Eilish	11.5	October 25, 2021	Saved by coach
Live Playoffs (Top 20)	—N/a	"Woman"	Doja Cat	15.17	November 8, 2021	Eliminated

Libianca signed to 5K Records and Sony in 2022. In December of that year, she released "People", a song inspired by her cyclothymia. The song debuted at No. 2 on the US Billboard Afrobeats chart, at No. 1 in UK Afrobeats chart, peaked at No. 2 in UK Official chart, and received wide attention across social media.

Libianca performed as an opening at Alicia Keys' 2023 Keys to the Summer Tour.

In April 2024, Libianca announced that she was postponing her North American tour following death threats for performing with a Cameroonian flag issued by separatists fighting in the Anglophone Crisis. The separatists consider the Cameroonian flag brandished by the singer as a sign of support for President Paul Biya, one of Africa's longest-serving leaders and dictators.

== Artistry ==
Libianca takes influence from genres prevalent in her upbringing, such as Cameroonian music, Nigerian music, and highlife. She describes her music as an "intersection of R&B, Afrobeats, [and] soul". Her songwriting has been praised by publications such as Complex UK for its honesty.

== Discography ==
=== Extended plays ===
List of EPs, with selected details
Title	Details
Walk Away	Released: December 8, 2023; Format: Digital; Label: 5K Records, Sony

=== Singles ===
List of singles and selected peak chart positions
Title	Year	Peak chart positions										Certifications
Title	Year	AUS	CAN	FRA	NLD	NZ	SWE	SWI	UK	US	WW	Certifications
"Level"	2019	—	—	—	—	—	—	—	—	—	—	
"My Place"	2020	—	—	—	—	—	—	—	—	—	—	
"Revenge"	2020	—	—	—	—	—	—	—	—	—	—	
"Thank You"	2021	—	—	—	—	—	—	—	—	—	—	
"Special Lovin'"	2021	—	—	—	—	—	—	—	—	—	—	
"People"	2022	22	39	19	1	2	16	9	2	80	20	ARIA: Platinum; BPI: 2× Platinum; IFPI SWI: 2× Platinum; MC: Platinum; NVPI: 2× Platinum; RIAA: Platinum; RMNZ: 4× Platinum; SNEP: Diamond
"Jah"	2023	—	—	—	—	—	—	—	—	—	—	
"Let Me Be in Your Arms" (with Sonny Fodera)	2026	—	—	—	—	—	—	—	64	—	—	

=== Other charted songs ===
List of other charted songs and selected peak chart positions
Title	Year	Peak chart positions	Album
Title	Year	NZ Hot	Album
"Mistaken" (with Oxlade and Chlöe)	2024	16	Walk Away

== Awards ==
=== Africa Entertainment Awards USA ===
Year	Nominee / work	Award	Result	Ref.
2023	Herself	Best Francophone Female Artist/Group	Nominated	
2023	Herself	Best Female Artist	Nominated	
2023	"People"	Song of the Year	Nominated	

=== The Future Awards Africa ===
Year	Nominee / work	Award	Result	Ref.
2023	Herself	Prize for Music	Nominated	

=== MTV Video Music Awards ===
Year	Nominee / work	Award	Result	Ref.
2023	People	Best Afrobeats	Nominated	
