= People (Libianca song) =

2022 single by Libianca

Single by Libianca

from the EP Walk Away
- Released: December 5, 2022
- Genre: Afrobeats
- Length: 3:04
- Label: 5K; Sony
- Songwriters: Libianca Kenzonkinboum Fonji; Orhue Moses Odia
- Producer: Mage the Producer

Libianca singles chronology
"Special Lovin" (2021)	"People" (2022)	"Jah" (2023)

"People" is a song by Cameroonian-American singer Libianca, released on December 5, 2022. The lyrics of the song are inspired by Libianca's personal experience with depression. The song has had particular success in the UK, Ireland, and New Zealand, where it reached number two, and in the Netherlands and Suriname, where it topped the chart. It has also peaked within the top five in Denmark, Lebanon, South Africa and India.

A large number of remixes of the song were released featuring different artists. Some of them were released under the title "People (Check On Me)".

== Description ==
The song deals with topics such as drinking alcohol, interpersonal relationships, emotional wellbeing, and group dynamics. It includes Cameroonian slang and reflects some of the culture.

== Music video ==
The sparse music video, directed by NYC artist Ceojay, depicts a depressed Libianca alone in her apartment, forcing herself to get out of bed. She prepares pizza and snacks for expected guests, only for all of them to text that they cannot make it.

== Track listings ==
Digital download, streaming
No.	Title	Length
1.	"People"	3:04

Digital download, streaming
No.	Title	Length
1.	"People – Sped Up"	2:37

Digital download, streaming
No.	Title	Length
1.	"People" (featuring Ayra Starr and Omah Lay)	3:04

Digital download, streaming
No.	Title	Length
1.	"People" (featuring Cian Ducrot)	3:04

Digital download, streaming
No.	Title	Length
1.	"People" (featuring Becky G)	3:22

== Charts ==
=== Weekly charts ===
Weekly chart performance for "People"
Chart (2022–2023)	Peak position
Australia (ARIA)	22
Austria (Ö3 Austria Top 40)	39
Belgium (Ultratop 50 Flanders)	5
Belgium (Ultratop 50 Wallonia)	9
Canada (Canadian Hot 100)	39
Croatia International Airplay (Top lista)	17
Denmark (Tracklisten)	4
France (SNEP)	19
Germany (GfK)	35
Global 200 (Billboard)	20
Greece International (IFPI)	30
Hungary (Single Top 40)	21
India International (IMI)	3
Indonesia (Billboard)	24
Ireland (IRMA)	2
Lebanon (Lebanese Top 20)	2
Malaysia (Billboard)	20
Malaysia International (RIM)	10
Middle East and North Africa (IFPI)	6
Netherlands (Dutch Top 40)	1
Netherlands (Single Top 100)	1
New Zealand (Recorded Music NZ)	2
Nigeria Top 100 Songs (TurnTable)	12
Nigeria Top Afro-R&B Songs (TurnTable)	1
Norway (VG-lista)	16
Poland (Polish Airplay Top 100)	7
Portugal (AFP)	41
Singapore (RIAS)	20
South Africa (Billboard)	3
Suriname (Nationale Top 40)	1
Sweden (Sverigetopplistan)	16
Switzerland (Schweizer Hitparade)	9
United Arab Emirates (IFPI)	19
UK Singles (Official Charts)	2
UK Afrobeats (Official Charts)	1
UK Hip Hop/R&B (Official Charts)	1
US Billboard Hot 100	80
US Afrobeats Songs (Billboard)	2
US Rhythmic (Billboard)	25
US World Digital Song Sales (Billboard)	2
Vietnam (Vietnam Hot 100)	23

=== Year-end charts ===
Year-end chart performance for "People"
Chart (2023)	Position
Australia (ARIA)	60
Belgium (Ultratop 50 Flanders)	15
Belgium (Ultratop 50 Wallonia)	21
Canada (Canadian Hot 100)	76
Denmark (Tracklisten)	20
Global 200 (Billboard)	51
Netherlands (Dutch Top 40)	7
Netherlands (Single Top 100)	1
New Zealand (Recorded Music NZ)	3
Poland (Polish Airplay Top 100)	92
Sweden (Sverigetopplistan)	41
Switzerland (Schweizer Hitparade)	14
UK Singles (OCC)	10
US Afrobeats Songs (Billboard)	2

== Certifications ==
Certifications and sales for "People"
Region	Certification	Certified units/sales
Australia (ARIA)	Platinum	70,000^{‡}
Austria (IFPI Austria)	Gold	15,000^{‡}
Belgium (BRMA)	Platinum	40,000^{‡}
Canada (Music Canada)	Platinum	80,000^{‡}
Denmark (IFPI Danmark)	Platinum	90,000^{‡}
France (SNEP)	Diamond	333,333^{‡}
Netherlands (NVPI)	2× Platinum	160,000^{‡}
New Zealand (RMNZ)	4× Platinum	120,000^{‡}
Nigeria (TCSN) Remix featuring Omah Lay & Ayra Starr	Gold	50,000^{‡}
Poland (ZPAV)	Platinum	50,000^{‡}
Portugal (AFP)	Platinum	10,000^{‡}
Spain (Promusicae)	Gold	30,000^{‡}
Switzerland (IFPI Switzerland)	2× Platinum	40,000^{‡}
United Kingdom (BPI)	2× Platinum	1,200,000^{‡}
United States (RIAA)	Platinum	1,000,000^{‡}
^{‡} Sales+streaming figures based on certification alone.
