= Creepin' (Metro Boomin, the Weeknd and 21 Savage song) =

2022 single by Metro Boomin, the Weeknd and 21 Savage

- Remix cover

Single by Metro Boomin, the Weeknd and 21 Savage

from the album Heroes & Villains
- Released: January 27, 2023
- Genre: R&B; pop; hip hop
- Length: 3:42
- Label: Republic; Boominati
- Songwriters: Leland Wayne; Shéyaa Abraham-Joseph; Abel Tesfaye; Jason Quenneville; Peter Lee Johnson; Johan Lenox; Mario Winans; Lauryn Hill; Nelust Jean; Prazakrel Michel; William Hart; Thomas Bell; Eithne Ní Bhraonáin; Erick Sermon; Parrish Smith; Chauncey Hawkins; Michael Carlos Jones; Nicky Ryan; Roma Ryan; Sean Combs; Jacques Webster II
- Producers: Metro Boomin; DaHeala; Peter Lee Johnson; Johan Lenox

Metro Boomin singles chronology
"Striker #1 Remix" (2021)	"Creepin'" (2023)	"Calling" (2023)

The Weeknd singles chronology
"Nothing Is Lost (You Give Me Strength)" (2022)	"Creepin'" (2022)	"Die for You" (remix) (2022)

21 Savage singles chronology
"Slime-U-Out" (2022)	"Creepin'" (2023)	"Spin Bout U" (2023)

Diddy singles chronology
"Sex in the Porsche" (2022)	"Creepin'" (remix) (2023)	"Act Bad" (2023)

Music video
- "Creepin'" (Remix) on YouTube

"Creepin'" is a song by American record producer Metro Boomin, Canadian singer the Weeknd, and British-American rapper 21 Savage. It was sent to Italian contemporary hit radio through Republic Records and Boominati Worldwide as the lead and only single from Metro's second studio album, Heroes & Villains (2022), on January 27, 2023. It is a remake of "I Don't Wanna Know" (2004) by Mario Winans featuring Enya and P. Diddy, which is based on a sample of the Fugees' song "Ready or Not" (1996), and itself samples Enya's "Boadicea" (1987). Winans himself returned to contribute to the song as a backing vocalist along with Travis Scott. Diddy himself would also join the artists on a remix of the song on March 17, 2023.

== Background and composition ==
The Weeknd and Mario Winans had previously collaborated on the title track of the former's fourth studio album, After Hours (2020), which Winans co-wrote and co-produced. The Weeknd gave a shoutout to Winans on Instagram after the release of "Creepin'" and Winans also congratulated Metro on the release of its parent album, Heroes & Villains. Upon release, the track instantly proved to be the most commercially-successful track on the album. The song is written in the key of C-sharp minor with a tempo of 98 beats per minute.

== Music video ==
A music video for the remix of "Creepin'" was released along with it on March 17, 2023. It stars all four artists and actress Coco Jones.

== Critical reception ==
Brady Brickner-Wood of Pitchfork pointed out the track as a prime example for Metro's ability to think outside the box "without sacrificing the foundation of what makes his music so appealing in the first place". Jason Lipshutz at Billboard called the song a standout track on the album due to Metro engaging "in some rollicking genre exercises" and "joyfully" re-creating "I Don't Wanna Know".

== Track listing ==
Digital and streaming single

1. "Creepin'" (Remix) (featuring 21 Savage) – 3:52

Digital and streaming single and CD

1. "Creepin'" (Remix) (featuring 21 Savage) – 3:52
2. "Creepin'" (performed by Metro Boomin, the Weeknd, and 21 Savage) – 3:41
3. "Creepin'" (Instrumental) (performed by Metro Boomin) – 3:41
4. "Creepin'" (Remix) (featuring 21 Savage) (music video) – 4:20 [digital only]

== Charts ==
=== Weekly charts ===
Weekly chart performance for "Creepin'"
Chart (2022–2024)	Peak position
Australia (ARIA)	7
Austria (Ö3 Austria Top 40)	13
Belarus Airplay (TopHit)	4
Belgium (Ultratop 50 Flanders)	13
Belgium (Ultratop 50 Wallonia)	2
Canada Hot 100 (Billboard)	1
Canada CHR/Top 40 (Billboard)	2
Canada Hot AC (Billboard)	9
CIS Airplay (TopHit)	2
Croatia (Billboard)	14
Czech Republic Singles Digital (ČNS IFPI)	7
Denmark (Tracklisten)	3
Estonia Airplay (TopHit)	14
Finland (Suomen virallinen lista)	14
France (SNEP)	8
Germany (GfK)	10
Global 200 (Billboard)	3
Greece International (IFPI)	1
Hungary (Single Top 40)	10
Hungary (Stream Top 40)	11
Iceland (Tónlistinn)	2
Ireland (IRMA)	8
Italy (FIMI)	37
Kazakhstan Airplay (TopHit)	2
Latvia (LaIPA)	2
Latvia Airplay (LaIPA)	3
Lebanon Airplay (Lebanese Top 20)	2
Luxembourg (Billboard)	3
Lithuania (AGATA)	1
Lithuania Airplay (TopHit)	2
Malaysia (Billboard)	1
Malaysia International (RIM)	1
MENA (IFPI)	2
Netherlands (Dutch Top 40)	2
Netherlands (Single Top 100)	7
New Zealand (Recorded Music NZ)	6
Nigeria (TurnTable Top 100)	72
Norway (VG-lista)	7
Philippines (Billboard)	17
Poland (Polish Airplay Top 100)	2
Poland (Polish Streaming Top 100)	25
Portugal (AFP)	4
Romania (Billboard)	2
Romania Airplay (TopHit)	32
Russia Airplay (TopHit)	2
Singapore (RIAS)	1
Slovakia Airplay (ČNS IFPI)	25
Slovakia Singles Digital (ČNS IFPI)	4
South Africa (Billboard)	3
Suriname (Nationale Top 40)	5
Sweden (Sverigetopplistan)	8
Switzerland (Schweizer Hitparade)	6
Turkey International Airplay (Radiomonitor Türkiye)	1
Ukraine Airplay (TopHit)	3
UK Singles (Official Charts)	7
US Billboard Hot 100	3
US Adult Contemporary (Billboard)	14
US Adult Pop Airplay (Billboard)	3
US Dance Airplay (Billboard)	8
US Hot R&B/Hip-Hop Songs (Billboard)	1
US Pop Airplay (Billboard)	2
US R&B/Hip-Hop Airplay (Billboard)	5
US Rhythmic Airplay (Billboard)	1
Vietnam (Vietnam Hot 100)	27

=== Monthly charts ===
2023 monthly chart performance for "Creepin'"
Chart (2023)	Peak position
Belarus Airplay (TopHit)	4
CIS Airplay (TopHit)	2
Czech Republic (Singles Digitál – Top 100)	20
Estonia Airplay (TopHit)	23
Kazakhstan Airplay (TopHit)	2
Lithuania Airplay (TopHit)	2
Romania Airplay (TopHit)	39
Russia Airplay (TopHit)	3
Slovakia (Rádio – Top 100)	30
Slovakia (Singles Digitál – Top 100)	5
Ukraine Airplay (TopHit)	4

2026 monthly chart performance
Chart (2026)	Peak position
Belarus Airplay (TopHit)	78

=== Year-end charts ===
2023 year-end chart performance for "Creepin'"
Chart (2023)	Position
Australia (ARIA)	16
Austria (Ö3 Austria Top 40)	52
Belarus Airplay (TopHit)	9
Belgium (Ultratop 50 Flanders)	26
Belgium (Ultratop 50 Wallonia)	4
Canada (Canadian Hot 100)	8
CIS Airplay (TopHit)	3
Denmark (Tracklisten)	27
Estonia Airplay (TopHit)	56
Germany (Official German Charts)	23
Global 200 (Billboard)	9
Global Singles (IFPI)	12
Italy (FIMI)	88
Kazakhstan Airplay (TopHit)	4
Lithuania Airplay (TopHit)	7
Netherlands (Dutch Top 40)	17
Netherlands (Single Top 100)	14
New Zealand (Recorded Music NZ)	24
Poland (Polish Airplay Top 100)	6
Poland (Polish Streaming Top 100)	61
Romania Airplay (TopHit)	102
Russia Airplay (TopHit)	4
Sweden (Sverigetopplistan)	48
Switzerland (Schweizer Hitparade)	13
Ukraine Airplay (TopHit)	8
UK Singles (OCC)	23
Ukraine Airplay (TopHit)	10
US Billboard Hot 100	5
US Adult Contemporary (Billboard)	28
US Adult Top 40 (Billboard)	12
US Hot R&B/Hip-Hop Songs (Billboard)	2
US Mainstream Top 40 (Billboard)	3
US Rhythmic (Billboard)	2

2024 year-end chart performance for "Creepin'"
Chart (2024)	Position
Belarus Airplay (TopHit)	120
CIS Airplay (TopHit)	101

2025 year-end chart performance for "Creepin'"
Chart (2025)	Position
Belarus Airplay (TopHit)	107
CIS Airplay (TopHit)	197

== Certifications ==
Certifications for "Creepin'"
Region	Certification	Certified units/sales
Australia (ARIA)	4× Platinum	280,000^{‡}
Belgium (BRMA)	Platinum	40,000^{‡}
Brazil (Pro-Música Brasil)	Gold	20,000^{‡}
Canada (Music Canada)	4× Platinum	320,000^{‡}
Denmark (IFPI Danmark)	Platinum	90,000^{‡}
France (SNEP)	Diamond	333,333^{‡}
Germany (BVMI)	Gold	200,000^{‡}
Italy (FIMI)	2× Platinum	200,000^{‡}
New Zealand (RMNZ)	3× Platinum	90,000^{‡}
Poland (ZPAV)	2× Platinum	100,000^{‡}
Portugal (AFP)	3× Platinum	30,000^{‡}
Spain (Promusicae)	Platinum	60,000^{‡}
Switzerland (IFPI Switzerland)	Platinum	20,000^{‡}
United Kingdom (BPI)	Platinum	600,000^{‡}
United States (RIAA)	4× Platinum	4,000,000^{‡}
Streaming
Central America (CFC)	Platinum	7,000,000^{†}
Greece (IFPI Greece)	4× Platinum	8,000,000^{†}
Worldwide (IFPI)	—	1,200,000,000
^{‡} Sales+streaming figures based on certification alone.^{†} Streaming-only figures based on certification alone.

== Release history ==
Release history and formats for "Creepin'"
Country	Date	Format	Version(s)	Label	Ref.
Italy	January 27, 2023	Radio airplay	Original	Universal Music Italy	
Various	March 17, 2023	Digital download; streaming	Remix	Boominati; Republic	
United States	March 20, 2023	CD single	Remix	Boominati; Republic	
