= List of Billboard number-one adult contemporary hits =

The links on this page contain lists of songs that have reached number-one on the Billboard adult contemporary chart. This chart was first printed in Billboard magazine in 1961 and lists the most popular songs as determined by airplay on American adult contemporary music radio stations. Over the years, the chart has gone by a variety of names, including Easy Listening, Middle-Road Singles, Pop-Standard Singles, Adult Contemporary and Hot Adult Contemporary, and it is currently referred to as the Adult Contemporary chart.

== 1960s ==
- 1961
- 1962
- 1963
- 1964
- 1965
- 1966
- 1967
- 1968
- 1969

== 1970s ==
- 1970
- 1971
- 1972
- 1973
- 1974
- 1975
- 1976
- 1977
- 1978
- 1979

== 1980s ==
- 1980
- 1981
- 1982
- 1983
- 1984
- 1985
- 1986
- 1987
- 1988
- 1989

== 1990s ==
- 1990
- 1991
- 1992
- 1993
- 1994
- 1995
- 1996
- 1997
- 1998
- 1999

== 2000s ==
- 2000
- 2001
- 2002
- 2003
- 2004
- 2005
- 2006
- 2007
- 2008
- 2009

== 2010s ==
- 2010
- 2011
- 2012
- 2013
- 2014
- 2015
- 2016
- 2017
- 2018
- 2019

== 2020s ==
- 2020
- 2021
- 2022
- 2023
- 2024
- 2025
- 2026

== See also ==
- List of artists who reached number one on the U.S. Adult Contemporary chart
