= List of Billboard Adult Contemporary number ones of 2026 =

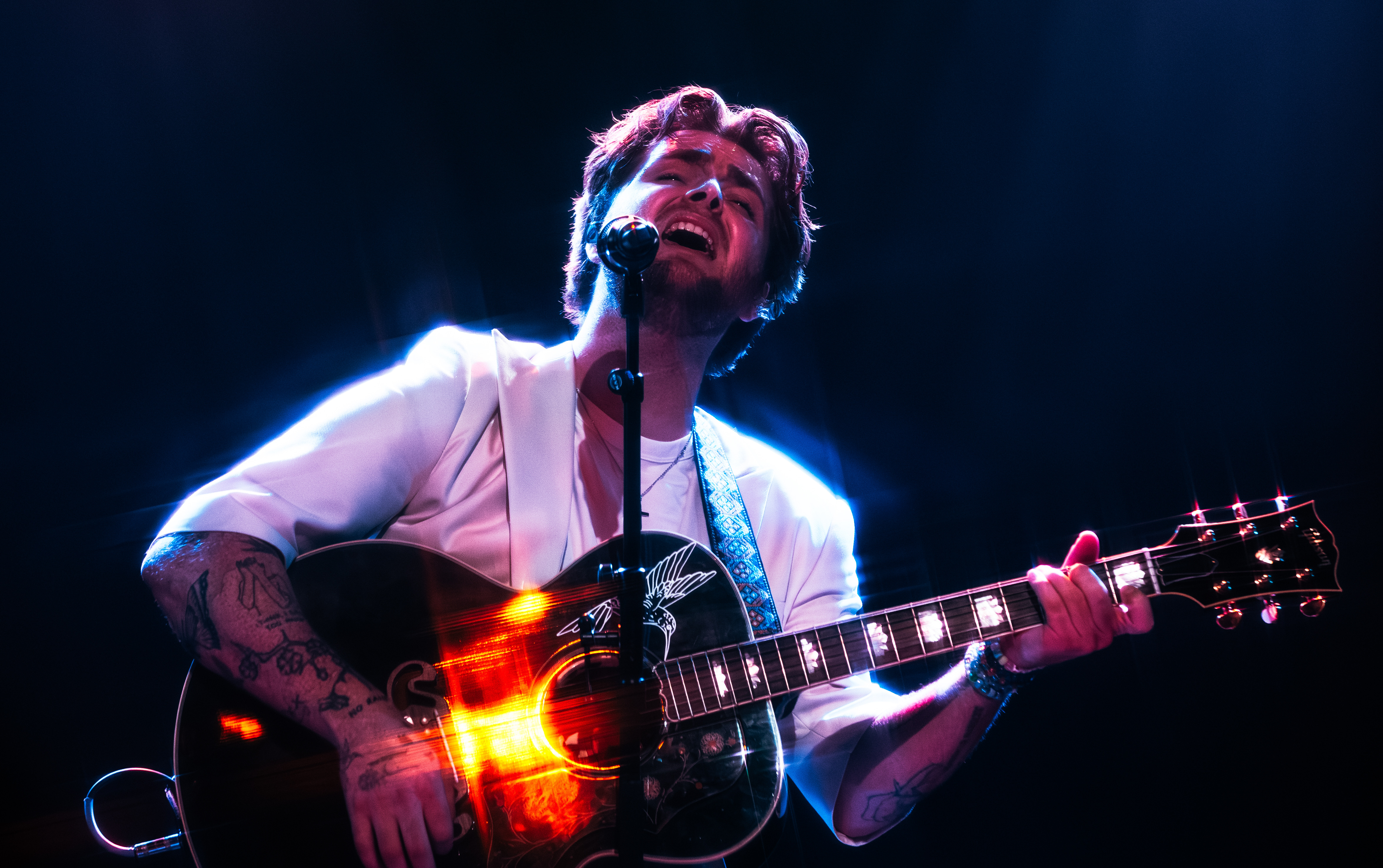
As of the chart dated November 21, Alex Warren has spent 46 consecutive weeks at number one with "Ordinary", in addition to 9 weeks in 2025.

Adult Contemporary is a chart published by Billboard ranking the top-performing songs in the United States in the adult contemporary music (AC) market, based on weekly airplay data from radio stations compiled by Luminate.

== Chart history ==
| Issue date | Title | Artist(s) | Ref. |
|---|---|---|---|
| January 3 | "I've Got My Love to Keep Me Warm" | Pentatonix and Frank Sinatra | |
| January 10 | "Ordinary" | Alex Warren | |
| January 17 | "Ordinary" | Alex Warren | |
| January 24 | "Ordinary" | Alex Warren | |
| January 31 | "Ordinary" | Alex Warren | |
| February 7 | "Ordinary" | Alex Warren | |
| February 14 | "Ordinary" | Alex Warren | |
| February 21 | "Ordinary" | Alex Warren | |
| February 28 | "Ordinary" | Alex Warren | |
| March 7 | "Ordinary" | Alex Warren | |
| March 14 | "Ordinary" | Alex Warren | |
| March 21 | "Ordinary" | Alex Warren | |
| March 28 | "Ordinary" | Alex Warren | |
| April 4 | "Ordinary" | Alex Warren | |
| April 11 | "Ordinary" | Alex Warren | |
| April 18 | "Ordinary" | Alex Warren | |
| April 25 | "Ordinary" | Alex Warren | |
| May 2 | "Ordinary" | Alex Warren | |
| May 9 | "Ordinary" | Alex Warren | |
| May 16 | "Ordinary" | Alex Warren | |
| May 23 | "Ordinary" | Alex Warren | |
| May 30 | "Ordinary" | Alex Warren | |
| June 6 | "Ordinary" | Alex Warren | |
| June 13 | "Ordinary" | Alex Warren | |
| June 20 | "Ordinary" | Alex Warren | |
| June 27 | "Ordinary" | Alex Warren | |
| July 4 | "Ordinary" | Alex Warren | |
| July 11 | "Ordinary" | Alex Warren | |
| July 18 | "Ordinary" | Alex Warren | |
| July 25 | "Ordinary" | Alex Warren | |
| August 1 | "Ordinary" | Alex Warren | |
| August 8 | "Ordinary" | Alex Warren | |
| August 15 | "Ordinary" | Alex Warren | |
| August 22 | "Ordinary" | Alex Warren | |
| August 29 | "Ordinary" | Alex Warren | |
| September 5 | "Ordinary" | Alex Warren | |
| September 12 | "Ordinary" | Alex Warren | |
| September 19 | "Ordinary" | Alex Warren | |
| September 26 | "Ordinary" | Alex Warren | |
| October 3 | "Ordinary" | Alex Warren | |
| October 10 | "Ordinary" | Alex Warren | |
| October 17 | "Ordinary" | Alex Warren | |
| October 24 | "Ordinary" | Alex Warren | |
| October 31 | "Ordinary" | Alex Warren | |
| November 7 | "Ordinary" | Alex Warren | |
| November 14 | "Ordinary" | Alex Warren | |
| November 21 | "Ordinary" | Alex Warren | |
