= List of Billboard Adult Contemporary number ones of 2024 =

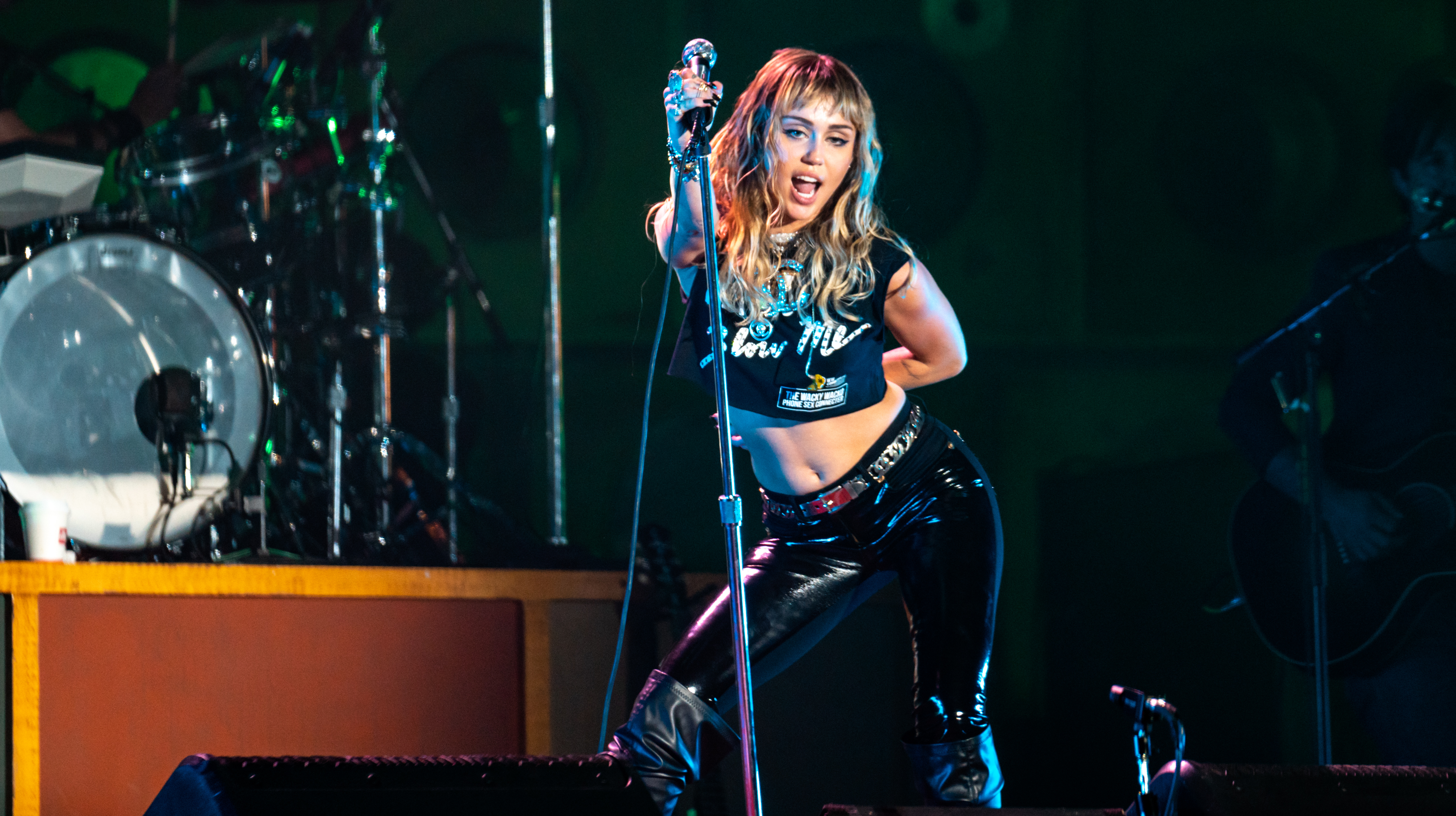
In January "Flowers" by Miley Cyrus set a new record for the most weeks at number one.

Adult Contemporary is a chart published by Billboard ranking the top-performing songs in the United States in the adult contemporary music (AC) market, based on weekly airplay data from radio stations compiled by Broadcast Data Systems.

In the issue of Billboard dated January 6, "Flowers" by Miley Cyrus moved back to number one, its 35th non-consecutive week atop the chart. Two weeks later the song broke the record for the most weeks at number one on the Adult Contemporary chart. The following week, Taylor Swift reached number one with "Cruel Summer", a song which had been available as an album track since 2019 but not promoted as a single until 2023. "Flowers" returned to number one for a single week the following week before "Cruel Summer" spent a further six weeks in the top spot. "Flowers" returned to number one in the issue dated March 23 and held the top spot for 19 consecutive weeks, meaning that it had spent the equivalent of more than a year in the top spot in total.

== Chart history ==
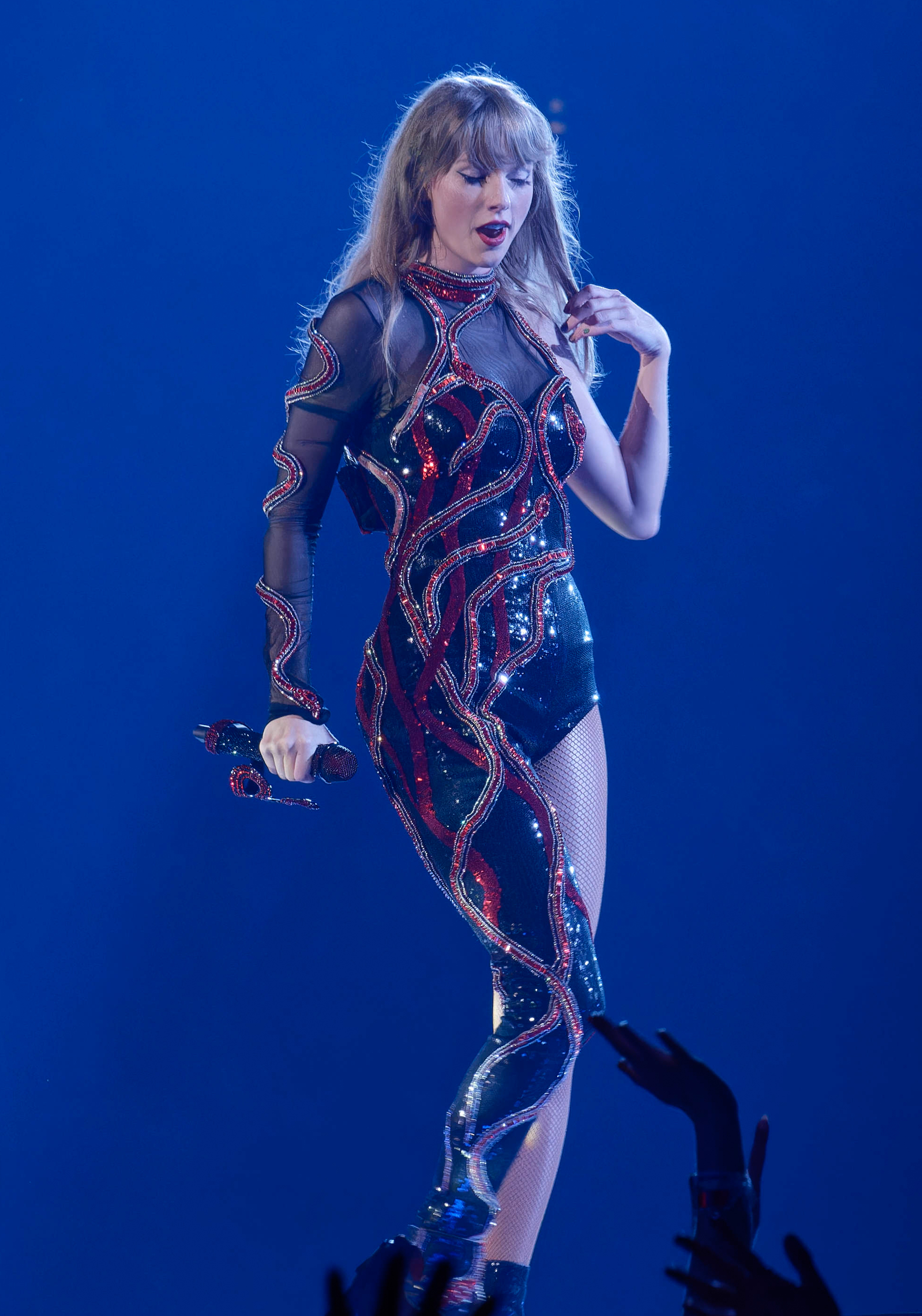
Taylor Swift topped the chart with "Cruel Summer", which had originally been released in 2019.

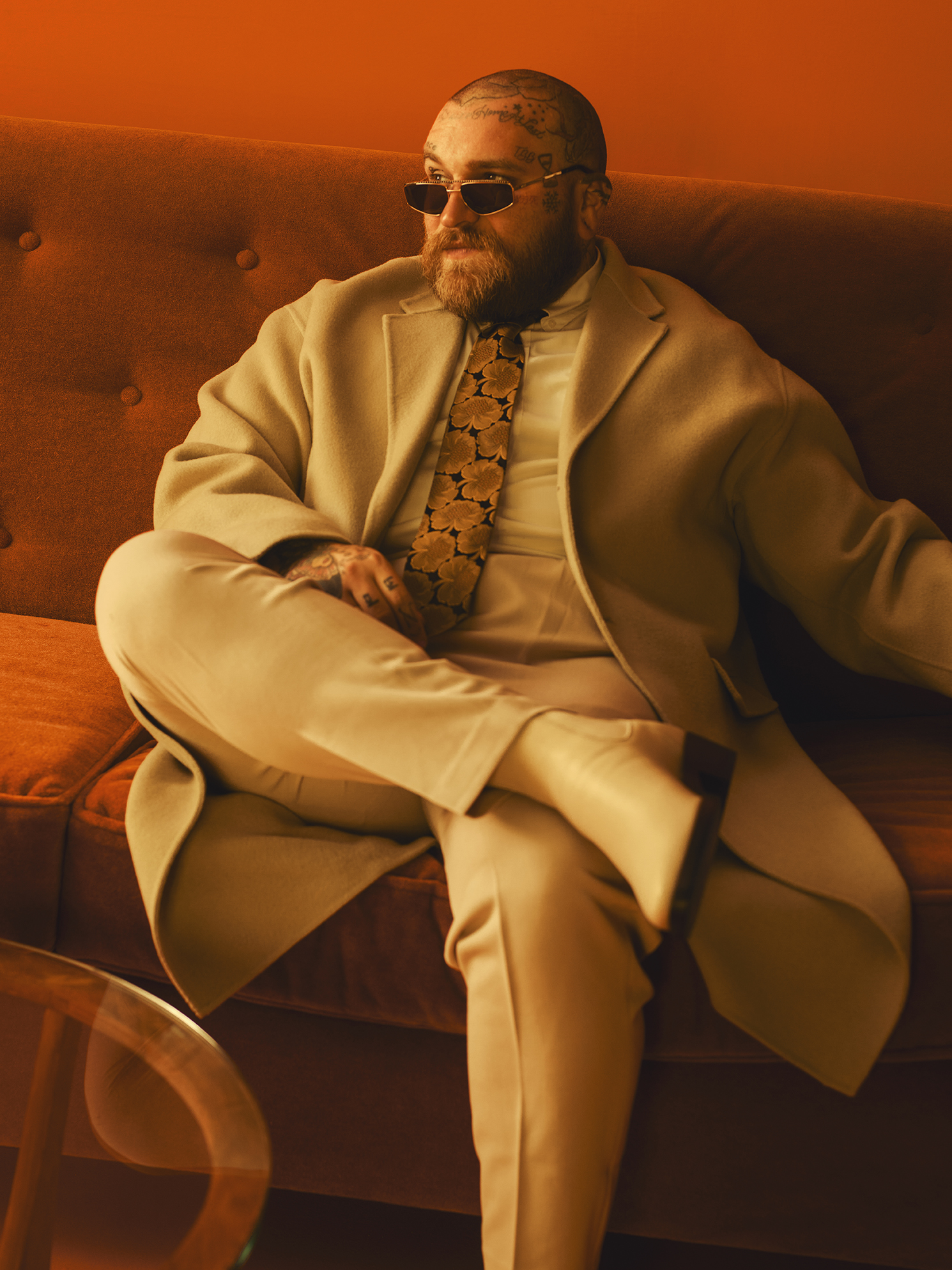
Teddy Swims reached number one in the issue of Billboard dated August 3 with "Lose Control".

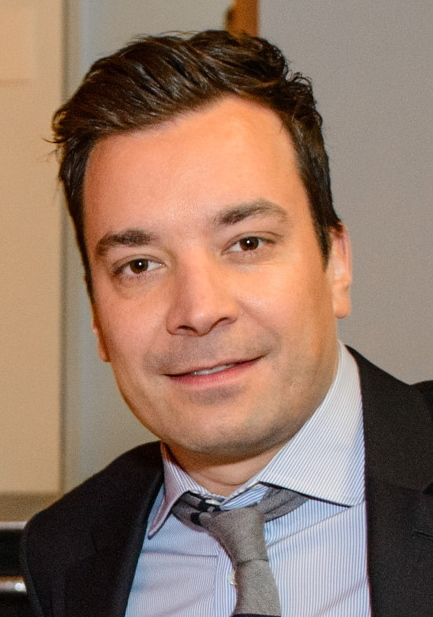
The comedian and talk show host Jimmy Fallon had the year's final AC number one.

Key
†	Indicates number one on Billboard's year end AC chart

Issue date	Title	Artist(s)	Ref.
January 6	"Flowers" †	Miley Cyrus	
January 13	"Flowers" †	Miley Cyrus	
January 20	"Flowers" †	Miley Cyrus	
January 27	"Cruel Summer"	Taylor Swift	
February 3	"Flowers" †	Miley Cyrus	
February 10	"Cruel Summer"	Taylor Swift	
February 17	"Cruel Summer"	Taylor Swift	
February 24	"Cruel Summer"	Taylor Swift	
March 2	"Cruel Summer"	Taylor Swift	
March 9	"Cruel Summer"	Taylor Swift	
March 16	"Cruel Summer"	Taylor Swift	
March 23	"Flowers" †	Miley Cyrus	
March 30	"Flowers" †	Miley Cyrus	
April 6	"Flowers" †	Miley Cyrus	
April 13	"Flowers" †	Miley Cyrus	
April 20	"Flowers" †	Miley Cyrus	
April 27	"Flowers" †	Miley Cyrus	
May 4	"Flowers" †	Miley Cyrus	
May 11	"Flowers" †	Miley Cyrus	
May 18	"Flowers" †	Miley Cyrus	
May 25	"Flowers" †	Miley Cyrus	
June 1	"Flowers" †	Miley Cyrus	
June 8	"Flowers" †	Miley Cyrus	
June 15	"Flowers" †	Miley Cyrus	
June 22	"Flowers" †	Miley Cyrus	
June 29	"Flowers" †	Miley Cyrus	
July 6	"Flowers" †	Miley Cyrus	
July 13	"Flowers" †	Miley Cyrus	
July 20	"Flowers" †	Miley Cyrus	
July 27	"Flowers" †	Miley Cyrus	
August 3	"Lose Control"	Teddy Swims	
August 10	"Lose Control"	Teddy Swims	
August 17	"Lose Control"	Teddy Swims	
August 24	"Lose Control"	Teddy Swims	
August 31	"Lose Control"	Teddy Swims	
September 7	"Lose Control"	Teddy Swims	
September 14	"Lose Control"	Teddy Swims	
September 21	"Lose Control"	Teddy Swims	
September 28	"Lose Control"	Teddy Swims	
October 5	"Lose Control"	Teddy Swims	
October 12	"Lose Control"	Teddy Swims	
October 19	"Lose Control"	Teddy Swims	
October 26	"Lose Control"	Teddy Swims	
November 2	"Lose Control"	Teddy Swims	
November 9	"Lose Control"	Teddy Swims	
November 16	"Lose Control"	Teddy Swims	
November 23	"Lose Control"	Teddy Swims	
November 30	"Lose Control"	Teddy Swims	
December 7	"Lose Control"	Teddy Swims	
December 14	"Lose Control"	Teddy Swims	
December 21	"Holiday"	Jimmy Fallon and Jonas Brothers	
December 28	"Holiday"	Jimmy Fallon and Jonas Brothers	
