= List of Billboard Adult Contemporary number ones of 2025 =

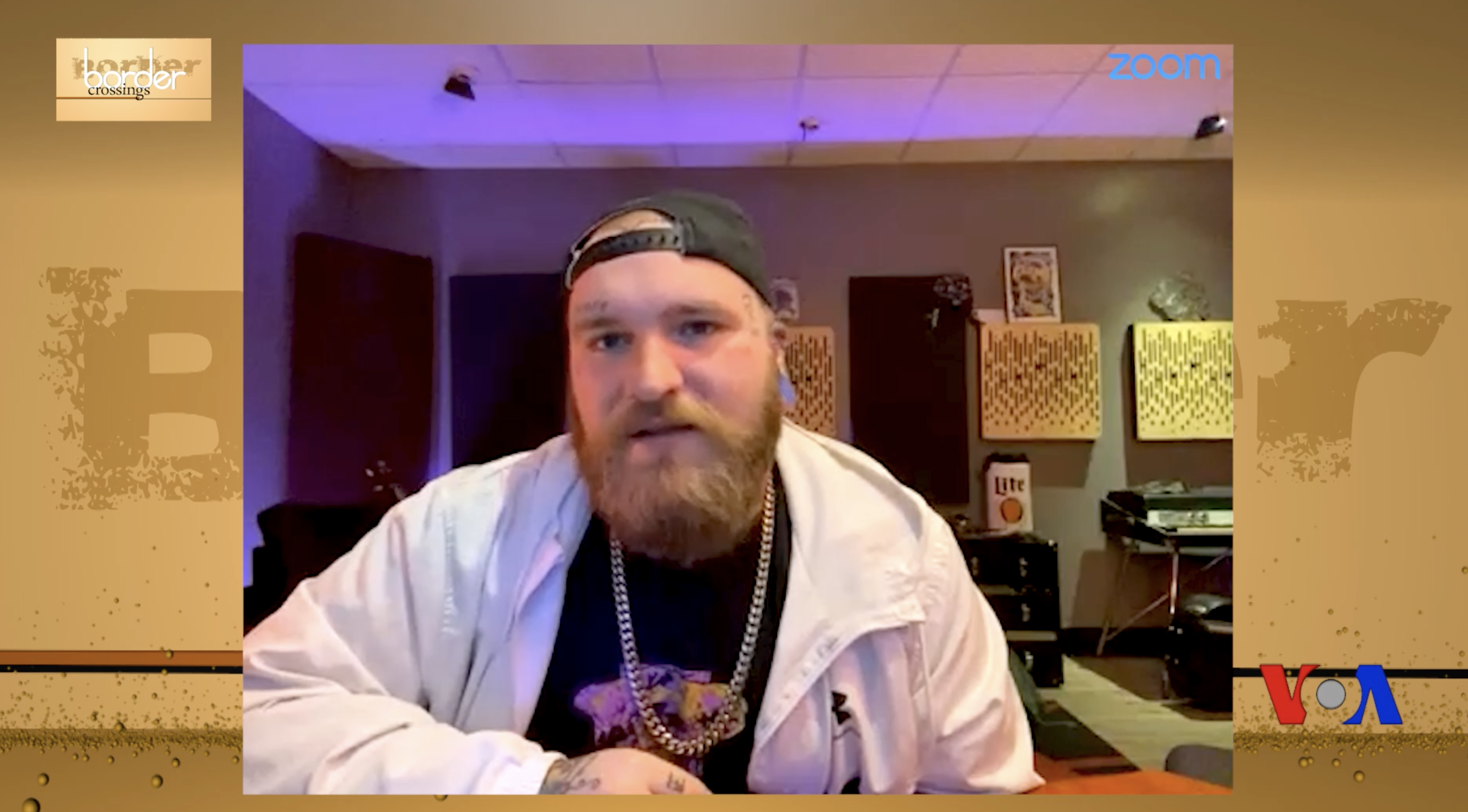
Teddy Swims spent the first 12 weeks of 2025 at number one.

Adult Contemporary is a chart published by Billboard ranking the top-performing songs in the United States in the adult contemporary music (AC) market, based on weekly airplay data from radio stations compiled by Luminate.

In the issue of Billboard dated January 4, "Lose Control" by Teddy Swims moved back up to number one, its 21st week in the top spot overall. It held the top spot for the first 12 weeks of the year before being replaced by Benson Boone's track "Beautiful Things". The songs exchanged the number-one position several times and until October were the only two songs to top the listing during 2025. In the issue dated October 25, "Ordinary" by Alex Warren became the year's third chart-topper. In December, the vocal group Pentatonix spent a week at number one with "I've Got My Love to Keep Me Warm", which featured additional vocals by Frank Sinatra. The song was the first AC number one since 1967 for Sinatra, who died in 1998. The gap of 58 years between chart-toppers was a new record for the AC chart, more than twice as long as the previous longest gap between number ones by an artist.

== Chart history ==
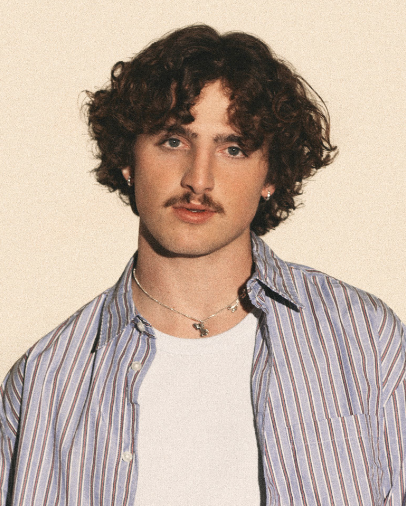
Benson Boone's song "Beautiful Things" reached number one in March.

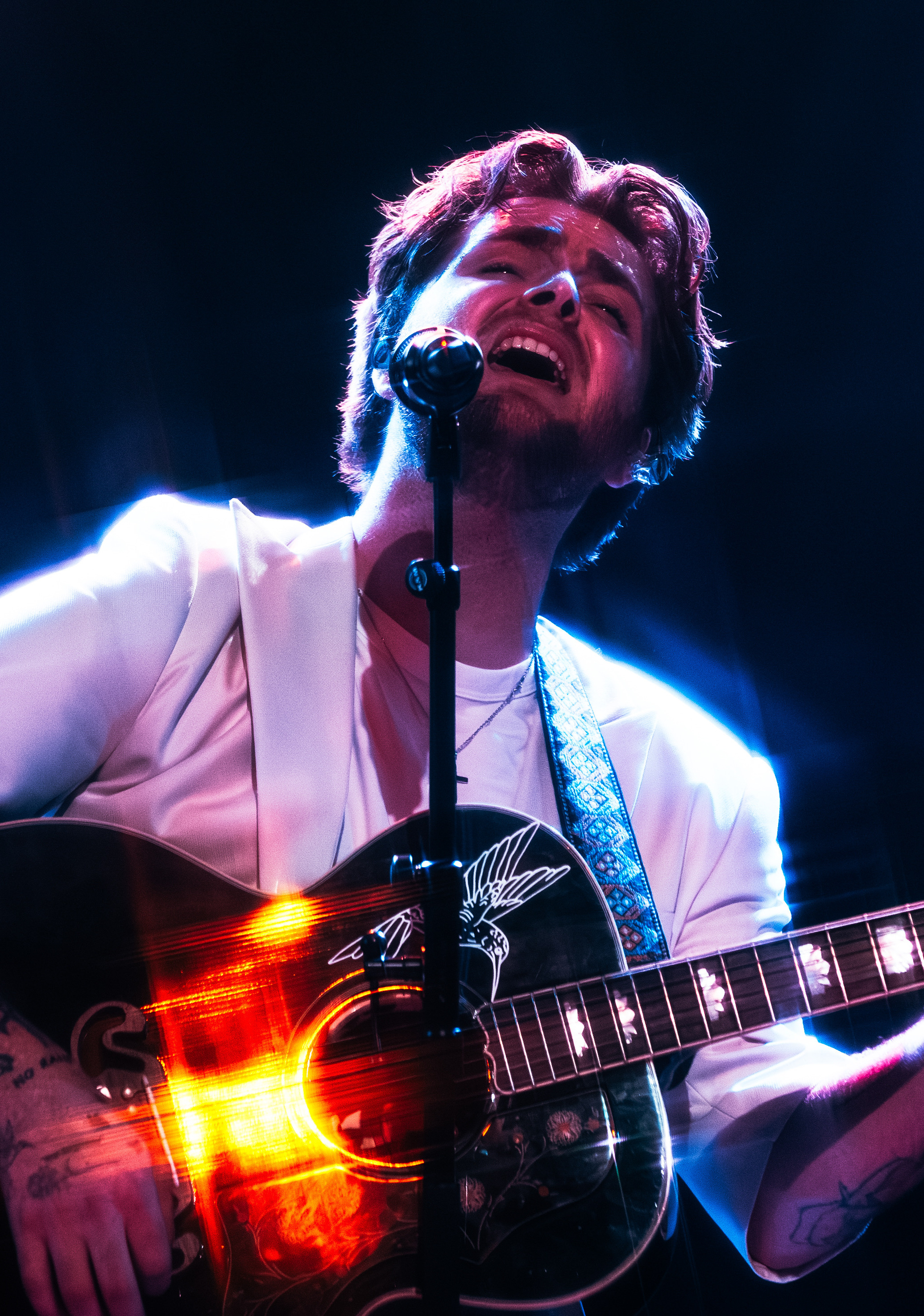
Alex Warren's song "Ordinary" topped the chart in October.

Key
†	Indicates number one on Billboard's year end AC chart

Issue date	Title	Artist(s)	Ref.
January 4	"Lose Control" †	Teddy Swims	
January 11	"Lose Control" †	Teddy Swims	
January 18	"Lose Control" †	Teddy Swims	
January 25	"Lose Control" †	Teddy Swims	
February 1	"Lose Control" †	Teddy Swims	
February 8	"Lose Control" †	Teddy Swims	
February 15	"Lose Control" †	Teddy Swims	
February 22	"Lose Control" †	Teddy Swims	
March 1	"Lose Control" †	Teddy Swims	
March 8	"Lose Control" †	Teddy Swims	
March 15	"Lose Control" †	Teddy Swims	
March 22	"Lose Control" †	Teddy Swims	
March 29	"Beautiful Things"	Benson Boone	
April 5	"Beautiful Things"	Benson Boone	
April 12	"Lose Control" †	Teddy Swims	
April 19	"Lose Control" †	Teddy Swims	
April 26	"Lose Control" †	Teddy Swims	
May 3	"Beautiful Things"	Benson Boone	
May 10	"Beautiful Things"	Benson Boone	
May 17	"Beautiful Things"	Benson Boone	
May 24	"Beautiful Things"	Benson Boone	
May 31	"Beautiful Things"	Benson Boone	
June 7	"Beautiful Things"	Benson Boone	
June 14	"Beautiful Things"	Benson Boone	
June 21	"Beautiful Things"	Benson Boone	
June 28	"Beautiful Things"	Benson Boone	
July 5	"Lose Control" †	Teddy Swims	
July 12	"Beautiful Things"	Benson Boone	
July 19	"Lose Control" †	Teddy Swims	
July 26	"Lose Control" †	Teddy Swims	
August 2	"Beautiful Things"	Benson Boone	
August 9	"Lose Control" †	Teddy Swims	
August 16	"Lose Control" †	Teddy Swims	
August 23	"Lose Control" †	Teddy Swims	
August 30	"Lose Control" †	Teddy Swims	
September 6	"Lose Control" †	Teddy Swims	
September 13	"Lose Control" †	Teddy Swims	
September 20	"Lose Control" †	Teddy Swims	
September 27	"Lose Control" †	Teddy Swims	
October 4	"Lose Control" †	Teddy Swims	
October 11	"Lose Control" †	Teddy Swims	
October 18	"Lose Control" †	Teddy Swims	
October 25	"Ordinary"	Alex Warren	
November 1	"Ordinary"	Alex Warren	
November 8	"Ordinary"	Alex Warren	
November 15	"Ordinary"	Alex Warren	
November 22	"Ordinary"	Alex Warren	
November 29	"Ordinary"	Alex Warren	
December 6	"Ordinary"	Alex Warren	
December 13	"Ordinary"	Alex Warren	
December 20	"I've Got My Love to Keep Me Warm"	Pentatonix and Frank Sinatra	
December 27	"Ordinary"	Alex Warren	
