= List of Billboard Adult Contemporary number ones of 2023 =

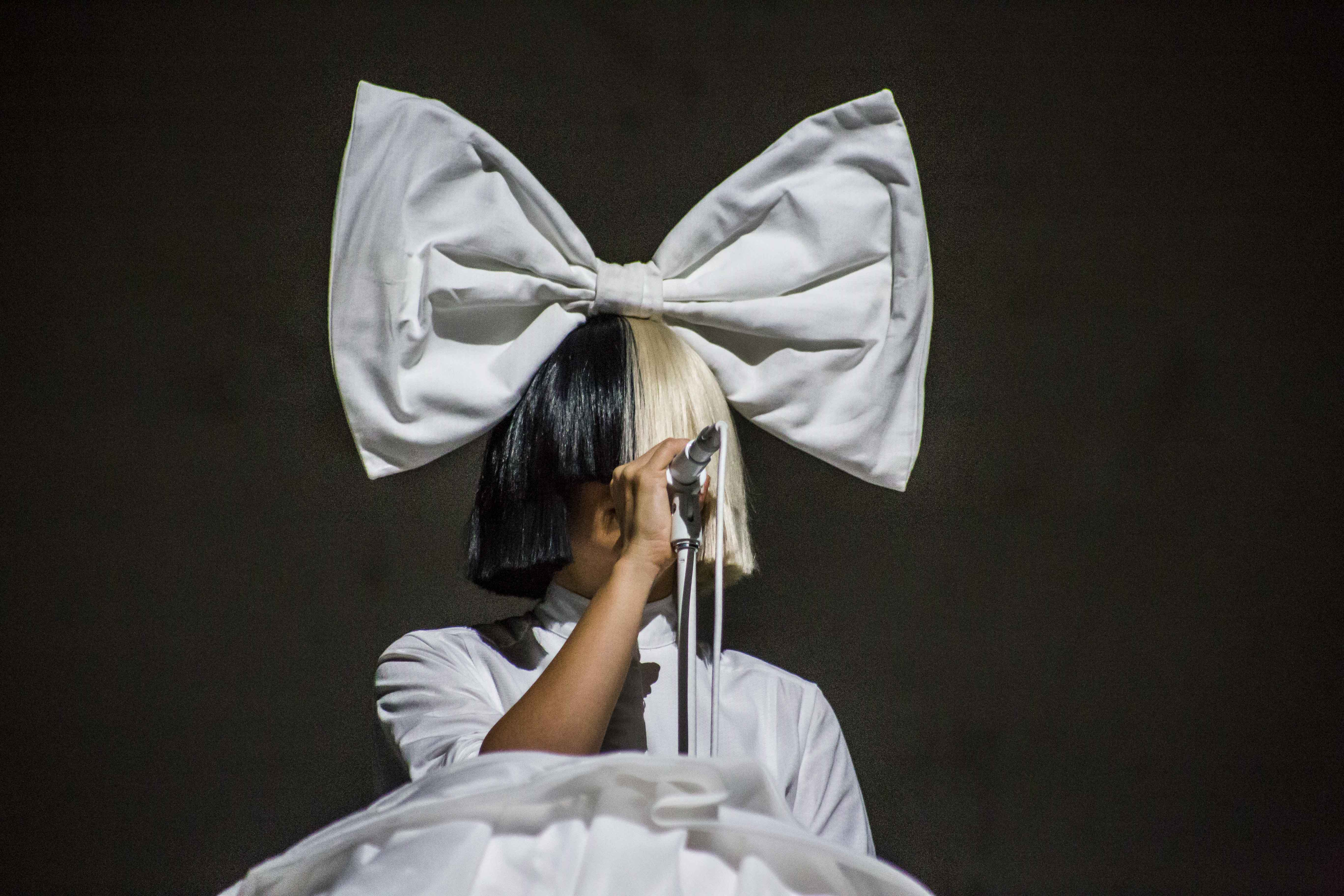
Australian singer Sia had the year's first number one.

Adult Contemporary is a chart published by Billboard ranking the top-performing songs in the United States in the adult contemporary music (AC) market, based on weekly airplay data from radio stations compiled by Broadcast Data Systems.

In the issue of Billboard dated January 7, Australian singer Sia reached number one with "Unstoppable"; the song, originally released in 2016, had experienced fresh popularity on social media sites. The song occupied the top spot for the first 11 weeks of the year before being replaced by "Anti-Hero" by Taylor Swift.

Miley Cyrus topped the chart in April with her track "Flowers", which occupied the top spot for 34 consecutive weeks. It was the singer's first AC number one since she topped the chart in 2009 at the age of 16. In December, Cher topped the chart with "DJ Play a Christmas Song", her first AC chart-topper since "If I Could Turn Back Time" in 1989.

With only four songs topping the chart in 2023, it marks the year with the fewest number ones; the previous record was 1996 with five chart-toppers.

== Chart history ==
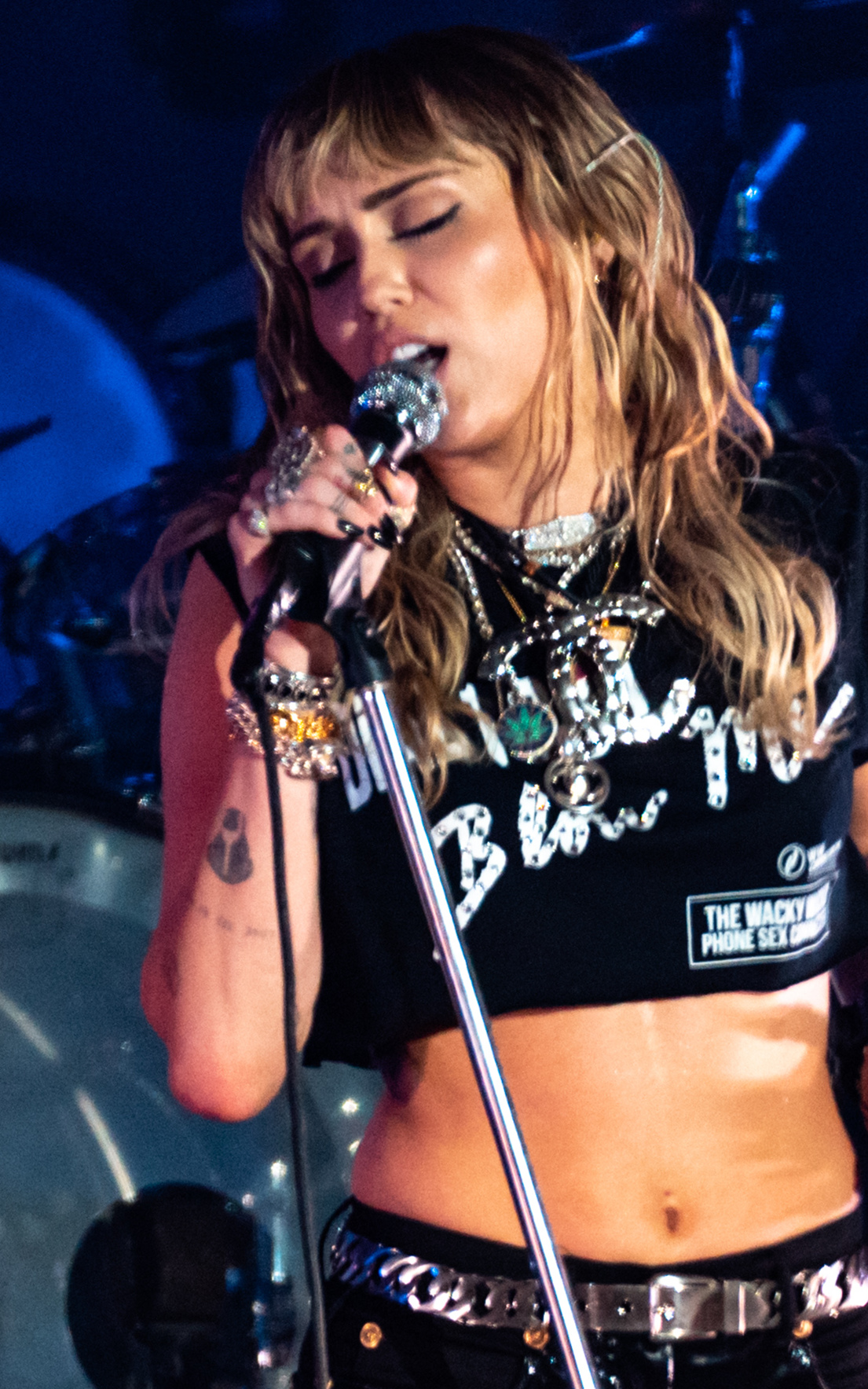
Miley Cyrus reached number one in April with "Flowers".

Key
†	Indicates number one on Billboard's year end AC chart

Issue date	Title	Artist(s)	Ref.
January 7	"Unstoppable" †	Sia	
January 14	"Unstoppable" †	Sia	
January 21	"Unstoppable" †	Sia	
January 28	"Unstoppable" †	Sia	
February 4	"Unstoppable" †	Sia	
February 11	"Unstoppable" †	Sia	
February 18	"Unstoppable" †	Sia	
February 25	"Unstoppable" †	Sia	
March 4	"Unstoppable" †	Sia	
March 11	"Unstoppable" †	Sia	
March 18	"Unstoppable" †	Sia	
March 25	"Anti-Hero"	Taylor Swift	
April 1	"Anti-Hero"	Taylor Swift	
April 8	"Anti-Hero"	Taylor Swift	
April 15	"Flowers"	Miley Cyrus	
April 22	"Flowers"	Miley Cyrus	
April 29	"Flowers"	Miley Cyrus	
May 6	"Flowers"	Miley Cyrus	
May 13	"Flowers"	Miley Cyrus	
May 20	"Flowers"	Miley Cyrus	
May 27	"Flowers"	Miley Cyrus	
June 3	"Flowers"	Miley Cyrus	
June 10	"Flowers"	Miley Cyrus	
June 17	"Flowers"	Miley Cyrus	
June 24	"Flowers"	Miley Cyrus	
July 1	"Flowers"	Miley Cyrus	
July 8	"Flowers"	Miley Cyrus	
July 15	"Flowers"	Miley Cyrus	
July 22	"Flowers"	Miley Cyrus	
July 29	"Flowers"	Miley Cyrus	
August 5	"Flowers"	Miley Cyrus	
August 12	"Flowers"	Miley Cyrus	
August 19	"Flowers"	Miley Cyrus	
August 26	"Flowers"	Miley Cyrus	
September 2	"Flowers"	Miley Cyrus	
September 9	"Flowers"	Miley Cyrus	
September 16	"Flowers"	Miley Cyrus	
September 23	"Flowers"	Miley Cyrus	
September 30	"Flowers"	Miley Cyrus	
October 7	"Flowers"	Miley Cyrus	
October 14	"Flowers"	Miley Cyrus	
October 21	"Flowers"	Miley Cyrus	
October 28	"Flowers"	Miley Cyrus	
November 4	"Flowers"	Miley Cyrus	
November 11	"Flowers"	Miley Cyrus	
November 18	"Flowers"	Miley Cyrus	
November 25	"Flowers"	Miley Cyrus	
December 2	"Flowers"	Miley Cyrus	
December 9	"DJ Play a Christmas Song"	Cher	
December 16	"DJ Play a Christmas Song"	Cher	
December 23	"DJ Play a Christmas Song"	Cher	
December 30	"DJ Play a Christmas Song"	Cher	
