= List of number-one singles of 2023 (Croatia) =

This is a list of the Croatian number-one singles of 2023 as compiled by Croatia Songs, part of Hits of the World Billboard chart series, provided by Billboard.

Number-one singles, showing issue date, song and artist names
No.	Issue date	Song	Artist(s)	Ref.
17	7 January 2023	"Đerdan"	Sanja Vučić and Nucci	
18	14 January 2023	"La La La"	Voyage	
18	21 January 2023	"La La La"	Voyage	
19	28 January 2023	"Flowers"	Miley Cyrus	
19	4 February 2023	"Flowers"	Miley Cyrus	
19	11 February 2023	"Flowers"	Miley Cyrus	
20	18 February 2023	"Automatti"	Nucci	
20	25 February 2023	"Automatti"	Nucci	
20	4 March 2023	"Automatti"	Nucci	
21	11 March 2023	"S.O.S."	Jala Brat and Buba Corelli	
21	18 March 2023	"S.O.S."	Jala Brat and Buba Corelli	
21	25 March 2023	"S.O.S."	Jala Brat and Buba Corelli	
21	1 April 2023	"S.O.S."	Jala Brat and Buba Corelli	
21	8 April 2023	"S.O.S."	Jala Brat and Buba Corelli	
22	15 April 2023	"Drift"	Breskvica and Teodora	
22	22 April 2023	"Drift"	Breskvica and Teodora	
23	29 April 2023	"Mamma mia"	Grše	
23	6 May 2023	"Mamma mia"	Grše	
23	13 May 2023	"Mamma mia"	Grše	
23	20 May 2023	"Mamma mia"	Grše	
23	27 May 2023	"Mamma mia"	Grše	
23	3 June 2023	"Mamma mia"	Grše	
24	10 June 2023	"Tu tu tu"	Devito featuring Breskvica	
24	17 June 2023	"Tu tu tu"	Devito featuring Breskvica	
re	24 June 2023	"Mamma mia"	Grše	
re	1 July 2023	"Mamma mia"	Grše	
re	8 July 2023	"Mamma mia"	Grše	
re	15 July 2023	"Mamma mia"	Grše	
re	22 July 2023	"Mamma mia"	Grše	
re	29 July 2023	"Mamma mia"	Grše	
re	5 August 2023	"Mamma mia"	Grše	
re	12 August 2023	"Mamma mia"	Grše	
re	19 August 2023	"Mamma mia"	Grše	
re	26 August 2023	"Mamma mia"	Grše	
re	2 September 2023	"Mamma mia"	Grše	
25	9 September 2023	"Svrati"	Voyage	
25	16 September 2023	"Svrati"	Voyage	
26	23 September 2023	"Dam dam dam"	Aleksandra Prijović	
26	30 September 2023	"Dam dam dam"	Aleksandra Prijović	
26	7 October 2023	"Dam dam dam"	Aleksandra Prijović	
26	14 October 2023	"Dam dam dam"	Aleksandra Prijović	
26	21 October 2023	"Dam dam dam"	Aleksandra Prijović	
26	28 October 2023	"Dam dam dam"	Aleksandra Prijović	
26	4 November 2023	"Dam dam dam"	Aleksandra Prijović	
26	11 November 2023	"Dam dam dam"	Aleksandra Prijović	
26	18 November 2023	"Dam dam dam"	Aleksandra Prijović	
27	25 November 2023	"Ccokolada"	Desingerica	
27	2 December 2023	"Ccokolada"	Desingerica	
27	9 December 2023	"Ccokolada"	Desingerica	
re	16 December 2023	"Dam dam dam"	Aleksandra Prijović	
28	23 December 2023	"Jao mama"	Coby and Rouzi	
28	30 December 2023	"Jao mama"	Coby and Rouzi	

== Number-one artists of 2023 ==
List of number-one artists by total weeks at number one
Position	Artist	Weeks at No. 1
1	Grše	17
2	Aleksandra Prijović	10
3	Jala Brat	5
3	Buba Corelli	5
5	Breskvica	4
5	Nucci	4
5	Voyage	4
8	Desingerica	3
8	Miley Cyrus	3
10	Devito	2
10	Teodora	2
10	Coby	2
10	Rouzi	2
14	Sanja Vučić	1

== See also ==
- List of number-one albums of 2023 (Croatia)
