= List of Dutch Top 40 number-one singles of 2023 =

This is a list of the Dutch Top 40 number-one singles of 2023. The Dutch Top 40 is a chart that ranks the best-performing singles of the Netherlands. It is published every week by radio station Qmusic.

== Chart history ==
List of Dutch Top 40 number-one singles of 2023
Issue date	Song	Artist(s)	Ref.
7 January	"Ladada (Mon dernier mot)"	Claude	
14 January	"Ladada (Mon dernier mot)"	Claude	
21 January	"Ladada (Mon dernier mot)"	Claude	
28 January	"Flowers"	Miley Cyrus	
4 February	"Flowers"	Miley Cyrus	
11 February	"Flowers"	Miley Cyrus	
18 February	"Flowers"	Miley Cyrus	
25 February	"Flowers"	Miley Cyrus	
4 March	"Flowers"	Miley Cyrus	
11 March	"Flowers"	Miley Cyrus	
18 March	"Flowers"	Miley Cyrus	
25 March	"Flowers"	Miley Cyrus	
1 April	"Flowers"	Miley Cyrus	
8 April	"Flowers"	Miley Cyrus	
15 April	"Flowers"	Miley Cyrus	
22 April	"Flowers"	Miley Cyrus	
29 April	"Flowers"	Miley Cyrus	
6 May	"Flowers"	Miley Cyrus	
13 May	"Flowers"	Miley Cyrus	
20 May	"Tattoo"	Loreen	
27 May	"Tattoo"	Loreen	
3 June	"Tattoo"	Loreen	
10 June	"Tattoo"	Loreen	
17 June	"People"	Libianca	
24 June	"People"	Libianca	
1 July	"People"	Libianca	
8 July	"How You Samba"	Kris Kross Amsterdam, Sofía Reyes and Tinie Tempah	
15 July	"How You Samba"	Kris Kross Amsterdam, Sofía Reyes and Tinie Tempah	
22 July	"How You Samba"	Kris Kross Amsterdam, Sofía Reyes and Tinie Tempah	
29 July	"How You Samba"	Kris Kross Amsterdam, Sofía Reyes and Tinie Tempah	
5 August	"(It Goes Like) Nanana"	Peggy Gou	
12 August	"(It Goes Like) Nanana"	Peggy Gou	
19 August	"(It Goes Like) Nanana"	Peggy Gou	
26 August	"(It Goes Like) Nanana"	Peggy Gou	
2 September	"(It Goes Like) Nanana"	Peggy Gou	
9 September	"Dance the Night"	Dua Lipa	
16 September	"Dance the Night"	Dua Lipa	
23 September	"Dance the Night"	Dua Lipa	
30 September	"Dance the Night"	Dua Lipa	
7 October	"Greedy"	Tate McRae	
14 October	"Greedy"	Tate McRae	
21 October	"Greedy"	Tate McRae	
28 October	"Greedy"	Tate McRae	
4 November	"Greedy"	Tate McRae	
11 November	"Greedy"	Tate McRae	
18 November	"Greedy"	Tate McRae	
25 November	"Greedy"	Tate McRae	
2 December	"Greedy"	Tate McRae	
9 December	"Greedy"	Tate McRae	
16 December	"Greedy"	Tate McRae	
23 December	"Greedy"	Tate McRae	
30 December	"Greedy"	Tate McRae	

== Number-one artists ==
Position	Artist	Weeks No. 1
1	Miley Cyrus	16
2	Tate McRae	13
3	Peggy Gou	5
4	Loreen	4
4	Kris Kross Amsterdam	4
4	Sofía Reyes	4
4	Tinie Tempah	4
4	Dua Lipa	4
5	Claude	3
5	Libianca	3

== See also ==
- 2023 in music
