= Flowers (Miley Cyrus song) =

Single by Miley Cyrus

from the album Endless Summer Vacation
- Released: January 12, 2023
- Recorded: January 2022
- Studio: Sunset Sound Recorders (composed), Ridgemont High, Los Angeles (recorded)
- Genre: Disco; funk; pop rock
- Length: 3:20
- Label: Columbia
- Songwriters: Miley Cyrus; Gregory "Aldae" Hein; Michael Pollack
- Producers: Kid Harpoon; Tyler Johnson

Miley Cyrus singles chronology
"Without You" (2021)	"Flowers" (2023)	"River" (2023)

Music video
- "Flowers" on YouTube

"Flowers" is a song by American singer Miley Cyrus from her eighth studio album Endless Summer Vacation (2023). Columbia Records released it as the album's lead single on January 12, 2023, in some countries and on January 13 worldwide. Cyrus wrote "Flowers" with Gregory "Aldae" Hein and Michael Pollack, while Kid Harpoon and Tyler Johnson handled the production. A disco, funk and pop rock song, its lyrics express an ex-lover's acceptance of being independent after no longer feeling the need to rely on someone else to be complete.

"Flowers" received positive reviews from music critics and was a massive commercial success, breaking many records. It was the best-selling global single of 2023, earning 2.7 billion subscription streams equivalents globally, according to the International Federation of the Phonographic Industry (IFPI), making it Cyrus's most successful single worldwide to date. In the United States, the single debuted at number one and spent eight non-consecutive weeks atop the Billboard Hot 100 in addition to becoming Cyrus's second number-one song on the chart, after "Wrecking Ball" (2013). "Flowers" spent 57 weeks at the top of Billboard Adult Contemporary chart, becoming the longest-running number one-song on any Billboard airplay chart, and earned the most cumulative weeks atop all Billboard airplay charts of all time. The song was also a commercial success worldwide, debuting atop the Billboard Global 200 chart and staying at the summit for thirteen non-consecutive weeks. It topped 60 different charts of over 40 different countries, including in Australia, Canada, Denmark, Singapore, Germany, South Africa, France and the United Kingdom. It also broke a string of records on streaming services, including the Spotify record for the most-streamed song in a week (during both its first and second week), the fastest song in Spotify history to surpass one billion streams (doing so in 112 days), and the fastest female song to surpass two billion streams on Spotify (doing so in 502 days).

Jacob Bixenman directed the music video for "Flowers", which features Cyrus performing dances in several locations, including an outdoor pool, a backyard, and on the roof of her house. Photography took place in Los Angeles with scenes shot at Elysian Park. Cyrus performed the song live on the album's accompanying documentary concert special, Endless Summer Vacation (Backyard Sessions), and My Next Guest Needs No Introduction with David Letterman, and at the 66th Annual Grammy Awards. At the latter ceremony, "Flowers" won Record of the Year and Best Pop Solo Performance, and also received a nomination for Song of the Year, marking Cyrus' career-first set of Grammy wins. Following the song's performance at the 66th Annual Grammy Awards, it saw a surge in streaming numbers and sales and returned to the top ten of the Billboard Hot 100 in February 2024. The song also won Best International Song at the Brit Awards 2024.

== Production and release ==
"Flowers" was written by Miley Cyrus, Gregory "Aldae" Hein, and Michael Pollack in January 2022 in Sunset Sound Recorders studio in Hollywood, California. During a week of sessions, with the composers gathered around a piano, the song came together as a ballad, originally with a "slower and sadder" feel, according to Pollack. He said: "We started with the chorus and, if I remember correctly, the lyric, melody, and progression started to form simultaneously. It's one of those 'circle of fifths's songs where the melody informs the progression and vice versa. It practically wrote itself." The initial demo version of the song was a stripped-back ballad, only consisting of Cyrus singing and Pollack playing the Rhodes piano. Then it evolved into the uptempo song. Its final version was produced by Tyler Johnson and Kid Harpoon.

On December 31, 2022, while hosting her NBC live special Miley's New Year's Eve Party, Cyrus announced "Flowers" would be released simultaneously in all markets on January 13, 2023. The song was released on January 13 at UTC+00:00, which was still January 12 in some parts of the world. The demo version of the song was released digitally on March 3, 2023. It was also included on the digital version of Endless Summer Vacation album.

== Composition ==
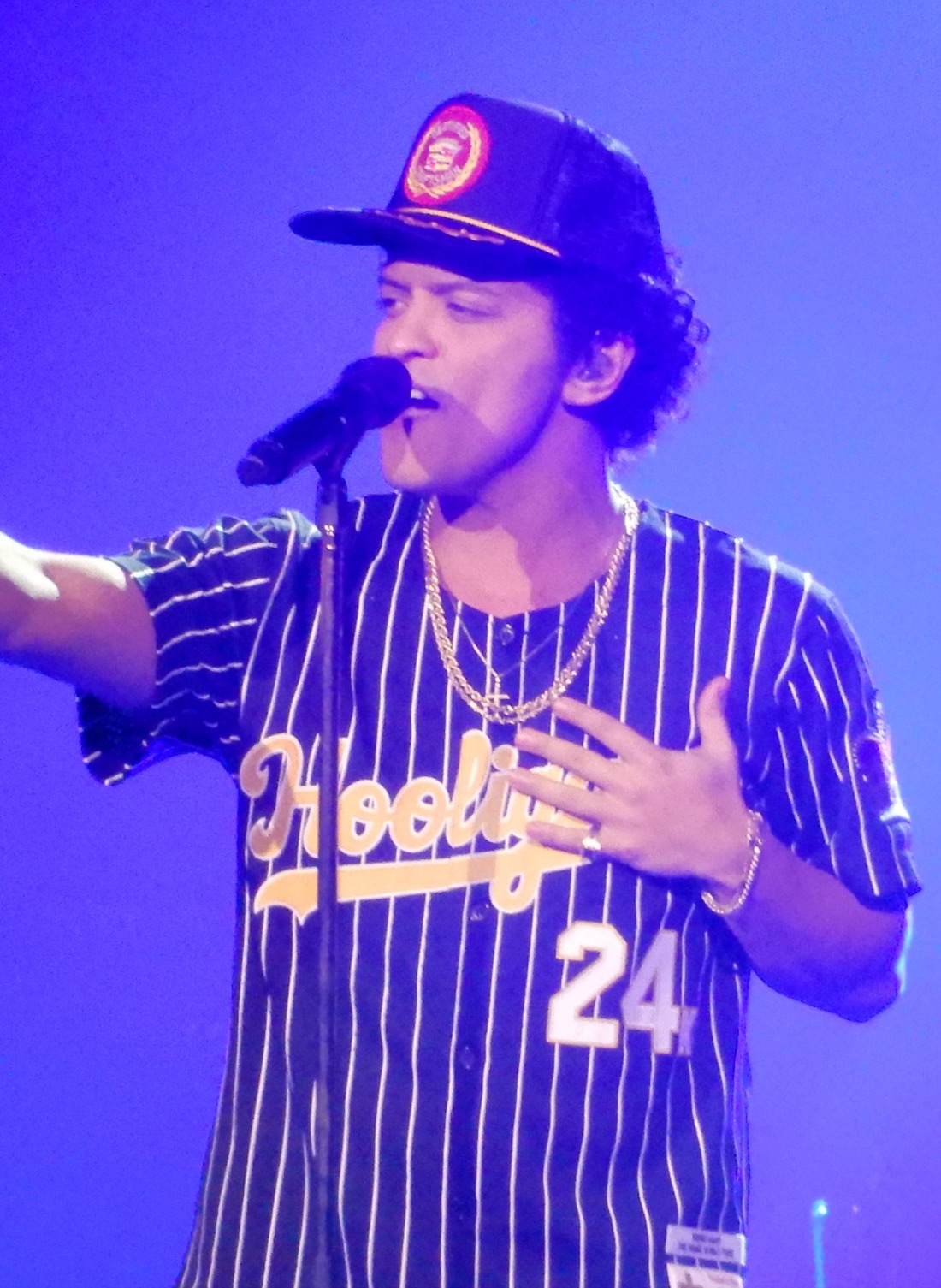
American singer Bruno Mars, whose song "When I Was Your Man" was allegedly paraphrased into lyrics of "Flowers".

"Flowers" is a disco, funk and pop rock song, with a moderate tempo of 118 beats per minute. Anna Gaca of Pitchfork described it as a "twangy" disco funk song with a string section reminiscent of flamenco. Gabrielle Sanchez of Yahoo! said, "A funky bassline guides the song, paired with a swooning string line and fizzy cymbals". Mary Siroky of Consequence thought that Cyrus's "raspy vocals offer an edge to the disco-toned anthem" and that the song interpolates Gloria Gaynor's "I Will Survive" (1978). She further opined that "Flowers" sounds like "if the hazy, peaceful California tone of 'Malibu' were to be applied to a dance pop track". Alexis Petridis of The Guardian noted its "shimmering electric guitar and understated yacht-rock mood," comparing it to Fleetwood Mac's 1977 album Rumours.

Gabrielle Sanchez of Yahoo! called "Flowers" "a spunky track about flaunting one's self-reliance and independence, no longer depending on someone else to feel complete". Anna Gaca from Pitchfork described it as a "revenge anthem". Mary Siroky of Consequence felt that Cyrus is "embracing her story as her own, stepping into her autonomy in a fully realized way". Dale Maplethorpe of Gigwise felt that "the theme of the song is self-love and acceptance". Jason Lipshutz of Billboard compared the song to Cyrus's 2019 single "Slide Away", adding that "Flowers" "focuses far more on self-sustainability than revenge, trading the melancholy of a song like ... 'Slide Away' for a more assertive outlook".

The song's chorus is allegedly a paraphrase of Bruno Mars's "When I Was Your Man" (2012). Editors of Billboard noted that the songs only feature similar lyrical elements and ideas, meaning that the writers of "When I Was Your Man" are not required to be credited as co-writers of "Flowers". Following its release, several publications suggested that "Flowers" was supposed to be a response song directed at Cyrus's ex-husband Liam Hemsworth, as it was released on Hemsworth's birthday and the lyrics refer to their Malibu, California, home which burned down in the November 2018 Woolsey Fire. Additionally, Hemsworth had reportedly dedicated "When I Was Your Man" to Cyrus.

== Critical reception ==
Critics' year-end rankings of "Flowers"
Publication	Rank
BBC	8
Billboard	4
Entertainment Weekly	5
The Guardian	17
New York Post	2
PopBuzz	6
Rolling Stone	12
South China Morning Post	5

"Flowers" received favorable reviews from music critics, with many complimenting Cyrus' vocal delivery. According to Billboard's Jason Lipshutz, the single is not a "full-blown reinvention" for Cyrus, but "sturdy, hummable pop, and it captivates without bells or whistles." The New York Times' Lindsay Zoladz described the song as "breezy" and opined that "the relatively subdued chorus melody may not demand much of Cyrus, but her vocals are imbued with a laid-back maturity and convincing self-assurance". Consequence's Mary Siroky was appreciative of the song and Cyrus, writing that the singer "has played with genre extensively throughout her career, and it's probably because her voice just sounds good in every single one of them." She went on to add to the praise, stating that "once the chorus [in 'Flowers'] hits, she arrives at the conclusion that everything is going to be okay, and there's even a strong chance she'll be better off going forward: 'I can take myself dancing/ And I can hold my own hand/ Yeah, I can love me better than you can'." She also gave the song their "Song of the Week" status. The Daily Telegraph's Neil McCormick called it "sophisticated perfection."

Dale Maplethorpe of Gigwise felt that Cyrus's "incredibly recognizable voice [chimes] in and [sounds] fantastic" and noted that in the chorus "we hear a funky bassline and killer drums that don't leave the listener with much else to do other than bust a move". However, he felt that the song "does feel like it doesn't build as much as it could do" and "is lacking in the big finish that it seems to tease". Writing for Pitchfork, Anna Gaca described the single as "generic", and Cyrus's vocal delivery as "sincerely unbothered". Gaca further negatively compared the song to "Shakira: Bzrp Music Sessions, Vol. 53", stating that "calling it revenge is a reach, not when Shakira is ready to call you a Twingo: What we're really dealing with here is self-help", implying that the latter addressed the revenge topic in a better way.

== Commercial performance ==
Upon its release, "Flowers" broke several records on Spotify. The song earned over 7.7 million plays in its first 24 hours on Spotify globally. On January 20, 2023, it achieved the second-highest single-day streams for a non-seasonal song, and fourth-highest overall, at the time, (Note: Brenda Lee's "Rockin' Around the Christmas Tree" (1958) surpassed "Flowers" on December 24, 2023, with over 18.9 million streams.) garnering over 18.4 million global plays on the streaming service.

During its first full seven days (January 13–20, 2023) the song earned 96,032,624 plays on Spotify globally, becoming the biggest week for a song in the platform's history (previously the record was held by Adele's "Easy on Me" with over 85 million streams). In the next seven days (January 21–27, 2023) it earned 115,156,896 plays, breaking the record again. It also became the fastest song to cross 100 million plays on Spotify globally (seven days), breaking the record previously held by BTS's "Butter" in eight days. Jana Coffey, Spotify's artist and label partnerships leader, noted that the popularity of "Flowers" had been growing day-after-day while streaming numbers for other record-breaking songs were the largest on their first days and then declined throughout the week. On May 4, 2023, it became the fastest song to earn 1 billion plays on Spotify globally (112 days), surpassing the Kid Laroi and Justin Bieber's "Stay" (2021) and Harry Styles's "As It Was" (2022) (both 118 days). (Note: On October 30, 2023, South Korean singer Jungkook's "Seven" featuring Latto surpassed "Flowers" and broke the record (108 days); albeit the latter remains the fastest solo song to do so.)

"Flowers" debuted atop the Billboard Global 200 and Billboard Global Excl. US charts, becoming Cyrus's first number-one single on both charts since their launch in September 2020. It topped both global charts for thirteen non-consecutive weeks, tying with Mariah Carey's "All I Want for Christmas Is You" as the second longest-running number-one on the Global 200, and with Harry Styles's "As It Was" (2022) as the longest-running number one on the Global Excl. US, respectively. (Note: Mariah Carey's "All I Want for Christmas Is You" (1994) broke out of the tie with "Flowers" on the Global 200 issue dated December 9, 2023, with its 14th week at number one, and eventually surpassed Harry Styles's "As It Was" (2022) as the longest-running number-one on the chart (18 weeks as of January 2024). On the Global Excl. U.S., the song joined the tie of "Flowers" and "As It Was" on the issue dated January 6, 2024, with 13 weeks atop the chart.) During its first three weeks it gained 179.1, 217.1 and 185.6 million streams worldwide consecutively, which became the fifth, second and fourth biggest weeks ever for a song in the Billboard Global 200's history. It also became the second song in the chart's history to gain over 100 million global streams for at least eight weeks, after the Kid Laroi and Justin Bieber's "Stay" in 2021. On the issue dated July 8, 2023, it returned to the number one on the Global 200 after a 10-week break, which was the longest gap in the chart's history, excluding "All I Want for Christmas Is You". It topped the 2023 year-end Global 200 and Global Excl. US charts.

According to Luminate, "Flowers" earned 1.16 billion streams worldwide until March 31, 2023, making it the most streamed song of the first quarter of 2023. It was the most-streamed song on Spotify and Deezer and second most-streamed on Apple Music globally in 2023.

"Flowers" was the best-selling global single of 2023, earning 2.70 billion subscription streams equivalents globally, according to the International Federation of the Phonographic Industry (IFPI). It won the IFPI Global Single Award of 2023, becoming Cyrus' first appearance on an IFPI annual global Top 10 chart.

It ranked 16th in the 2024 year-end Global 200 chart.

=== North America ===
During the first five hours of availability on January 12, 2023, "Flowers" gained 685,000 streams, 2.4 million radio airplay audience impressions, and 2,000 digital downloads sold and debuted at number 21 on the Digital Songs chart. After its first full week (January 13–19) "Flowers" debuted atop the Billboard Hot 100, becoming the 65th song to do so, Cyrus's second number-one single after "Wrecking Ball" in 2013 and her 11th top ten entry. Due to garnering 52.6 million streams, 33.5 million radio airplay audience impressions and 70,000 digital downloads sold, it debuted atop the Streaming Songs, rose to number one of the Digital Song Sales and debuted at number 18 of the Radio Songs. The same week, Cyrus reached her career top of number three on Billboard Artist 100 chart and her back catalog had an increase of 65% in streaming in the United States. "Flowers" spent eight non-consecutive weeks atop the Hot 100. It also became the second song ever after Harry Styles' "As It Was" (2022) to spend its debut 20 weeks in the chart's top-three region. It became the highest streamed song in a week since Drake's "Way 2 Sexy" in September 2021 due to 59.8 million streams in its second week, as well as the first song with two consecutive weeks of at least 50 million streams since Olivia Rodrigo's "Drivers License" in January 2021, the first non-holiday song with three consecutive weeks of at least 40 million streams since Rodrigo's "Good 4 U" in June 2021, and the first song to sell over 30,000 in three consecutive weeks since Coldplay and BTS's "My Universe" in October 2021. It topped the Streaming Songs and Digital Songs charts for four and five consecutive weeks, respectively.

After one month of release in the United States, "Flowers" became Cyrus's 11th biggest hit in total radio airplay audience due to 233 million impressions and her 13th biggest in on-demand streaming due to 182 million streams. In its fifth week it topped the Radio Songs and Pop Airplay charts. It became Cyrus's first number-one single on Radio Songs and the fourth song to top it in five weeks at most since it became an all-format chart in December 1998. It also became the 13th song in history to top Pop Airplay in five weeks at most. In its sixth week, "Flowers" became Cyrus's first number-one on the Adult Pop Airplay and Dance/Mix Show Airplay charts. It spent 18 consecutive weeks atop Radio Songs, tying with the Goo Goo Dolls's "Iris" (1998) as the second longest-running number-one on the chart. On the issue dated April 15, 2023, it became Cyrus's second number-one song on the Adult Contemporary chart. Also that week, "Flowers" became the seventh song ever to top the Pop Airplay, Adult Pop Airplay, and Adult Contemporary charts concurrently. The single topped the three charts for 10, 17, and 57 weeks, respectively. It became the third song ever to top all three charts simultaneously for at least four weeks, after Adele's "Hello" (2015) and Celine Dion's "Because You Loved Me" (1996). The song became the longest-running chart-topper in the over 60-year history of Adult Contemporary; it broke the record previously held by Maroon 5's "Girls Like You", which spent 36 weeks at number one. It eventually became the first song to top the Adult Contemporary chart for a full year. In July 2024, due to charting 56 weeks atop Adult Contemporary, "Flowers" earned the most weeks at the summit of a Billboard airplay chart. With 17 weeks atop the Adult Pop Airplay chart, it tied with "Iris" (1998) by Goo Goo Dolls as the sixth longest-running leader, and became the longest-running among women, at the time, in the chart's history. (Note: Surpassed by "Cruel Summer" (2023) by Taylor Swift as the longest-running number-one among women on the Adult Pop Airplay chart on the issue dated January 13, 2024, which marked the song's 18th week at the summit.) In January 2024, "Flowers" became the song with the most cumulative weeks atop the three charts (64 by then). In 2024, "Flowers" achieved the most cumulative weeks at number one on all Billboard airplay charts (106), (Note: "Flowers" topped the following airplay charts in the US for the mentioned number of weeks, totaling 106 cumulative weeks: 57 weeks on Adult Contemporary, 18 weeks on Radio Songs, 17 weeks on Adult Pop Airplay, 10 weeks on Pop Airplay, and 4 weeks on Dance/Mix Show Airplay.) surpassing The Weeknd's "Blinding Lights (87); and became the first song to spend 100 cumulative weeks at the top spot across said charts. "Flowers" became the 21st song in chart history to spend at least a full year (52 weeks), cumulatively, on the Billboard airplay charts.

According to Luminate, "Flowers" earned 750.7 million on-demand audio and video streams (including user-generated content streams), 380,000 downloads, and 2.4 billion radio audience impressions in the US until June 29, 2023—making it the most-streamed, most-downloaded, and most-heard song on the radio of the first half of 2023. Ultimately, "Flowers" ended 2023 as the fourth most-streamed, second best-selling digital track, and most-consumed song on the radio in the US (with 634.4 million on-demand audio streams, 428,000 downloads, and 3.9 billion radio audience impressions until December 28, 2023). It ranked second on the 2023 year-end Hot 100 chart, only behind Morgan Wallen's "Last Night", and topped the year-end Radio Songs and Adult Pop Airplay charts. It was the third most-streamed song in the United States on Spotify in 2023. "Flowers" was the most-heard song across iHeartRadio's stations in the US in 2023, with over 1.4 billion audience impressions.

Following Cyrus's performance of "Flowers" at the 66th Annual Grammy Awards, the song surged 22 spots from number 32 to number 10 on the Billboard Hot 100, re-entering the top-ten of the chart and spending its 29th week in the region, on the issue dated February 17, 2024—over a year after its release. The following week, it slipped to number 17, and marked 52 weeks of charting on the Hot 100, becoming Cyrus's first song to chart for a year in the US. On the issue dated March 30, 2024, "Flowers" departed the Hot 100, due to the chart's recurrent rule. With 55 weeks, it became Cyrus's longest-charting song in the US. It topped the 2024 year-end Adult Contemporary chart. On March 27, 2025, the single was certified 7× Platinum by the RIAA.

In Canada, "Flowers" spent its debut fifteen weeks atop the Canadian Hot 100. It tied Mark Ronson's "Uptown Funk" (featuring Bruno Mars) (2014) as the fourth longest-running number-one in Canada; and became Cyrus's second number-one single after "Wrecking Ball" in 2013. It also became her first number-one on All-format Airplay and Hot AC Airplay charts, and her second on Digital Song Sales, CHR/Top 40 Airplay and AC Airplay charts. It topped the 2023 year-end Canadian Hot 100 chart. It was the second most-streamed song in Canada on Spotify in 2023. On April 23, 2024, the song was certified Diamond by Music Canada for shipment of 800 thousand units.

=== International ===
In the United Kingdom, "Flowers" debuted atop the UK Singles Chart with 92,000 chart units, partially due to 9.9 million streams, which was the biggest first week overall since Harry Styles's "As It Was" in April 2022. The song topped the chart for ten consecutive weeks, becoming Cyrus's third number-one song in Britain after "We Can't Stop" and "Wrecking Ball" (both from 2013) and her first to remain at the top for longer than one week. It became the third song of the 2020s, after Styles's "As It Was" and Ed Sheeran's "Bad Habits" to top it for at least ten weeks. On March 15, 2024, the song was certified triple Platinum by the British Phonographic Industry for shipment of 1.8 million units. By the end of 2023, the song amassed 198 million streams, 91,000 downloads, and 1.7 million track-equivalent units in the United Kingdom; making it the most-streamed and most-downloaded song of the year. "Flowers" topped the UK year-end singles chart. It was the most-streamed song in the UK in 2023, with 198 million streams earned that year. The most-streamed song on Apple Music and Deezer and second most-streamed on Spotify in the UK in 2023, were among its feats.

In Germany, "Flowers" debuted at number two on the Offizielle Deutschen Singles Charts and climbed to the top position in the second week, becoming Cyrus's first chart-topper in the country. It ranked second at the 2023 year-end German chart, first among the foreign acts. Also, in France, "Flowers" debuted at number two on the Top Singles chart and climbed to the top position in the second week, becoming Cyrus's first chart-topper in the country. It was the most-streamed song in France in 2023.

Outside Europe, "Flowers" topped the charts in Australia, Ecuador, New Zealand, Paraguay, Philippines, Singapore, South Africa, and Vietnam, as well as the overall Middle East and North Africa streaming chart and the overall Commonwealth of Independent States airplay chart. In Australia, it amassed over 5 million streams in its first week, breaking the first-week record in the country's history. The song spent its first twelve weeks atop the ARIA Singles Chart, making it Cyrus's first chart-topper in Australia and the eleventh song in history to top the chart for at least twelve weeks. It topped the Australia year-end singles chart. In 2024, the song was certified 10× Platinum by the Australian Recording Industry Association for selling 700,000 equivalent units.

== Music video ==
The January 12, 2023, release of "Flowers" was accompanied by its music video on Cyrus's Vevo channel via YouTube. It was directed by Jacob Bixenman, with cinematography by Marcell Rév. The video reached one billion views in March 2025.

The video's opening uses panorama-view footage of Los Angeles above the downtown skyline. Cyrus is first seen by walking across a bridge in Elysian Park and slowly dancing up her driveway. When she arrives at her backyard, she strips into her bikini as she walks past the sprinklers, goes swimming in her swimming pool, and does different workouts and exercises. Then she takes a shower and changes into a black suit coat and pants, eventually begins to dance through her house. By nightfall, she dances in her backyard and then dances on her roof as a helicopter flies above.

Vogue classified Cyrus dressed in vintage gold lamé gown from the Yves Saint Laurent Autumn/Winter 1991–92 collection, accessorized with square Saint Laurent sunglasses, noting that "somewhere in the metaphorical vintage hall of fame, a second-life savant is affixing a plaque with Miley Cyrus's name to the wall". Hello! reported that her black underwear has generated trending online searches for "black lingerie sets", with search numbers increasing 413% following the release of the "Flowers" music video on January 13, 2023.

== Performances and usage ==
=== Live performances ===
Cyrus performed "Flowers" in the documentary concert special Endless Summer Vacation (Backyard Sessions), which was released on Disney+ on March 10, 2023. On November 21, 2023, she performed it live for the first time—over 10 months after the song's release—during a private event at the Chateau Marmont hotel in Los Angeles. The performance was uploaded to her YouTube channel later that month.

The first televised performance of "Flowers" took place at the 66th Annual Grammy Awards on February 4, 2024, over a year after its release. Cyrus again performed the song in a private concert at the Chateau Marmont; it was filmed and featured in the premiere episode of the fifth season of Netflix's My Next Guest Needs No Introduction with David Letterman, released in June 2024—which she was the subject of. In July, she performed a "slowed-down" version at the same venue for the Gucci Summer Celebration party, which she hosted.

=== Usage in media ===
- "Flowers" was used as the soundtrack to the commercial for Gorgeous Orchid, a fragrance from the Gucci Flora line, starring Cyrus.
- The song was used in the 2025 DreamWorks Animation film, Dog Man during the scene in the morning after Dog Man is taken off the Petey case, playing on the radio. Dog Man eats breakfast alongside this piece of music, and seeing as "Flowers" is a song about being comfortable being alone, it is just as apt as the previous piece.

== Impact ==
In regard to the massive radio success and longevity "Flowers" experienced, Jon Zellner, iHeartMedia president, programming operations/digital music, told Billboard that "it is one of those songs that has stood the test of time at multiple formats". He described the track as "a mass-appeal song with a very strong hook and sounds like a song you already knew the first time you heard it". Zellner further stated that it was "among songs that will be part of radio station libraries and streaming playlists for many years and likely played by classic hits stations 20 years from now.

== Lawsuit ==
In September 2024, Cyrus and "Flowers" co-writers of Gregory Hein and Michael Pollack, along with Sony Music Publishing and distributors of the song, were sued for copying portions of Bruno Mars' 2012 "When I Was Your Man". The lawsuit was brought in Los Angeles federal court by Tempo Music Investments, a company which had bought the songwriting rights of "When I Was Your Man" co-writer Philip Lawrence; Mars and the other co-writers, however, are not named as a plaintiffs. Tempo claimed that "Flowers" includes unauthorized "exploitation" of "When I Was Your Man". While "Flowers" had widely been recognized as a response to "Man", Tempo proffered that Cyrus's song "had lifted numerous elements beyond the clap-back lyrics, including 'melodic and harmonic material,' 'pitch ending pattern,' and 'bass-line structure.'" Lawyers for the "Flowers" writers countered that "the allegedly copied elements are random, scattered, unprotected ideas and musical building blocks".

In November, 2024, Cyrus's lawyers filed for dismissal of the lawsuit on the procedural ground that Tempo did not have standing to sue without the participation of the song's other co-writers or co-owners, but in March 2025 the court denied the motion, saying that Lawrence could have sued on his own as a co-writer to enforce the copyright, and Tempo "steps into Lawrence's shoes and is a co‐owner of the exclusive rights of the copyright". In February 2026, Cyrus's lawyers again filed for dismissal, this time on the merits, arguing that the suit is based on lyrics "which are commonplace tropes in breakup songs", but this motion was also denied, allowing the case to proceed as of June 2026.

== Cover versions ==
- In January 2023, Irish rock band Inhaler covered the song as part of their BBC Radio 1 Live Lounge session.
- In February 2023, the song was covered by American pop punk band Bowling for Soup and released as a single.
- In June 2023, English rock band Nothing but Thieves performed an indie rock rendition of the song on Like a Version.
- In March 2023, the song was covered by Yuqi of K-pop group (G)I-DLE and released on YouTube on March 14, 2023.
- In December 2023, Norwegian musician Sondre Lerche released a holiday cover of "Flowers".
- In June 2024, American singer-songwriter Kelly Clarkson covered the song for the "Kellyoke" segment of her daytime talk show The Kelly Clarkson Show.
- In July 2024, American comedy artist "Weird Al" Yankovic covered the song for his polka medley "Polkamania!".
- In April 2025, French violinist Esther Abrami covered the song on violin for her album Women.

== Accolades ==
Awards and nominations for "Flowers"
Organization	Year	Category	Result	Ref.
MTV MIAW Awards	2023	Global Hit of the Year	Nominated	
Nickelodeon Mexico Kids' Choice Awards	2023	Global Hit of the Year	Nominated	
MTV Video Music Awards	2023	Video of the Year	Nominated	
MTV Video Music Awards	2023	Song of the Year	Nominated	
MTV Video Music Awards	2023	Best Pop	Nominated	
MTV Video Music Awards	2023	Best Cinematography (Note: Nomination for the cinematographer Marcell Rév.)	Nominated	
MTV Europe Music Awards	2023	Best Song	Nominated	
MTV Europe Music Awards	2023	Best Video	Nominated	
Los 40 Music Awards	2023	Best International Song	Nominated	
NRJ Music Awards	2023	International Song of the Year	Won	
NRJ Music Awards	2023	International Video of the Year	Won	
Danish Music Awards	2023	International Hit of the Year	Won	
Billboard Music Awards	2023	Top Hot 100 Song	Nominated	
Billboard Music Awards	2023	Top Radio Song	Won	
Billboard Music Awards	2023	Top Streaming Song	Nominated	
Billboard Music Awards	2023	Top Selling Song	Nominated	
Billboard Music Awards	2023	Top Billboard Global 200 Song	Won	
Billboard Music Awards	2023	Top Billboard Global (Excl. U.S.) Song	Won	
Musa Awards	2023	International Anglo Song of the Year	Won	
RTHK International Pop Poll Awards	2023	Top Ten International Gold Songs	Won	
Grammy Awards	2024	Record of the Year (Note: Award for: Miley Cyrus, performer; Kid Harpoon and Tyler Johnson, producers; Michael Pollack, Brian Rajaratnam & Mark "Spike" Stent, engineers/mixers; Joe LaPorta, mastering engineer.)	Won	
Grammy Awards	2024	Song of the Year (Note: Nomination for songwriters: Miley Cyrus, Gregory "Aldae" Hein and Michael Pollack.)	Nominated	
Grammy Awards	2024	Best Pop Solo Performance	Won	
People's Choice Awards	2024	The Song of the Year	Nominated	
IFPI Awards	2024	IFPI Global Single Award of 2023	Won	
Gaffa Awards (Denmark)	2024	International Hit of the Year	Won	
Brit Awards	2024	International Song of the Year	Won	
Japan Gold Disc Awards	2024	Song of the Year by Streaming (Western music)	Won	
Global Awards	2024	Best Song	Nominated	
Gaffa Awards (Sweden)	2024	International Song of the Year	Nominated	
iHeartRadio Music Awards	2024	Song of the Year	Nominated	
iHeartRadio Music Awards	2024	Pop Song of the Year	Won	
iHeartRadio Music Awards	2024	Best Music Video	Nominated	
iHeartRadio Music Awards	2024	Best Lyrics	Nominated	
Swiss Music Awards	2024	Best Hit – International	Won	
BMI Pop Awards	2024	Song of the Year (Note: Awards for songwriters: Miley Cyrus, Gregory "Aldae" Hein and Michael Pollack.)	Won	
BMI Pop Awards	2024	Most-Performed Songs of the Year	Won	
Nickelodeon Kids' Choice Awards	2024	Favorite Song	Nominated	

== Credits and personnel ==
Credits adapted from Tidal, Pitchfork and the liner notes of Endless Summer Vacation.

=== Recording ===
- Written at Sunset Sound Recorders
- Recorded at Ridgemont High, Los Angeles
- Mixed at Windmill Lane Studios, Dublin
- Mastered at Sterling Sound, Edgewater, New Jersey

=== Personnel ===
- Miley Cyrus – vocals, songwriting, executive production, vocal percussion, acoustic guitar
- Kid Harpoon – production, bass guitar, drums, percussion, acoustic guitar, synthesizer
- Gregory "Aldae" Hein – songwriting
- Tyler Johnson – production, electric guitar, Wurlitzer keyboards, synthesizer
- Joe LaPorta – mastering engineering
- Rob Moose – string arrangement, violin, viola
- Michael Pollack – songwriting, Rhodes piano
- Brian Rajaratnam – engineering
- Doug Showalter – keyboards
- Mark "Spike" Stent – mixing engineering
- Matt Wolach – assistant engineering

== Charts ==
=== Weekly charts ===
Weekly chart performance
Chart (2023–2024)	Peak position
Argentina Hot 100 (Billboard)	3
Australia (ARIA)	1
Austria (Ö3 Austria Top 40)	1
Belarus Airplay (TopHit)	1
Belgium (Ultratop 50 Flanders)	1
Belgium (Ultratop 50 Wallonia)	1
Bolivia (Billboard)	2
Brazil (Billboard)	4
Bulgaria Airplay (PROPHON)	1
Canada Hot 100 (Billboard)	1
Canada AC (Billboard)	1
Canada CHR/Top 40 (Billboard)	1
Canada Hot AC (Billboard)	1
Chile (Billboard)	5
CIS Airplay (TopHit)	1
Colombia (Billboard)	4
Costa Rica Airplay (FONOTICA)	2
Croatia (Billboard)	1
Czech Republic Airplay (ČNS IFPI)	1
Czech Republic Singles Digital (ČNS IFPI)	1
Denmark (Tracklisten)	1
Ecuador (Billboard)	3
Ecuador Airplay (National-Report)	1
El Salvador Airplay (Monitor Latino)	2
Estonia Airplay (TopHit)	1
Finland (Suomen virallinen lista)	1
France (SNEP)	1
Germany (GfK)	1
Greece International Streaming (IFPI)	1
Global 200 (Billboard)	1
Guatemala Airplay (Monitor Latino)	12
Honduras Airplay (Monitor Latino)	3
Hong Kong (Billboard)	16
Hungary (Rádiós Top 40)	1
Hungary (Single Top 40)	1
Hungary (Stream Top 40)	1
Iceland (Tónlistinn)	1
India International Streaming (IMI)	4
Indonesia (Billboard)	8
Ireland (IRMA)	1
Israel (Mako Hitlist)	78
Italy (FIMI)	3
Japan Hot Overseas (Billboard)	1
Kazakhstan Airplay (TopHit)	1
Latvia Streaming (LaIPA)	1
Lebanon (Lebanese Top 20)	2
Lithuania (AGATA)	1
Luxembourg (Billboard)	1
Malaysia (Billboard)	2
Middle East and North Africa (IFPI)	1
Mexico (Billboard)	2
Moldova Airplay (TopHit)	2
Netherlands (Dutch Top 40)	1
Netherlands (Single Top 100)	1
New Zealand (Recorded Music NZ)	1
Nicaragua Airplay (Monitor Latino)	8
Nigeria (TurnTable charts)	23
Norway (VG-lista)	1
Panama Airplay (Monitor Latino)	2
Paraguay Airplay (Monitor Latino)	1
Peru (Billboard)	2
Philippines (Billboard)	1
Poland (Polish Airplay Top 100)	1
Poland (Polish Streaming Top 100)	1
Portugal (AFP)	1
Puerto Rico Airplay (Monitor Latino)	10
Romania (Billboard)	1
Romania Airplay (UPFR)	1
Romania Airplay (Media Forest)	1
Romania TV Airplay (Media Forest)	1
Russia Airplay (TopHit)	1
San Marino Airplay (SMRTV Top 50)	2
Singapore (RIAS)	1
Slovakia Airplay (ČNS IFPI)	1
Slovakia Singles Digital (ČNS IFPI)	1
South Africa (Billboard)	1
South Korea (Circle)	117
Spain (Promusicae)	2
Suriname (Nationale Top 40)	2
Sweden (Sverigetopplistan)	1
Switzerland (Schweizer Hitparade)	1
Taiwan (Billboard)	9
Turkey International Airplay (Radiomonitor Türkiye)	1
United Arab Emirates (IFPI)	14
UK Singles (Official Charts)	1
Ukraine Airplay (TopHit)	1
Uruguay Airplay (Monitor Latino)	6
US Billboard Hot 100	1
US Adult Contemporary (Billboard)	1
US Adult Pop Airplay (Billboard)	1
US Dance Airplay (Billboard)	1
US Pop Airplay (Billboard)	1
US Rhythmic Airplay (Billboard)	14
Venezuela Airplay (Record Report)	25
Vietnam (Vietnam Hot 100)	1

=== Monthly charts ===
Monthly chart performance
Chart (2023)	Peak position
Belarus Airplay (TopHit)	2
Brazil Streaming (Pro-Música Brasil)	13
CIS Airplay (TopHit)	1
Czech Republic (Rádio – Top 100)	1
Czech Republic (Singles Digitál – Top 100)	3
Estonia Airplay (TopHit)	1
Kazakhstan Airplay (TopHit)	1
Lithuania Airplay (TopHit)	1
Moldova Airplay (TopHit)	1
Paraguay Airplay (SGP)	3
Romania Airplay (TopHit)	1
Russia Airplay (TopHit)	1
Slovakia (Rádio – Top 100)	1
Slovakia (Singles Digitál – Top 100)	1
South Korea (Circle)	122
Ukraine Airplay (TopHit)	1

=== Year-end charts ===
2023 year-end chart performance
Chart (2023)	Position
Argentina Airplay (Monitor Latino)	1
Australia (ARIA)	1
Austria (Ö3 Austria Top 40)	1
Belarus Airplay (TopHit)	1
Belgium (Ultratop 50 Flanders)	1
Belgium (Ultratop 50 Wallonia)	1
Brazil Airplay (Crowley Charts)	50
Brazil Streaming (Pro-Música Brasil)	43
Bulgaria Airplay (PROPHON)	1
Canada (Canadian Hot 100)	1
CIS Airplay (TopHit)	1
Colombia Airplay (Monitor Latino)	52
Denmark (Tracklisten)	1
El Salvador Airplay (ASAP EGC)	9
Estonia Airplay (TopHit)	1
France (SNEP)	1
Germany (GfK)	2
Global 200 (Billboard)	1
Global Singles (IFPI)	1
Hungary (Rádiós Top 40)	2
Hungary (Single Top 40)	36
Iceland (Tónlistinn)	13
Italy (FIMI)	17
Kazakhstan Airplay (TopHit)	1
Lithuania Airplay (TopHit)	1
Mexico Airplay (Monitor Latino)	1
Moldova Airplay (TopHit)	16
Netherlands (Dutch Top 40)	1
Netherlands (Single Top 100)	4
New Zealand (Recorded Music NZ)	1
Paraguay Airplay (Monitor Latino)	1
Poland (Polish Airplay Top 100)	1
Poland (Polish Streaming Top 100)	2
Romania Airplay (TopHit)	2
Russia Airplay (TopHit)	3
Sweden (Sverigetopplistan)	4
Switzerland (Schweizer Hitparade)	1
UK Singles (OCC)	1
Ukraine Airplay (TopHit)	2
US Billboard Hot 100	2
US Adult Contemporary (Billboard)	4
US Adult Top 40 (Billboard)	1
US Dance/Mix Show Airplay (Billboard)	4
US Mainstream Top 40 (Billboard)	2

2024 year-end chart performance
Chart (2024)	Position
Australia (ARIA)	39
Austria (Ö3 Austria Top 40)	36
Belarus Airplay (TopHit)	59
Belgium (Ultratop 50 Flanders)	47
Belgium (Ultratop 50 Wallonia)	65
Canada (Canadian Hot 100)	44
CIS Airplay (TopHit)	19
Denmark (Tracklisten)	66
Estonia Airplay (TopHit)	82
France (SNEP)	57
Germany (GfK)	33
Global 200 (Billboard)	16
Hungary (Rádiós Top 40)	18
Iceland (Tónlistinn)	22
Kazakhstan Airplay (TopHit)	153
Lithuania Airplay (TopHit)	23
Moldova Airplay (TopHit)	122
New Zealand (Recorded Music NZ)	35
Poland (Polish Airplay Top 100)	58
Poland (Polish Streaming Top 100)	90
Portugal (AFP)	72
Romania Airplay (TopHit)	42
Russia Airplay (TopHit)	78
Switzerland (Schweizer Hitparade)	21
UK Singles (OCC)	54
US Billboard Hot 100	69
US Adult Contemporary (Billboard)	1
US Adult Top 40 (Billboard)	24
Venezuela Rock Airplay (Record Report)	10

2025 year-end chart performance
Chart (2025)	Position
Argentina Anglo Airplay (Monitor Latino)	17
Belarus Airplay (TopHit)	106
Bolivia Airplay (Monitor Latino)	95
Chile Airplay (Monitor Latino)	31
CIS Airplay (TopHit)	50
Estonia Airplay (TopHit)	101
France (SNEP)	188
Global 200 (Billboard)	84
Hungary (Rádiós Top 40)	47
Lithuania Airplay (TopHit)	53
Moldova Airplay (TopHit)	69
Romania Airplay (TopHit)	101
Russia Airplay (TopHit)	155
US Adult Contemporary (Billboard)	9

== Certifications ==
Certifications
Region	Certification	Certified units/sales
Australia (ARIA)	10× Platinum	700,000^{‡}
Austria (IFPI Austria)	5× Platinum	150,000^{‡}
Belgium (BRMA)	3× Platinum	120,000^{‡}
Brazil (Pro-Música Brasil)	5× Diamond	800,000^{‡}
Canada (Music Canada)	Diamond	800,000^{‡}
Denmark (IFPI Danmark)	3× Platinum	270,000^{‡}
France (SNEP)	Diamond	333,333^{‡}
Germany (BVMI)	2× Platinum	1,200,000^{‡}
Hungary (MAHASZ)	11× Platinum	44,000^{‡}
Italy (FIMI)	4× Platinum	400,000^{‡}
Mexico (AMPROFON)	3× Diamond+2× Platinum	2,380,000^{‡}
New Zealand (RMNZ)	7× Platinum	210,000^{‡}
Poland (ZPAV)	Diamond	250,000^{‡}
Portugal (AFP)	6× Platinum	60,000^{‡}
Spain (Promusicae)	7× Platinum	420,000^{‡}
Switzerland (IFPI Switzerland)	5× Platinum	100,000^{‡}
United Kingdom (BPI)	4× Platinum	2,400,000^{‡}
United States (RIAA)	7× Platinum	7,000,000^{‡}
Streaming
Greece (IFPI Greece)	4× Platinum	8,000,000^{†}
Sweden (GLF)	3× Platinum	24,000,000^{†}
Worldwide	—	2,700,000,000 (Note: (only streams equivalent))
^{‡} Sales+streaming figures based on certification alone.^{†} Streaming-only figures based on certification alone.

== Release history ==
"Flowers" release history
Region	Date	Format(s)	Version	Label	Ref.
Various	January 12, 2023	Digital download; streaming	Original	Columbia	
United States	January 16, 2023	Adult contemporary radio; hot adult contemporary radio; modern adult contemporary radio	Original	Columbia	
United States	January 17, 2023	Contemporary hit radio	Original	Columbia	
Italy	January 19, 2023	Radio airplay	Original	Sony	
Various	March 3, 2023	Digital download; streaming	Demo	Columbia	
Various	March 3, 2023	Digital download	Instrumental	Columbia	

== See also ==
- List of Billboard Adult Contemporary number ones of 2023
- List of Billboard Adult Contemporary number ones of 2024
- List of Billboard Global 200 number ones of 2023
- List of Billboard Hot 100 number ones of 2023
- List of Billboard Hot 100 top-ten singles in 2023
- List of Billboard Hot 100 number-one singles of the 2020s
- List of Billboard Streaming Songs number ones of 2023
- List of Billboard Digital Song Sales number ones of 2023
- List of Billboard number-one dance songs of 2023
- List of Radio Songs number ones of the 2020s
- List of highest-certified singles in Australia
- List of number-one singles of 2023 (Australia)
- List of number-one hits of 2023 (Austria)
- List of Canadian Hot 100 number-one singles of 2023
- List of Dutch Top 40 number-one singles of 2023
- List of number-one singles of 2023 (Croatia)
- List of number-one songs of the 2020s (Czech Republic)
- List of number-one hits of 2023 (Denmark)
- List of number-one hits of 2023 (France)
- List of top 10 singles in 2023 (France)
- List of number-one hits of 2023 (Germany)
- List of number-one singles of the 2020s (Hungary)
- List of number-one singles of 2023 (Finland)
- List of number-one singles of 2023 (Ireland)
- List of number-one singles from the 2020s (New Zealand)
- List of number-one songs in Norway
- List of number-one singles of 2023 (Poland)
- List of number-one songs of the 2020s (Slovakia)
- List of number-one singles of the 2020s (Sweden)
- List of number-one hits of 2023 (Switzerland)
- List of UK Singles Chart number ones of 2023
- List of UK top-ten singles in 2023
- List of Ultratop 50 number-one singles of 2023
- List of Billboard Hot 100 chart achievements and milestones
- List of Australian chart achievements and milestones
- UK Singles Chart records and statistics
- List of best-selling singles by year in the United Kingdom
- List of Spotify streaming records
