= Adult Contemporary (chart) =

US record chart published by Billboard magazine

The Adult Contemporary chart is published weekly by Billboard magazine and lists the most popular songs on adult contemporary radio stations in the United States. The chart is compiled based on airplay data submitted to Billboard by stations that are members of the Adult Contemporary radio panel. The chart debuted in Billboard magazine on July 17, 1961. Over the years, the chart has undergone a series of name changes, being called Easy Listening (1961–1962; 1965–1979), Middle-Road Singles (1962–1964), Pop-Standard Singles (1964–1965), Hot Adult Contemporary (1984–1996) and Adult Contemporary (1979–1984, 1996–present). The current number-one song on the chart, as of the issue of Billboard dated November 21, 2026, is "Ordinary" by Alex Warren.

== Chart history ==
The Billboard Easy listening chart, as it was first known, was born of a desire by some radio stations in the late 1950s and early 1960s to continue playing current hit songs but distinguish themselves from being branded as "rock and roll" stations. Billboard had written articles about this trend during the time, and the magazine's editors decided to publish a separate chart for these songs beginning in 1961. The magazine offered an "Easy Listening" programming guide beginning January 9, 1961, which continued until the numbered chart appeared in July. The first No. 1 song on the Billboard Easy Listening chart was "The Boll Weevil Song" by Brook Benton.

From 1961 to 1965, this chart was compiled from the Billboard Hot 100 chart by removing songs that were deemed rock and roll by the magazine and re-ranking the remaining songs. (Record World's equivalent "non-rock" chart followed the same criteria from 1967 through 1971.) Beginning in 1965, the Easy Listening chart would begin to be compiled by a method similar to the one used for other Billboard singles charts: reported playlists from radio stations airing the format as well as sales data submitted by record stores. By the early 1990s, automatic song detection and barcode sales information had begun to be the norm for most of the Billboard charts, although by this time the AC chart was based entirely on radio airplay and no longer incorporated retail sales reports. Currently the Adult Contemporary chart is compiled in much the same way as for other radio formats.

The chart was known as the Easy Listening chart until 1962, when it was renamed Middle-Road Singles. In 1964, the name changed again, this time to Pop-Standard Singles. After alternating the name of this chart twice more in less than a year, Easy Listening was again chosen as the chart name in 1965 when the change in compilation occurred. In April 1979, the Easy Listening chart officially became known as Adult Contemporary, and those two words have remained consistent in the name of the chart ever since.

In 1996, Billboard created a new chart called Adult Top 40, which reflects radio station programming that exists somewhere between "adult contemporary" music and "pop" music. Although they are sometimes mistaken for each other, the Adult Contemporary chart and the Adult Top 40 chart are separate charts, and songs reaching one chart might not reach the other. In addition, the term "hot AC" refers to another subgenre of radio programming that is distinct from the Adult Contemporary chart, despite the apparent similarity in name.

== Decades ==
=== The 1960s ===
In the early years of the Easy Listening chart, the top song on the chart was generally always a Top 10 pop hit as well. The method for compiling the chart at that time allowed some rock and roll artists, such as Lesley Gore and the Drifters, to make the chart on occasion with their softer or ballad releases, regardless of whether Easy Listening and middle of the road radio stations were actually playing those songs. In 1965, no No. 1 pop hits appeared on the Easy Listening chart. After 1965, differences between the Hot 100 chart and the Easy Listening chart became more pronounced. Better reflecting what middle of the road stations were actually playing, the composition of the chart changed dramatically. As rock music continued to harden, there was much less crossover between the Hot 100 and Easy Listening chart than there had been in the early half of the 1960s.

Several No. 1 Easy Listening hits of the late 1960s only "Bubbled Under" on the pop chart (for example, Andy Russell's 1967 version of "It's Such a Pretty World Today" that peaked at #119), or (as was the case with John Gary's 1967 hit "Cold") failed even to "Bubble Under." In 1967, only one single reached No. 1 on both charts – "Somethin' Stupid" by Frank Sinatra and Nancy Sinatra. This trend began to reverse by the end of the decade.

Notable artists with multiple No. 1 songs on this chart during the 1960s include Elvis Presley, Roy Orbison, Connie Francis, Dean Martin, Andy Williams, the 5th Dimension, and Glen Campbell. "Love Is Blue" by Paul Mauriat held the top of the Easy Listening chart for 11 weeks in 1968, which remained the longest stay at No. 1 until 1993.

=== The 1970s ===
The Hot 100 and Easy Listening charts became more similar again toward the end of the 1960s and into the early and mid-1970s, when the texture of much of the music played on Top 40 radio once more began to soften. Contemporary artists who recorded adult-appeal music, such as the Carpenters, Barbra Streisand, Barry Manilow, Anne Murray, John Denver, and Helen Reddy began to be played more often on Top 40 radio. Much of the music recorded by singer-songwriters such as James Taylor, Carole King, and Janis Ian got as much, if not more, airplay on this format than on Top 40 stations. A few of the acts that came of age as pop artists targeting younger audiences in the 1960s and early 1970s started moving toward easy listening as they matured (Neil Sedaka, Paul Anka and the Osmonds being prime examples). Easy Listening radio also began including songs by artists who had begun in other genres, such as rock and roll, R&B, or even country (it was during this time frame that a number of songs charted on the country and easy listening charts, often not on the Hot 100).

The longest stay at No. 1 on the Easy Listening chart in the 1970s was "Time Passages" by Al Stewart, which remained atop the chart for ten weeks. More common, however, was a high turnover rate at the summit of the Easy Listening survey during this decade. Over a three-year period from 1973 through 1975, there were 100 No. 1 songs on this chart, and most remained atop the chart for a single week. Among songs which topped both the Easy Listening (renamed Adult Contemporary in 1979) and pop charts in the 1970s were "(They Long to Be) Close to You" and "Please Mr. Postman" by the Carpenters, "Song Sung Blue" by Neil Diamond, "Annie's Song" by John Denver, "You Are the Sunshine of My Life" by Stevie Wonder, "I Honestly Love You" and "Have You Never Been Mellow" by Olivia Newton-John, "Love Will Keep Us Together" by Captain & Tennille, and "You Light Up My Life" by Debby Boone.

=== The 1980s ===
On August 21, 1982, the Adult Contemporary chart began ranking only airplay.

Some of the artists who achieved success on the adult contemporary chart in the 1980s were already established names, such as Elton John, Chicago, Barbra Streisand, Dan Fogelberg, Sheena Easton, Kenny Rogers, and Dionne Warwick, while newer acts such as Whitney Houston, Madonna, Air Supply, Lionel Richie, and Gloria Estefan also made an impact on the chart. The amount of crossover between the AC chart and the Hot 100 has varied based on how much the passing pop music trends of the times appealed to adult listeners. Not many disco or new wave songs were particularly successful on the AC chart during the late 1970s and early 1980s, and much of the hip-hop and harder rock music featured on CHR formats later in the decade would have been unacceptable on AC radio.

No song spent more than six weeks at No. 1 on this chart during the 1980s, with nine songs accomplishing that feat. Two were by Lionel Richie, "You Are" in 1983 and "Hello" in 1984, which also reached No. 1 on the Hot 100. Other songs reaching the summit on both the AC and pop charts were "Time After Time" by Cyndi Lauper, "I Just Called to Say I Love You" by Stevie Wonder, "Live to Tell" by Madonna, "I Just Can't Stop Loving You" by Michael Jackson (his only No. 1 on both charts), "Seasons Change" by Exposé, "Look Away" by Chicago, "Tell Her About It" by Billy Joel, and "Right Here Waiting" by Richard Marx.

=== The 1990s ===
With changes in methodology made to the Billboard Hot 100 chart in the early 1990s, many of the secondary charts began to experience differences as well. Certain songs achieved higher debut positions on the Hot 100 due to the new formulas used to calculate chart positions, and lengthy stays at number one became more common. This trend began to surface on the AC chart in 1993 after Billboard began using data received from Broadcast Data Systems as its measure for calculating the number of airplay songs on adult contemporary stations. Two consecutive singles ("The River of Dreams" by Billy Joel and "Said I Loved You...But I Lied" by Michael Bolton) logged twelve weeks apiece atop the AC chart, surpassing "Love Is Blue"'s previous mark of eleven weeks at number one. As the decade progressed, other songs had even longer stays at number one, including "Change the World" by Eric Clapton (13 weeks, 1996), "Un-Break My Heart" by Toni Braxton (14 weeks, 1997), "Because You Loved Me" by Celine Dion (19 weeks, 1996) and "You'll Be In My Heart" by Phil Collins (19 weeks, 1999).

In addition to Collins, who has had significant success on this chart, other artists with multiple number ones in the 1990s include Mariah Carey, Michael Bolton, Whitney Houston, and Shania Twain. Newer female singer-songwriters such as Sarah McLachlan, Natalie Merchant, Jewel, Melissa Etheridge, and Sheryl Crow also broke through on the AC chart during this time.

=== The 2000s and 2010s ===
A notable pattern that developed during the 2000s has been for certain pop songs to have lengthy runs on the Hot Adult Contemporary Tracks chart, even after the songs have fallen off the Hot 100. Songs such as "Love Story" and "You Belong with Me" by Taylor Swift, "Waiting on the World to Change" by John Mayer, "Love Song" by Sara Bareilles and "You're Beautiful" by James Blunt have remained on the AC chart for many weeks, in some cases over a year after the song was originally released. An article on MTV's website by Corey Moss describes this trend: "In other words, AC stations are where pop songs go to die a very long death. Or, to optimists, to get a second life." One theory states that many adult contemporary stations play less newer music because they also give ample airtime to hits of the past, so the de-emphasis on new songs slows the progression of the AC chart. Also, certain program directors have asserted that AC is a song-based format, as opposed to other radio formats that are infused with singer-based programming, so there is no guarantee that a new single by a certain artist will appeal to the listeners.

The record for most time atop the Adult Contemporary chart is 57 non-consecutive weeks, achieved by Miley Cyrus with her 2023 release, "Flowers". A number of other songs have logged more than 20 weeks apiece at the summit; The 2003, Uncle Kracker's collaboration with Dobie Gray on Gray's own 1973 hit, Drift Away spent 28 weeks at No. 1. Ed Sheeran's "Shape of You" from 2017 has logged 24 weeks at No. 1 on the AC chart. In addition, Celine Dion's "A New Day Has Come" from 2002 and Kelly Clarkson's 2004 song "Breakaway". Both songs spent 21 weeks at No. 1 on the AC chart.

Through 2022, Celine Dion has logged 87 weeks atop the AC chart, which is the most for any artist; Adele has moved into second place with 83 weeks, Ed Sheeran holds third place and the most for a solo male artist with 67 weeks, followed by Elton John with 63 weeks. Maroon 5 is the current top group, and fifth overall, with 62 weeks. Elton John also has the most chart-toppers on this survey with 18, while the Carpenters hold the record for the most chart toppers among groups with 15, and Celine Dion has the most #1's among female artists with 11.

In 2011, Billboard announced the top 100 performing songs on the AC chart and the top 50 performing artists to celebrate the 50th anniversary on the chart. The top song on the list was "Truly Madly Deeply" by Savage Garden, which hit number one for 11 weeks in 1998, spent a total of 58 weeks in the top 10, and spent 123 weeks on the chart. That chart longevity would only be passed by another one of their songs, "I Knew I Loved You" (which ranked at #21 on that list), from their album Affirmation. Elton John was nominated the top performing AC artist through that time, and also holds the record for the most No. 1 AC singles, top 10 singles, and singles on the chart. His song "The One" was ranked on No. 53 on the top 100 performing songs on the AC chart.

== Other formats ==
Relatively few urban contemporary and hip-hop artists manage to successfully cross over to AC, although there were a few exceptions in the later part of the 2000s decade, such as Beyoncé's "Irreplaceable", Fergie's ballad "Big Girls Don't Cry", Gnarls Barkley's "Crazy", Rihanna's "Take a Bow", and Timbaland's remix of OneRepublic's "Apologize". R&B artists who have achieved major success on the AC chart in the past include Dionne Warwick, Aaron Neville, Diana Ross (with her solo career), James Ingram, Lionel Richie, Whitney Houston and Mariah Carey.

Crossover from the country charts has also been common on the AC chart since the chart began. Among the country stars who had a number of singles cross over to the AC chart (and the pop chart as well) from the 1960s through the 1980s included Brenda Lee, Ray Price, Patsy Cline, Johnny Cash, Anne Murray, Ronnie Milsap, Barbara Mandrell, Dolly Parton, Kenny Rogers, Eddie Rabbitt, Crystal Gayle, Willie Nelson, and Juice Newton. The huge growth of country music as a radio format in the 1990s brought a number of new country crossovers onto the AC airwaves, including Martina McBride, Wynonna Judd, LeAnn Rimes, Shania Twain, Billy Joel, Lonestar, Mary Chapin Carpenter, and Garth Brooks. More recently, a new wave of country performers has been crossing over to AC, including Tim McGraw, the Dixie Chicks (who topped the AC chart with their cover of Fleetwood Mac's "Landslide"), Rascal Flatts, Keith Urban, Carrie Underwood, Taylor Swift, Sugarland, Lady Antebellum, Jason Aldean (whose AC success came by way of his duet with Kelly Clarkson, "Don't You Wanna Stay"), The Band Perry, Sam Hunt, and Dan + Shay.

Contemporary Christian music has also been relatively successful in crossing over to mainstream radio. In the mid-1980s, the most successful CCM artist at the time, Amy Grant, crossed over into secular music with the 1985 single "Find a Way", which became a Top Ten AC hit and a No. 1 Christian single simultaneously. In the 1990s and into the 2000s, other artists such as Lifehouse, MercyMe, Natalie Grant, Kathy Troccoli, Sixpence None the Richer, Steven Curtis Chapman, and Michael W. Smith have crossed in between the Christian and secular worlds with little disapproval from their fan bases.

Many notable classic rock artists have also crossed over to the adult contemporary chart as well by way of releasing power ballads. Artists such as Journey, Foreigner, Pat Benatar, and John Mellencamp among many other artists have had AC chart hits in addition to charting on the Mainstream Rock chart. In addition, newer recordings by established classic rock artists have also gotten some airplay on adult contemporary stations. Heart, Bob Seger, and Elton John are just some of the artists to have some of their 21st-century songs played on adult contemporary.

In addition, some classic rock artists whose songs did not chart on the adult contemporary chart during their initial heyday have been played on AC stations in recent years: Whitesnake with Here I Go Again, Joan Jett with I Love Rock and Roll, and Def Leppard with Pour Some Sugar on Me among other artists. (Note: Whitesnake's and Def Leppard's songs "Is This Love" and "Two Steps Behind" did hit the charts, their sole adult contemporary charting songs. Joan Jett had no adult contemporary charting songs until 2022's "(I'm Gonna) Run Away".)

== Recurrents ==
The Adult Contemporary Recurrent charts ranks airplay from the adult contemporary radio stations in the United States chart that have reached recurrent criteria. Descending songs are moved to recurrent status based upon the following three-tiered system: if they rank below the top five after 52 weeks, if they rank below the top 10 after 26 weeks, or if they rank below the top 15 after 20 weeks.

Exceptions are sometimes made, usually on a case-by-case basis. Occasionally an older song is re-released (for example, featured on a current movie soundtrack and given a renewed promotional push from a record label) or a song can take an extended amount of time to climb to position fifteen. Billboard chart managers ultimately make the decision about which songs can remain on the current chart in such cases.

== Records and achievements ==
=== The top 10 adult contemporary songs (1961–2011) ===
Rank	Single	Year released	Artist(s)	Peak and duration
1	"Truly Madly Deeply"	1997	Savage Garden	#1 for 11 weeks
2	"Lead Me On"	1978	Maxine Nightingale	#1 for 7 weeks
3	"Drift Away"	2003	Uncle Kracker featuring Dobie Gray	#1 for 28 weeks
4	"Heaven"	2004	Los Lonely Boys	#1 for 18 weeks
5	"Born Free"	1966	Roger Williams	#1 for 6 weeks
6	"Hello Dolly!"	1964	Louis Armstrong and The All Stars	#1 for 9 weeks
7	"You Needed Me"	1978	Anne Murray	#3 for 3 weeks
8	"Change the World"	1996	Eric Clapton	#1 for 13 weeks
9	"Hero"	2001	Enrique Iglesias	#1 for 15 weeks
10	"Lonely No More"	2005	Rob Thomas	#1 for 18 weeks

=== The top 10 adult contemporary artists (1961–2011) ===
Rank	Artist
1	Elton John
2	Neil Diamond
3	Barbra Streisand
4	Barry Manilow
5	Kenny Rogers
6	Chicago
7	Billy Joel
8	Carpenters
9	Lionel Richie
10	Anne Murray

=== Songs with most weeks at number one ===
These are the songs with 20 or more weeks at number one as of the chart dated November 21, 2026.

Weeks at No. 1	Song	Artist	Issue date reached No. 1	Source
57	"Flowers"	Miley Cyrus	April 15, 2023	
55	"Ordinary"	Alex Warren	October 25, 2025	
49	"Lose Control"	Teddy Swims	August 10, 2024	
36	"Girls Like You"	Maroon 5	November 10, 2018	
35	"Blinding Lights"	The Weeknd	November 7, 2020	
28	"Drift Away"	Uncle Kracker featuring Dobie Gray	June 7, 2003	
24	"Shape of You"	Ed Sheeran	May 6, 2017	
24	"Easy on Me"	Adele	November 13, 2021	
22	"Hey, Soul Sister"	Train	July 3, 2010	
22	"Perfect"	Ed Sheeran	February 24, 2018	
21	"A New Day Has Come"	Celine Dion	March 30, 2002	
21	"Breakaway"	Kelly Clarkson	March 12, 2005	
21	"Hello"	Adele	November 28, 2015	
20	"Just the Way You Are"	Bruno Mars	February 5, 2011	
20	"Memories"	Maroon 5	March 21, 2020	

=== Artists with most number-one songs ===
Songs	Artist	Source
18	Elton John	
15	The Carpenters	
13	Barry Manilow	
11	Celine Dion	
11	Lionel Richie	
10	Olivia Newton-John	
10	Whitney Houston	
9	John Denver	
9	Taylor Swift	
8	Anne Murray	
8	Chicago	
8	Neil Diamond	
8	Phil Collins	
8	Stevie Wonder	

=== Artists with most cumulative weeks at number one ===
Weeks	Artist	Source
87	Celine Dion	
83	Adele	
72	Miley Cyrus	
67	Ed Sheeran	
64	Elton John	
62	Maroon 5	
56	Taylor Swift	
55	Alex Warren	
49	Teddy Swims	
47	Lionel Richie	

=== Artists with most top 10 songs ===
Songs	Artist	Source
42	Elton John	
38	Neil Diamond	
35	Barbra Streisand	
31	Elvis Presley	
29	Dionne Warwick	
28	Barry Manilow	
28	Kenny Rogers	
26	Whitney Houston	
24	Billy Joel	
24	Chicago	
24	James Taylor	
24	Bobby Vinton	

=== Artists with most chart entries ===
Entries	Artist	Source
77	Elton John	
64	Barbra Streisand	
58	Neil Diamond	
53	Barry Manilow	
53	Taylor Swift	
50	Johnny Mathis	
48	Elvis Presley	
48	Kenny Rogers	
44	Dionne Warwick	
43	Celine Dion	

== See also ==
- Adult contemporary music
- List of artists who reached number one on the U.S. Adult Contemporary chart
- List of Billboard number-one adult contemporary hits
