= List of Billboard number-one country songs of 2023 =

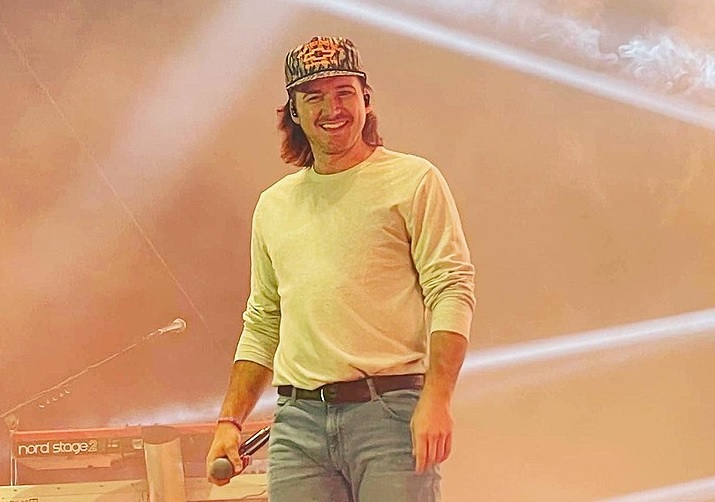
Morgan Wallen's "Last Night" spent 25 weeks at number one on the Hot Country Songs chart and also topped the all-genre Hot 100, the first song by a solo male country singer to do so since 1981.

Hot Country Songs and Country Airplay are charts that rank the top-performing country songs in the United States, published by Billboard magazine. Hot Country Songs ranks songs based on digital downloads, streaming, and airplay from stations of all formats, a methodology introduced in 2012. Country Airplay, which was first published in 2012, is based solely on country radio airplay, a methodology that had previously been used from 1990 to 2012 for Hot Country Songs. In 2023, 6 different songs topped the Hot Country Songs chart and 20 different songs topped Country Airplay in 52 issues of the magazine.

In the issue dated January 7, 2023, "You Proof" by Morgan Wallen was at number one on Country Airplay, the song's tenth week in the top spot, extending a record set the previous week for the longest-running number-one single based strictly off country radio rotation. Zach Bryan's "Something in the Orange" was the year's first number one on Hot Country Songs; topping the chart in its 36th week on the listing, it gave the singer his first number-one country single. A week later, Jelly Roll achieved the same feat when he topped the Country Airplay chart with "Son of a Sinner", and Nate Smith did the same in February with "Whiskey on You". Later in February, Katelyn Brown achieved her first number one as a featured artist on her husband Kane Brown's "Thank God". The track was the second duet by a married couple to top a chart based on country radio airplay, following Tim McGraw and Faith Hill's "It's Your Love" in 1997. In August, Oliver Anthony entered the Hot Country Songs listing at number one with "Rich Men North of Richmond" (credited to "Oliver Anthony Music"), his first song to enter any of Billboard's charts. In September, Kacey Musgraves scored her first number one country single as a featured artist on Bryan's "I Remember Everything", which topped Hot Country Songs.

Wallen had the year's most country number ones, having had four songs top one or both charts. Other acts to achieve more than one number one during 2023 include Jelly Roll and Luke Combs, who each had three chart-toppers, and Bryan, Smith, Kane Brown, Bailey Zimmerman, and Lainey Wilson, with two each. In July, Combs reached number one on Country Airplay with a rendition of Tracy Chapman's 1988 song "Fast Car", the first cover of a pop single to top a Billboard chart based on plays on country music radio since Blake Shelton's version of Michael Bublé's "Home" topped Hot Country Songs in 2008. Additionally, it made Chapman the first black woman to solely compose a country number one. Wallen spent the most total weeks at number one on both listings, with 25 on Hot Country Songs and 17 on Country Airplay. His track "Last Night" had the year's longest unbroken run in the top spot of both charts, with 23 weeks at number one on Hot Country Songs and eight weeks atop Country Airplay. It also topped the magazine's all-genre chart, the Hot 100, the first song by a solo male country singer to do so since 1981. "Try That in a Small Town" by Jason Aldean topped both Hot Country Songs and the Hot 100 in July when its sales increased dramatically following controversy around its music video, and another song which was considered controversial by the media, "Rich Men North of Richmond", achieved the same feat in August. "I Remember Everything" became the fourth song of 2023 to top both listings in September.

== Chart history ==
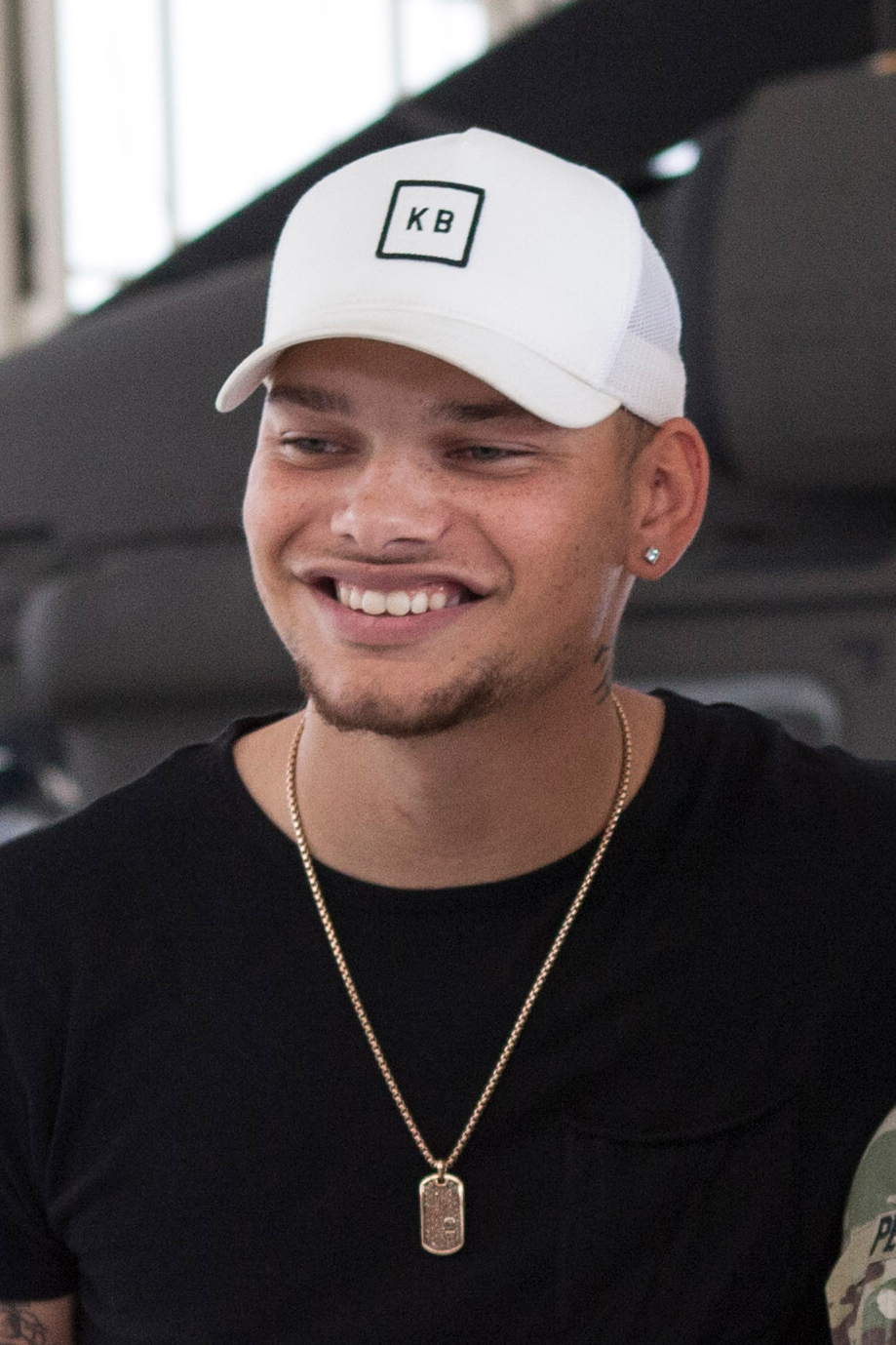
Kane Brown collaborated with his wife Katelyn on the Country Airplay number one "Thank God".

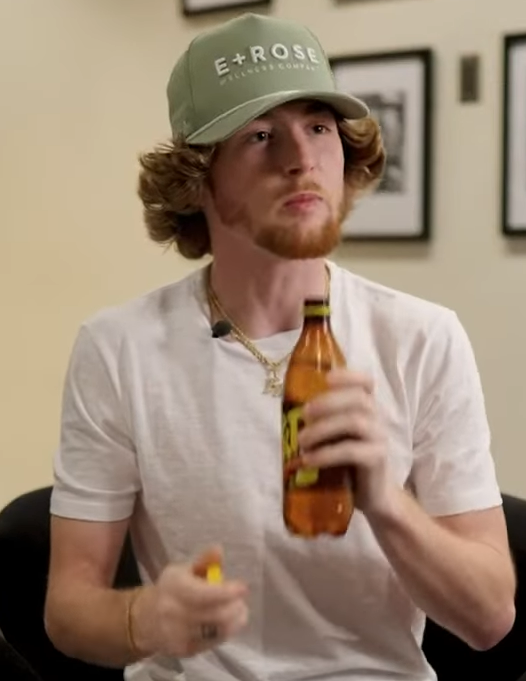
Bailey Zimmerman topped the Country Airplay chart for six weeks with "Rock and a Hard Place" and returned to number one later in the year with "Religiously".

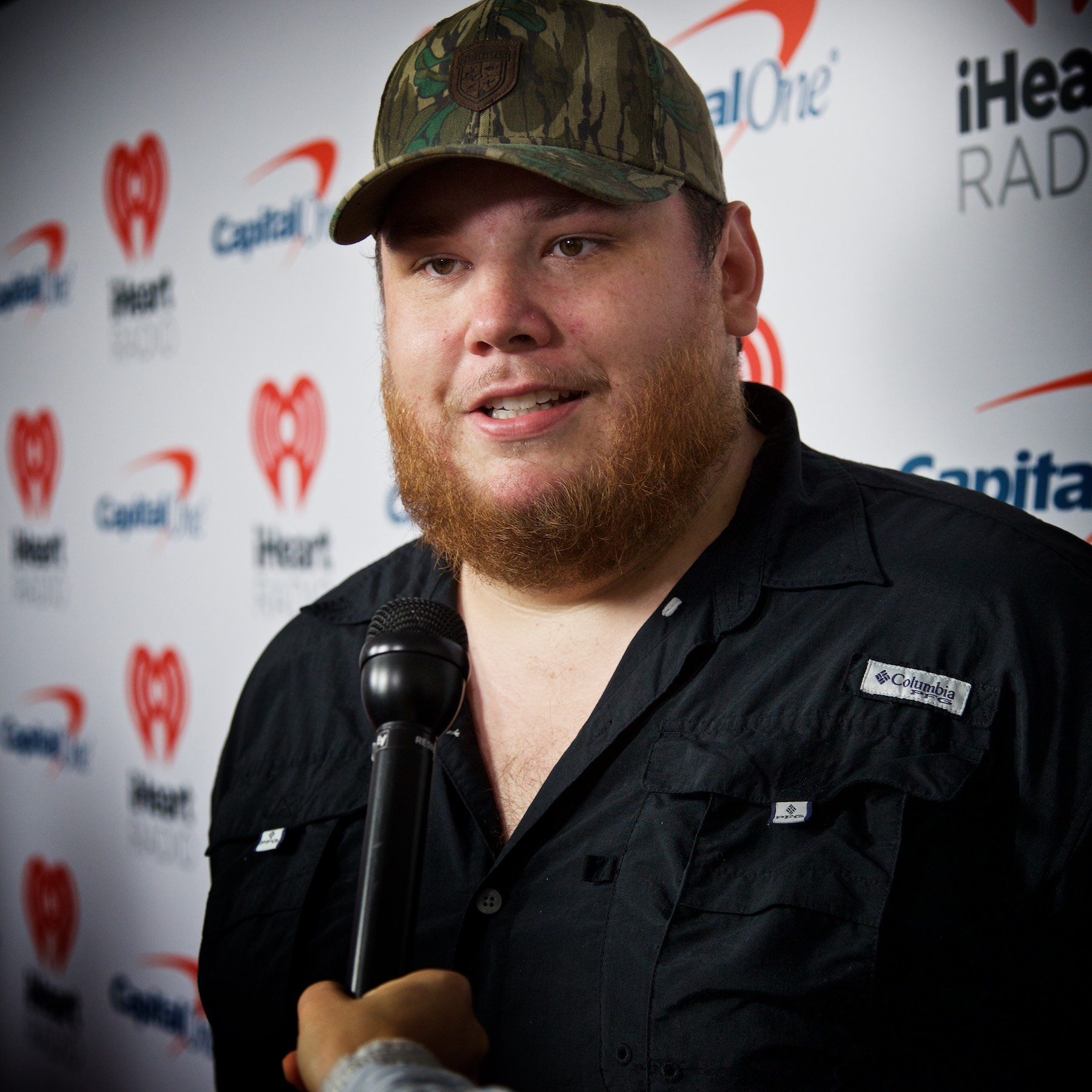
Three songs by Luke Combs spent a total of eight weeks at number one on the Country Airplay chart.

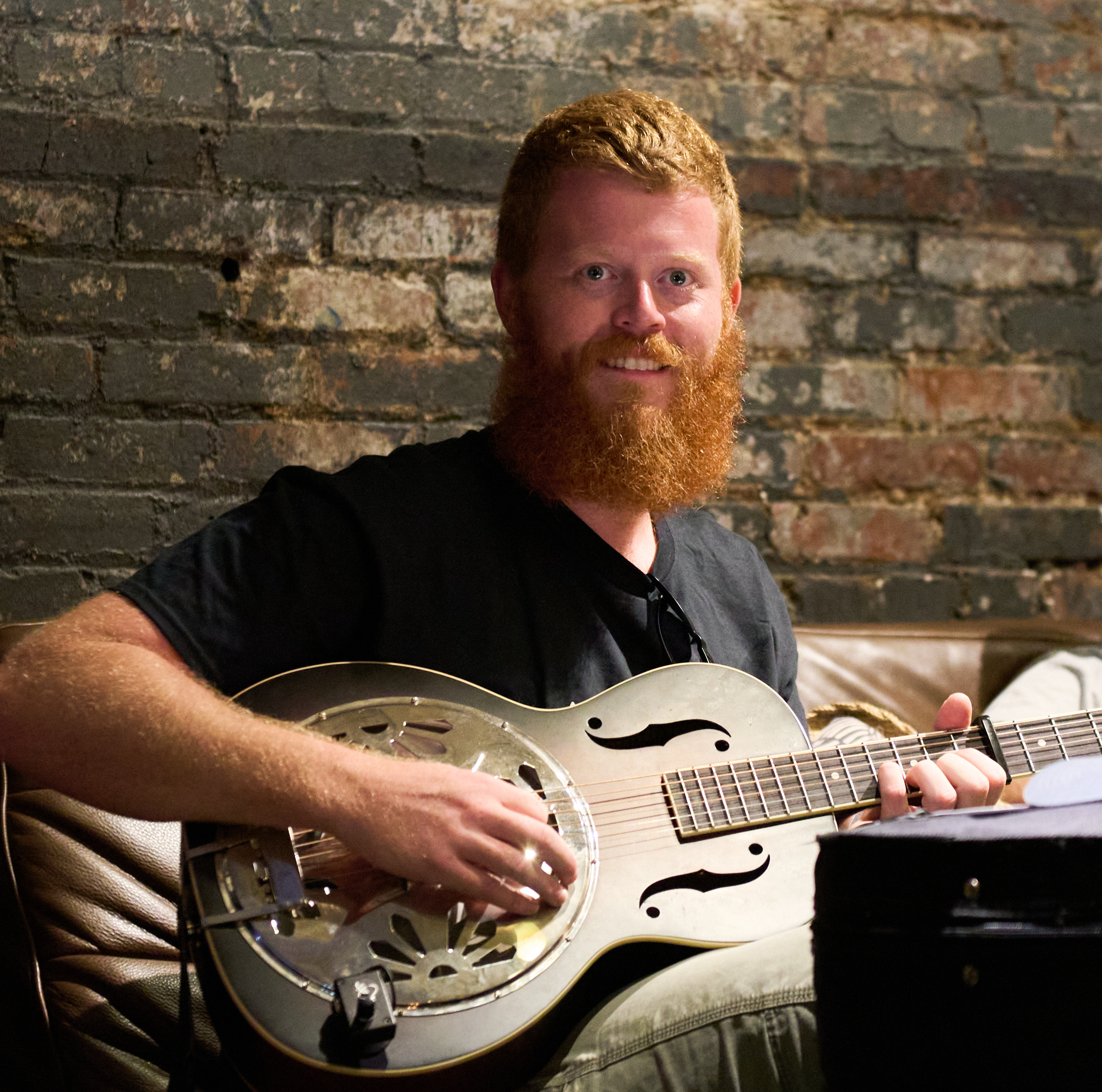
Oliver Anthony entered both Hot Country Songs and the Hot 100 at number one with "Rich Men North of Richmond" despite having no previous chart history at all.

Chart history
Issue date	Hot Country Songs			Country Airplay		
Issue date	Title	Artist(s)	Ref.	Title	Artist(s)	Ref.
January 7	"Something in the Orange"	Zach Bryan		"You Proof"	Morgan Wallen	
January 14	"Something in the Orange"	Zach Bryan		"Son of a Sinner"	Jelly Roll	
January 21	"Something in the Orange"	Zach Bryan		"What My World Spins Around"	Jordan Davis	
January 28	"Something in the Orange"	Zach Bryan		"What My World Spins Around"	Jordan Davis	
February 4	"Something in the Orange"	Zach Bryan		"Whiskey on You"	Nate Smith	
February 11	"Something in the Orange"	Zach Bryan		"Whiskey on You"	Nate Smith	
February 18	"Last Night"	Morgan Wallen		"Thank God"	Kane Brown and Katelyn Brown	
February 25	"Last Night"	Morgan Wallen		"Thought You Should Know"	Morgan Wallen	
March 4	"Last Night"	Morgan Wallen		"Thought You Should Know"	Morgan Wallen	
March 11	"Last Night"	Morgan Wallen		"Thought You Should Know"	Morgan Wallen	
March 18	"Last Night"	Morgan Wallen		"Going, Going, Gone"	Luke Combs	
March 25	"Last Night"	Morgan Wallen		"Going, Going, Gone"	Luke Combs	
April 1	"Last Night"	Morgan Wallen		"Rock and a Hard Place"	Bailey Zimmerman	
April 8	"Last Night"	Morgan Wallen		"Rock and a Hard Place"	Bailey Zimmerman	
April 15	"Last Night"	Morgan Wallen		"Rock and a Hard Place"	Bailey Zimmerman	
April 22	"Last Night"	Morgan Wallen		"Rock and a Hard Place"	Bailey Zimmerman	
April 29	"Last Night"	Morgan Wallen		"Rock and a Hard Place"	Bailey Zimmerman	
May 6	"Last Night"	Morgan Wallen		"Rock and a Hard Place"	Bailey Zimmerman	
May 13	"Last Night"	Morgan Wallen		"Last Night"	Morgan Wallen	
May 20	"Last Night"	Morgan Wallen		"Last Night"	Morgan Wallen	
May 27	"Last Night"	Morgan Wallen		"Last Night"	Morgan Wallen	
June 3	"Last Night"	Morgan Wallen		"Last Night"	Morgan Wallen	
June 10	"Last Night"	Morgan Wallen		"Last Night"	Morgan Wallen	
June 17	"Last Night"	Morgan Wallen		"Last Night"	Morgan Wallen	
June 24	"Last Night"	Morgan Wallen		"Last Night"	Morgan Wallen	
July 1	"Last Night"	Morgan Wallen		"Last Night"	Morgan Wallen	
July 8	"Last Night"	Morgan Wallen		"Fast Car"	Luke Combs	
July 15	"Last Night"	Morgan Wallen		"Fast Car"	Luke Combs	
July 22	"Last Night"	Morgan Wallen		"Fast Car"	Luke Combs	
July 29	"Try That in a Small Town"	Jason Aldean		"Fast Car"	Luke Combs	
August 5	"Try That in a Small Town"	Jason Aldean		"Fast Car"	Luke Combs	
August 12	"Last Night"	Morgan Wallen		"Need a Favor"	Jelly Roll	
August 19	"Last Night"	Morgan Wallen		"Need a Favor"	Jelly Roll	
August 26	"Rich Men North of Richmond"	Oliver Anthony Music		"Need a Favor"	Jelly Roll	
September 2	"Rich Men North of Richmond"	Oliver Anthony Music		"Need a Favor"	Jelly Roll	
September 9	"I Remember Everything"	Zach Bryan featuring Kacey Musgraves		"Love You Anyway"	Luke Combs	
September 16	"I Remember Everything"	Zach Bryan featuring Kacey Musgraves		"Bury Me in Georgia"	Kane Brown	
September 23	"I Remember Everything"	Zach Bryan featuring Kacey Musgraves		"Angels Don't Always Have Wings"	Thomas Rhett	
September 30	"Fast Car"	Luke Combs		"Religiously"	Bailey Zimmerman	
October 7	"Fast Car"	Luke Combs		"Watermelon Moonshine"	Lainey Wilson	
October 14	"Fast Car"	Luke Combs		"Watermelon Moonshine"	Lainey Wilson	
October 21	"Fast Car"	Luke Combs		"Watermelon Moonshine"	Lainey Wilson	
October 28	"I Remember Everything"	Zach Bryan featuring Kacey Musgraves		"Thinkin' Bout Me"	Morgan Wallen	
November 4	"I Remember Everything"	Zach Bryan featuring Kacey Musgraves		"Thinkin' Bout Me"	Morgan Wallen	
November 11	"I Remember Everything"	Zach Bryan featuring Kacey Musgraves		"Thinkin' Bout Me"	Morgan Wallen	
November 18	"I Remember Everything"	Zach Bryan featuring Kacey Musgraves		"Thinkin' Bout Me"	Morgan Wallen	
November 25	"I Remember Everything"	Zach Bryan featuring Kacey Musgraves		"Thinkin' Bout Me"	Morgan Wallen	
December 2	"I Remember Everything"	Zach Bryan featuring Kacey Musgraves		"Can't Have Mine"	Dylan Scott	
December 9	"I Remember Everything"	Zach Bryan featuring Kacey Musgraves		"Save Me"	Jelly Roll with Lainey Wilson	
December 16	"I Remember Everything"	Zach Bryan featuring Kacey Musgraves		"Save Me"	Jelly Roll with Lainey Wilson	
December 23	"I Remember Everything"	Zach Bryan featuring Kacey Musgraves		"World on Fire"	Nate Smith	
December 30	"I Remember Everything"	Zach Bryan featuring Kacey Musgraves		"World on Fire"	Nate Smith	

== See also ==
- 2023 in country music
- List of artists who reached number one on the U.S. Hot Country chart
- List of number-one country singles of 2023 (Canada)
- List of Top Country Albums number ones of 2023
