= Ben Johnson (songwriter) =

American songwriter and producer

- Born: Meridian, Mississippi, United States
- Genres: Country; rock
- Occupations: Songwriter, record producer
- Instruments: Piano, guitar, cello
- Years active: 2013–present
- Label: Tape Room Music/APG/Runner Music
- Spouse: Lauren Conklin
- Website: theonlybenjohnson.com

Ben Johnson is an American songwriter, producer, and artist. His notable hits include "One of Them Girls," "Truck Bed," "All the Way," which reached No. 1 on the Billboard Hot Country Songs chart and peaked at No. 4 on the Billboard Hot 100, and "All My Favorite Songs," which was nominated for Grammy Award for Best Rock Song" at the 64th Annual Grammy Awards. He has written for artists such as Morgan Wallen, Jelly Roll, Charlie Puth, Hardy, Justin Timberlake, Lee Brice, Dierks Bentley, John Legend, Ava Max, and Weezer.

== Early life and education ==
Ben Johnson grew up in Meridian, Mississippi, where he lived until moving to Nashville with his sisters in 2012 to pursue a music career. He began piano lessons at age six with his grandmother, developing his own style by altering compositions, which sparked his interest in songwriting. Influenced by The Beatles and Jimmie Rodgers, the "Father of Country Music," he and his sisters performed traditional and bluegrass music in church and at festivals, honing their skills. They gained recognition by reaching the Hollywood rounds of The X Factor in 2011, receiving praise from Simon Cowell and Paula Abdul.

After relocating to Nashville, Johnson and his sisters established a daily songwriting routine alongside their studies and side jobs, cultivating a reputation and connections with some of the city's most prominent songwriters. He attended Belmont University on a cello scholarship. He is a multi-instrumentalist.

== Career ==
Johnson has achieved eleven No. 1 singles, including "Bulletproof" by Nate Smith, "Gone" by Dierks Bentley, "Take My Name" by Parmalee (which was recognized as Billboard’s Country Song of the Year), and "New Truck" by Dylan Scott. He wrote the 2021 song "Believe," performed by Meek Mill and Justin Timberlake, which landed on the Billboard Hot 100, Rolling Stone Top 100, and Billboard Hot R&B/Hip-Hop charts. His co-written song "One of Them Girls," performed by Lee Brice, won the Country Song of the Year award in 2021 across ASCAP, BMI, and SESAC. The song was named song of the year by the Nashville chapter of the Association of Independent Music Publishers. It topped Billboard’s Country Airplay chart for three weeks, and reached No. 2 on Hot Country Songs.

At the 64th Annual Grammy Awards in 2022, Johnson received a nomination for Grammy Award for Best Rock Song" for the Weezer #1 Rock Airplay song "All My Favorite Songs." That year, he was also honored at the CMA Triple Play Awards. "Give Heaven Some Hell," performed by Hardy and co-written by Johnson was honored at the 2023 Nashville Songwriter Awards. "Bulletproof," performed by Nate Smith and co-written by Johnson was nominated for Male Song of The Year at the 2024 People's Choice Country Awards.

In August 2024, it was announced that Johnson was collaborating with Hardy and David Alan Johnson to produce the docuseries Music Row, which would provide an in-depth look at Nashville's music industry and the creative community behind country music. As of August 2024, Johnson held a worldwide co-publishing deal with Tape Room Music/APG/Runner Music.

In 2025, Johnson appeared on the Netflix music docu-reality series Hitmakers. In an interview about the show, Johnson spoke about being the "country guy" on the show and discussed how he met Hardy, who he has collaborated with extensively.

== Personal life ==
In 2016, Johnson married Lauren Conklin, whom he met as a 13-year-old at middle-school orchestra camp at Belmont University.

== Discography ==
Title	Year	Album name	Artist Name(s)
"Mission Control Club"	2015	–	Banditz, Adara
"Open Eyes"	2016	–	Adara, Estiva
"Patient"	2018	Voicenotes	Charlie Puth
"Our World"	2018	–	Smithfield
"Waves"	2019	–	Hunter Phelps
"Take Me to Heaven"	2019	–	Hunter Phelps
"You Don't Want Me"	2019	–	Hunter Phelps
"Throwin' Parties"	2019	–	Hunter Phelps
"Last Night All Day"	2019	–	Sean Stemaly
"One More Time"	2020	–	Willie Morrison
"Believe"	2020	–	Meek Mill, Justin Timberlake
"Gone"	2020		Dierks Bentley
"Good Ol' Boys"	2020	Hey World	Lee Brice
"One of Them Girls"	2020	Hey World	Lee Brice
"Seen You In Your Hometown"	2020	Getting Over Him	Lauren Alaina
"Going Going Gone"	2020	Name On It EP	Ryan Griffin
"Truck"	2020	A Rock	Hardy
"Give Heaven Some Hell"	2020	A Rock	Hardy
"On Me"	2020	SCOOB!	Thomas Rhett, Kane Brown, Ava Max
"Dying Man"	2020	One Thing at a Time	Morgan Wallen
"Take My Name"	2021	For You	Parmalee
"Heartbreak Girl"	2021	-	Willie Morrison
"Beers on Me"	2021	-	Dierks Bentley, Breland, Hardy
"Best Thing Since Backroads"	2021	-	Jake Owen
"Another Life"	2021	Another Life	Surf Mesa, Joshua Golden, Fletcher
"All My Favorite Songs"	2021	–	Weezer, AJR
"Shoulda"	2021	Shoulda	Kylie Morgan
"Break Up In A Bar"	2021	Love Talking	Eli Young Band
"Run"	2021	Sitting Pretty on Top of the World	Lauren Alaina
"Sing Along Drink Along"	2021	The Country and the Coast: Side A	Morgan Evans
"American Dream Truck"	2021	The Country and the Coast: Side A	Morgan Evans
"Country Outta My Girl"	2021	The Country and the Coast: Side A	Morgan Evans, Rivers Cuomo
"Cheating On You"	2021	Love, Kylie	Kylie Morgan
"Outdoor Voices"	2021	Love, Kylie	Kylie Morgan
"Die Under The Moon"	2021	Moon Boy	Yung Bleu, John Legend
"Little Bit More"	2021	Big Dreams	Track45
"Met Me Now"	2021	Big Dreams	Track45
"Come On In"	2021	Big Dreams	Track45
"Me + You"	2021	Big Dreams	Track45
"Hot Beer"	2021	Son of A	Dillon Carmichael
"Breakin' In"	2021	Stronger Than I Am	Lily Rose
"Family"	2021	-	David Guetta, Bebe Rexha, Ty Dolla $ign, A Boogie Wit da Hoodie
"A LOT"	2022	-	John K
"Holy Water"	2022	-	Michael Ray
"New Truck"	2022	Livin' My Best Life	Dylan Scott
"Static"	2022	Livin' My Best Life	Dylan Scott
"Last Night All Day"	2022	Product of a Small Town	Sean Stemaly
"Break Up In A Bar"	2022	Love Talking	Eli Young Band
"Hurt No More"	2022	LETTING GO	Chase Wright
"If He Wanted to He Would"	2022	Making It Up As I Go	Kylie Morgan
"Better In A Car"	2022	–	Roman Alexander
"Holy Water"	2022	–	Michael Ray
"11 Beers"	2022	Good Ol' Days	The Reklaws, Jake Owen
"Family"	2022	Family	Track45
"Brave Girl"	2022	Real To Me: The Way I Feel	Callista Clark
"Always Been You"	2022	Songs To Say I Do	Kylie Morgan
"Good Hands"	2022	Songs To Say I Do	Kylie Morgan
"Try Jesus"	2022	Come Get Your Wife	Elle King
"Sorry"	2022	Russel Dickerson	Russel Dickerson
"Big Wheels"	2022	Russel Dickerson	Russel Dickerson
"Dancing in the Dark"	2022	Pinto	Sykamore
"On The Water"	2023	-	James Barker Band, Dalton Dover
"Sad in the Summer"	2023	Diplo Presents Thomas Wesley: Chapter 2 – Swamp Savant	Diplo, Lily Rose
"Beer"	2023	The Mockingbird & the Crow	Hardy
"Truck Bed"	2023	The Mockingbird & the Crow	Hardy
"Sorry Momma"	2023	I Hate Cowboys & All Dogs Go To Hell	Chase Rice
"Dying Man"	2023	One Thing at a Time	Morgan Wallen, Hardy
"In The Bible"	2023	One Thing at a Time	Morgan Wallen, Hardy
"Single Than She Was"	2023	One Thing at a Time	Morgan Wallen, Hardy
"Hate Me"	2023	Hate Me	Track45
"Two Night Stands"	2023	Two Night Stands	Kylie Morgan
"Leave Me Alone"	2023	Keepin' The Lights On	Tyler Hubbard
"Solo Solo"	2023	–	Jake Owen
"Boyfriend"	2023	For You 2	Parmalee
"Is It Just Me"	2023	For You 2	Parmalee
"That'll Be the Day"	2023	-	Jacob Bryant
"When I Grow Up"	2023	-	Track45
"Last Man In Tennessee"	2023	Grew Up On – EP	Track45
"Grew Up On"	2023	Grew Up On – EP	Track45
"Drinkin and Thinkin"	2023	Grew Up On – EP	Track45
"Pch"	2023	Grew Up On – EP	Track45
"Honky Tonk Heartbreaker"	2023	Killed the Cowboy	Dustin Lynch
"Listen To The Radio"	2023	Killed the Cowboy	Dustin Lynch
"Beauty and the Beach"	2023	Three Months Two Streets Down	Russell Dickerson
"This Side Of The Dirt"	2023	–	Neon Union
"No California"	2023	–	Ilsey Juber
"Happy Ever After Me"	2023	Making It Up As I Go	Kylie Morgan
"Blacktop Don't"	2023	–	Boomtown Saints
"Somebody Else's Truck"	2023	Come Get Your Memory	Chase Matthew
"Bulletproof"	2024	Through the Smoke	Nate Smith, Avril Lavigne
"Here's To Hometowns"	2024	Through the Smoke	Nate Smith
"Make It With You"	2024	Through the Smoke	Nate Smith, The War and Treaty
"By Tomorrow"	2024	Words	Shawn Austin
"Man Down"	2024	Life With You	Kelsey Hart
"Put It On The Map"	2024	Life With You	Kelsey Hart
"Here And Her"	2024	Roads That Go Nowhere	Travis Denning
"zombieland"	2024	Dear Joe,	Jax, Hardy
"On My Way Out"	2024	Keepin' The Lights On	Kameron Marlowe
"Lock Me Up"	2024	Keepin' The Lights On	Kameron Marlowe
"What A Woman"	2024	-	Faouzia
"Didn't I?"	2024	-	Dasha
"Tear Us Apart"	2024	Twisters: The Album	Sam Barber
"Steal My Thunder"	2024	Twisters: The Album	Conner Smith, Tucker Wetmore
"What A Life"	2024	Bones The EP	Russell Dickerson
"Liar"	2024	Beautifully Broken (Pickin' Up The Pieces)	Jelly Roll
"Smile So Much"	2024	Beautifully Broken (Pickin' Up The Pieces)	Jelly Roll
"Guilty"	2024	Beautifully Broken (Pickin' Up The Pieces)	Jelly Roll
"Grace"	2024	Beautifully Broken (Pickin' Up The Pieces)	Jelly Roll
"Devil Down"	2024	Beautifully Broken (Pickin' Up The Pieces)	Jelly Roll
"WHYBMWL"	2024	Quit!!	Hardy
"Blame It On My Broken Heart"	2024	Breakup Over Breakfast	Avery Anna
"Fish On The Wall"	2024	Mind of a Country Boy	Luke Bryan
"Dance With You"	2024	About A Woman (& A Good Ol' Boy)	Thomas Rhett
"All The Way"	2025	–	BigXthaPlug
"Nobody Likes Your Girlfriend"	2025	–	Nate Smith, Hardy
"Bar None"	2025	Learn the Hard Way	Jordan Davis
"Hey California"	2025	Honkytonk Hollywood	Jon Pardi
"The Bend"	2025	–	Noah Rinker
"Hard No"	2025	–	WHYNOT, Vwillz
"Luckiest Man Alive"	2025	Country!	Hardy
"All My Exes"	2025	Stages	Lauren Alaina, Chase Matthew
"Heaven Sent"	2025	Stages	Lauren Alaina
"Forget Tonight"	2025	HiROQUEST 3: Paragon	Steve Aoki, Tyler Hubbard
"Easy To Love"	2025	–	Dustin Lynch
"Georgia (Ain’t On Her Mind)"	2025	Spanish Moss	Cole Swindell
"At The Same Time"		Different Night Same Rodeo	Bailey Zimmerman
