= California Gold (album) =

Studio album by Nate Smith
- Released: October 4, 2024
- Length: 51:10
- Label: Sony
- Producer: Joel Bruyere; Lalo Guzman; Alessandro Lindblad; Lindsay Rimes; Zachary Skelton

Nate Smith chronology
Through the Smoke (2024)	California Gold (2024)

Singles from California Gold
- 1. "Bulletproof" Released: February 19, 2024; 2. "I Like It" Released: July 12, 2024; 3. "Fix What You Didn't Break" Released: October 28, 2024

California Gold is the second studio album by American country music singer Nate Smith, released on October 4, 2024, through Sony.

== Background ==
Smith's self-titled debut studio album was released in April 2023 through Arista Nashville, producing two number one singles on the US Country Airplay chart: "Whiskey on You" and "World on Fire". The album reached a peak position of number 30 on the Billboard 200 and was certified Gold by the Recording Industry Association of America. Following the closure of Arista Nashville in March 2023, Smith transitioned to RCA Records Nashville division. A year later, in April 2024, he made his RCA Nashville debut with the extended play Through the Smoke. To promote the EP, he embarked on the Through The Smoke Tour in Fall 2024.

== Release and promotion ==
On August 23, 2024, Smith announced on social media that his second studio album, California Gold, was set to be released on October 4, 2024. To promote the album, "Fix What You Didn't Break" was released on the same day. Smith announced on his official website that the album would be available in three formats: digital download, CD, and vinyl.

=== Singles and music videos ===
On February 11, 2024, Smith released the single "Bulletproof", which became the lead single for the album. The song found commercial success, peaking at number three on the US Billboard Country Airplay chart. The song was subsequently re-recorded featuring vocals by Canadian singer-songwriter Avril Lavigne and this version was released on May 16, 2024.

"I Like It" was released as the second single from the album on July 12, 2024, along with a music video. The song is a collaboration with Swedish DJ and music producer Alesso.

A third single, "Can You Die from a Broken Heart", was released on September 30, 2024, four days ahead of the album's release. The song features vocals by Avril Lavigne, who had previously collaborated with Smith in May 2024.

== Track listing ==
California Gold standard edition track listing
No.	Title	Writer(s)	Producer(s)	Length
1.	"Fix What You Didn't Break"	Nate Smith; Ashley Gorley; Taylor Phillips; Lindsay Rimes	Rimes	3:22
2.	"Want Me Back"	Gorley; John Byron; Rimes; Smith; Phillips	Rimes	3:15
3.	"What Alone Looks Like"	James McNair; Rimes; Smith	Rimes	3:33
4.	"Can You Die from a Broken Heart" (featuring Avril Lavigne)	Kevin Fisher; Michael Matosic; Tom Walker	Rimes	3:30
5.	"Perfect"	Smith; Gorley; Phillips; Rimes	Rimes	3:23
6.	"Carry You Home"	David Hodges; Davis Naish; Drew Kennedy	Rimes	4:07
7.	"Goodbye Again"	Jacob Davis; Jacob Rice; Justin Wilson; Noah Hicks	Rimes	2:54
8.	"Not of This Earth"	Jake Torrey; Michael Pollack; Jordan Johnson; Oliver Peterhof; Stefan Johnson	Rimes	3:14
9.	"Wish I Never Felt"	Allison Veltz Cruz; Michael Tyler; Thomas Archer; Lalo Guzman	Guzman	3:16
10.	"Faith"	Alex Schwartz; Joe Khajadourian; Aaron Puckett; Jackson Morgan	Rimes	2:34
11.	"Bittersweet"	Aaron Eshuis; Brett Tyler; Ryan Hurd	Joel Bruyere	3:16
12.	"Gave It All"	Benny Morrell; Danielle Blakey; Rimes	Rimes	3:16
13.	"Hurtless"	Dan Caplen; Davin Kingston; Joe Kearns; Neil Ormandy	Rimes	2:40
14.	"Bulletproof"	Gorley; Hunter Phelps; Ben Johnson	Rimes	3:03
15.	"California Gold"	Gorley; Byron; Rimes; Smith; Phillips	Rimes	3:18
16.	"I Like It" (with Alesso)	Jake Torrey; Sean Douglas; Alessandro Lindblad; Smith; Zachary Skelton	Lindblad; Skelton	2:32
Total length:				51:10

== Charts ==
=== Weekly charts ===
Weekly chart performance for California Gold
Chart (2024)	Peak position
Australian Country Albums (ARIA)	18
Canadian Albums (Billboard)	45
UK Album Downloads (OCC)	55
UK Country Albums (OCC)	20
US Billboard 200	65
US Top Country Albums (Billboard)	12

=== Year-end charts ===
2024 year-end chart performance for California Gold
Chart (2024)	Position
Australian Country Albums (ARIA)	62

2025 year-end chart performance for California Gold
Chart (2025)	Position
US Top Country Albums (Billboard)	54

== Release history ==
Release dates and formats for California Gold
Region	Date	Format(s)	Label	Ref.
Various	October 4, 2024	CD; digital download; streaming; vinyl	Sony	
