= List of number-one country singles of 2023 (Canada) =

Canada Country was a chart published weekly by Billboard magazine.

This 50-position chart (60 since 28 October) lists the most popular country music songs, calculated weekly by airplay on 46 country music stations across Canada as monitored by Nielsen BDS. Songs are ranked by total plays. As with most other Billboard charts, the Canada Country chart features a rule for when a song enters recurrent rotation. A song is declared recurrent if it has been on the chart longer than 30 weeks and is lower than number 20 in rank.

These are the Canadian number-one country singles of 2023, per the BDS Canada Country Airplay chart..

Issue date	Country Song	Artist	Ref.
January 7	"Whiskey on You"	Nate Smith	
January 14	"Whiskey on You"	Nate Smith	
January 21	"Gold"	Dierks Bentley	
January 28	"Gold"	Dierks Bentley	
February 4	"Going, Going, Gone"	Luke Combs	
February 11	"Going, Going, Gone"	Luke Combs	
February 18	"Going, Going, Gone"	Luke Combs	
February 25	"Going, Going, Gone"	Luke Combs	
March 4	"Going, Going, Gone"	Luke Combs	
March 11	"Thought You Should Know"	Morgan Wallen	
March 18	"Thought You Should Know"	Morgan Wallen	
March 25	"Heart Like a Truck"	Lainey Wilson	
April 1	"Heart Like a Truck"	Lainey Wilson	
April 8	"Rock and a Hard Place"	Bailey Zimmerman	
April 15	"Rock and a Hard Place"	Bailey Zimmerman	
April 22	"Dancin' in the Country"	Tyler Hubbard	
April 29	"Dancin' in the Country"	Tyler Hubbard	
May 6	"Dancin' in the Country"	Tyler Hubbard	
May 13	"Memory Lane"	Old Dominion	
May 20	"Memory Lane"	Old Dominion	
May 27	"Memory Lane"	Old Dominion	
June 3	"Memory Lane"	Old Dominion	
June 10	"One Thing at a Time"	Morgan Wallen	
June 17	"One Thing at a Time"	Morgan Wallen	
June 24	"Next Thing You Know"	Jordan Davis	
July 1	"Next Thing You Know"	Jordan Davis	
July 8	"Next Thing You Know"	Jordan Davis	
July 15	"Next Thing You Know"	Jordan Davis	
July 22	"Fast Car"	Luke Combs	
July 29	"Fast Car"	Luke Combs	
August 5	"Last Night"	Morgan Wallen	
August 12	"Last Night"	Morgan Wallen	
August 19	"Need a Favor"	Jelly Roll	
August 26	"Bury Me in Georgia"	Kane Brown	
September 2	"Bury Me in Georgia"	Kane Brown	
September 9	"Love You Anyway"	Luke Combs	
September 16	"Love You Anyway"	Luke Combs	
September 23	"Trouble"	Josh Ross	
September 30	"Watermelon Moonshine"	Lainey Wilson	
October 7	"Watermelon Moonshine"	Lainey Wilson	
October 14	"Watermelon Moonshine"	Lainey Wilson	
October 21	"Religiously"	Bailey Zimmerman	
October 28	"Everything I Love"	Morgan Wallen	
November 4	"Everything I Love"	Morgan Wallen	
November 11	"Everything I Love"	Morgan Wallen	
November 18	"Everything I Love"	Morgan Wallen	
November 25	"Honky Tonkin' About"	The Reklaws & Drake Milligan	
December 2	"23"	Chayce Beckham	
December 9	"23"	Chayce Beckham	
December 16	"White Horse"	Chris Stapleton	
December 23	"World On Fire"	Nate Smith	
December 30	"World On Fire"	Nate Smith	

== See also ==
- 2023 in country music
- List of Billboard number-one country songs of 2023
