= Livin' My Best Life =

Studio album by Dylan Scott
- Released: August 5, 2022
- Genre: Country
- Length: 48:32
- Label: Curb
- Producers: Will Weatherly; Mark Holman; Matt Alderman; Curt Gibbs; Jim Ed Norman

Dylan Scott chronology
Dylan Scott (2016)	Livin' My Best Life (2022)	Easy Does It (2025)

Singles from Livin' My Best Life
- 1. "New Truck" Released: August 9, 2021; 2. "Can't Have Mine (Find You a Girl)" Released: August 29, 2022

Singles from Livin' My Best Life (Still)
- 1. "Boys Back Home" Released: December 4, 2023; 2. "This Town's Been Too Good to Us" Released: February 12, 2024; 3. "What He'll Never Have" Released: April 21, 2025

Livin My Best Life is the second studio album by American country music artist Dylan Scott, released on August 5, 2022, via Curb Records.

A deluxe reissue of the record titled Livin' My Best Life (Still) was released on March 29, 2024.

== Critical reception ==
Nicole Piering of Country Swag stated that "While Scott can do a party anthem with the best of them as evidenced on tracks like 'Amen to That' and 'Nothing to Do Town,' he shines when he's showing his softer side" and that "This is endlessly apparent on songs like 'Can't Have Mine,' 'Boy I Was Back Then,' 'Lay Down with You' and 'Tough'".

Paul Sammon of Six Shooter Country said: "Very much a country pop album with a tinge of bro country thrown in for good measure. But there’s also an element of Bible Belt, too. Something for everyone, I guess."

== Track listing ==
Livin' My Best Life track listing
No.	Title	Writer(s)	Length
1.	"New Truck"	Michael Hardy; Hunter Phelps; Ben Johnson; Ashley Gorley	2:55
2.	"Amen to That"	James McNair; Hardy; Mark Holman; Morgan Wallen	2:53
3.	"Can't Have Mine (Find You a Girl)"	Dylan Scott; Josh Melton; Dallas Wilson; Matt Alderman	3:04
4.	"In Our Blood" (featuring Jimmie Allen)	David Fanning; Brad Rempel; Matt McGinn	2:53
5.	"Static"	Hardy; Phelps; Johnson; Gorley	3:09
6.	"Lay Down with You"	Scott; Matt Alderman; Dallas Davidson	3:03
7.	"Boy I Was Back Then"	Scott; Alderman; Thomas Archer	2:54
8.	"Livin' My Best Life"	Tyler Hubbard; Brian Kelley; Thomas Rhett; Corey Crowder	3:23
9.	"Killin' Some Time"	Scott; Alderman; McNair; Holman	3:08
10.	"Ain't Much Left of Me"	Scott; Alderman; Taylor Phillips; Cole Taylor	3:07
11.	"Leave Her Alone"	Wilson; Ernest Keith Smith; Mitchell Tenpenny	3:18
12.	"Tough"	Cameron Bedell; Emily Landis; Claire Douglas	3:02
13.	"Hell Out of Me"	Alderman; Tommy Cecil; Kelsey Hart	3:04
14.	"Nobody"	Scott; Alderman; Wilson	2:43
15.	"Good Times Go By Too Fast"	Scott; Alderman; Weatherly	2:50
16.	"Nothing to Do Town"	Scott; Alderman; Cole Taylor	3:06
Total length:			48:32

Livin' My Best Life (Still) track listing
No.	Title	Writer(s)	Length
17.	"This Town's Been Too Good to Us"	Scott; Gorley; Ryan Vojtesak; John Byron; Taylor Phillips	3:12
18.	"What He'll Never Have"	Scott; Logan Robinson; Ricky Rowton; Robbie Gatlin	2:34
19.	"Boys Back Home" (with Dylan Marlowe)	Dylan Marlowe; Seth Ennis; Joe Fox	2:46
20.	"Me and My Kind"	Phillips; Brock Berryhill; Matt Roy; Jaxson Free	2:25
21.	"I'll Be a Bartender"	Grady Block; Byron; Jordan Dozzi; Rocky Block	3:18
22.	"What I'd Want Mine to Say"	Jesse Frasure; Marlowe; Jessie Jo Dillon	2:54
23.	"Heartbeat of America"	Ben Stennis; Conner Smith; Josh Mirenda	2:59
24.	"Getting Out Alive"	Scott; Matt Alderman; Dallas Wilson; Byron	3:06
25.	"Good Times Go By Too Fast" (Vavo remix)	Scott; Alderman; Weatherly	2:25
26.	"This Town's Been Too Good to Us" (Vavo remix)	Scott; Gorley; Vojtesak; Byron; Phillips	2:44
Total length:			1:16:55

== Personnel ==
=== Musicians ===
- Matt Alderman – acoustic guitar (tracks 1, 4–6, 9, 11, 12, 15), programming (tracks 1, 3–7, 9–13, 15), background vocals (tracks 1–9, 11–13, 15)
- Jimmie Allen – duet vocals (track 4)
- Tommy Cecil – programming (track 13)
- Darrick Cline – drums (tracks 14, 16)
- Garrett Cline – bass guitar (tracks 14, 16)
- Corey Crowder – programming (track 8)
- Tim Galloway – acoustic guitar (track 11), electric guitar (track 11)
- Curt Gibbs – acoustic guitar (tracks 14, 16)
- Mark Hill – bass guitar (tracks 1, 9)
- Mark Holman – programming (track 2)
- Ben Johnson – programming (track 5)
- Tony Lucido – bass guitar (tracks 4–6, 8, 15)
- Miles McPherson – drums (track 12)
- Katie Owen – background vocals (track 10)
- Katlin Owen – acoustic guitar (tracks 2, 7, 8, 10, 13), electric guitar (tracks 3, 7, 8, 10, 12, 13)
- Logan Robinson – acoustic guitar (tracks 14, 16), electric guitar (tracks 14, 16)
- Scotty Sanders – steel guitar (track 14)
- Justin Schipper – steel guitar (tracks 1, 4–6, 9, 10, 12)
- Dylan Scott – acoustic guitar (track 12), lead vocals (all tracks)
- Lars Thornton – fiddle (track 10), strings (track 10)
- Ilya Toshinsky – acoustic guitar (tracks 1, 3–6, 9, 10, 12, 13, 15), banjo (track 10), electric guitar (tracks 3, 10, 13)
- Will Weatherly – acoustic guitar (tracks 1, 4–6, 9, 11, 15), keyboards (track 11), programming (tracks 1, 4–6, 9–11, 15), background vocals (tracks 1, 4–6, 9, 11, 15)
- Derek Wells – electric guitar (tracks 1, 4–6, 9, 15)
- Dallas Wilson – electric guitar (track 3), programming (track 11), background vocals (track 3)
- Alex Wright – keyboards (tracks 1, 7–11, 13, 15, 16), piano (track 16)
- Nir Z. – drums (tracks 1, 2, 4–11, 13, 15), percussion (tracks 2, 4–7, 9–11, 15)

=== Production ===
- Matt Alderman – producer (all tracks)
- Curt Gibbs – producer (tracks 1, 9, 14, 16)
- Mark Holman – producer (track 2)
- Jim Ed Norman – producer (tracks 1, 9, 14–16)
- Will Weatherly – producer (tracks 1, 2, 4–11, 13, 15)

== Charts ==
=== Weekly charts ===
Weekly chart performance for Livin' My Best Life
Chart (2022–2024)	Peak position
Canadian Albums (Billboard)	39
US Billboard 200	60
US Top Country Albums (Billboard)	12

Weekly chart performance for Livin' My Best Life (Still)
Chart (2024)	Peak position
UK Album Downloads (Official Charts)	73

=== Year-end charts ===
2024 year-end chart performance for Livin' My Best Life
Chart (2024)	Position
US Top Country Albums (Billboard)	40

2025 year-end chart performance for Livin' My Best Life
Chart (2025)	Position
US Top Country Albums (Billboard)	71

== Certifications ==
Certifications for Livin' My Best Life
Region	Certification	Certified units/sales
United States (RIAA)	Platinum	1,000,000^{‡}
^{‡} Sales+streaming figures based on certification alone.
