= Can You Die from a Broken Heart =

2024 song by Nate Smith

Single by Nate Smith featuring Avril Lavigne

from the album California Gold
- Released: September 30, 2024
- Genre: Country
- Length: 3:30
- Label: RCA Records Nashville
- Songwriters: Kevin Fisher; Michael Matosic; Tom Walker
- Producer: Lindsay Rimes

Nate Smith singles chronology
"I Like It" (2024)	"Can You Die from a Broken Heart" (2024)	"Fix What You Didn't Break" (2024)

Avril Lavigne singles chronology
"Fake as Hell" (2023)	"Can You Die from a Broken Heart" (2024)	"77" (2025)

Music video
- "Can You Die from a Broken Heart" on YouTube

"Can You Die from a Broken Heart" is a song by American country music singer Nate Smith, featuring vocals by Canadian singer-songwriter Avril Lavigne. It was released on September 30, 2024, through RCA Records Nashville, as the third single from his second studio album, California Gold. The song was written by Kevin Fisher, Michael Matosic and Tom Walker, with Lindsay Rimes being the producer.

== Background ==
Getting the chance to work with one of your all-time favourite singers twice is humbling and such a pinch me moment. Avril is an absolute powerhouse of a vocalist but equally as a human being. It’s such a joy working with her, and I feel like I’ve learned a lot in the process.

— Nate Smith on collaborating with Avril Lavigne.

Smith and Lavigne first collaborated in May 2024. Earlier that year, in February, Smith released "Bulletproof", the lead single from his extended play Through The Smoke. A duet version of the song featuring Lavigne was subsequently released in May 2024. The two performed the song at the 59th Academy of Country Music Awards on May 15, 2024. In an interview prior to the ceremony, Smith revealed that they had worked on another song, which will be featured on his forthcoming sophomore studio album.

Before officially recording "Can You Die from a Broken Heart", Smith experimented with an AI-generated version of Lavigne's voice to envision how her vocals would complement the track. Impressed with the results, he sent the song to Lavigne without the AI replication, and she agreed to collaborate, marking their second musical partnership.

On August 23, 2024, Smith announced via social media the release of his second studio album, California Gold, along with its official track listing, which included the collaboration with Lavigne titled "Can You Die from a Broken Heart".

== Release ==
On September 30, 2024, "Can You Die from a Broken Heart" was officially released. The song was released as a digital download and to streaming services through Smith's label RCA Records Nashville. "Can You Die from a Broken Heart" serves as the third single from Smith's sophomore album California Gold.

== Composition ==
"Can You Die from a Broken Heart" was written by Kevin Fisher, Michael Matosic, Tom Walker and produced by Lindsay Rimes. The song has been labeled as a country power ballad.

Smith described "Can You Die from a Broken Heart" as "the epitome of what a heartbreak ballad should feel and sound like," emphasizing the song's emotional depth and its ability to resonate with listeners facing personal loss.

== Critical reception ==
In his review of Smith's album California Gold, James Daykin of Entertainment Focus described "Can You Die from a Broken Heart" as an album highlight, praising both artists' vocal delivery. He called it "a powerful vocal performance, with Lavigne's soaring second verse complementing Smith's gravelly tone".

== Commercial performance ==
The track debuted at number 29 on the Billboard Hot Country Songs chart for the week dated October 19, 2024, becoming Smith's sixth chart entry and Lavigne's first. It remained on the chart for a total of four weeks, concluding its run with the chart dated November 9, 2024. The duet debuted at number two on the Bubbling Under Hot 100, becoming Smith's first chart entry and Lavigne's sixth.

== Music video ==
In an interview with Billboard, Smith revealed that a music video for the song was filmed in Toronto, Canada. The music video for the song was released on October 18, 2024, and was directed by Mason Allen and Nikki Fletcher. The video features Smith and Lavigne set in a post-apocalyptic world, where they confront emotional struggles and gradually recover from heartbreak.

The video contrasts two settings: indoor scenes with flowers, symbolizing impermanence, and oceanfront shots representing timeless healing. These visuals highlight themes of recovery and the passage of time, aligning with the song's exploration of heartbreak and resilience.

== Charts ==
Chart performance for "Can You Die from a Broken Heart"
Chart (2024)	Peak position
Australia Digital Tracks (ARIA)	29
Canada Digital Songs (Billboard)	22
UK Singles Downloads (OCC)	87
UK Singles Sales (OCC)	92
US Bubbling Under Hot 100 (Billboard)	2
US Hot Country Songs (Billboard)	29

== Release history ==
Release dates and formats for "Can You Die from a Broken Heart"
Region	Date	Format(s)	Label	Ref.
Various	September 30, 2024	Digital download; streaming	RCA Records Nashville	
