= New Truck =

2021 single by Dylan Scott

Single by Dylan Scott

from the album Livin' My Best Life
- Released: August 9, 2021
- Genre: Country
- Length: 2:54
- Label: Curb
- Songwriters: Ashley Gorley; Ben Johnson; Hunter Phelps; Michael Hardy
- Producers: Will Weatherly; Matt Alderman; Curt Gibbs; Jim Ed Norman

Dylan Scott singles chronology
"Nobody" (2020)	"New Truck" (2021)	"Can't Have Mine (Find You a Girl)" (2022)

Music video
- "New Truck" on YouTube

"New Truck" is a song by American country music singer Dylan Scott. It was released on August 9, 2021, as the lead single from his second studio album Livin' My Best Life. The song was written by Ashley Gorley, Ben Johnson, Hunter Phelps and Michael Hardy, and produced by Will Weatherly, Matt Alderman, Curt Gibbs and Jim Ed Norman. It reached number one on the Billboard Country Airplay chart in August 2022, becoming Scott's second number one on that chart, and his first since "My Girl" in July 2017.

== Content ==
"New Truck" is a song about a breakup that was inspired by Scott breaking up with his now-wife, Blair Robinson, for several months. Scott explained that it is about a man finding his partner's belongings when sitting in his truck, thus wanting a new truck to stop remembering them. "We've all been in a situation where you and your significant other have broken up, and it's tough. Every time you get back in your truck, you go back to certain memories of them in there as well." The song was written by Ashley Gorley, Ben Johnson, Hunter Phelps, and Michael Hardy. Scott told American Songwriter that "I have to find stuff that's relatable to me, and 'New Truck' is one of those. It relates to my life, so why try to write something else when I could just record this great song?"

== Critical reception ==
The song was described by Jess of Taste of Country as "relatively upbeat for being filled with heartbreak". Off the Record UK published an uncredited review, which called the song "a fiery break-up anthem that is brought to life on his gritty new music video that will set his memories ablaze".

== Charts ==
=== Weekly charts ===
Weekly chart performance for "New Truck"
Chart (2021–2022)	Peak position
Canada Hot 100 (Billboard)	82
Canada Country (Billboard)	9
US Billboard Hot 100	61
US Country Airplay (Billboard)	1
US Hot Country Songs (Billboard)	13

=== Year-end charts ===
2022 year-end chart performance for "New Truck"
Chart (2022)	Position
US Country Airplay (Billboard)	28
US Hot Country Songs (Billboard)	55

== Certifications ==
Region	Certification	Certified units/sales
United States (RIAA)	Platinum	1,000,000^{‡}
^{‡} Sales+streaming figures based on certification alone.
