= Nobody (Dylan Scott song) =

Single by Dylan Scott

from the album Livin' My Best Life
- Released: February 18, 2020
- Genre: Country; gospel
- Length: 2:40
- Label: Curb
- Songwriters: Dallas Wilson; Dylan Scott; Matt Alderman
- Producers: Matt Alderman; Curt Gibbs; Jim Ed Norman

Dylan Scott singles chronology
"Nothing to Do Town" (2019)	"Nobody" (2020)	"New Truck" (2021)

"Nobody" is a song recorded by American country music singer Dylan Scott. It was released to country radio on February 18, 2020 from his second studio album Livin' My Best Life and his fourth EP Nothing to Do Town. The song was written by Scott, Dallas Wilson, Matt Alderman and produced by Matt Alderman, Curt Gibbs and Jim Ed Norman.

== Content ==
Scott shared the idea for the song: "writing 'Nobody' was basically an idea my co-writer brought to me and fit my life perfectly, it's exactly how I feel about my wife and something I've said to her before, 'Nobody is gonna love you like I do.'"

== Music video ==
The music video was released on December 18, 2020. It included his wife Blair Robinson and his two kids – Beckett Scott and Finley Gray. First the couple went into theater, which placed dozens of lit candles, then Scott played the piano at this, and played pictures of their nuptials on the screen.

== Charts ==
=== Weekly charts ===
Weekly chart performance for "Nobody"
Chart (2020–2021)	Peak position
Canada Country (Billboard)	23
US Billboard Hot 100	50
US Country Airplay (Billboard)	2
US Hot Country Songs (Billboard)	5

=== Year-end charts ===
Year-end chart performance for "Nobody"
Chart (2021)	Position
US Country Airplay (Billboard)	19
US Hot Country Songs (Billboard)	38

== Certifications ==
Region	Certification	Certified units/sales
United States (RIAA)	Platinum	1,000,000^{‡}
^{‡} Sales+streaming figures based on certification alone.
