= Hooked (Dylan Scott song) =

Single by Dylan Scott

from the album Dylan Scott
- Released: August 28, 2017
- Genre: Country
- Length: 2:30
- Label: Curb
- Songwriters: Lindsay Rimes; Seth Ennis; Morgan Evans
- Producers: Matt Alderman; Curt Gibbs; Jim Ed Norman

Dylan Scott singles chronology
"My Girl" (2016)	"Hooked" (2017)	"Nothing to Do Town" (2018)

"Hooked" is a song recorded by American country music singer Dylan Scott. It was included exclusively on the deluxe edition of his self-titled album on Curb Records. The song was written by Lindsay Rimes, Seth Ennis, and Morgan Evans.

== Content ==
The Boot stated that the song's lyrics "ring true as a country tribute to falling fast and hard into love." Taste of Country noted the song's "soft, smoky introduction", quick progression to the chorus, and "doting aggression" of the lyrics.

== Live performances ==
Scott performed the song on The Today Show on February 5, 2018.

== Music video ==
The music video was directed by Eric Welch and premiered on CMT, GAC and CMT Music in 2017. It was filmed live at a concert at Coyote Joe's in Charlotte, North Carolina.

== Chart performance ==
"Hooked" reached a peak of number two on the Billboard Country Airplay chart. The song has sold 116,000 copies in the United States as of September 2018.

== Charts ==
"Hooked" reached a peak of No. 2 in its 55th week on Country Airplay.

=== Weekly charts ===
Chart (2017–2018)	Peak position
US Billboard Hot 100	48
US Country Airplay (Billboard)	2
US Hot Country Songs (Billboard)	6

=== Year-end charts ===
Chart (2018)	Position
US Country Airplay (Billboard)	7
US Hot Country Songs (Billboard)	17

== Certifications ==
Certifications for Hooked
Region	Certification	Certified units/sales
United States (RIAA)	Platinum	1,000,000^{‡}
^{‡} Sales+streaming figures based on certification alone.
