= Fix What You Didn't Break =

Single by Nate Smith

from the album California Gold
- Released: October 28, 2024
- Genre: Country rock
- Length: 3:22
- Label: Sony Music Nashville
- Songwriters: Nate Smith; Ashley Gorley; Taylor Phillips; Lindsay Rimes
- Producer: Lindsay Rimes

Nate Smith singles chronology
"Bulletproof" (2024)	"Fix What You Didn't Break" (2024)	"After Midnight" (2025)

Official audio
- "Fix What You Didn't Break" on YouTube

"Fix What You Didn't Break" is a song by American country music singer Nate Smith, released as a single on October 28, 2024, from his second studio album, California Gold. It had initially been released ahead of the album as a promotional single on August 23, 2024. The song was written by Smith, Ashley Gorley, Taylor Phillips and Lindsay Rimes, and produced by Rimes. It is Smith's first single to not have an accompanying music video.

== Content ==
Smith shared to the song as "feels like the perfect blend of 2000's rock and heartfelt country. I want to make love songs that cut deep but are still tough. [...] I chose this to come out first because I feel like it really showcases my influences and sonic taste. It’s a bit of a theme song for this new project!"

== Critical reception ==
Chad Carlson of Today's Country Magazine said the song had "an honest track that is faithful to country music, while undoubtedly expressing Nate's influences from the pop-rock world of years past".

== Charts ==
=== Weekly charts ===
Weekly chart performance for "Fix What You Didn't Break"
Chart (2024–2025)	Peak position
Australia Digital Tracks (ARIA)	20
Australia Country Hot 50 (The Music)	11
Belgium (Ultratop 50 Flanders)	42
Canada (Canadian Hot 100)	71
Canada Country (Billboard)	39
Czech Republic Airplay (ČNS IFPI)	14
Netherlands (Dutch Top 40)	10
New Zealand Hot Singles (RMNZ)	27
UK Singles Downloads (OCC)	57
UK Singles Sales (OCC)	58
US Billboard Hot 100	52
US Country Airplay (Billboard)	2
US Hot Country Songs (Billboard)	14

=== Year-end charts ===
Year-end chart performance for "Fix What You Didn't Break"
Chart (2025)	Position
Belgium (Ultratop 50 Flanders)	119
Netherlands (Dutch Top 40)	25
US Country Airplay (Billboard)	13
US Hot Country Songs (Billboard)	23
