= Dylan Marlowe =

American singer-songwriter

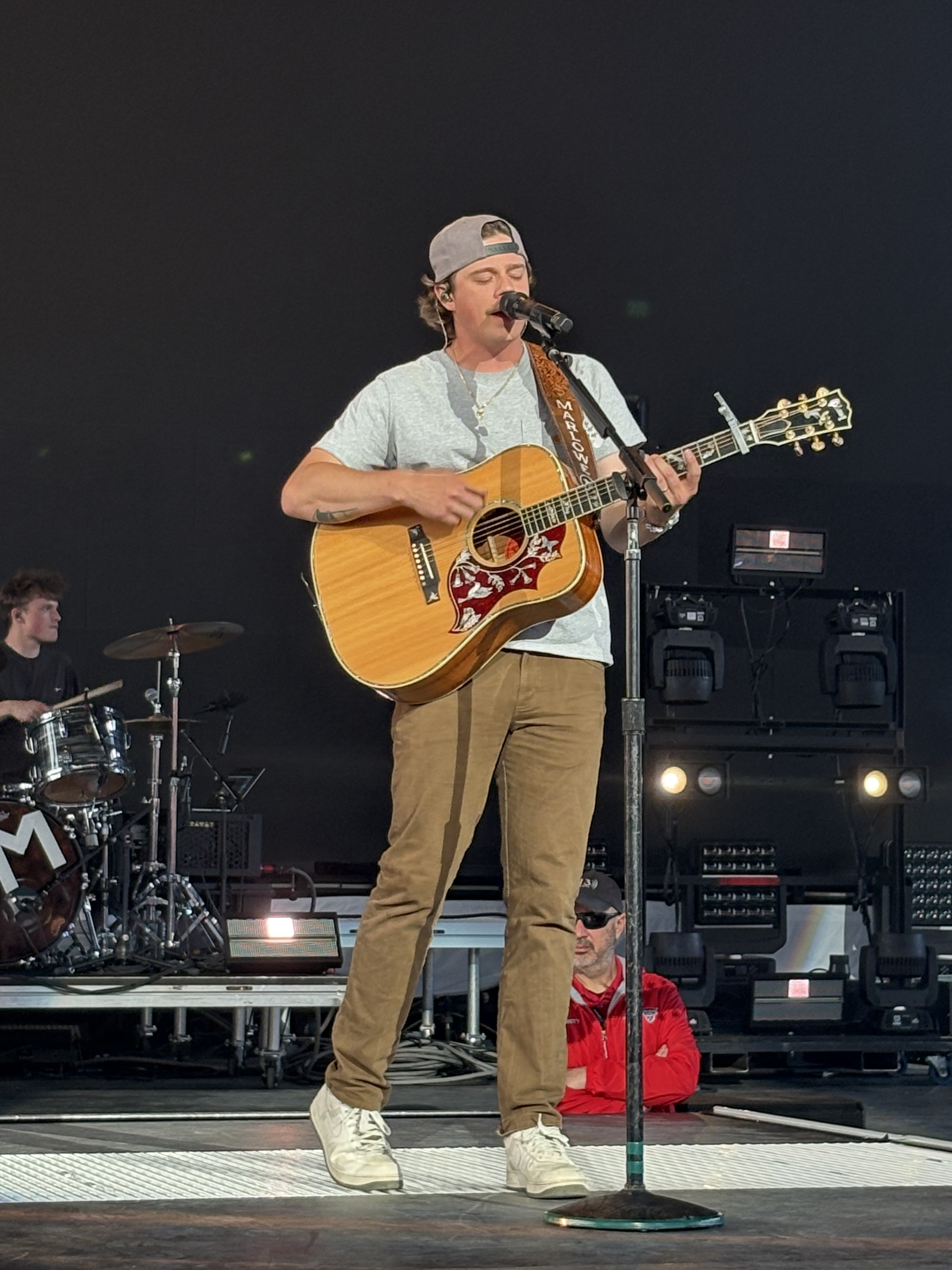
- Marlowe performing in Sterling Heights, 2025

Background information
- Born: June 9, 1997 (age 29); Statesboro, Georgia, United States
- Genre: Country
- Occupation: Singer-songwriter
- Instruments: Vocals, guitar
- Years active: 2018–present
- Label: Sony Music Nashville
- Website: www.dylanmarloweofficial.com

Dylan Marlowe (born June 9, 1997) is an American country music singer-songwriter from Statesboro, Georgia, signed to Sony Music Nashville. He released his debut album, Mid-Twenties Crisis in 2024. In addition to his work as a solo artist, Marlowe is the frontman for country and punk rock band 80 Acres, which he founded in 2026 alongside Christian Strahley, Ethan Leak, David Medlin, and John Frisch.

== Early life ==
Marlowe was born in Statesboro, Georgia. He grew up with a mix of music influences—his mom loved country, while his dad was a drummer in a Christian heavy metal band. Before getting into music, he was really into baseball and liked spending time hunting and fishing. He started learning guitar during his senior year of high school and began writing songs, inspired by artists like Eric Church, Kenny Chesney, Linkin Park, and Blink-182. He went to Georgia Southern University for a short time but dropped out after one semester. After that, he worked with his dad in construction and played at local bars and open-mic nights.

== Career ==
=== Early career (2018–2021) ===
In 2018, his father told him to either move to Nashville or keep working construction. Marlowe relocated to Nashville, Tennessee shortly before the start of the COVID-19 pandemic and signed a publishing and artist development deal with Play It Again Entertainment in 2020. The following year, he made a country version of Olivia Rodrigo’s “drivers license.” It went viral and helped him gain over 500,000 TikTok followers.

=== Commercial breakthrough (2022–present) ===
Following several self-released songs, a growing social media presence, and scoring his first number one hit as a songwriter with Jon Pardi's "Last Night Lonely", it was announced in January 2023, that Marlowe had signed a recording contract with Sony Music Nashville. His debut EP with the label, Dirt Road When I Die, was released on July 7, 2023. Marlowe's debut single to country radio, "Boys Back Home" (a duet with Dylan Scott), was released on December 4, 2023. Originally recorded in 2021, its release was delayed due to Scott's Livin' My Best Life, and Marlowe had to later re-record his vocals when the label decided to issue it as his debut single instead of "Record High". Marlowe's debut studio album, Mid-Twenties Crisis, was released on September 27, 2024.

== Personal life ==
Marlowe resides in Nashville, Tennessee. He married his longtime girlfriend, Natalie Barber—a realtor from Statesboro, GA—on May 19, 2023, in Nashville. He loves the outdoors and spends his free time fishing and hunting. He even brings chickens with him on tour.

== Discography ==
=== Studio albums ===
List of albums, with selected details
Title	Album details
Mid-Twenties Crisis	Release date: September 27, 2024; Label: Sony Music Nashville; Format: CD, digital download

=== Extended plays ===
List of EPs, with selected details
Title	EP details
Dirt Road When I Die	Release date: July 7, 2023; Label: Sony Music Nashville; Format: Digital download

=== Singles ===
List of singles, with selected chart positions
Title	Year	Peak chart positions			Certifications	Album
Title	Year	US	US Country Songs	US Country Airplay	Certifications	Album
"Boys Back Home" (with Dylan Scott)	2023	75	18	2	RIAA: Platinum; MC: Platinum	Mid-Twenties Crisis
"Picture Perfect"	2025	—	—	—		TBA
"—" denotes a recording that did not chart.

=== Other charted songs ===
List of other charted songs, with selected chart positions
Title	Year	Peak chart positions	Album
Title	Year	CAN Country	Album
"Go Tell It on the Mountain" (with Dylan Scott)	2025	54	Non-album song

=== Music videos ===
Year	Title	Director
2024	"Boys Back Home" (with Dylan Scott)	Tristan Cusick
