= What He'll Never Have =

2025 single by Dylan Scott

Single by Dylan Scott

from the album Livin' My Best Life (Still) and Easy Does It
- Released: April 21, 2025
- Genre: Country
- Length: 2:33
- Label: Curb
- Songwriters: Dylan Scott; Logan Robinson; Ricky Rowton; Robbie Gatlin
- Producer: Joe Fox

Dylan Scott singles chronology
"This Town's Been Too Good to Us" (2025)	"What He'll Never Have" (2025)	"Dear Big City" (2026)

Music video
- "What He'll Never Have" on YouTube

"What He'll Never Have" is a song by American country music singer Dylan Scott. It was sent to country radio on April 21, 2025, as the third single from Livin' My Best Life (Still) (2024), the deluxe reissue of his second studio album Livin' My Best Life (2022). It is also the lead single from his third studio album, Easy Does It (2025). The song was written by Scott himself, his brother Logan Robinson, Ricky Rowton and Robbie Gatlin and produced by Joe Fox.

== Background ==
Dylan Scott had been teasing the song on the video-sharing app TikTok prior to releasing it, leading it to become a fan-favorite. In an interview on ABC Audio, Scott also revealed that it was his wife Blair Robinson's favorite song:

She said, "What female [doesn't] want to hear that? 'If I was to die, just know that whoever you find, the love I have for you, he'll never have.'" Like, what? I don't know. She was right, though. It's a big hit for us.

== Charts ==
Chart performance for "What He'll Never Have"
Chart (2025–2026)	Peak position
Canada Hot 100 (Billboard)	76
Canada Country (Billboard)	8
New Zealand Hot Singles (RMNZ)	15
US Billboard Hot 100	55
US Country Airplay (Billboard)	2
US Hot Country Songs (Billboard)	16

== Certifications ==
Region	Certification	Certified units/sales
United States (RIAA)	Platinum	1,000,000^{‡}
^{‡} Sales+streaming figures based on certification alone.
