= Boys Back Home =

Single by Dylan Marlowe and Dylan Scott

from the album Mid-Twenties Crisis and Livin' My Best Life (Still)
- Released: December 4, 2023
- Genre: Country
- Length: 2:45
- Label: Sony Music Nashville; Curb
- Songwriters: Dylan Marlowe; Seth Ennis; Joe Fox
- Producer: Joe Fox

Dylan Marlowe singles chronology
"Boys Back Home" (2023)	"Picture Perfect" (2025)

Dylan Scott singles chronology
"Can't Have Mine (Find You a Girl)" (2022)	"Boys Back Home" (2023)	"This Town's Been Too Good to Us" (2024)

"Boys Back Home" is a song by American singer-songwriters Dylan Marlowe and Dylan Scott. It was released on December 4, 2023 as the lead single from Marlowe's debut studio album, Mid-Twenties Crisis. It also appeared as a bonus track on the re-issue of Scott's second studio album, Livin' My Best Life. Marlowe co-wrote the song with Seth Ennis and Joe Fox, with the latter also handling the track's production.

== Content ==
Marlowe co-wrote "Boys Back Home" with Seth Ennis and Joe Fox after experiencing homesickness following his move to Nashville, Tennessee and missing his friends from "back home". The idea to cut the song as a duet with Dylan Scott came about when Marlowe opened for Scott on tour. Originally recorded in 2021, its release was delayed due to Scott's Livin' My Best Life, and Marlowe had to later re-record his vocals when the label decided to issue it as his debut single instead of "Record High".

It was issued to country radio with an immediate impact date of December 4, 2023, tying as the most-added song that week at the format with 17 first-week adds.

== Music video ==
The music video for "Boys Back Home" premiered on January 30, 2024. In it, Marlowe and Scott are shown performing the song in open land in Middle Tennessee among a group of boys off-roading and drinking around a bonfire. Director Tristan Cusick referred to the video as a "redneck rager on steroids", and features cameos from fellow country artists Tayler Holder and Russell Dickerson.

== Charts ==
=== Weekly charts ===
Weekly chart performance for "Boys Back Home"
Chart (2023–2025)	Peak position
US Billboard Hot 100	75
US Country Airplay (Billboard)	2
US Hot Country Songs (Billboard)	18

=== Year-end charts ===
2024 year-end chart performance for "Boys Back Home"
Chart (2024)	Position
US Hot Country Songs (Billboard)	66

2025 year-end chart performance for "Boys Back Home"
Chart (2025)	Position
US Country Airplay (Billboard)	26
US Hot Country Songs (Billboard)	84

== Certifications ==
Certifications for "Boys Back Home"
Region	Certification	Certified units/sales
Canada (Music Canada)	Platinum	80,000^{‡}
United States (RIAA)	Platinum	1,000,000^{‡}
^{‡} Sales+streaming figures based on certification alone.
