= Makin' This Boy Go Crazy =

Single by Dylan Scott

from the EP Makin' This Boy Go Crazy
- Released: 2013
- Genre: Country
- Length: 3:11
- Label: Sidewalk
- Songwriters: Dylan Scott; Forest Glen Whitehead
- Producers: Jim Ed Norman; Lonnie Wilson

Dylan Scott singles chronology
"Makin' This Boy Go Crazy" (2013)	"Mmm, Mmm, Mmm" (2014)

"Makin' This Boy Go Crazy" is the debut single from American country music artist Dylan Scott. The tune was a top five song at SiriusXM, spending 10 weeks on the Billboard Country Airplay chart.

The vocalist recorded the song in honor of his girlfriend that he ended up marrying with a music video directed by Rob Dennis.

== Critical reception ==
Markos Papadatos of digitaljournal.com describes the title track as having a "husky, baritone voice that is reminiscent of country star Lee Brice" and that "It has a great melody to it, with warm lyrics, and it deserves to be played on country radio stations".

Billy Dukes from Taste of Country states that "Like many young singers, Scott sounds as if he's still searching for a vocal identity, but any hesitation is quickly covered by a hooky chorus and colorful lyrics" and goes on to say that the tune is "a love song with a familiar theme and beat" and that "The native Louisianan can really rumble when he reaches down to hit the low notes, but his performance won't leave female fans tingling like the greats".

Kevin Wierzbicki of antimusic states that "Scott works himself into a bit of a froth as he anticipates the next time he's able to meet up with his special lady" and that "Sure, it's just a song, but the tables are about to be turned".

== Chart positions ==
Chart (2013)	Peak position
US Country Airplay	54
