= Wreckage (Nate Smith song) =

2022 single by Nate Smith

Promotional single by Nate Smith

from the album Nate Smith
- Released: November 18, 2022
- Genre: Country
- Length: 3:32
- Label: Arista Nashville
- Songwriters: Nate Smith; Mary Kutter; Chris Sligh; Paul Wrock
- Producer: Joel Bruyere

Music video
- "Wreckage" on YouTube

"Wreckage" is a song by American country music singer Nate Smith, released as a promotional single on November 18, 2022 ahead of the release of his self-titled debut album (2023). It was written by Smith, Mary Kutter, Chris Sligh and Paul Wrock, and produced by Joel Bruyere of Canadian Christian rock band Thousand Foot Krutch.

== Content ==
In the song, Nate Smith thanks his significant other for staying with him and seeing the person he is, as opposed to others in the past who have not accepted and left him: "I'm a little damaged, but damn you saw the good / When everyone saw baggage, you loved when no one could / Laying in this bed beside you, I don't have to hide away / You see all the wreckage and it wrecks me that you stay".

== Live performances ==
Nate Smith performed the song at Billboard Country Live on July 7, 2023.

== Charts ==
Chart performance for "Wreckage"
| Chart (2023) | Peak position |
|---|---|
| US Billboard Hot 100 | 69 |
| US Hot Country Songs (Billboard) | 20 |
