= Gone (Dierks Bentley song) =

2020 song by Dierks Bentley

Single by Dierks Bentley
- Released: October 22, 2020
- Genre: Country
- Length: 3:25
- Label: Capitol Nashville
- Songwriters: Nicolle Galyon; Ben Johnson; Niko Moon
- Producer: David Garcia

Dierks Bentley singles chronology
"Living" (2019)	"Gone" (2020)	"Beers on Me" (2021)

Music video
- "Gone" on YouTube

"Gone" is a song recorded by American country music singer Dierks Bentley. It was released on October 22, 2020 as the first of two standalone singles referred to as "Covid holdover songs". The song was written by Nicolle Galyon, Ben Johnson and Niko Moon, and produced by David Garcia.

== Background ==
Bentley released "Gone" during the COVID-19 pandemic, and said: “We are all relying on lyrics and melodies at home and trying however we can to find different ways to connect with our fans, so that they know how important they still are to us. I hope this song resonates with mine, and I’m counting the days until we can all be back together again, beers in the air.”

== Music video ==
Bentley said: “It just always ends poorly for me in this video,” “I definitely had a lot more fun making it than it looks though…we got to film a bunch of scenes inspired by some of my favorite shows like The Office, MacGyver, Game of Thrones and Full House. And I got to collaborate with some new directors I’ve never worked with, so I left at the end of a really long day feeling really happy and inspired about a kind of sad song.”

The video was co-directed by Wes Edwards and Ed Pryor with contributing guest directors Travis Nicholson, Running Bear and Sam Siske.

== Commercial performance ==
"Gone" peaked at number 26 on the Billboard Hot 100, Bentley's highest charting position there since his debut single "What Was I Thinkin'", as well as second-highest of his career. It also peaked at number 2 on Billboard Country Airplay chart dated June 12, 2021, and remained there for four weeks, having been blocked from the top by Luke Combs's "Forever After All".

== Personnel ==
Credits by AllMusic

- Dierks Bentley - lead vocals
- Dave Cohen - keyboards
- Fred Eltringham - drums
- David Garcia - background vocals
- Krystal Garcia - background vocals
- Jedd Hughes - electric guitar
- Ben Johnson - programming
- Rob McNelley - electric guitar
- Russ Pahl - pedal steel guitar
- Jimmie Lee Sloas - bass guitar
- Bryan Sutton - acoustic guitar, dobro, mandolin
- Derek Wells - electric guitar

== Charts ==
=== Weekly charts ===
Weekly chart performance for "Gone"
Chart (2020–2021)	Peak position
Australia Country Hot 50 (TMN)	7
Canada Hot 100 (Billboard)	51
Canada Country (Billboard)	2
US Billboard Hot 100	26
US Country Airplay (Billboard)	2
US Hot Country Songs (Billboard)	2

=== Year-end charts ===
Year-end chart performance for "Gone"
Chart (2021)	Position
US Country Airplay (Billboard)	6
US Hot Country Songs (Billboard)	19

== Certifications ==
Certifications for "Gone"
Region	Certification	Certified units/sales
Canada (Music Canada)	Platinum	80,000^{‡}
United States (RIAA)	Platinum	1,000,000^{‡}
^{‡} Sales+streaming figures based on certification alone.
