= Nothing to Do Town =

Single by Dylan Scott

from the album Livin' My Best Life
- Released: April 26, 2019
- Genre: Country
- Length: 3:16
- Label: Curb
- Songwriters: Dylan Scott; Matt Alderman; Cole Taylor
- Producers: Matt Alderman; Curt Gibbs; Jim Ed Norman

Dylan Scott singles chronology
"Hooked" (2017)	"Nothing to Do Town" (2019)	"Nobody" (2020)

"Nothing to Do Town" is a song recorded by American country music singer Dylan Scott. It was released in April 2019 on his fourth EP Nothing to Do Town, and later included on his second studio album Livin' My Best Life. The song was written by Scott, Cole Taylor and Matt Alderman, the latter of whom produced the song with Curt Gibbs and Jim Ed Norman.

== Background ==
In an interview with Country Now, Scott explained the inspiration of the song: "It says what I wanted to say right now in my career. It’s just one of those songs about where I grew up. If you drove through my town of Bastrop, Louisiana, you would ask yourself, “what do people do here?” This is a ‘Nothing To Do Town.'” It just felt like the right single to put out."

== Music video ==
The music video was released on December 18, 2018. Clips revealed Scott a day after growing up in Bastrop, Louisiana, and invited his friends and family to duck hunting, drive SUV and hang out with friends by bonfire.

== Commercial performance ==
The song reached number 35 on the Billboard Hot Country Songs chart. On July 28, 2020, the song obtained RIAA Gold certification.

== Charts ==
=== Weekly charts ===
Chart (2019)	Peak position
US Country Airplay (Billboard)	32
US Hot Country Songs (Billboard)	35

=== Year-end charts ===
Chart (2019)	Position
US Hot Country Songs (Billboard)	77

== Certifications ==
Region	Certification	Certified units/sales
United States (RIAA)	Gold	500,000^{‡}
^{‡} Sales+streaming figures based on certification alone.
