= This Town's Been Too Good to Us =

Single by Dylan Scott

from the album Livin' My Best Life (Still)
- Released: February 12, 2024
- Genre: Country
- Length: 3:12
- Label: Curb
- Songwriters: Dylan Scott; Ashley Gorley; Ryan Vojtesak; John Byron; Taylor Phillips
- Producers: Charlie Handsome; Jacob Durrett

Dylan Scott singles chronology
"Boys Back Home" (2023)	"This Town's Been Too Good to Us" (2024)	"What He'll Never Have" (2025)

"This Town's Been Too Good to Us" is a song by American country music singer Dylan Scott. It was first released as a promotional single on June 2, 2023, and released on February 12, 2024, as the second single from the re-issue of his second studio album, Livin' My Best Life.

== Content ==
Scott discussed "This Town's Been Too Good to Us" in an interview with 59th Academy of Country Music Awards: "It's about where I grew up. It's something else I've lived."

The song is about gratitude for Scott's hometown. In the song, he reflected on the actions of his young life and the landscape there, and ultimately he expressed his admiration and sincere admiration for the hometown that nurtured him.

== Charts ==
=== Weekly charts ===
Weekly chart performance for "This Town's Been Too Good to Us"
Chart (2024–2025)	Peak position
Canada Country (Billboard)	39
US Billboard Hot 100	70
US Country Airplay (Billboard)	1
US Hot Country Songs (Billboard)	17

=== Year-end charts ===
2024 year-end chart performance for "This Town's Been Too Good to Us"
Chart (2024)	Position
US Hot Country Songs (Billboard)	88

2025 year-end chart performance for "This Town's Been Too Good to Us"
Chart (2025)	Position
US Country Airplay (Billboard)	28
US Hot Country Songs (Billboard)	61

== Certifications ==
Certifications for "This Town's Been Too Good to Us"
Region	Certification	Certified units/sales
United States (RIAA)	Platinum	1,000,000^{‡}
^{‡} Sales+streaming figures based on certification alone.
