= If He Wanted to He Would (Kylie Morgan song) =

2022 single by Kylie Morgan

Single by Kylie Morgan

from the album Making It up as I Go
- Released: July 25, 2022
- Genre: Country
- Length: 2:54
- Label: EMI Nashville
- Songwriters: Kylie Morgan; Zandi Holup; Ben Johnson
- Producers: Ben Johnson; Shane McAnally

Kylie Morgan singles chronology
"If He Wanted to He Would" (2022)	"Two Night Stands" (2024)

Music video
- "If He Wanted to He Would" on YouTube

"If He Wanted to He Would" is a song by American country music singer Kylie Morgan. It was released on July 25, 2022, as Morgan's debut single to country radio. It was initially included on her EP, P.S. (2022), and later served as the lead to her debut studio album, Making It up as I Go (2023). Morgan co-wrote the song with Zandi Holup and Ben Johnson, and it was produced by Johnson with Shane McAnally.

== Background ==
Kylie Morgan was inspired to write "If He Wanted to He Would" around the titular phrase after seeing it used on social media platforms, notably TikTok. She also made a connection with singer-songwriter Zandi Holup through the app, which led to her reaching out to enlist her help with co-writing, and the two met in March 2021. Morgan felt the song was darker than initially intended, so they later enlisted the help of Ben Johnson with a second writing session in August 2021, where he fleshed out the melody. Johnson ultimately co-produced the track with Shane McAnally.

"If He Wanted to He Would" was certified Gold by the RIAA in March 2024.

== Music video ==
Directed by Carlos Ruiz, the music video for "If He Wanted to He Would" premiered on November 2, 2022.

== Charts ==
Weekly chart performance for "If He Wanted to He Would"
Chart (2022–2023)	Peak position
US Country Airplay (Billboard)	38
US Hot Country Songs (Billboard)	39

== Certifications ==
Certifications for "If He Wanted to He Would"
Region	Certification	Certified units/sales
United States (RIAA)	Gold	500,000^{‡}
^{‡} Sales+streaming figures based on certification alone.
