= List of Top Country Albums number ones of 2023 =

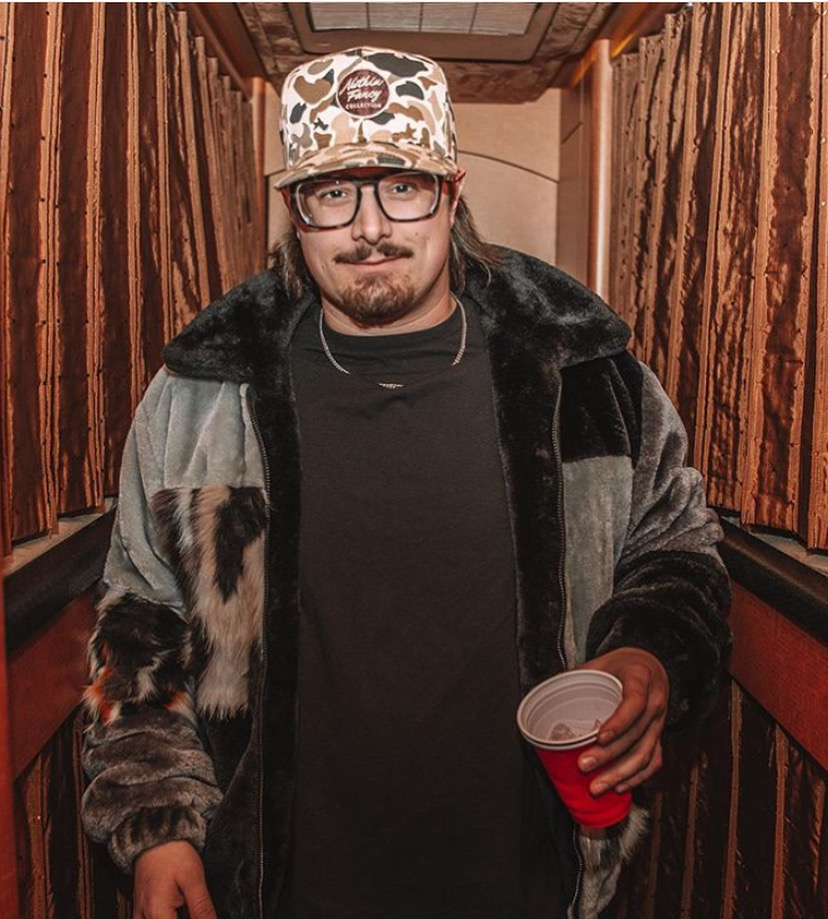
Hardy topped the chart in February with The Mockingbird & the Crow.

Top Country Albums is a chart that ranks the top-performing country music albums in the United States, published by Billboard. Chart positions are based on multi-metric consumption, blending traditional album sales, track equivalent albums, and streaming equivalent albums.

In the issue of Billboard dated January 7, Morgan Wallen's Dangerous: The Double Album spent its 89th week at number one; since entering the chart at number one in January 2021 it had only spent 14 weeks off the top spot. The album spent nine weeks atop the chart in 2023, taking its total to 97 weeks at number one, before Wallen replaced himself in the peak position in the issue dated March 18 with his next album, One Thing at a Time, which by the end of the year had spent 33 weeks at number one.

In February, Hardy gained his first number-one album when The Mockingbird & the Crow topped the chart for a single week, the only week between the start of the year and mid-July when Wallen was absent from the top spot.

== Chart history ==
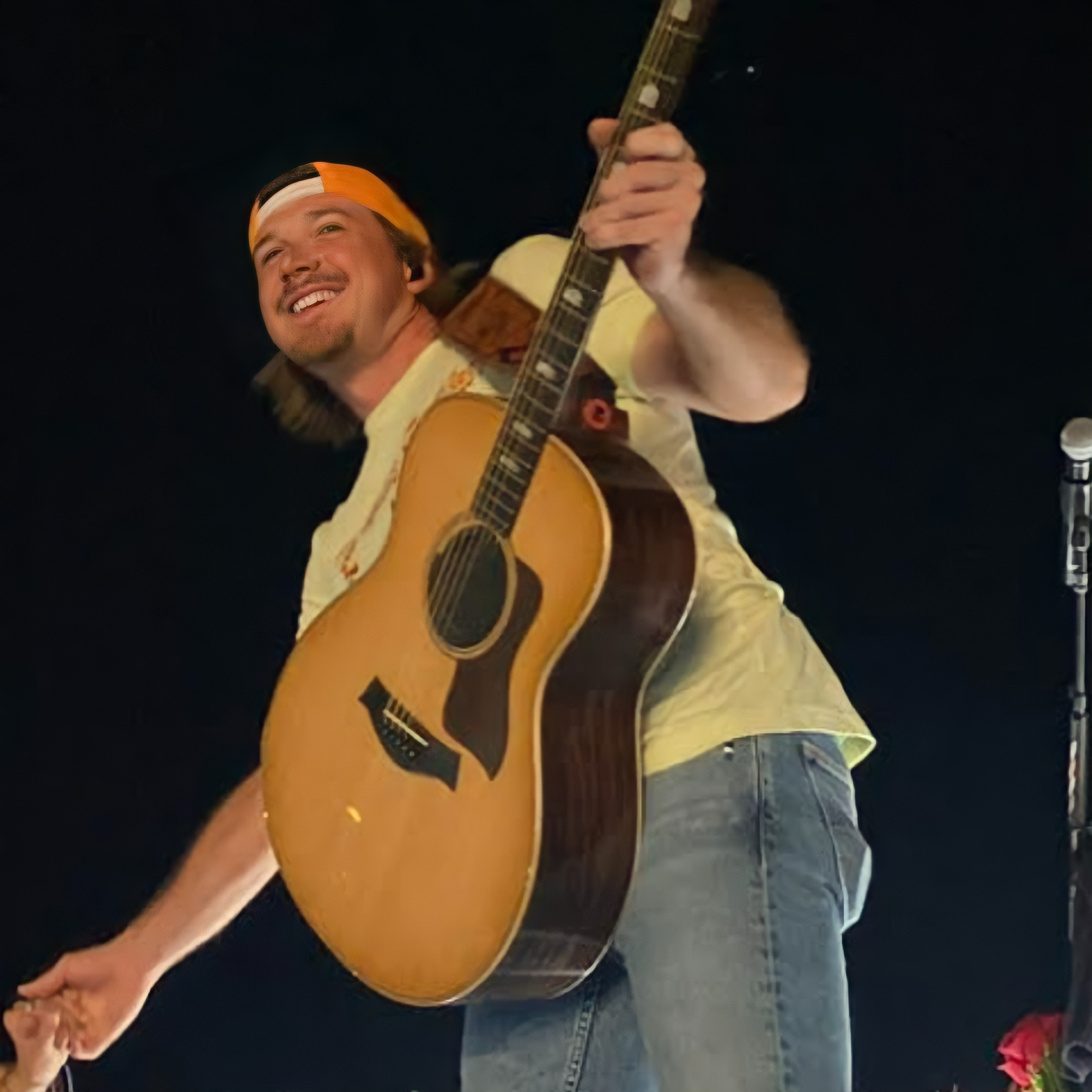
Morgan Wallen spent over 40 weeks in the number-one position in 2023.

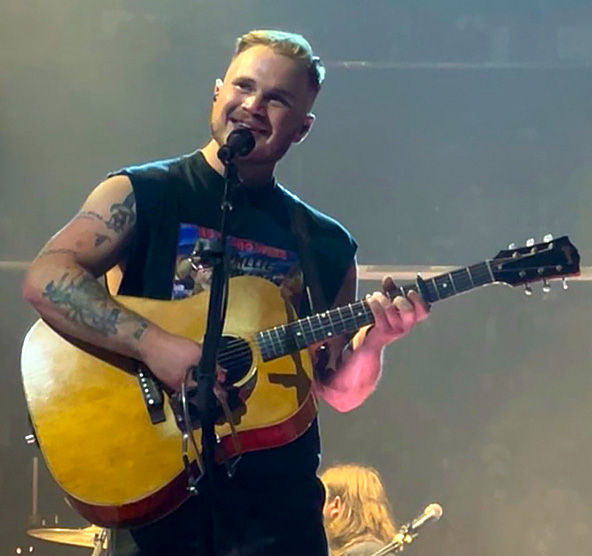
The self-titled album by Zach Bryan spent five weeks in the top spot.

Issue date	Title	Artist(s)	Ref.
January 7	Dangerous: The Double Album	Morgan Wallen	
January 14	Dangerous: The Double Album	Morgan Wallen	
January 21	Dangerous: The Double Album	Morgan Wallen	
January 28	Dangerous: The Double Album	Morgan Wallen	
February 4	The Mockingbird & the Crow	Hardy	
February 11	Dangerous: The Double Album	Morgan Wallen	
February 18	Dangerous: The Double Album	Morgan Wallen	
February 25	Dangerous: The Double Album	Morgan Wallen	
March 4	Dangerous: The Double Album	Morgan Wallen	
March 11	Dangerous: The Double Album	Morgan Wallen	
March 18	One Thing at a Time	Morgan Wallen	
March 25	One Thing at a Time	Morgan Wallen	
April 1	One Thing at a Time	Morgan Wallen	
April 8	One Thing at a Time	Morgan Wallen	
April 15	One Thing at a Time	Morgan Wallen	
April 22	One Thing at a Time	Morgan Wallen	
April 29	One Thing at a Time	Morgan Wallen	
May 6	One Thing at a Time	Morgan Wallen	
May 13	One Thing at a Time	Morgan Wallen	
May 20	One Thing at a Time	Morgan Wallen	
May 27	One Thing at a Time	Morgan Wallen	
June 3	One Thing at a Time	Morgan Wallen	
June 10	One Thing at a Time	Morgan Wallen	
June 17	One Thing at a Time	Morgan Wallen	
June 24	One Thing at a Time	Morgan Wallen	
July 1	One Thing at a Time	Morgan Wallen	
July 8	One Thing at a Time	Morgan Wallen	
July 15	One Thing at a Time	Morgan Wallen	
July 22	Speak Now (Taylor's Version)	Taylor Swift	
July 29	Speak Now (Taylor's Version)	Taylor Swift	
August 5	One Thing at a Time	Morgan Wallen	
August 12	One Thing at a Time	Morgan Wallen	
August 19	One Thing at a Time	Morgan Wallen	
August 26	One Thing at a Time	Morgan Wallen	
September 2	One Thing at a Time	Morgan Wallen	
September 9	Zach Bryan	Zach Bryan	
September 16	Zach Bryan	Zach Bryan	
September 23	Zach Bryan	Zach Bryan	
September 30	Zach Bryan	Zach Bryan	
October 7	One Thing at a Time	Morgan Wallen	
October 14	One Thing at a Time	Morgan Wallen	
October 21	One Thing at a Time	Morgan Wallen	
October 28	Zach Bryan	Zach Bryan	
November 4	One Thing at a Time	Morgan Wallen	
November 11	One Thing at a Time	Morgan Wallen	
November 18	One Thing at a Time	Morgan Wallen	
November 25	Higher	Chris Stapleton	
December 2	Rockstar	Dolly Parton	
December 9	One Thing at a Time	Morgan Wallen	
December 16	One Thing at a Time	Morgan Wallen	
December 23	One Thing at a Time	Morgan Wallen	
December 30	One Thing at a Time	Morgan Wallen	

== See also ==
- 2023 in country music
- List of Billboard number-one country songs of 2023
