= My Girl (Dylan Scott song) =

Single by Dylan Scott

from the album Dylan Scott
- Released: July 11, 2016
- Genre: Country
- Length: 3:17
- Label: Curb
- Songwriters: Dylan Scott; Josh Kerr
- Producers: Matt Alderman; Jim Ed Norman

Dylan Scott singles chronology
"Crazy Over Me" (2015)	"My Girl" (2016)	"Hooked" (2017)

"My Girl" is a song co-written and recorded by American country music singer Dylan Scott. It is included on his self-titled debut album and is his first number one hit on the Country Airplay chart. The song was written by Scott and Josh Kerr.

== Content ==
The song was described by Taste of Country as "a love song that finds him bragging on a girlfriend" and "What's charming is this self-described man’s man sharing of his tender side".

It was inspired by Scott's wife, Blair.

== Critical reception ==
Matt Bjorke of Roughstock, in a review of the album, said that "It's a song that'll melt many a heart and one that could and should be his breakout hit."

== Commercial performance ==
The song was certified Gold by the Recording Industry Association of America (RIAA) on June 20, 2017. It has sold 380,000 copies in the US as of August 2017. On June 9, 2023, the song was certified 3× Platinum for certified sales of over 3 million equivalent units.

== Charts ==
=== Weekly charts ===
Chart (2016–2017)	Peak position
Canada Country (Billboard)	18
US Billboard Hot 100	39
US Country Airplay (Billboard)	1
US Hot Country Songs (Billboard)	3

=== Year-end charts ===
Chart (2017)	Peak position
US Billboard Country Airplay	6
US Billboard Hot Country Songs	12
US Billboard Radio Songs	67

== Certifications ==
Region	Certification	Certified units/sales
United States (RIAA)	3× Platinum	3,000,000^{‡}
^{‡} Sales+streaming figures based on certification alone.
