= Kylie Morgan =

American singer-songwriter

- Born: Oklahoma, United States
- Genres: Country
- Occupation: Singer-songwriter
- Instruments: Vocals, guitar
- Years active: 2018–present
- Label: EMI Nashville
- Website: www.kyliemorgan.com

Kylie Morgan is an American country music singer-songwriter from Oklahoma signed to EMI Nashville.

== Background ==
Kylie Morgan began performing and touring full-time at the age of 14, and ultimately signed a recording contract with Universal Music Group Nashville, being assigned to the EMI Nashville imprint. One of Morgan's early songs, "Phoebe", was written about teen suicide, and led to the singer touring schools across the United States to perform and talk about the impact of bullying, spearheaded by her own bullying prevention campaign. She began sharing vulnerable songs on TikTok, and released a pair of EPs: Love, Kylie (2021) and P.S. (2022). "If He Wanted to He Would" was issued to country radio as Morgan's debut single on July 25, 2022, and became a top 40 hit on the Billboard Country Airplay and Hot Country Songs charts. It served as the lead single to her full-length debut project, Making It up as I Go, which was released on October 13, 2023.

"Two Night Stands" was released on April 1, 2024, as Morgan's second single to country radio.

== Discography ==
=== Studio albums ===
List of studio albums, with selected details, chart positions and sales
Title	Album details
Making It up as I Go	Release date: October 13, 2023; Label: EMI Nashville; Format: CD, digital download, LP

=== Extended plays ===
List of EPs, with selected details, chart positions and sales
Title	Album details
Love, Kylie	Release date: June 11, 2021; Label: EMI Nashville; Format: Digital download
P.S.	Release date: July 1, 2022; Label: EMI Nashville; Format: CD, Digital download
The Healed Cowgirl, Pt. 1	Release date: April 10, 2026; Label: Curlytop; Format: Digital download

=== Singles ===
List of singles, with selected chart positions
Title	Year	Peak chart positions		Album
Title	Year	US Country Airplay	US Country	Album
"If He Wanted to He Would"	2022	38	39	Making It up as I Go
"Two Night Stands"	2024	—	—	Non-album single
