= Sean Stemaly =

American country music singer and songwriter

- Origin: Newburgh, Indiana, U.S.
- Genres: Country
- Occupation: Singer-songwriter
- Years active: 2018–present
- Labels: LMG; Big Loud
- Website: seanstemaly.com

Sean Stemaly is an American country singer and songwriter. He was previously signed to Big Loud Records, and released the album Product of a Small Town.

== Biography ==
Stemaly was born in Western Kentucky, and raised in Newburgh, IN. Prior to pursuing a career in music, Stemaly worked for his father and grandfather who operate a land development company and a farm. In his teens, Stemaly taught himself to sing while driving a tractor. Stemaly cites Ronnie Dunn, Tyler Childers, and Luke Combs as musical influences.

In August 2019, Stemaly signed with Big Loud Records and released the track "Back on a Backroad", co-written by Hardy.

Since joining Big Loud, Stemaly has released four more songs: “Z71”, "Last Night All Day", "Come Back to Bed", and "As Far As I Know". Stemaly has also opened on tour dates for Morgan Wallen, Riley Green, Hardy, Lanco, and Chris Lane.

== Discography ==
=== Studio albums ===
| Title | Album details |
|---|---|
| Product of a Small Town | Release date: February 18, 2022; Label: Big Loud |

=== Music videos ===
| Year | Video | Director |
|---|---|---|
| 2018 | "Fading Away" | Austin Peckham |
| 2018 | "Drunk Kissin'" | Unlisted |
| 2019 | "Back on a Backroad" | Unlisted |
| 2020 | "Last Night All Day" | Justin Clough |
| 2020 | "Come Back to Bed" | Jocelyn Cooper |
| 2020 | "As Far As I Know" | Unlisted |
| 2021 | "Hello, You Up" | Unlisted |
| 2021 | "Z71" | Unlisted |
