= Dylan Scott (album) =

Studio album by Dylan Scott
- Released: August 12, 2016
- Genre: Country
- Length: 41:22 (Original Release); 49:50 (Reissue Version)
- Label: Curb
- Producers: Matt Alderman (all tracks except 15); Jim Ed Norman (all tracks); Kyle Jacobs (track 15); Matt McClure (track 15); Curt Gibbs (tracks 5–7, 10, 14)

Dylan Scott chronology
| Makin' This Boy Go Crazy (2014) | Dylan Scott (2016) | Nothing to Do Town (2019) |

Singles from Dylan Scott
- 1. "Lay It on Me" Released: November 3, 2014; 2. "Crazy Over Me" Released: October 19, 2015; 3. "My Girl" Released: July 11, 2016; 4. "Hooked" Released: August 28, 2017

Dylan Scott is the debut studio album by American country music singer Dylan Scott. It was released on August 12, 2016, by Curb Records. The album features the single "My Girl", which was a number one hit on the Billboard Country Airplay chart. The album was re-released on August 4, 2017 with three new songs added.

== Content ==
Scott co-wrote seven of the album's 13 tracks, including its first three singles. "Lay It on Me" was released in November 2014 as the first single from the album, though it failed to chart. "Crazy Over Me" was released as the second single in October 2015 and managed to become Scott's first top 40 hit on both the Billboard Country Airplay and Hot Country Songs charts. The third single, "My Girl," was released in July 2016 and became his first number one hit on the Billboard Country Airplay chart, while also reaching the top 40 of the Billboard Hot 100.

The album was reissued on August 4, 2017, as a deluxe edition, with three new songs included. "Hooked" was released as the album's fourth single and became Scott's second top 20 hit on the Country Airplay charts. The other two new songs were "Sleeping Beauty" and "Can't Take Her Anywhere."

== Commercial performance ==
The album debuted on the US Billboard 200 at number 46, and the Top Country Albums chart at number five, with 9,000 copies sold in the US in its first week. The album has sold 55,400 copies in the US as of January 2018.

== Track listing ==
Dylan Scott - Standard edition
| No. | Title | Writer(s) | Length |
|---|---|---|---|
| 1. | "Lay It on Me" | Josh Kerr; Dylan Scott | 2:58 |
| 2. | "My Town" | Matt Alderman; David Fanning; Curt Gibbs | 3:07 |
| 3. | "Passenger Seat" | Kerr; Scott; Forest Glen Whitehead | 3:29 |
| 4. | "My Girl" | Kerr; Scott | 3:17 |
| 5. | "Back" | Josh Osborne; Jimmy Robbins; Scott Stepakoff | 3:01 |
| 6. | "Crazy Over Me" | Alderman; Scott | 3:19 |
| 7. | "Ball Cap" | Cassidy Lynn Alexander; Scott; Whitehead | 2:37 |
| 8. | "Beer Buddies" | Scott; Whitehead | 3:21 |
| 9. | "Freak Show" | Alderman; Mike Eli; Gibbs; Jon Jones | 3:16 |
| 10. | "I Lost You" | Alderman; Sarah Davidson; Ty Graham | 3:37 |
| 11. | "Living Room" | Brian Callihan; Matthew Rogers; Wynn Varble | 3:08 |
| 12. | "Rules" | Jeston Cade; Steph Jones; Jordan Reynolds | 2:49 |
| 13. | "Do You Think About Me" | Alderman; Tommy Cecil; Scott | 3:23 |
| Total length: | | | 41:22 |

Dylan Scott - Deluxe Edition
| No. | Title | Writer(s) | Length |
|---|---|---|---|
| 1. | "My Girl" | Josh Kerr; Dylan Scott | 3:17 |
| 2. | "Crazy Over Me" | Matt Alderman; Scott | 3:19 |
| 3. | "Lay It on Me" | Kerr; Scott | 2:58 |
| 4. | "Ball Cap" | Cassidy Lynn Alexander; Scott; Forest Glen Whitehead | 2:37 |
| 5. | "Hooked" | Lindsay Rimes; Seth Ennis; Morgan Evans | 2:29 |
| 6. | "Sleeping Beauty" | Scott; Alderman; Lee Brice | 3:16 |
| 7. | "My Town" | Alderman; David Fanning; Curt Gibbs | 3:07 |
| 8. | "Beer Buddies" | Scott; Whitehead | 3:21 |
| 9. | "Passenger Seat" | Kerr; Scott; Whitehead | 3:29 |
| 10. | "Can't Take Her Anywhere" | Scott; Kerr; Mike Krompass | 2:41 |
| 11. | "I Lost You" | Alderman; Sarah Davidson; Ty Graham | 3:37 |
| 12. | "Do You Think About Me" | Alderman; Tommy Cecil; Scott | 3:23 |
| 13. | "Living Room" | Brian Callihan; Matthew Rogers; Wynn Varble | 3:08 |
| 14. | "Freak Show" | Alderman; Mike Eli; Gibbs; Jon Jones | 3:16 |
| 15. | "Back" | Josh Osborne; Jimmy Robbins; Scott Stepakoff | 3:01 |
| 16. | "Rules" | Jeston Cade; Steph Jones; Jordan Reynolds | 2:49 |
| Total length: | | | 49:50 |

== Personnel ==
Adapted from AllMusic

- Matt Alderman – acoustic guitar, programming, background vocals
- Stephen Barker Lyles – background vocals
- Tom Bukovac – electric guitar
- Darrick Cline – drums
- Garrett Cline – bass guitar
- Perry Coleman – background vocals
- Curt Gibbs – acoustic guitar, electric guitar, programming
- Dan Dugmore – steel guitar
- Josue Meza Garcia – keyboards, piano
- Eric Gunderson – background vocals
- Tommy Harden – drums
- Mark Hill – bass guitar
- Jillian Jacqueline – background vocals
- Mike Johnson – steel guitar
- Jeff King – electric guitar
- Troy Lancaster – electric guitar
- Josh Matheny – dobro
- Pat McGrath – acoustic guitar
- Jerry McPherson – electric guitar
- Russ Pahl – steel guitar
- Brent Rader – banjo, acoustic guitar, mandolin
- Logan Robinson – acoustic guitar, electric guitar
- Chris Rodriguez – electric guitar
- Mike Rojas – Hammond B-3 organ, keyboards
- Scotty Sanders – steel guitar
- Dylan Scott – electric guitar, lead vocals, background vocals
- Jason Webb – keyboards

== Charts ==
=== Weekly charts ===
| Chart (2016–17) | Peak position |
|---|---|
| Canadian Albums (Billboard) | 62 |
| US Billboard 200 | 46 |
| US Top Country Albums (Billboard) | 5 |

=== Year-end charts ===
| Chart (2017) | Position |
|---|---|
| US Top Country Albums (Billboard) | 63 |

== Certifications ==
| Region | Certification | Certified units/sales |
|---|---|---|
| United States (RIAA) | Gold | 500,000^{‡} |
^{‡} Sales+streaming figures based on certification alone.
