= Can't Have Mine (Find You a Girl) =

Single by Dylan Scott

from the album Livin' My Best Life
- Released: August 29, 2022
- Genre: Country
- Length: 3:04
- Label: Curb
- Songwriters: Dylan Scott; Josh Melton; Dallas Wilson; Matt Alderman
- Producer: Matt Alderman

Dylan Scott singles chronology
"New Truck" (2021)	"Can't Have Mine (Find You a Girl)" (2022)	"Boys Back Home" (2023)

"Can't Have Mine (Find You a Girl)" is a song by American country music singer Dylan Scott. It was released on August 29, 2022 as the second single from his second studio album Livin' My Best Life.

== Content ==
Scott wrote the song with Dallas Wilson, Josh Melton, and Matt Alderman. Billy Dukes of Taste of Country describes the song as a "traditional country ballad" about a man who "suggest[s] places to find true love". Caleigh DiCaprio of Country Swag wrote that the song consists of the narrator offering advice to people looking to seek a female companion and telling them that they "can't have [his]". She also thought the song was inspired by Scott's wife, Blair.

== Chart performance ==
=== Weekly charts ===
Weekly chart performance for "Can't Have Mine (Find You a Girl)"
Chart (2022–2024)	Peak position
Canada Hot 100 (Billboard)	95
Canada Country (Billboard)	6
US Billboard Hot 100	57
US Country Airplay (Billboard)	1
US Hot Country Songs (Billboard)	10

=== Year-end charts ===
2022 year-end chart performance for "Can't Have Mine (Find You a Girl)"
Chart (2022)	Position
US Hot Country Songs (Billboard)	95

2023 year-end chart performance for "Can't Have Mine (Find You a Girl)"
Chart (2023)	Position
US Country Airplay (Billboard)	38
US Hot Country Songs (Billboard)	56

2024 year-end chart performance for "Can't Have Mine (Find You a Girl)"
Chart (2024)	Position
US Country Airplay (Billboard)	53
US Hot Country Songs (Billboard)	98

== Certifications ==
Certifications for "Can't Have Mine (Find You a Girl)"
Region	Certification	Certified units/sales
United States (RIAA)	Platinum	1,000,000^{‡}
^{‡} Sales+streaming figures based on certification alone.
