= Nate Smith (album) =

Studio album by Nate Smith
- Released: April 28, 2023
- Genre: Country
- Length: 63:35
- Label: Arista Nashville
- Producer: Lindsay Rimes; Joel Bruyere

Nate Smith chronology
Nate Smith (2023)	Through the Smoke (2024)

Singles from Nate Smith
- 1. "Whiskey on You" Released: June 27, 2022; 2. "World on Fire" Released: June 5, 2023

Nate Smith is the debut studio album by American country music singer Nate Smith, released through Arista Nashville on April 28, 2023. It was supported by the singles "Whiskey on You" and "World on Fire”, with both reaching number one on Country Airplay, and the latter song tying a record for the longest-running number one single in the chart's history, spending ten weeks at the top. Smith co-wrote 19 of the 26 tracks. The album reached the top 30 of the US Billboard 200.

== Critical reception ==
Professional ratings
Review scores
Source	Rating
AllMusic	3/5 stars
Entertainment Focus	4/5 stars
Holler	7/10

Stephen Thomas Erlewine wrote that Smith "doesn't rely on any flashy tricks and is happy to sing whatever kind of tune comes his way" and "has a slight rasp in his pleading voice that helps give his songs a slight earthiness". Erlewine also felt that Smith "truly flourishes when he's singing an appealingly tacky combination of modern pop and retro-dance. He doesn't do that all the way through this lengthy debut, but he does it enough to distinguish himself from the po-faced likes of Bailey Zimmerman". James Daykin of Entertainment Focus found "that by including so many tracks for consideration you aren't really presenting an album that creates a joined up narrative. There's no ebb and flow to the project as a whole", but if the listener wants "melodic, guitar orientated country pop/rock, Smith can deliver that in his sleep". Soda Canter of Holler described the "album's subject matter [as] not straying far from what has already been established. Smith acts with tender vulnerability, one that showcases his desire to find joy in love. It's love, both of the self and others, that's demonstrated throughout the near-hour-and-a-half blues, pop and rock-infused country album".

== Track listing ==
Nate Smith track listing
No.	Title	Writer(s)	Length
1.	"If I Could Stop Loving You"	Jason Massey; Matt Rogers; Justin Wilson	3:26
2.	"Alright, Alright, Alright"	Joey Hendricks; Jessie Jo Dillon; Daniel Ross	2:40
3.	"One Good Girl"	Nate Smith; Lindsay Rimes; Jonathan Singleton	2:59
4.	"Back at It Again"	Trannie Anderson; Adam Doleac; Massey	3:03
5.	"You Ain't Been in Love"	N. Smith; Zach Abend; Andy Albert; Blake Pendergrass	3:09
6.	"Better Boy"	Michael Hardy; Taylor Phillips	2:55
7.	"You Only Want Me When You're Drunk"	N. Smith; Rimes; Seth Alley	2:56
8.	"Bad Memory"	N. Smith; James McNair; Rimes; Emily Weisband	2:55
9.	"Oil Spot"	Jared Hampton; Tate Howell; Drew Kennedy	3:50
10.	"Wreckage"	N. Smith; Mary Kutter; Chris Sligh; Paul Wrock	3:32
11.	"LFG"	N. Smith; Adam James; Mikey Reaves	2:36
12.	"Whiskey on You"	N. Smith; Rimes; Russell Sutton	3:03
13.	"You Shouldn't Have To"	N. Smith; Matt Alderman; Brian Bunn	2:47
14.	"Sleeve"	N. Smith; Brian Scott Alexander; Kutter; Noah Jackson Lubert	4:21
15.	"I Found You"	N. Smith; Chris Gelbuda; Kyle Schlienger	3:26
16.	"Backseat"	Adam James; Steven McMorran; Andy Sheridan	3:02
17.	"Name Storms After"	N. Smith; Anderson; Alley	3:15
18.	"Raised Up"	N. Smith; Anderson; Jonathan Smith	3:21
19.	"Under My Skin"	N. Smith; Trysette Maree Loosemore; Larry McCoy	2:58
20.	"I Don't Wanna Go to Heaven"	N. Smith; Daniel Fernandez	3:21
Total length:			63:35

Deluxe edition additional tracks
No.	Title	Writer(s)	Length
21.	"World on Fire"	N. Smith; Ashley Gorley; Phillips; Rimes	3:09
22.	"I Don't Miss You"	Alley; McNair; Heath Warren	3:18
23.	"Good by Now"	N. Smith; Gorley; Phillips; Rimes	2:53
24.	"What an Angel Ain't"	N. Smith; Zach Abend; Hardy	3:05
25.	"Dear Heart"	N. Smith; Tofer Brown; Weisband	3:43
26.	"Love Is Blind"	N. Smith; Dillon; Jesse Frasure; Geoff Warburton	2:47
Total length:			82:30

Deluxe edition digital bonus track
No.	Title	Writer(s)	Length
27.	"Chasing Cars"	Lightbody; Quinn; Connolly; Wilson; Simpson	4:25
Total length:			86:55

== Charts ==
=== Weekly charts ===
Weekly chart performance for Nate Smith
Chart (2023)	Peak position
Australian Country Albums (ARIA)	14
Canadian Albums (Billboard)	24
UK Album Downloads (OCC)	34
UK Country Albums (OCC)	7
US Billboard 200	30
US Top Country Albums (Billboard)	6

=== Year-end charts ===
Year-end chart performance for Nate Smith
Chart (2023)	Position
US Top Country Albums (Billboard)	42
Chart (2024)	Position
Australian Country Albums (ARIA)	41
US Top Country Albums (Billboard)	47

== Certifications ==
Certifications for Nate Smith
Region	Certification	Certified units/sales
Canada (Music Canada)	Platinum	80,000^{‡}
Norway (IFPI Norway)	Gold	10,000^{‡}
United States (RIAA)	Gold	500,000^{‡}
^{‡} Sales+streaming figures based on certification alone.
