= Kelsey Hart =

American singer-songwriter

- Born: Kentucky, United States
- Genres: Country
- Occupation: Singer-songwriter
- Instruments: Vocals, guitar
- Years active: 2017–present
- Label: Curb
- Website: officialkelseyhart.com

Kelsey Hart is an American country music singer-songwriter from Kentucky signed to Curb Records.

== Background ==
After several years of songwriting for other artists under Word Music Publishing, Hart signed his own record deal with Curb Records in January 2023. His debut single, "Life with You", was released in November 2023, and charted on the Billboard Country Airplay chart. It served as the lead single and title track to his debut studio album, which was released on May 31, 2024.

Hart made his Grand Ole Opry debut on June 28, 2024.

== Discography ==
=== Studio albums ===
List of studio albums, with selected details, chart positions and sales
Title	Album details
Life with You	Release date: May 31, 2024; Label: Curb; Format: CD, digital download

=== Singles ===
==== As lead artist ====
List of singles, with selected chart positions
Title	Year	Peak chart positions			Album
Title	Year	US Country	US Country Airplay	CAN Country	Album
"Life with You"	2023	49	26	59	Life with You
"Fireworks"	2025	—	36	—	TBA
"Love to Be That Guy"	2026	—	—	—	TBA
"—" denotes a recording that did not chart.

==== As featured artist ====
List of singles, with selected chart positions
Title	Year	Peak chart positions		Album
Title	Year	US AC	US Adult	Album
"Freedom" (Harper Grace featuring Kelsey Hart)	2025	15	20	—N/a
