= Dylan Scott =

American singer (born 1990)

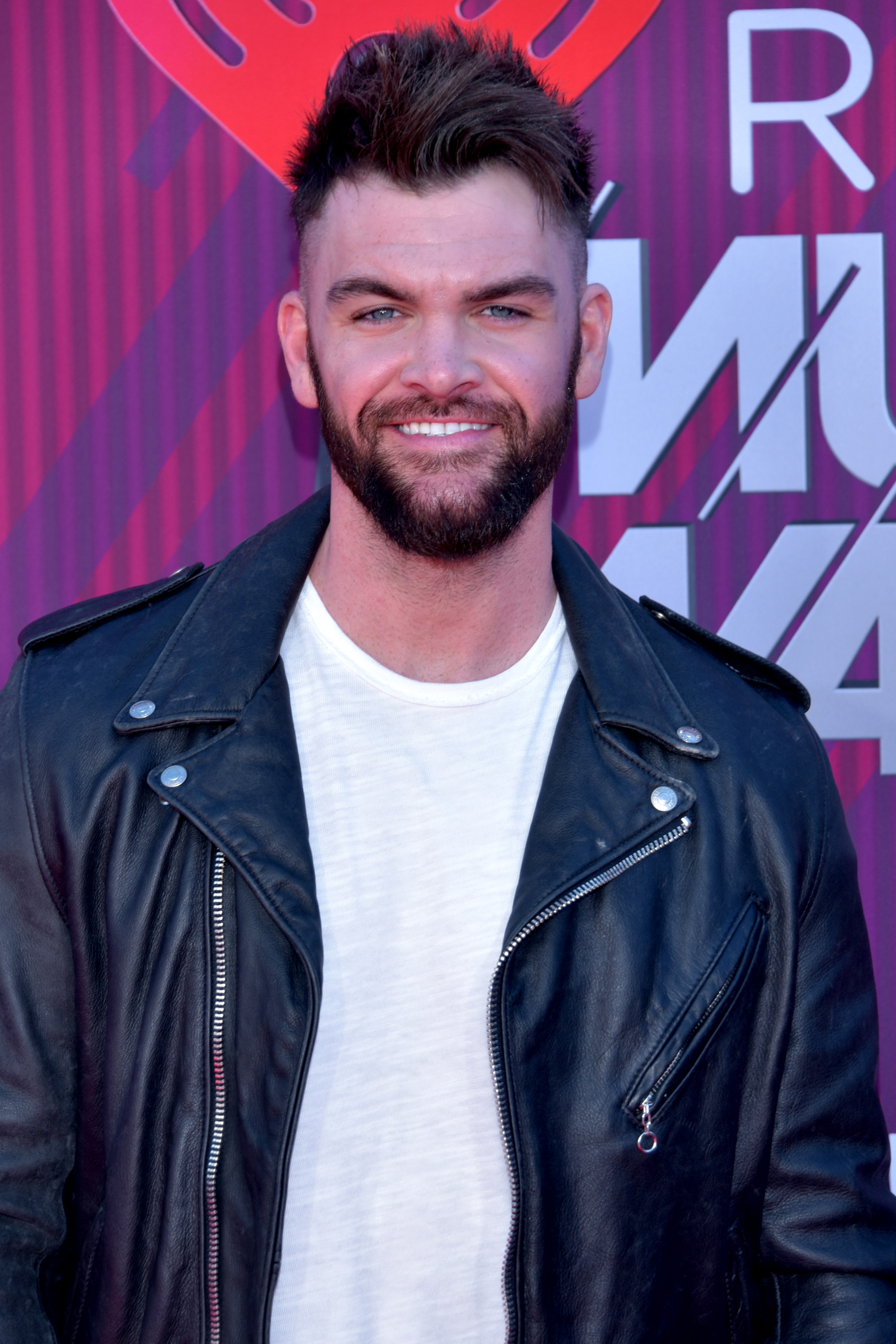
- Scott in 2019

Background information
- Born: Dylan Scott Robinson; October 22, 1990 (age 36); Bastrop, Louisiana, U.S.
- Genre: Country pop
- Occupations: Singer; songwriter
- Instruments: Vocals; guitar; piano
- Years active: 2013–present
- Label: Curb
- Spouse: Blair Robinson (m. 2016)
- Website: dylanscottcountry.com

Dylan Scott Robinson (born October 22, 1990) is an American country music singer and songwriter, better known by his stage name Dylan Scott. He is signed to Curb Records.

== Career ==
Scott's debut single, "Makin' This Boy Go Crazy", was released in June 2013. Billy Dukes of Taste of Country gave the song three and a half stars out of five, writing that "the native Louisianan can really rumble when he reaches down to hit the low notes, but his performance won't leave female fans tingling like the greats." It charted for 10 weeks on the Billboard Country Airplay chart, peaking at number 54 in April 2014. The song's music video premiered on CMT in December 2013.

Scott's second single, "Mmm, Mmm, Mmm", was released in July 2014. Markos Papadatos of Digital Journal gave the song a B+ rating, writing that "the song has a Jake Owen meets Colt Ford vibe to it, especially since he displays his smooth baritone and rap vocals."

Both songs are included on his extended play, Makin' This Boy Go Crazy (also as the self-titled Dylan Scott EP), which was released on February 11, 2014. The EP was produced by Jim Ed Norman. It peaked at number 50 on the Billboard Top Country Albums chart. Another single, "Lay It on Me", came out in late 2014.

Dylan Scott had his first number one record in the summer of 2016 with "My Girl", a song written for his high school sweetheart-now wife, Blair Robinson. "My Girl" is also Scott's first Platinum record, indicating the single has sold 1,000,000 copies.

Scott released his debut studio album, self-titled Dylan Scott, in August 2016. It debuted at number five on the Top Country Albums chart, selling 9,000 copies for the week.

Scott followed up "My Girl" with a number 2 record, "Hooked", from his Dylan Scott album, which was later certified Gold.

Scott released the single "Nothing to Do Town", which was accompanied by a music video and released on December 17, 2018.

In 2019, Scott released an EP titled An Old Memory, containing seven covers of Keith Whitley songs and features a guest appearance from Whitley's widow Lorrie Morgan.

In 2023, Scott performed the national anthem and had a pregame concert prior to the 2023 USFL Championship Game in Canton, Ohio.

== Personal life ==
Scott was born in Louisiana and moved to Nashville at the age of 19.

Scott and his wife, Blair Robinson, live in Nashville with their three children, sons Beckett Scott (born December 12, 2017) and Barron (born September 26, 2023) and daughter Finley Gray (born August 28, 2019).

== Discography ==
=== Studio albums ===
Title	Album details	Peak chart positions			Certifications
Title	Album details	US	US Country	CAN	Certifications
Dylan Scott	Release date: August 12, 2016; Label: Curb	46	5	—	RIAA: Gold
Livin' My Best Life	Release date: August 5, 2022; Label: Curb	60	12	68	RIAA: Platinum
Easy Does It	Release date: May 30, 2025; Label: Curb	—	49	—	

=== Extended plays ===
Title	Details	Peak chart positions		
Title	Details	US	US Country	US Heat
Makin' This Boy Go Crazy (Dylan Scott EP)	Release date: February 11, 2014; Label: Sidewalk	—	50	15
Merry Christmas	Release date: October 13, 2017; Label: Curb Records	—	—	—
Stripped	Release date: October 26, 2018; Label: Curb	—	—	—
Nothing to Do Town	Release date: April 26, 2019; Label: Curb	50	3	—
An Old Memory	Release date: August 16, 2019; Label: Curb	—	—	—
"—" denotes releases that did not chart

=== Singles ===
Year	Title	Peak chart positions						Certifications	Album
Year	Title	US	US Country Songs	US Country Airplay	CAN	CAN Country	NZ Hot	Certifications	Album
2013	"Makin' This Boy Go Crazy"	—	—	54	—	—	—		Makin' This Boy Go Crazy
2014	"Mmm, Mmm, Mmm"	—	—	—	—	—	—		Makin' This Boy Go Crazy
2014	"Lay It On Me"	—	—	—	—	—	—		Dylan Scott
2015	"Crazy Over Me"	—	36	36	—	—	—	RIAA: Gold	Dylan Scott
2016	"My Girl"	39	3	1	—	13	—	RIAA: 3× Platinum	Dylan Scott
2017	"Hooked"	48	6	2	—	14	—	RIAA: Platinum	Dylan Scott
2019	"Nothing to Do Town"	—	35	32	—	—	—	RIAA: Gold	Nothing to Do Town & Livin' My Best Life
2020	"Nobody"	50	5	2	—	23	—	RIAA: Platinum	Nothing to Do Town & Livin' My Best Life
2021	"New Truck"	61	13	1	82	9	—	RIAA: Platinum	Livin' My Best Life
2022	"Can't Have Mine (Find You a Girl)"	57	10	1	95	6	—	RIAA: Platinum	Livin' My Best Life
2023	"Boys Back Home" (with Dylan Marlowe)	75	18	2	—	55	—	RIAA: Platinum; MC: Platinum	Mid-Twenties Crisis & Livin' My Best Life (Still)
2024	"This Town's Been Too Good to Us"	70	17	1	—	39	—	RIAA: Platinum	Livin' My Best Life (Still) & Easy Does It
2025	"What He'll Never Have"	55	16	2	76	8	15	RIAA: Platinum; RMNZ: Gold	Livin' My Best Life (Still) & Easy Does It
2026	"Dear Big City"	—	—	40	—	—	—		Non-album single
"—" denotes releases that did not chart

=== Other charted songs ===
Year	Title	Peak positions		Certifications	Album
Year	Title	US Country Airplay	CAN Country	Certifications	Album
2019	"Santa Claus Is Coming to Town"	60	—		Merry Christmas
2022	"Good Times Go By Too Fast"	—	—	RIAA: Gold	Livin' My Best Life
2025	"Go Tell It on the Mountain" (with Dylan Marlowe)	—	54		Non-album song

=== Music videos ===
Year	Title	Director
2013	"Makin' This Boy Go Crazy"	Rob Dennis
2015	"Crazy Over Me" (version 1)	Chris Young
2016	"Crazy Over Me" (version 2)	Eric Welch
2016	"My Girl"	Eric Welch
2017	"Hooked"	Eric Welch
2018	"Nothing to Do Town"	Eric Welch
2020	"Nobody"	Eric Welch
2021	"New Truck"	Eric Welch
2022	"Can't Have Mine (Find You a Girl)"	Eric Welch
2024	"Boys Back Home" (with Dylan Marlowe)	Tristan Cusick
2024	"This Town's Been Too Good to Us"	Cameron Packee
