= World on Fire (Nate Smith song) =

Single by Nate Smith

from the album Nate Smith (Deluxe)
- Released: June 5, 2023
- Genre: Country; country rock
- Length: 3:11
- Label: RCA Nashville
- Songwriters: Nate Smith; Ashley Gorley; Taylor Phillips; Lindsay Rimes
- Producer: Lindsay Rimes

Nate Smith singles chronology
"Whiskey on You" (2022)	"World on Fire" (2023)	"Bulletproof" (2024)

Alternate single cover
- "Bonfire version" cover

Music video
- "World on Fire" on YouTube

"World on Fire" is a song by American country music singer Nate Smith, written by Smith, Ashley Gorley, Taylor Phillips and Lindsay Rimes. It was released on June 5, 2023, as the second single from his self-titled debut album.

== History ==
The idea for the song "World on Fire" came during a songwriting session among Nate Smith, Ashley Gorley, Lindsay Rimes, and Taylor Phillips. Phillips, who is also a volunteer firefighter, came up with the title "world on fire" after using that phrase to recount a fire at a construction site. He then thought the idea of a narrator's world being "on fire" would convey the end of a relationship. Smith, meanwhile, was inspired to build on the idea as he remembered the Camp Fire, a wildfire that affected his hometown of Paradise, California, in 2018. Rimes then recorded the demo, which featured multiple guitar tracks from him and guitarist Sol Philcox-Littlefield; Rimes told Billboard that his inspiration for the arrangement was the work of the Foo Fighters. As Smith had already submitted the master tracks for his album to his label, he could not add the song without overriding pre-sale sales figures. As a result, the label chose to issue a deluxe version, with "World on Fire" and five other tracks, which would be released the same day as the regular version of the album.

== Music video ==
Smith released a music video on July 12, 2023, directed by Chris Ashlee. The video features Smith singing the song as a fire occurs around him.

As of March 2025, the music video for "World on Fire" has over 13 million views on YouTube.

== Chart performance ==
The song reached number 21 on the US Billboard Hot 100 and became Smith's second number one hit on the Country Airplay chart for the week of December 23, 2023, spending 10 consecutive weeks there until it was dethroned by Warren Zeiders's "Pretty Little Poison" on the chart dated March 2, 2024. The song's 10-week run at the top tied a record with Morgan Wallen's 2022 single "You Proof" for the longest-running number one single in the chart's history. In December 2024, Billboard year-end declared "World on Fire" the number one song of the year on the Country Airplay chart.

== Charts ==
=== Weekly charts ===
Weekly chart performance for "World on Fire"
Chart (2023–2024)	Peak position
Australia Digital Tracks (ARIA)	30
Australia Country Hot 50 (The Music)	14
Canada (Canadian Hot 100)	39
Canada Country (Billboard)	1
UK Country Airplay (Radiomonitor)	15
US Billboard Hot 100	21
US Hot Country Songs (Billboard)	6
US Country Airplay (Billboard)	1

=== Year-end charts ===
Year-end chart performance for "World on Fire"
Chart (2023)	Position
US Hot Country Songs (Billboard)	67

Chart (2024)	Position
US Billboard Hot 100	90
US Hot Country Songs (Billboard)	32
US Country Airplay (Billboard)	1

== Certifications ==
Certifications for "World on Fire"
Region	Certification	Certified units/sales
Canada (Music Canada)	Platinum	80,000^{‡}
United Kingdom (BPI)	Silver	200,000^{‡}
United States (RIAA)	Platinum	1,000,000^{‡}
^{‡} Sales+streaming figures based on certification alone.
