= Nate Smith (singer) =

American country music singer (born 1985)

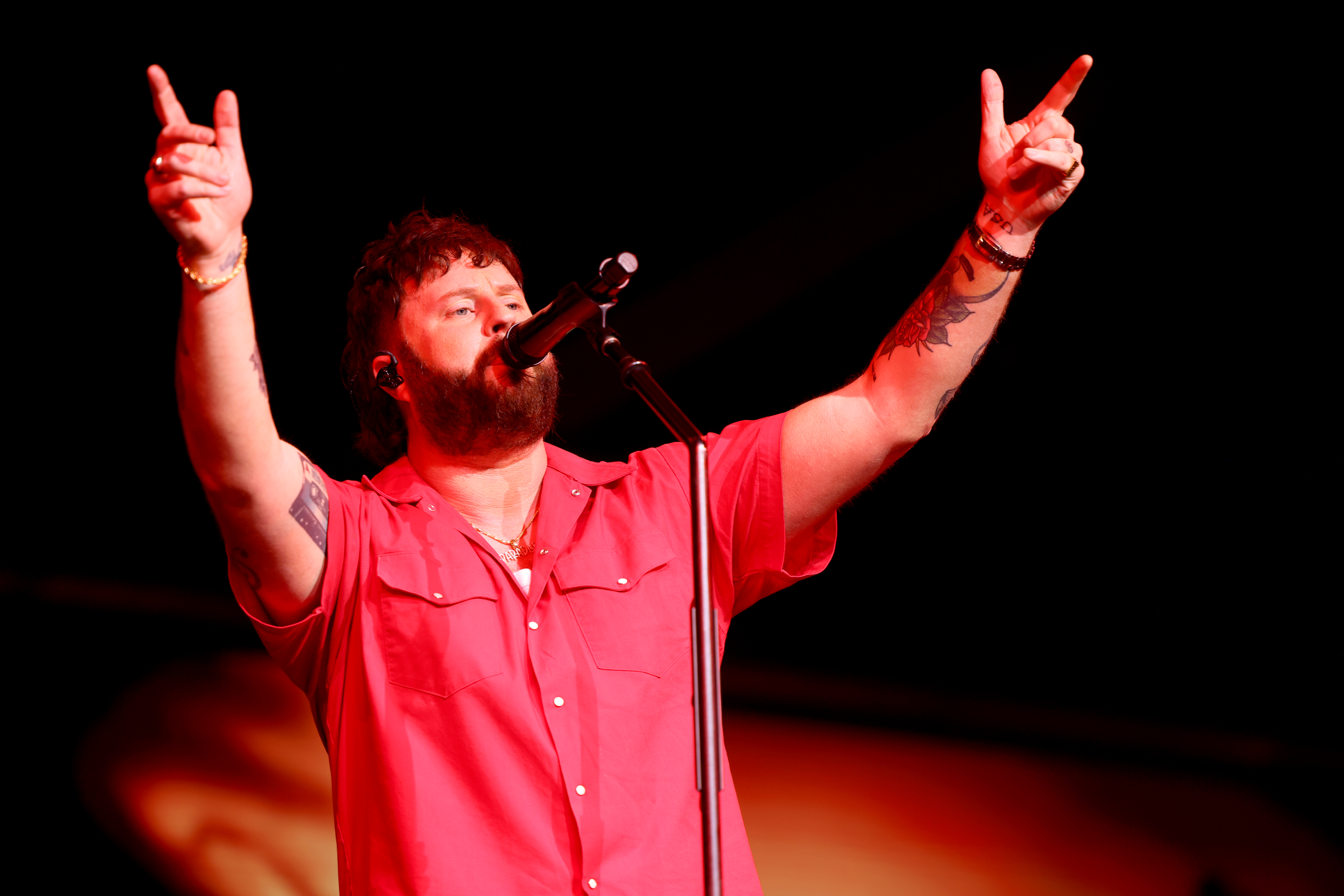
- Smith in 2025

Background information
- Born: Nathaniel Dean Smith; September 19, 1985 (age 41); Paradise, California, U.S.
- Genres: Country, country rock
- Occupation: Singer-songwriter
- Instruments: Vocals, guitar
- Years active: 2018–present
- Labels: Word; Arista Nashville; RCA Nashville
- Website: natesmithofficial.com

Nathaniel Dean Smith (born September 19, 1985) is an American country music singer signed to Sony Music Nashville. After his song "Wildfire" went viral on TikTok in 2020, he signed a publishing deal with Sony/ATV. He gained prominence on social media before landing his major label record deal. He was previously signed to Word Records.

== Early life and career ==
Born and raised in Paradise, California, Smith was introduced to performing music by his church youth leader and cites Garth Brooks, Tom Petty, and Fleetwood Mac as his early influences. After moving to Nashville at age 23, he signed a record deal with Word Records and a publishing deal with Centricity Music. During this time, he opened for artists including Brett Eldredge, Eli Young Band, and X Ambassadors. Smith performed at "Wild West Festival" in Hays, Kansas in summer of 2024.

After returning to Paradise, California, in 2018, Smith's home burned down in the Butte County Camp Fire. The tragedy inspired him to write his breakout song "One of These Days". News of the release was reported by local press and several national outlets including NPR, which encouraged Smith to return to Nashville and continue pursuing music.

After relocating, Smith released his next single, "Wildfire". A clip of the performer singing his track went viral on the social media platform TikTok, gaining over 3 million views. A few months later, in November 2021, Smith signed a record deal with Sony Music Nashville and dropped his major label debut, "Raised Up", which he co-wrote with hit songwriter Jonathan Smith. He soon followed it with "I Don't Wanna Go to Heaven". The track helped land him on 2022 Artists to Watch lists by Country Now, Country Lifestyle Network and PopWrapped.

After Arista Nashville closed in March 2023, Smith was reassigned to RCA Records' Nashville division. The song "Bulletproof" was released on February 2, 2024, as the lead single from Smith's EP Through the Smoke. The song was subsequently re-recorded featuring Avril Lavigne. This version was released on May 16, 2024.

"Can You Die from a Broken Heart", was released on September 30, 2024, four days ahead of the California Gold's release. The song features vocals by Avril Lavigne, who had previously collaborated with Smith in May 2024.

In September 2025, Smith came out as a supporter of Donald Trump. He stated that the assassination of conservative activist Charlie Kirk inspired him to be more public about his political beliefs.

== Discography ==
=== Studio albums ===
List of studio albums, with selected details and chart positions
Title	Details	Peak chart positions			Certifications
Title	Details	US	US Country	CAN	Certifications
Nate Smith	Released: April 28, 2023; Label: Arista Nashville; Formats: CD, download	30	6	24	RIAA: Gold; MC: Platinum
California Gold	Released: October 4, 2024; Label: Sony Music; Formats: CD, download	65	12	45	

=== EPs ===
EP, with selected details
Title	Details
Reckless	Released: May 8, 2020; Label: The Fuel Music; Formats: Streaming Platforms, Digital Downloads
Through the Smoke	Released: April 5, 2024; Label: Sony Music; Formats: Digital download

=== Singles ===
List of singles, with selected chart positions and certifications
Title	Year	Peak positions						Certifications	Album
Title	Year	US	US Country Songs	US Country Airplay	CAN	CAN Country	NZ Hot	Certifications	Album
"Whiskey on You"	2022	43	11	1	—	1	—	RIAA: 3× Platinum; MC: 2× Platinum; RMNZ: Gold	Nate Smith
"World on Fire"	2023	21	6	1	39	1	—	RIAA: Platinum; MC: Platinum; RMNZ: Gold	Nate Smith
"Bulletproof"	2024	37	10	3	52	3	20	RIAA: Platinum; MC: Platinum	California Gold
"Drinkin' Buddies" (with Lee Brice and Hailey Whitters)	2024	—	—	26	—	59	—		Sunriser
"I Like It" (with Alesso)	2024	—	—	—	60	—	—		California Gold
"Can You Die from a Broken Heart" (featuring Avril Lavigne)	2024	— (Note: "Can You Die from a Broken Heart" did not enter the Billboard Hot 100, but peaked at number two on the Bubbling Under Hot 100 chart.)	29	—	—	—	—		California Gold
"Fix What You Didn't Break"	2024	52	14	2	71	39	27		California Gold
"After Midnight" (featuring Tyler Hubbard)	2025	—	—	24	—	34	33		Non-album single
"Find Me in a Bar"	2026	—	—	—	—	—	—		Non-album single

=== Promotional singles ===
List of promotional singles, with selected chart positions and certifications
Title	Year	Peak positions			Certifications	Album
Title	Year	US	US Country	NZ Hot	Certifications	Album
"Wildfire"	2019	—	—	—		Reckless
"Reckless"	2020	—	—	—		Reckless
"Under My Skin"	2020	—	—	—	RIAA: Gold	Nate Smith
"Sleeve"	2021	—	—	—		Nate Smith
"Heart of a Country Song"	2021	—	—	—		Non-album single
"Raised Up"	2021	—	—	—		Nate Smith
"I Don't Wanna Go to Heaven"	2021	—	—	—	MC: Gold	Nate Smith
"I Found You"	2022	—	—	—		Nate Smith
"Wreckage"	2022	69	20	—	RIAA: Platinum	Nate Smith
"Better Boy"	2023	—	—	—		Nate Smith
"Chasing Cars"	2023	—	—	—		Nate Smith
"Nobody Likes Your Girlfriend" (with Hardy)	2025	— (Note: "Nobody Likes Your Girlfriend" did not enter the Billboard Hot 100, but peaked at number 19 on the Bubbling Under Hot 100 chart.)	29	37		Non-album single
"Dads Don't Die"	2025	—	—	—		TBA

=== Other certified songs ===
Title	Year	Certifications	Album
"Wish I Never Felt"	2024	MC: Gold	California Gold

=== Unreleased songs ===
Title	D / M / Y	Latest Updates
"Rooftops"	Nov 1, 2024	N/A
"Navigator"	Dec 18, 2024	N/A
"Whiskey In My Blood"	Dec 26, 2024	N/A
"Nights These Days"	Mar 20, 2025	Sounded similar to 'Favourite County Song' by Michael Hardy
"Your Love Is Like A Drug"	July 24, 2025	N/A
"Sad Songs"	Aug 2, 2025	N/A
"Pray"	Dec 7, 2025	
"Break Up Like That"	Jun 5, 2026	Released In October 2026
"Sleeping With"	May 19, 2026	N/A
"Find Me In A Bar"	May 20, 2026	Released in September 2026
"Drinking Song"	May 21, 2026	
"Til I Can't"	Sep 18, 2026	TBC - Releasing Soon
