= Whiskey on You =

2022 single by Nate Smith

Single by Nate Smith

from the album Nate Smith
- Released: June 27, 2022
- Genre: Country rock
- Length: 3:04
- Label: Arista Nashville
- Songwriters: Nate Smith; Russell Sutton; Lindsay Rimes
- Producer: Lindsay Rimes

Nate Smith singles chronology
| "Whiskey on You" (2022) | "World on Fire" (2023) |

Music video
- "Whiskey on You" on YouTube

"Whiskey on You" is a song by American country music singer Nate Smith. It was released on June 27, 2022 as the first single from his self-titled debut album (2023).

It became Smith's first song to peak atop the Billboard charts, topping the Country Airplay and Canada Country charts. It also became his first to chart on the Billboard Hot 100, peaking at number 43. Internationally, it peaked at number 36 on the UK Singles Sales Chart and number 5 on the ARIA Digital Track Chart, becoming his first song to chart overseas.

== History ==
Smith attended a songwriting retreat with Lindsay Rimes and Russell Sutton in 2022. He recorded a demo of the song in the kitchen of music executive Jim Catino. Smith attempted to make a full version of the song in the studio, but after being unable to find a suitable recording there, he and Rimes decided to use the vocal track from the demo in the final recording.

== Music video ==
The song also received a music video directed by Chris Ashlee, portraying the song's central theme of a breakup.

== Charts ==
=== Weekly charts ===
Weekly chart performance
| Chart (2022–23) | Peak position |
|---|---|
| Australia Digital Tracks (ARIA) | 5 |
| Canada Country (Billboard) | 1 |
| New Zealand Hot Singles (RMNZ) | 19 |
| UK Singles Downloads (OCC) | 35 |
| UK Singles Sales (OCC) | 36 |
| US Billboard Hot 100 | 43 |
| US Hot Country Songs (Billboard) | 11 |
| US Country Airplay (Billboard) | 1 |

=== Year-end charts ===
Year-end chart performance
| Chart (2022) | Position |
|---|---|
| US Hot Country Songs (Billboard) | 34 |

| Chart (2023) | Position |
|---|---|
| US Hot Country Songs (Billboard) | 46 |
| US Country Airplay (Billboard) | 23 |
| US Radio Songs (Billboard) | 61 |

== Certifications ==
Certifications for "Whiskey on You"
| Region | Certification | Certified units/sales |
|---|---|---|
| Canada (Music Canada) | 2× Platinum | 160,000^{‡} |
| New Zealand (RMNZ) | Gold | 15,000^{‡} |
| United States (RIAA) | Platinum | 1,000,000^{‡} |
^{‡} Sales+streaming figures based on certification alone.
