= List of Billboard number-one country songs of 2018 =

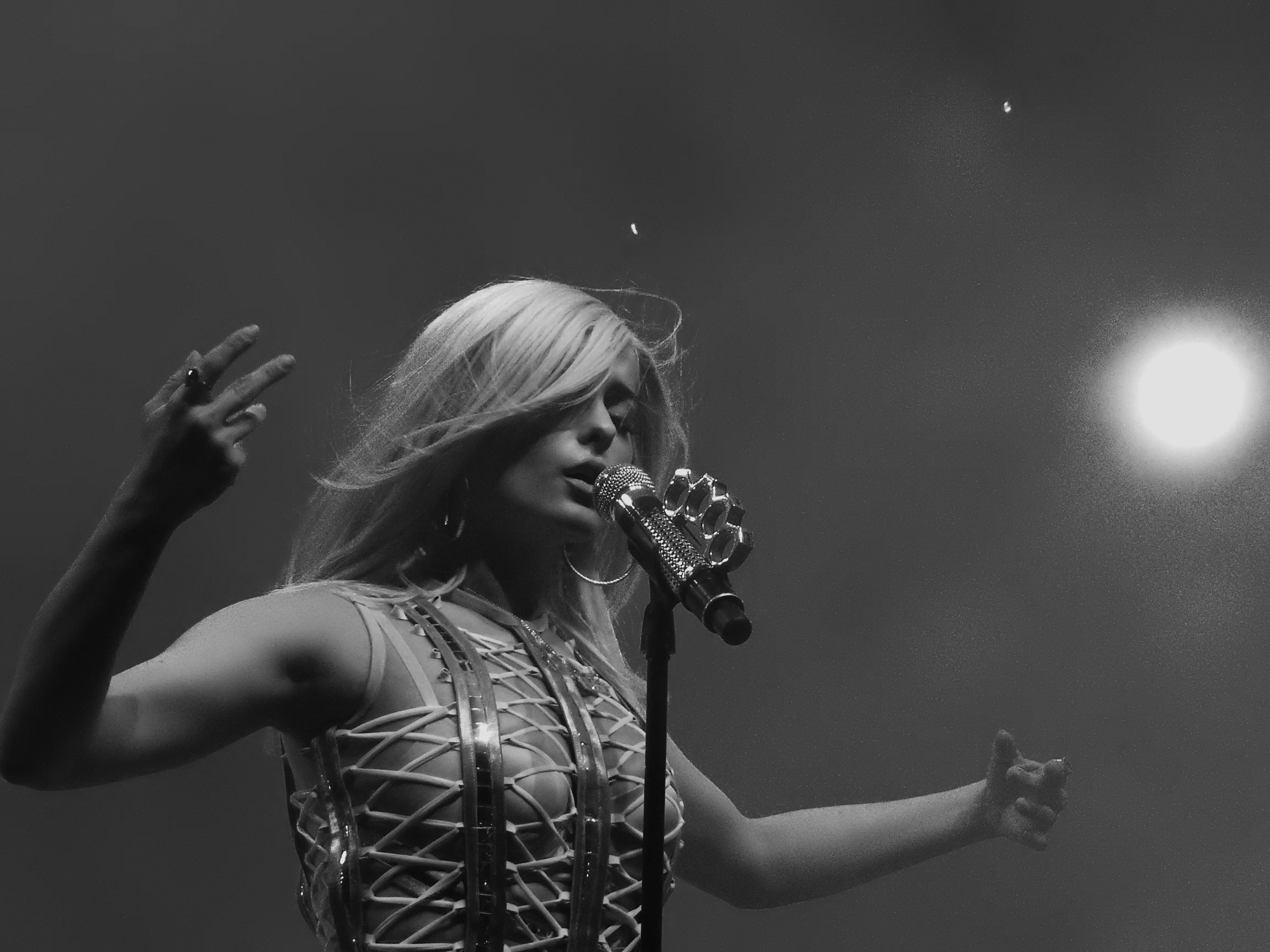
With the issue of Billboard dated August 4, 2018, "Meant to Be" by Bebe Rexha (pictured) and Florida Georgia Line broke the record for the longest run at number one on the Hot Country Songs chart, having been in the top spot for 35 weeks. The song's run at number one ultimately extended to 50 weeks at the top.

Hot Country Songs and Country Airplay are charts that rank the top-performing country music songs in the United States, published by Billboard magazine. Hot Country Songs ranks songs based on digital downloads, streaming, and airplay not only from country stations but from stations of all formats, a methodology introduced in 2012. Country Airplay, which was published for the first time in 2012, is based solely on country radio airplay, a methodology which had previously been used for several decades for Hot Country Songs. In 2018, three different songs topped the Hot Country Songs chart and 33 different songs topped Country Airplay.

The Country Airplay chart began the year with "Like I Loved You" by Brett Young holding the top position, while "Meant to Be" by Bebe Rexha and Florida Georgia Line held the number one spot on Hot Country Songs, continuing a run that had begun on the chart dated December 16, 2017. When "Meant to Be" spent an eleventh week in the top spot in February, it overtook Taylor Swift's "We Are Never Ever Getting Back Together" as the longest-running number one song on the chart for a lead female artist. In August, the song spent a 35th consecutive week in the top spot and broke the record previously held by 2017's "Body Like a Back Road" by Sam Hunt for the most weeks at number one on the chart. "Meant to Be" ultimately held the top spot on the Hot Country Songs listing until the issue of Billboard dated November 24, 2018, when it was replaced at number one after 50 weeks by "Lose It" by Kane Brown. This was the second number one for Brown after "What Ifs", which had coincidentally ended Hunt's then-record run the previous year. The longest-tenured number one single on Country Airplay in 2018 was "She Got the Best of Me" by Luke Combs, with four weeks spent at the top.

Several artists achieved their first career number ones by virtue of topping the Country Airplay chart in 2018. Russell Dickerson had his first number one with "Yours" on the chart dated January 27, Scotty McCreery with "Five More Minutes" on the chart dated March 3, Jordan Davis with "Singles You Up" on the chart dated April 21, Morgan Wallen with "Up Down" on June 30, and Jimmie Allen with "Best Shot" on November 24. "Best Shot" also made Allen the second African-American country artist to reach number one with a debut single, ten years after Darius Rucker topped Hot Country Songs with his first single. In the issue of Billboard dated December 15, Allen's song became the first since 2008 to drop from number one and then regain the top spot on a chart based on country radio airplay. In addition, Maren Morris had her first solo number-one single with "I Could Use a Love Song" on the chart dated January 20, after having previously topped the chart as a featured artist on Thomas Rhett's "Craving You" in July 2017, and Chris Stapleton and Bebe Rexha reached the number one spot on Country Airplay for the first time, having previously topped Hot Country Songs. In June, David Lee Murphy had his first chart-topping single for more than two decades when "Everything's Gonna Be Alright", a duet with Kenny Chesney, topped the airplay-based chart. Murphy had last achieved a number one with "Dust on the Bottle" in 1995.

== Chart history ==
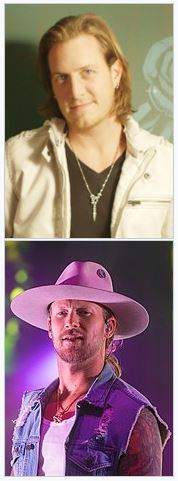
Florida Georgia Line (Tyler Hubbard, top, and Brian Kelley) collaborated with Bebe Rexha on the record-breaking number one "Meant to Be". In doing so, they took their total number of weeks spent at number one on the Hot Country Songs chart past 100.

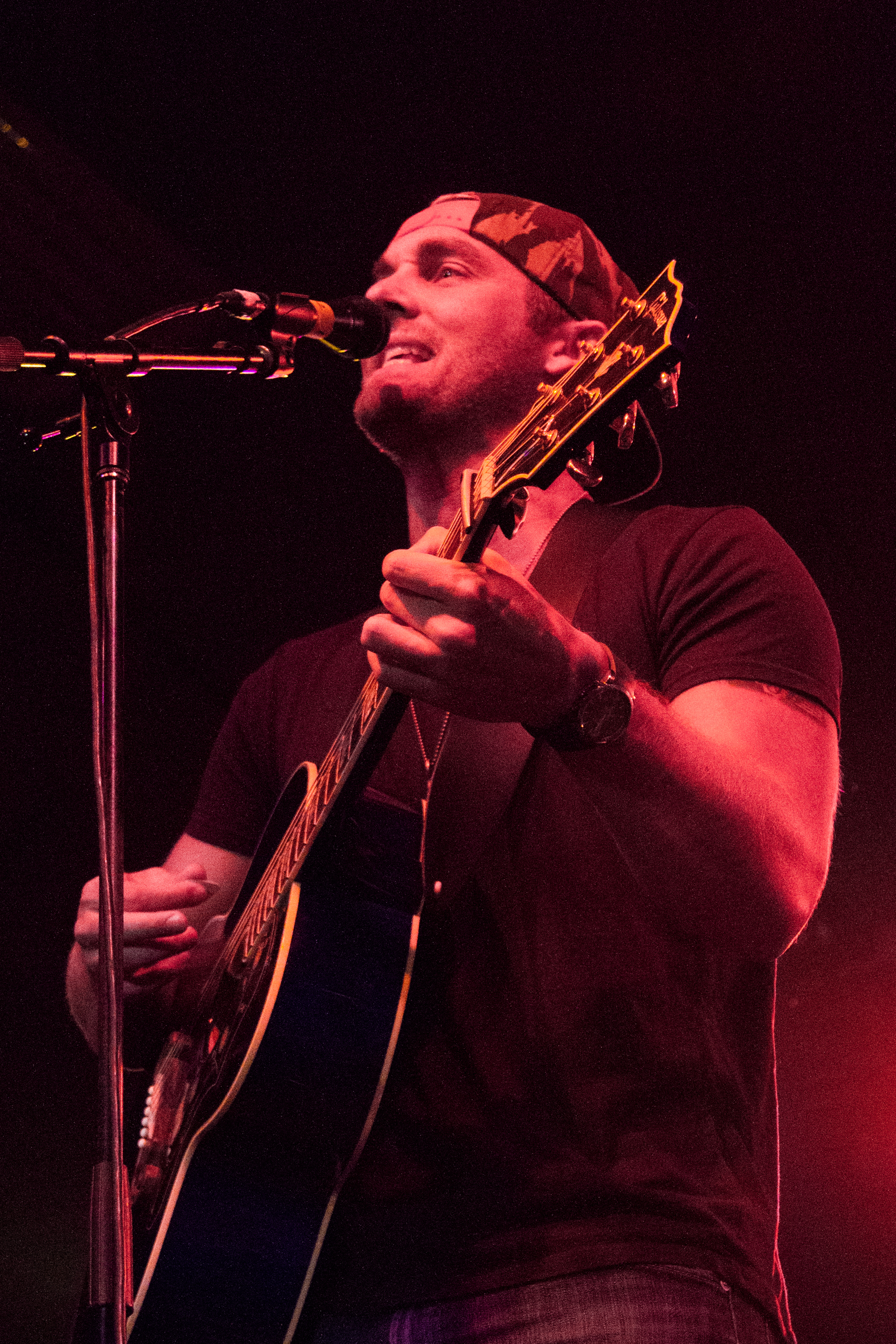
Brett Young began the year at number one on the airplay chart and was one of three artists to spend five weeks in the top spot during 2018.

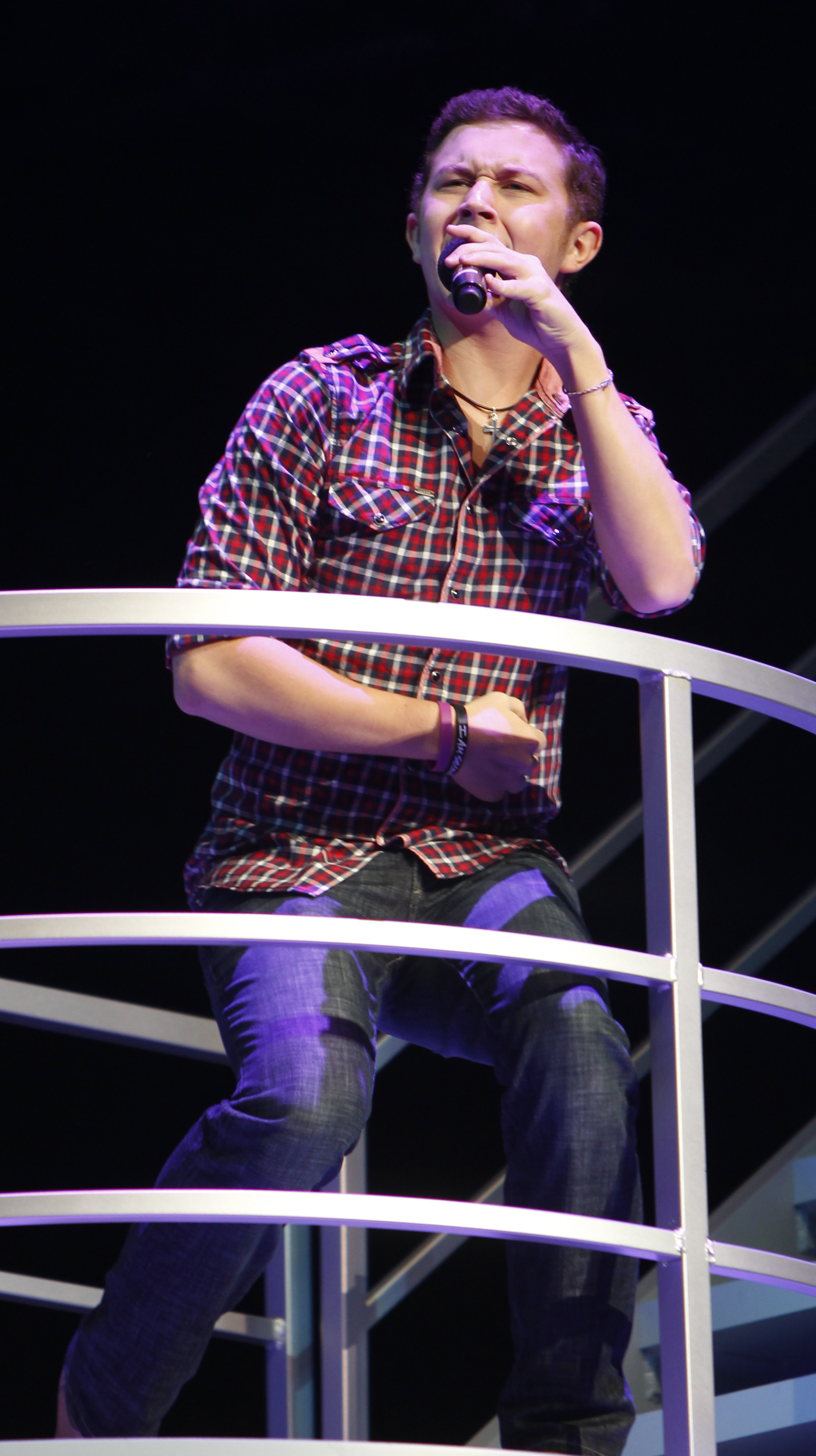
"Five More Minutes" gave Scotty McCreery his first number one.

Chart history
Issue date	Hot Country Songs			Country Airplay		
Issue date	Title	Artist(s)	Ref.	Title	Artist(s)	Ref.
January 3^{[a]}	"Meant to Be"	Bebe Rexha and Florida Georgia Line		"Like I Loved You"	Brett Young	
January 6^{[a]}	"Meant to Be"	Bebe Rexha and Florida Georgia Line		"Like I Loved You"	Brett Young	
January 13	"Meant to Be"	Bebe Rexha and Florida Georgia Line		"Like I Loved You"	Brett Young	
January 20	"Meant to Be"	Bebe Rexha and Florida Georgia Line		"I Could Use a Love Song"	Maren Morris	
January 27	"Meant to Be"	Bebe Rexha and Florida Georgia Line		"Yours"	Russell Dickerson	
February 3	"Meant to Be"	Bebe Rexha and Florida Georgia Line		"Yours"	Russell Dickerson	
February 10	"Meant to Be"	Bebe Rexha and Florida Georgia Line		"Losing Sleep"	Chris Young	
February 17	"Meant to Be"	Bebe Rexha and Florida Georgia Line		"Written in the Sand"	Old Dominion	
February 24	"Meant to Be"	Bebe Rexha and Florida Georgia Line		"Legends"	Kelsea Ballerini	
March 3	"Meant to Be"	Bebe Rexha and Florida Georgia Line		"Five More Minutes"	Scotty McCreery	
March 10	"Meant to Be"	Bebe Rexha and Florida Georgia Line		"Marry Me"	Thomas Rhett	
March 17	"Meant to Be"	Bebe Rexha and Florida Georgia Line		"Marry Me"	Thomas Rhett	
March 24	"Meant to Be"	Bebe Rexha and Florida Georgia Line		"Broken Halos"	Chris Stapleton	
March 31	"Meant to Be"	Bebe Rexha and Florida Georgia Line		"Most People Are Good"	Luke Bryan	
April 7	"Meant to Be"	Bebe Rexha and Florida Georgia Line		"Most People Are Good"	Luke Bryan	
April 14	"Meant to Be"	Bebe Rexha and Florida Georgia Line		"Most People Are Good"	Luke Bryan	
April 21	"Meant to Be"	Bebe Rexha and Florida Georgia Line		"Singles You Up"	Jordan Davis	
April 28	"Meant to Be"	Bebe Rexha and Florida Georgia Line		"Meant to Be"	Bebe Rexha and Florida Georgia Line	
May 5	"Meant to Be"	Bebe Rexha and Florida Georgia Line		"You Make It Easy"	Jason Aldean	
May 12	"Meant to Be"	Bebe Rexha and Florida Georgia Line		"You Make It Easy"	Jason Aldean	
May 19	"Meant to Be"	Bebe Rexha and Florida Georgia Line		"Heaven"	Kane Brown	
May 26	"Meant to Be"	Bebe Rexha and Florida Georgia Line		"Heaven"	Kane Brown	
June 2	"Meant to Be"	Bebe Rexha and Florida Georgia Line		"For the First Time"	Darius Rucker	
June 9	"Meant to Be"	Bebe Rexha and Florida Georgia Line		"One Number Away"	Luke Combs	
June 16	"Meant to Be"	Bebe Rexha and Florida Georgia Line		"Woman, Amen"	Dierks Bentley	
June 23	"Meant to Be"	Bebe Rexha and Florida Georgia Line		"Everything's Gonna Be Alright"	David Lee Murphy and Kenny Chesney	
June 30	"Meant to Be"	Bebe Rexha and Florida Georgia Line		"Up Down"	Morgan Wallen featuring Florida Georgia Line	
July 7	"Meant to Be"	Bebe Rexha and Florida Georgia Line		"Tequila"	Dan + Shay	
July 14	"Meant to Be"	Bebe Rexha and Florida Georgia Line		"Tequila"	Dan + Shay	
July 21	"Meant to Be"	Bebe Rexha and Florida Georgia Line		"Get Along"	Kenny Chesney	
July 28	"Meant to Be"	Bebe Rexha and Florida Georgia Line		"Get Along"	Kenny Chesney	
August 4	"Meant to Be"	Bebe Rexha and Florida Georgia Line		"I Was Jack (You Were Diane)"	Jake Owen	
August 11	"Meant to Be"	Bebe Rexha and Florida Georgia Line		"Mercy"	Brett Young	
August 18	"Meant to Be"	Bebe Rexha and Florida Georgia Line		"Mercy"	Brett Young	
August 25	"Meant to Be"	Bebe Rexha and Florida Georgia Line		"Drowns the Whiskey"	Jason Aldean featuring Miranda Lambert	
September 1	"Meant to Be"	Bebe Rexha and Florida Georgia Line		"Drowns the Whiskey"	Jason Aldean featuring Miranda Lambert	
September 8	"Meant to Be"	Bebe Rexha and Florida Georgia Line		"Life Changes"	Thomas Rhett	
September 15	"Meant to Be"	Bebe Rexha and Florida Georgia Line		"Sunrise, Sunburn, Sunset"	Luke Bryan	
September 22	"Meant to Be"	Bebe Rexha and Florida Georgia Line		"Sunrise, Sunburn, Sunset"	Luke Bryan	
September 29	"Meant to Be"	Bebe Rexha and Florida Georgia Line		"Hotel Key"	Old Dominion	
October 6	"Meant to Be"	Bebe Rexha and Florida Georgia Line		"Hotel Key"	Old Dominion	
October 13	"Meant to Be"	Bebe Rexha and Florida Georgia Line		"Blue Tacoma"	Russell Dickerson	
October 20	"Meant to Be"	Bebe Rexha and Florida Georgia Line		"Simple"	Florida Georgia Line	
October 27	"Meant to Be"	Bebe Rexha and Florida Georgia Line		"She Got the Best of Me"	Luke Combs	
November 3	"Meant to Be"	Bebe Rexha and Florida Georgia Line		"She Got the Best of Me"	Luke Combs	
November 10	"Meant to Be"	Bebe Rexha and Florida Georgia Line		"She Got the Best of Me"	Luke Combs	
November 17	"Meant to Be"	Bebe Rexha and Florida Georgia Line		"She Got the Best of Me"	Luke Combs	
November 24	"Lose It"	Kane Brown		"Best Shot"	Jimmie Allen	
December 1	"Speechless"	Dan + Shay		"Best Shot"	Jimmie Allen	
December 8	"Speechless"	Dan + Shay		"Lose It"	Kane Brown	
December 15	"Speechless"	Dan + Shay		"Best Shot"	Jimmie Allen	
December 22	"Speechless"	Dan + Shay		"Speechless"	Dan + Shay	
December 29	"Speechless"	Dan + Shay		"Speechless"	Dan + Shay	

Notes

a. Due to a change in Billboard's chart dating policy, the first chart of 2018 was dated January 3, four days after the previous one, and another chart was released dated January 6.

== See also ==
- 2018 in music
- List of artists who reached number one on the U.S. country chart
- List of number-one country albums of 2018 (U.S.)
