= Death Row (song) =

2022 song by Thomas Rhett, Tyler Hubbard, and Russell Dickerson

Promotional single by Thomas Rhett featuring Tyler Hubbard and Russell Dickerson

from the album Where We Started
- Released: March 4, 2022
- Genre: Country
- Length: 3:51
- Label: Valory
- Songwriters: Ashley Gorley; Thomas Rhett; Zach Crowell
- Producers: Dann Huff; Jesse Frasure

Thomas Rhett chronology
"Slow Down Summer" (2021)	"Death Row" (2022)	"Praise the Lord" (2022)

Tyler Hubbard chronology
Undivided (2021)	Death Row (2022)	5 Foot 9 (2022)

Russell Dickerson chronology
Home Sweet (2021)	Death Row (2022)	She Likes It (2022)

Music video
- "Death Row" on YouTube

"Death Row" is a song by American country music singer Thomas Rhett, featuring Tyler Hubbard and Russell Dickerson. It was released on March 4, 2022, as a promotional single from Rhett's sixth studio album, Where We Started. The song was written by Rhett, Ashley Gorley, and Zach Crowell, and produced by Dann Huff and Jesse Frasure. The song was inspired after the artists performed for men on death row.

== Background ==
In 2019, Rhett, Hubbard, and Dickerson went to visit a men's prison in Nashville where they performed for about thirty people on death row during Christmastime. They were invited by their friend, Al Andrews, who does prison ministry. During the visit, one man sang "Amazing Grace", which Rhett described as "a strange spiritual experience" that "put life into such a weird perspective" and reminded him of the fragility of life. Dickerson stated that the day changed their lives and described the experience as "humbling, raw and a total God moment." Hubbard said the experience was "extremely encouraging and eye-opening and fulfilling." Hubbard noted "We just wanted to serve and invest into these guys' lives, and it turns out it felt like we left there and they invested in our life."

Shortly after their visit, Rhett was finishing up a co-writing session with Ashley Gorley and Zach Crowell when he brought up his experience visiting death row and they ended up writing a song about his experience. Rhett did not expect to put the song on one of his albums and said it was "terrifying" to put the song on Where We Started. Of the songwriting experience, Rhett stated "For me, it was just a therapy session, and the only way I knew how to put into words what that day meant." Rhett sent the song to Hubbard and Dickerson to get their approval and to fact-check the experience. Later, family and friends encouraged Rhett to record the song, so he reached out to Hubbard and Dickerson, who agreed to sing on the song.

In August 2020, Rhett, Hubbard, and Dickerson released video clips of the song on Instagram. The song was released on March 4, 2022, as the fifth single of the album.

== Videos ==
The song and lyric video were released on March 4, 2022. The lyric video, which was released on Rhett's YouTube page, features Rhett, Hubbard, and Dickerson playing guitar by themselves with superimposed lyrics. Rhett also released a video on his YouTube page titled "Death Row (Story Behind The Song)". In the video, Rhett describes their visit to death row, the impact that the visit had on him, and the process of writing the song.

== Critical reception ==
Stephen Thomas Erlewine of AllMusic criticized "Death Row" for its lyrics and Hubbard's vocals.

Charley Conroy, in The Heights wrote that "Death Row" "includes Rhett's most striking lyricism and storytelling of any song on the album."
