= List of Top Country Albums number ones of 2018 =

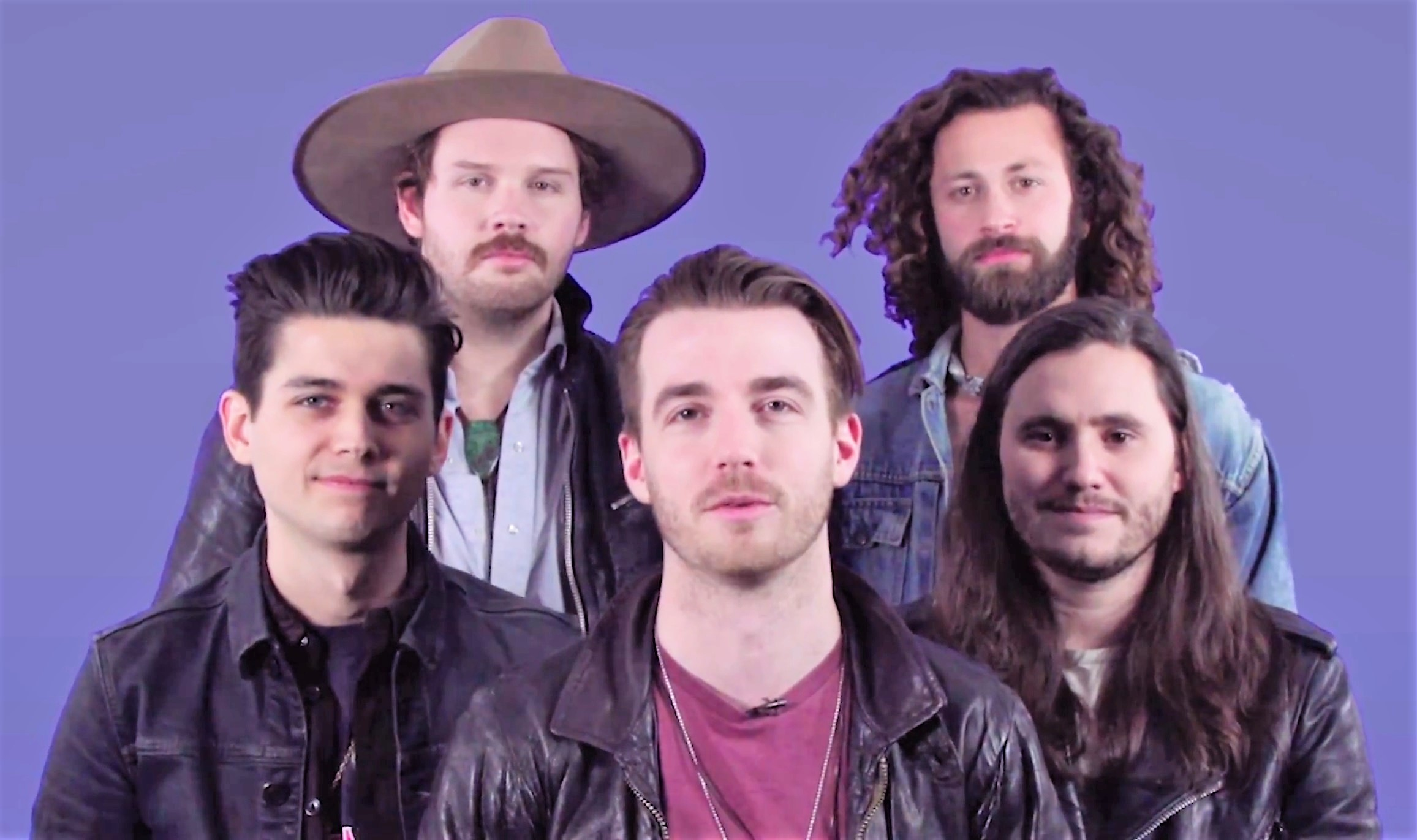
Lanco reached number one with its debut album Hallelujah Nights.

Top Country Albums is a chart that ranks the top-performing country music albums in the United States, published by Billboard. In 2018, 19 different albums topped the chart, based on multi-metric consumption, blending traditional album sales, track equivalent albums, and streaming equivalent albums.

In the issue of Billboard dated January 3, Luke Bryan was at number one with the album What Makes You Country, its second week in the top spot. The following week it was displaced by The Anthology Part I: The First Five Years by Garth Brooks, in an issue which was dated January 6 after Billboard changed its issue dating system. One week after that, Kane Brown returned to number one with his eponymous debut album, which had spent a single week in the top spot in 2016 and a second in 2017. The album's total of 10 non-consecutive weeks atop the chart was the second highest achieved in 2018, and its second spell at number one, which lasted for four weeks, tied for the year's longest unbroken run in the top spot. Later in the year Brown's second album Experiment spent a single week at number one, making him the only act with more than one chart-topper in 2018. The band Lanco matched the feat which Brown had achieved in 2016 by topping the chart with its debut album, spending a single week at number one in January with Hallelujah Nights.

In June, the album This One's for You by Luke Combs returned to number one; it had spent four weeks in the top spot following its original release the previous summer, but went back to the peak position a year later following the release of a deluxe edition with additional tracks. The album made intermittent returns to number one throughout the remainder of the year, adding a further 17 weeks to its total. Its popularity would continue for much of 2019, and it would eventually achieve a total of 50 weeks atop the listing, tying the record set by Shania Twain's album Come On Over for the highest total number of weeks at number one on the Top Country Albums chart. Three of 2018's Top Country Albums number ones also topped the all-genre Billboard 200 chart: Jason Aldean's Rearview Town, Carrie Underwood's Cry Pretty, and Kane Brown's Experiment.

== Chart history ==
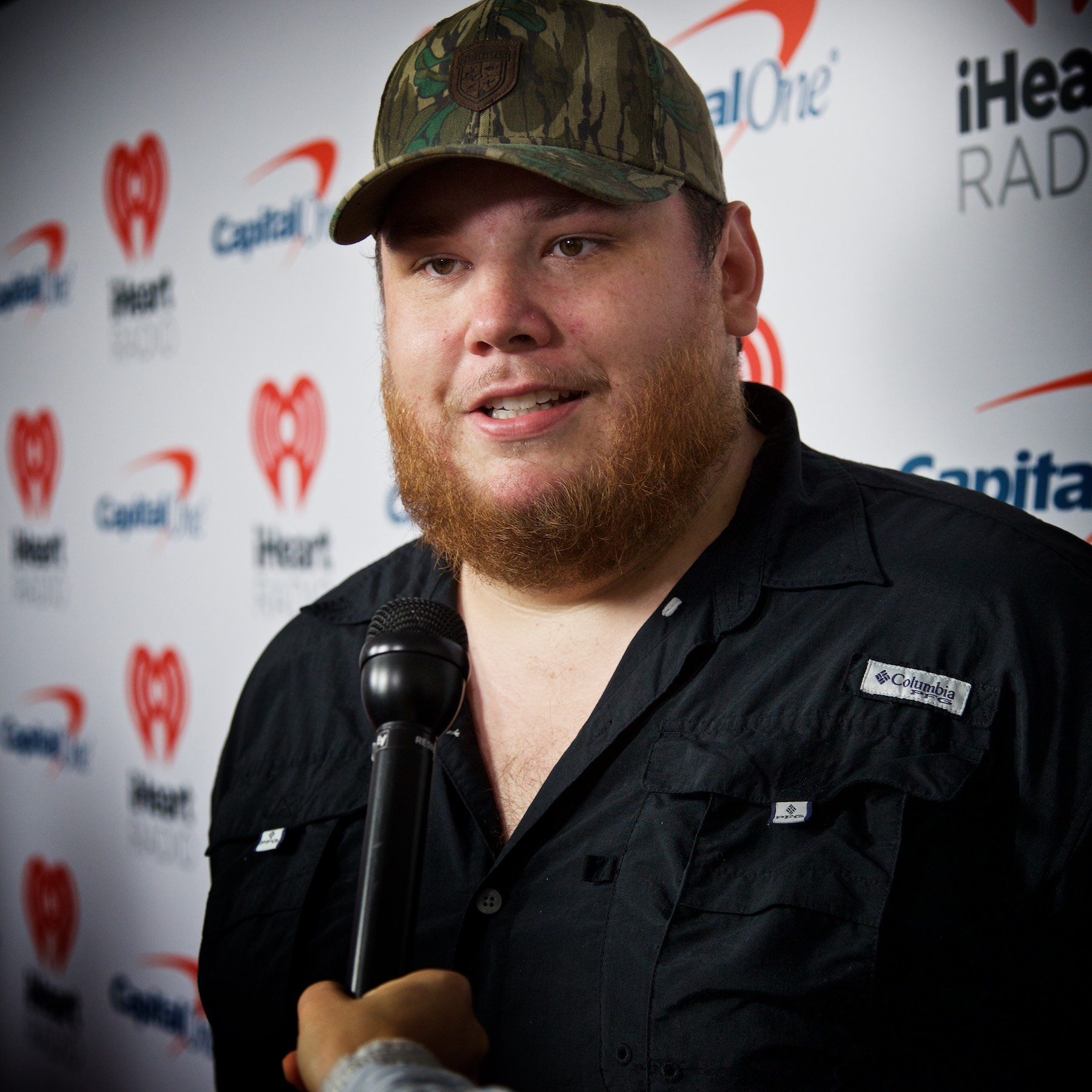
Luke Combs's 2017 album This One's for You returned to number one after the release of a deluxe edition. Its renewed success would lead to it tying the record for the most weeks at number one by an album.

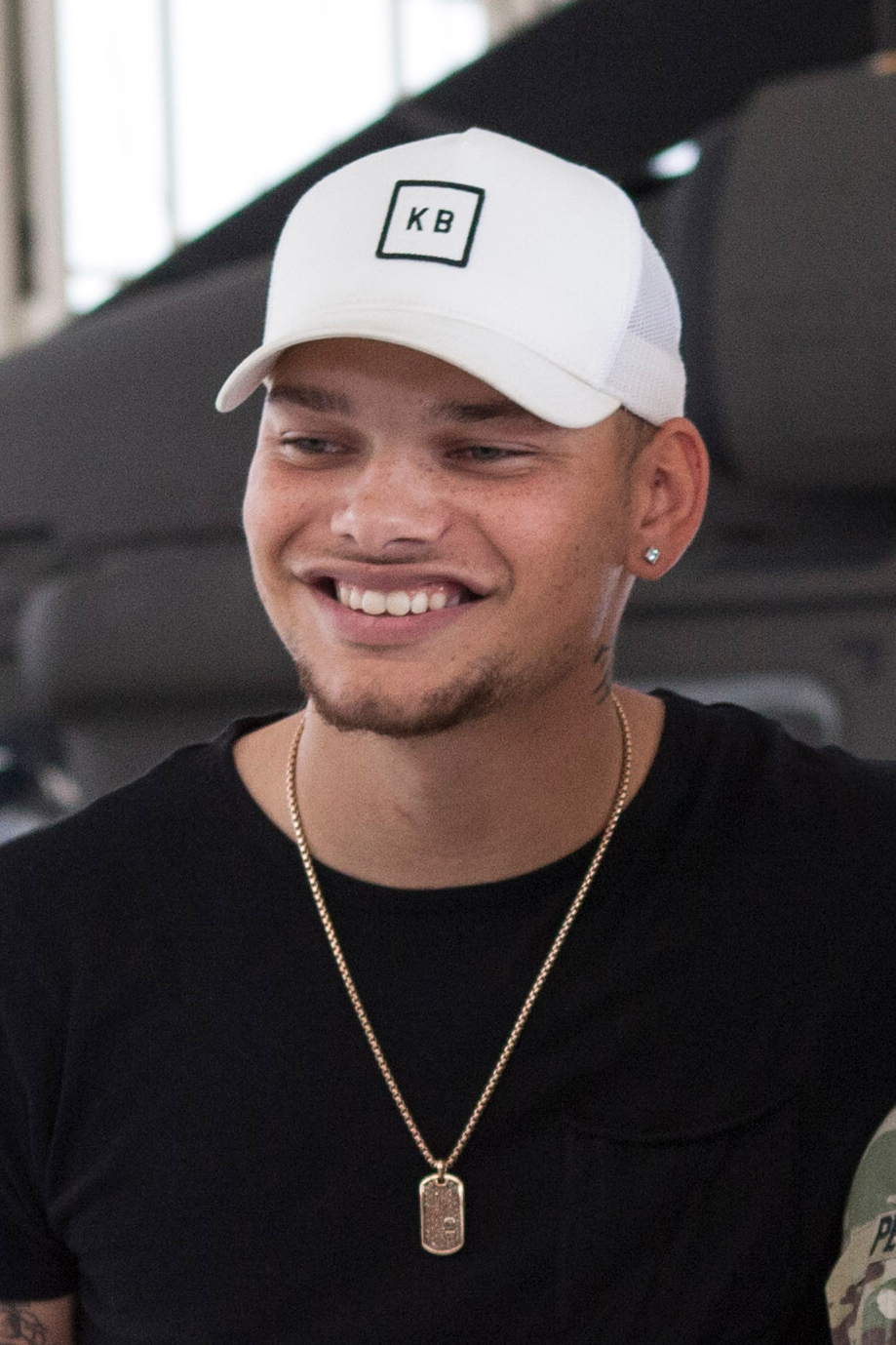
Kane Brown topped the chart with his self-titled debut album and returned to number one later in the year with Experiment.

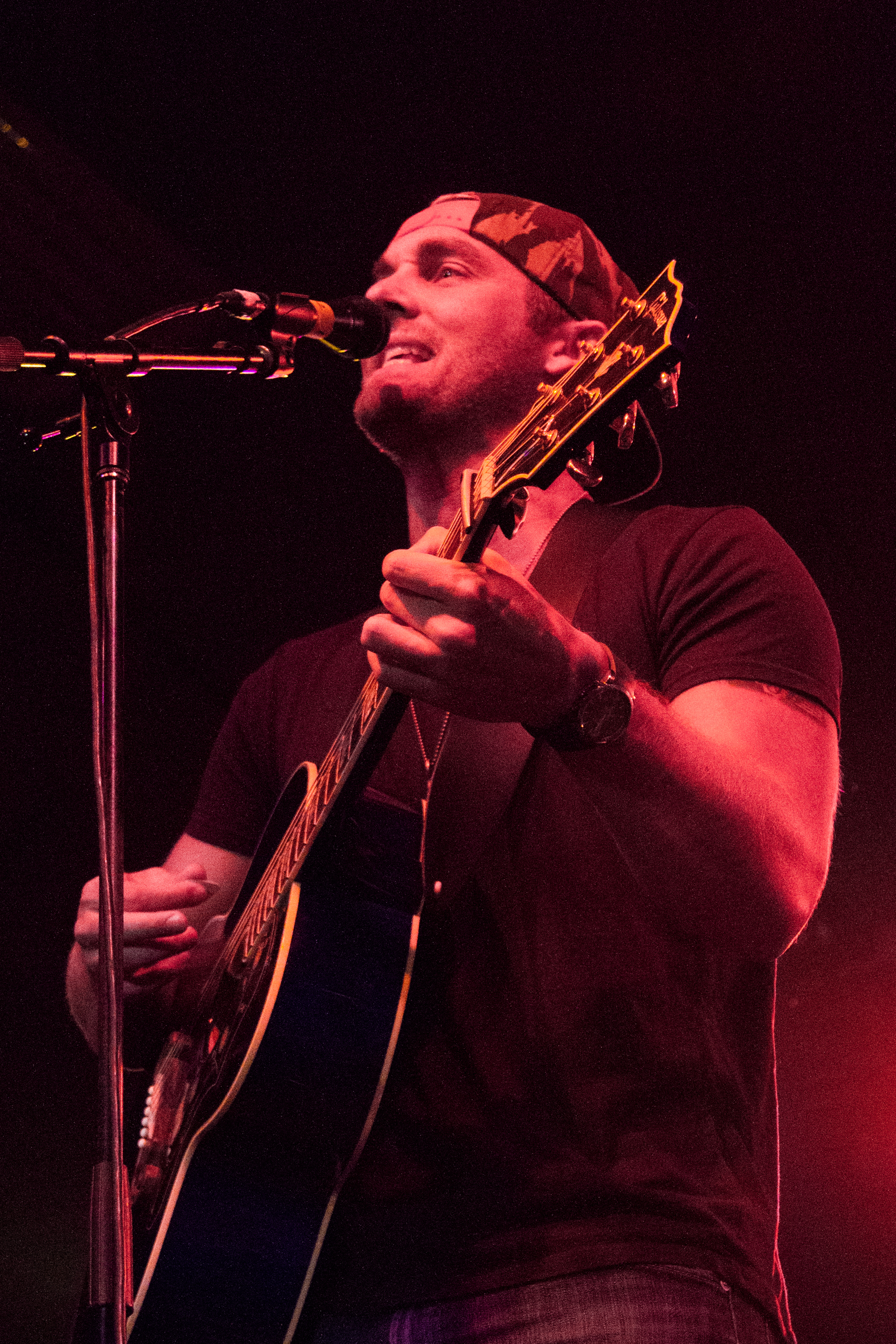
Ticket to L.A. was the first number one for Brett Young.

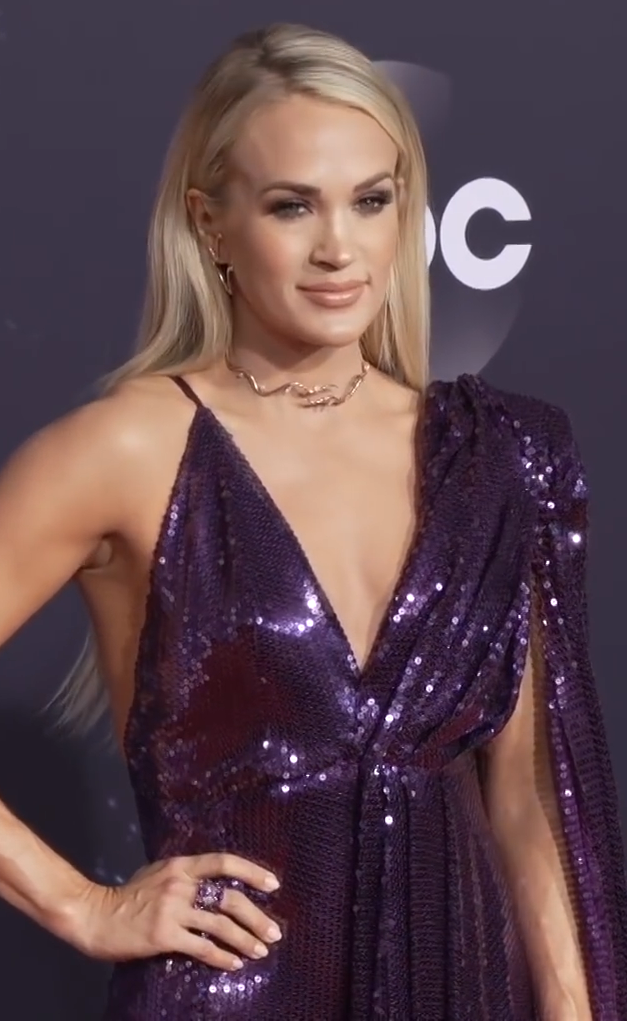
Carrie Underwood reached number one with Cry Pretty.

Issue date	Title	Artist(s)	Ref.
January 3	What Makes You Country	Luke Bryan	
January 6	The Anthology Part I: The First Five Years	Garth Brooks	
January 13	Kane Brown	Kane Brown	
January 20	Kane Brown	Kane Brown	
January 27	Kane Brown	Kane Brown	
February 3	Hallelujah Nights	Lanco	
February 10	From A Room: Volume 2	Chris Stapleton	
February 17	From A Room: Volume 2	Chris Stapleton	
February 24	From A Room: Volume 2	Chris Stapleton	
March 3	Kane Brown	Kane Brown	
March 10	Kane Brown	Kane Brown	
March 17	Kane Brown	Kane Brown	
March 24	Kane Brown	Kane Brown	
March 31	Seasons Change	Scotty McCreery	
April 7	Kane Brown	Kane Brown	
April 14	Golden Hour	Kacey Musgraves	
April 21	Kane Brown	Kane Brown	
April 28	Rearview Town	Jason Aldean	
May 5	Rearview Town	Jason Aldean	
May 12	Graffiti U	Keith Urban	
May 19	Rearview Town	Jason Aldean	
May 26	Rearview Town	Jason Aldean	
June 2	Rearview Town	Jason Aldean	
June 9	Kane Brown	Kane Brown	
June 16	This One's for You	Luke Combs	
June 23	The Mountain	Dierks Bentley	
June 30	Rearview Town	Jason Aldean	
July 7	Dan + Shay	Dan + Shay	
July 14	This One's for You	Luke Combs	
July 21	This One's for You	Luke Combs	
July 28	This One's for You	Luke Combs	
August 4	This One's for You	Luke Combs	
August 11	Songs for the Saints	Kenny Chesney	
August 18	This One's for You	Luke Combs	
August 25	This One's for You	Luke Combs	
September 1	All of It	Cole Swindell	
September 8	This One's for You	Luke Combs	
September 15	This One's for You	Luke Combs	
September 22	This One's for You	Luke Combs	
September 29	Cry Pretty	Carrie Underwood	
October 6	Cry Pretty	Carrie Underwood	
October 13	This One's for You	Luke Combs	
October 20	Desperate Man	Eric Church	
October 27	Desperate Man	Eric Church	
November 3	This One's for You	Luke Combs	
November 10	This One's for You	Luke Combs	
November 17	Interstate Gospel	Pistol Annies	
November 24	Experiment	Kane Brown	
December 1	This One's for You	Luke Combs	
December 8	This One's for You	Luke Combs	
December 15	This One's for You	Luke Combs	
December 22	Ticket to L.A.	Brett Young	
December 29	This One's for You	Luke Combs	

== See also ==
- 2018 in music
- List of number-one country singles of 2018 (U.S.)
