= God Gave Me a Girl =

Single by Russell Dickerson

from the album Russell Dickerson
- Released: December 12, 2022
- Genre: Country
- Length: 3:07
- Label: Thirty Tigers
- Songwriters: Russell Dickerson; Zach Crowell; Ashley Gorley; Chase McGill
- Producers: Russell Dickerson; Zach Crowell

Russell Dickerson singles chronology
| "She Likes It" (2022) | "God Gave Me a Girl" (2022) | "Bones" (2024) |

"God Gave Me a Girl" is a song by American country music singer Russell Dickerson. It was released on December 12, 2022, as the second single from his third studio album Russell Dickerson. He wrote the song with Ashley Gorley, Chase McGill, and Zach Crowell, with whom he also co-produced it.

== Content ==
According to Taste of Country, the song is a "sentimental track" about "the love that he almost lost", drawing inspiration from his separation from and reunion with his wife, Kailey. In August 2023, Dickerson released the song's music video, which features him re-enacting a fictionalized version of a break-up and reunion with a lover.

== Chart performance ==
=== Weekly charts ===
Weekly chart performance for "God Gave Me a Girl"
| Chart (2022–2023) | Peak position |
|---|---|
| Canada Country (Billboard) | 6 |
| US Billboard Hot 100 | 81 |
| US Country Airplay (Billboard) | 2 |
| US Hot Country Songs (Billboard) | 15 |

=== Year-end charts ===
Year-end chart performance for "God Gave Me a Girl"
| Chart (2023) | Position |
|---|---|
| US Country Airplay (Billboard) | 35 |
| US Hot Country Songs (Billboard) | 88 |
