= Where We Started =

Studio album by Thomas Rhett
- Released: April 1, 2022
- Studios: Blackbird Studio, Sound Stage Studios, Starstruck Studios and House of Drag (Nashville, Tennessee); Hound's Ear Studio (Franklin, Tennessee); MixStar Studios (Virginia Beach, Virginia)
- Genre: Country
- Length: 46:13
- Label: Valory
- Producers: Julian Bunetta; Matt Dragstrem; Jesse Frasure; Dann Huff

Thomas Rhett chronology
Country Again: Side A (2021)	Where We Started (2022)	Merry Christmas, Y'all (2022)

Singles from Where We Started
- 1. "Slow Down Summer" Released: November 5, 2021; 2. "Half of Me" Released: June 6, 2022; 3. "Angels (Don't Always Have Wings)" Released: February 6, 2023

Where We Started is the sixth studio album by American singer Thomas Rhett, released by Big Machine Records' Valory imprint on April 1, 2022. Rhett collaborated with Katy Perry, Riley Green, Tyler Hubbard and Russell Dickerson.

The album was preceded by its lead single "Slow Down Summer" which peaked at number 43 on Billboard Hot 100. Where We Startex charted within the top 20 in Canada and the United States.

== History ==
Thomas Rhett began writing songs for the album in 2019, but found out that he was experiencing writer's block. He told the blog Sounds Like Nashville that he took six months away from writing songs before coming back to continue the album's material. The album includes the lead single "Slow Down Summer", along with three collaborations: Tyler Hubbard (of Florida Georgia Line) and Russell Dickerson on "Death Row", Riley Green on "Half of Me", and Katy Perry on the title track.

== Critical reception ==
Stephen Thomas Erlewine of AllMusic rated the album 3.5 out of 5 stars, stating that it was "sunny and sweet, an ideal soundtrack for any afternoon activity from housecleaning to day drinking: it sustains its cheerful mood from stem to stern." He compared the title track to the sound of Sam Hunt, and criticized "Death Row" for its lyrics and Hubbard's vocals.

== Commercial performance ==
In the United States, Where We Started debuted at number 12 on Billboard 200 with 29,000 equivalent album units sold in its first week. The album also opened at number two on Top Country Albums, becoming his sixth top 10 on the chart.

== Track listing ==
Where We Started track listing
No.	Title	Writer(s)	Length
1.	"The Hill"	Lori McKenna; Jordan Reynolds; Emily Weisband	2:45
2.	"Church Boots"	Thomas Rhett; Jesse Frasure; Ashley Gorley; Ernest Keith Smith	2:56
3.	"Bass Pro Hat"	Rhett; Matt Dragstrem; Josh Miller; Josh Thompson	2:55
4.	"Anything Cold"	Rhett; Frasure; Gorley; Shane McAnally	2:45
5.	"Angels (Don't Always Have Wings)"	Rhett; Thompson; Julian Bunetta; Teddy Swims	3:34
6.	"Half of Me" (featuring Riley Green)	Rhett; Thompson; Rhett Akins; Will Bundy	3:02
7.	"Bring the Bar"	Rhett; Akins; Gorley; Frasure; Parker Welling	3:29
8.	"Paradise"	Rhett; Dragstrem; Smith; Thompson	3:08
9.	"Death Row" (featuring Tyler Hubbard and Russell Dickerson)	Rhett; Gorley; Zach Crowell	3:50
10.	"Mama's Front Door"	Rhett; Dragstrem; Gorley; Chase McGill	2:41
11.	"Slow Down Summer"	Rhett; Akins; Frasure; Gorley; Sean Douglas	3:36
12.	"Simple as a Song"	Rhett; Thompson; Luke Laird	3:20
13.	"Us Someday"	Rhett; Akins; Frasure; Amy Wadge	2:22
14.	"Somebody Like Me"	Rhett; Akins; Dragstrem; Thompson	2:49
15.	"Where We Started" (with Katy Perry)	Rhett; Katy Perry; Frasure; Gorley; Jon Bellion	3:01
Total length:			46:13

== Personnel ==
- Thomas Rhett – vocals, backing vocals (2–4, 7–9, 11–14), whistle (4, 8)
- Charlie Judge – acoustic piano (2, 3, 6, 7, 11, 12, 14), synthesizers (1, 8–10, 12, 13), Hammond B3 organ (2–7, 9, 10, 14, 15), Wurlitzer electric piano (4, 12), Rhodes piano (8, 14)
- Justin Niebank – programming (1–3, 6–15)
- Jesse Frasure – programming (1, 2, 6–15), electric guitar (2), synth bass (2, 7, 8, 11, 14, 15), acoustic piano (4), synthesizers (4, 15), backing vocals (4), synth strings (11, 13)
- David Huff – programming (2, 3, 5, 7–14)
- Matt Dragstrem – programming (3, 14), backing vocals (8, 14), acoustic piano (14), synthesizers (14), electric guitar (14)
- Luke Laird – programming (12), synthesizers (12), synth strings (12), synth bass (12)
- Ilya Toshinsky – acoustic guitars, gut string guitar (1), dobro (2, 3), ganjo (3), mandolin (3, 11), ukulele (4, 12), banjo (13)
- Derek Wells – electric guitar (1–4, 6, 8–15), slide electric guitar (7), electric guitar solo (14)
- Dann Huff – electric guitar (2, 4–8, 10–12), electric guitar solo (2–4, 6, 9, 10), mandolin (6, 11), synth flute (8), slide electric guitar (8, 11), sitar (8, 11, 12), programming (9, 10, 15), synth bass (10)
- Tom Bukovac – electric guitar (5)
- Julien Bunetta – acoustic guitar (5)
- Paul Franklin – steel guitar (1, 3, 5–11, 13, 15)
- Jimmie Lee Sloas – bass guitar
- Shannon Forrest – drums (1, 6)
- Chris Kimmerer – drums (2–4, 7–14), percussion (4, 12, 15)
- Jerry Roe – drums (5)
- Stuart Duncan – fiddle (3)
- Kristin Wilkinson – string arrangements (1, 11–13, 15)
- Stephen Lamb – copyist (11, 12, 15)
- Kevin Bate – cello (1, 11–13, 15)
- Austin Hoke – cello (1, 13)
- Sari Reist – cello (11, 12, 15)
- Monisa Angell – viola (1, 11–13, 15)
- Betsy Lamb – viola (1, 13)
- Chris Farrell – viola (11, 12, 15)
- David Angell – violin (1, 11–13, 15), string contractor (11, 12, 15)
- Jenny Bifano – violin (1, 13)
- David Davidson – violin (1, 11–13, 15)
- Alicia Engstrom – violin (1, 13)
- Jun Iwasaki – violin (1, 11–13, 15)
- Karen Winklemann – violin (1, 13)
- Conni Ellisor – violin (11, 12, 15)
- Josh Reedy – backing vocals (1–4, 6–14)
- Stevie Frasure – backing vocals (2, 11, 13)
- Teddy Swims – backing vocals (5)
- Riley Green – vocals (6)
- Russell Dickerson – vocals (9)
- Tyler Hubbard – vocals (9)
- Katy Perry – vocals (15)
- Jon Bellion – backing vocals (15)

=== Production ===
- Allison Jones – A&R
- Dann Huff – producer
- Jesse Frasure – producer (1, 2, 4, 6–15)
- Matt Dragstrem – producer (3), recording (3)
- Julian Bunetta – producer (5)
- Joe Baldridge – recording (1–4, 6–15)
- Buckley Miller – recording (5)
- Joel McKenney – recording assistant (1, 2, 6, 8)
- Josh Ditty – recording assistant (3, 4, 7, 9, 10, 12, 13, 15)
- Sean Badum – recording assistant (5)
- Kam Luchterhand – recording assistant (11)
- Jory Roberts – recording assistant (11, 12, 14)
- Mark Zellmer – additional recording (5)
- Steve Marcantonio – string recording (1, 11–13, 15)
- Michael Walter – string recording assistant (1, 13)
- Justin Niebank – mixing (1–14)
- Drew Bollman – mix engineer (1–4), recording (3)
- Serban Ghenea – mixing (15)
- Bryce Bordone – mix engineer (15)
- David Huff – digital editing
- Chris Small – digital editing (1, 2, 4–15)
- Scott Cooke – digital editing (3)
- Adam Ayan – mastering at Gateway Mastering (Portland, Maine)
- Mike "Frog" Griffith – production manager
- John Sherear – photography
- Sandi Spika Borchetta – art direction
- Justin Ford – art direction, design
- Thomas Rhett – art direction
- Courtney Geree – wardrobe
- Jess Berrios – grooming

== Charts ==
=== Weekly charts ===
Weekly chart performance for Where We Started
Chart (2022)	Peak position
Canadian Albums (Billboard)	20
US Billboard 200	12
US Top Country Albums (Billboard)	2

=== Year-end charts ===
2022 year-end chart performance for Where We Started
Chart (2022)	Position
US Top Country Albums (Billboard)	42
