= Hallelujah night =

Hallelujah night may refer to:

- Hallelujah Night, an alternative Christian Halloween celebration
- Hallelujah Nights, a country music album by Lanco
- Hallelujah night, a night during the Guadalcanal campaign
