= Love You Like I Used To =

Single by Russell Dickerson

from the album Southern Symphony
- Released: February 11, 2020
- Genre: Country pop
- Length: 3:06
- Label: Triple Tigers
- Songwriters: Russell Dickerson; Casey Brown; Parker Welling
- Producers: Russell Dickerson; Casey Brown; Dann Huff

Russell Dickerson singles chronology
| "Every Little Thing" (2018) | "Love You Like I Used To" (2020) | "Home Sweet" (2021) |

Music video
- "Love You Like I Used To" on YouTube

"Love You Like I Used To" is a song recorded by American country music singer Russell Dickerson from his second studio album, Southern Symphony (2020). Dickerson co-wrote the song with Casey Brown and Parker Welling, the same writers that worked on his previous three singles. Dickerson and Brown also produced the record alongside Dann Huff. It was released February 11, 2020 and serviced to American country radio March 2, 2020 as the album's lead single.

== Background ==
"Love You Like I Used To" was first written in January 2018 and then rewritten in September 2018 while Dickerson was on tour with Lady A. The writers re-worked the lyrics to create a plot twist in the first verse wherein the song presents as "a breakup song" before the chorus reveals it to be a testament to an evolving love story. Dickerson views "Love You Like I Used To" as a spiritual successor to breakthrough hit, "Yours" since it shows the growth of a relationship and better reflects his current state.

== Critical reception ==
Billy Dukes of Taste of Country wrote that the song is "a vocal showcase" that demonstrates Dickerson's ability to "[add] emotion to made-for-radio arrangements".

== Music video ==
An accompanying music video, directed by Dickerson's wife Kailey and brother-in-law Toben Seymour, premiered April 8, 2020. The clip follows a man who leaves a note for his wife before heading out on a business trip, which makes her cry upon reading it. At his new location, the man catches the attention of a female coffee shop customer, who offers him her phone number. He declines and happily returns home to his wife and children. The video ends by panning to the note, which contains the final lyrics of the song's chorus: "Didn't know I could ever love you more than I did, but baby I do. I don't love you like I used to". "Love You Like I Used To" is the first video of Dickerson's career to utilize actors in the character roles rather than featuring himself and his wife.

== Charts ==
=== Weekly charts ===
| Chart (2020) | Peak position |
|---|---|
| Canada Hot 100 (Billboard) | 60 |
| Canada Country (Billboard) | 2 |
| US Billboard Hot 100 | 31 |
| US Country Airplay (Billboard) | 1 |
| US Hot Country Songs (Billboard) | 5 |

=== Year-end charts ===
| Chart (2020) | Position |
|---|---|
| US Country Airplay (Billboard) | 45 |
| US Hot Country Songs (Billboard) | 36 |

| Chart (2021) | Position |
|---|---|
| US Country Airplay (Billboard) | 30 |
| US Hot Country Songs (Billboard) | 90 |

== Certifications ==
| Region | Certification | Certified units/sales |
|---|---|---|
| United States (RIAA) | 2× Platinum | 2,000,000^{‡} |
^{‡} Sales+streaming figures based on certification alone.
