= Born to Love You (Lanco song) =

Single by Lanco

from the album Hallelujah Nights
- Released: January 29, 2018
- Genre: Country
- Length: 3:50 (album); 3:34 (performance video); 3:21 (music video)
- Label: Arista Nashville
- Songwriters: Brandon Lancaster; Ross Copperman; Ashley Gorley; Josh Osborne
- Producer: Jay Joyce

Lanco singles chronology
"Greatest Love Story" (2017)	"Born to Love You" (2018)	"Rival" (2019)

"Born to Love You" is a song recorded by American country music band Lanco. Lead vocalist Brandon Lancaster wrote the song with Ross Copperman, Ashley Gorley, and Josh Osborne. It is the third single from the band's debut album Hallelujah Nights.

== Content ==
The song is about the small towns in which the narrator was raised, while also stating that he is "born to love" his lover. Lanco lead singer Brandon Lancaster, who co-wrote the song, told blog The Boot that " It pays homage to where we all come from. We grew up in little towns across the Southeast, and we all come from different places, but when you start talking about it, they all kind of sound like the same place... This song explores that, and talks about how, when you're from a certain place, you may feel that a certain path is set out for you, but if there's a person that you love in your life, no matter what you end up doing or where you end up going, you're kind of doing it for them anyways." He also told American Songwriter that he intended for the song to be "anthemic", and that he liked its arrangement because "It starts out a bit laid back and builds into this real rocking and up-tempo song that reflects the lyrics."

== Commercial performance ==
The song has sold 103,000 copies in the United States as of November 2018.

== Music video ==
Directed by Roman White, the song's video features the band performing in a variety of visual settings.

== Charts ==
=== Weekly charts ===
Chart (2018)	Peak position
Canada Country (Billboard)	26
US Bubbling Under Hot 100 (Billboard)	2
US Country Airplay (Billboard)	18
US Hot Country Songs (Billboard)	19

=== Year-end charts ===
Chart (2018)	Position
US Hot Country Songs (Billboard)	49

== Certifications ==
Region	Certification	Certified units/sales
Canada (Music Canada)	Platinum	80,000^{‡}
United States (RIAA)	Platinum	1,000,000^{‡}
^{‡} Sales+streaming figures based on certification alone.
