= Where We Started (song) =

Song by Thomas Rhett and Katy Perry

from the album Where We Started
- Genre: Country pop
- Length: 3:01
- Label: Valory
- Songwriters: Thomas Rhett, Jon Bellion, Ashley Gorley, Jesse Frasure
- Producers: Jesse Frasure, Dann Huff

Music video
- "Where We Started" on YouTube

"Where We Started" is a song by American singers Thomas Rhett and Katy Perry. It serves as the title track and closing song of Rhett's sixth studio album Where We Started (2022). The song was written by Rhett, Jon Bellion, Ashley Gorley, and Jesse Frasure, with production handled by Frasure and Dann Huff. Musically, it is a mid-tempo country pop ballad that blends Rhett's acoustic roots with Perry's pop style, while the lyrics reflect on a couple's journey and reminisce about the early days of their relationship as a way to find strength during difficult times.

The collaboration came to fruition after Rhett's team sent the track to Perry, who connected with the song and recorded her vocals shortly after. To promote the track, Rhett and Perry delivered their first live performance of "Where We Started" during the season 20 finale of American Idol in May 2022, and later performed it at the 56th Annual Country Music Association Awards in November 2022. An accompanying music video, directed by Patrick Tracy, was released on October 18, 2022, featuring the two artists singing in separate, colorfully draped rooms before coming together.

== Background ==
Initially, Thomas Rhett was working on Country Again: Side B, the planned follow-up to his 2021 acoustic-leaning album Country Again: Side A. However, his plans changed after a writing session at his farm with Jon Bellion, Ashley Gorley, and Jesse Frasure. During this session, they wrote "Where We Started", a song that inspired Rhett to shift creative directions toward a new project blending his country roots with more upbeat, pop-influenced tracks.

"Where We Started" was originally conceived as a solo track, and Rhett had no initial plans for it to be a collaboration. The idea for a duet came when a team member at Big Machine Label Group suggested sending the song to Katy Perry. Although Rhett agreed, he did not expect her to reply, assuming Perry received countless song pitches and had no immediate reason to record a country crossover. To his surprise, she responded within 24 hours, and mentioned connecting with its message. Over the next two weeks, Perry recorded her vocals, with Rhett later noting that her effort "really escalated the emotion of that track."

== Composition ==
Musically, "Where We Started" is a mid-tempo country pop song that blends Rhett's acoustic country sound with Perry's pop style. "Where We Started" is composed in the key of D major with a tempo of 70 beats per minute. The vocal range of Rhett and Perry spans from the low note of B_{3} to the high note of B_{5}. The lyrics encourage couples to reminisce about how far they have come to find hope and strength when facing life's difficulties with "a message that goes beyond a romantic relationship".

== Music video ==
The accompanying music video for "Where We Started" was directed by Patrick Tracy and premiered on October 18, 2022. Rhett and Perry developed a "dreamy" aesthetic for the visual to match the introspective tone of the song. In the video, the two artists are shown singing separately in rooms adorned with colorful draping. As the video progresses, they reflect on their individual journeys as artists, looking into mirrors to see reflections of their younger selves, before coming together.

Speaking on the video's concept, Perry stated that she enjoyed creating a dreamy world that allowed her to go back to her own "Nashville singer-songwriter roots." Rhett praised the singer's collaborative input in creating the visual, noting that her ideas made the experience special for him.
