= Russell Dickerson (album) =

Studio album by Russell Dickerson
- Released: November 4, 2022
- Genre: Country
- Length: 48:39
- Label: Thirty Tigers
- Producers: Russell Dickerson; Dann Huff; Zach Crowell; Casey Brown; Josh Kerr; Jake Scott; Ben Johnson; Alysa Vanderheym

Russell Dickerson chronology
Southern Symphony (2020)	Russell Dickerson (2022)	Three Months Two Streets Down (2023)

Singles from Russell Dickerson
- 1. "She Likes It" Released: April 4, 2022; 2. "God Gave Me a Girl" Released: December 12, 2022

Russell Dickerson is the third studio album by American country music singer Russell Dickerson. It was released November 4, 2022, through Thirty Tigers.

== Content ==
The album includes the lead single "She Likes It", a duet with Jake Scott, which was released on April 4, 2022. Dickerson had discovered Scott online and encouraged him to join a songwriting session, which also led to him providing vocals on the track. "God Gave Me a Girl" was released in December 2022 as the second single from the album.

Dickerson co-wrote every song on the album and co-produced with Dann Huff, Zach Crowell, Casey Brown, Josh Kerr, Ben Johnson, and Alysa Vanderheym. He told Marcus K. Dowling of The Tennessean that individual tracks were inspired by the birth of his child and seeing his wife, Kailey, sing to her. Other tracks were inspired by "quiet moments" the couple had during the COVID-19 pandemic. The couple's infant son, Remington, can be heard at the end of the track "Just Like Your Mama".

A deluxe edition of the album subtitled The Afterparty Deluxe was issued on November 3, 2023, a year after its initial release. It included new acoustic and live versions of several tracks on the original album, plus a new collaboration with Needtobreathe on "Red Dirt Church".

== Critical reception ==
A staff review on AllMusic rated the album three out of five stars, stating that "adopts a more reflective, though no less amiable tone than its predecessor".

== Track listing ==
All tracks are written by Russell Dickerson, with additional co-writers as noted.

Russell Dickerson track listing
No.	Title	Writer(s)	Length
1.	"Blame It On Being Young"	Josh Kerr; Parker Welling	3:04
2.	"Sorry"	Hunter Phelps; Ashley Gorley; Ben Johnson	3:08
3.	"She Likes It" (featuring Jake Scott)	Jake Scott; Kerr	2:43
4.	"I Still Believe"	Welling; Matt Jenkins; Zach Crowell	3:18
5.	"Big Wheels"	Gorley; Hunter Phelps; Johnson	2:09
6.	"I Remember"	Alysa Vanderheym; Chris Ryan; Logan Turner; Matt McGinn	3:05
7.	"I Wonder"	Jon Nite; Casey Brown	3:26
8.	"God Gave Me a Girl"	Gorley; Chase McGill; Crowell	3:07
9.	"All the Same Friends"	Gorley; McGill; Crowell	2:54
10.	"Beers to the Summer"	Jenkins; Mark Holman	3:17
11.	"She's Why"	Kerr; Sean Douglas	2:57
12.	"18"	Kerr; Gorley; Illsey Juber	3:13
13.	"Over and Over"	Kerr; Welling; Jordan Reynolds	2:20
14.	"Drink to This"	Crowell; Gorley; Welling	5:11
15.	"Just Like Your Mama"	Brown; Lori McKenna	4:47
Total length:			48:39

All tracks are written by Russell Dickerson, with additional co-writers as noted.

Russell Dickerson: The Afterparty Deluxe track listing
No.	Title	Writer(s)	Length
1.	"Red Dirt Church" (featuring Needtobreathe)	Kerr; Welling; William Rinehart	2:59
17.	"Beers to the Summer" (acoustic)	Jenkins; Mark Holman	3:10
18.	"God Gave Me a Girl" (acoustic)	Gorley; Chase McGill; Crowell	3:22
19.	"I Remember" (acoustic)	Vanderheym; Ryan; Turner; McGinn	2:57
20.	"Drink to This" (acoustic)	Crowell; Gorley; Welling	3:18
21.	"Over and Over" (acoustic)	Jenkins; Mark Holman	2:23
22.	"She Likes It" (live)	Scott; Kerr	3:42
23.	"Big Wheels" (live)	Gorley; Phelps; Johnson	2:34
24.	"I Wonder" (live)	Nite; Brown	3:49
25.	"I Still Believe" (live)	Jenkins; Mark Holman	3:54

== Personnel ==
- Casey Brown – background vocals (2, 4, 7, 14, 15)
- Natalie Brown – background vocals (2, 4, 7, 14, 15)
- Ben Caver – background vocals (8–10)
- Lauren Conklin – fiddle (5)
- Zach Crowell – keyboards (8–10), programming (8–10), background vocals (9)
- Russell Dickerson – lead vocals (all tracks), background vocals (11, 12)
- Kris Donegan – electric guitar (1, 8–13)
- Jeneé Fleenor – fiddle (2)
- Paul Franklin – steel guitar (6, 7, 14, 15)
- Mark Holman – keyboards (10), programming (10)
- David Huff – programming (2, 4, 6, 7, 14, 15)
- Evan Hutchings – drums (1, 11–13)
- Ben Johnson – guitars (5), keyboards (5), programming (5), background vocals (5)
- Illsey Juber – background vocals (12)
- Charlie Judge – keyboards (2, 4, 6, 7, 14, 15)
- Hannah Kerr – background vocals (13)
- Josh Kerr – acoustic guitar (1, 13), electric guitar (11, 12), guitars (3), keyboards (3), programming (1, 11–13), synthesizer (3, 11, 12), background vocals (1, 12, 13)
- Tony Lucido – bass guitar (1, 11–13)
- Devin Malone – acoustic guitar (9), electric guitar (9, 10)
- Chase McGill – electric guitar (8, 9)
- Chris McHugh – drums (8–10)
- Rob McNelley – electric guitar (4, 7, 14, 15)
- Sol Philcox-Littlefield – electric guitar (8–10)
- Josh Reedy – background vocals (2, 4, 7, 14, 15)
- Jordan Reynolds – acoustic guitar (13)
- Jerry Roe – drums (2, 6, 7, 14, 15)
- Jake Scott – bass guitar (3), keyboards (3), synthesizer (3), duet vocals (3)
- Jimmie Lee Sloas – bass guitar (2, 4, 6–10, 14, 15)
- Aaron Sterling – drums (4)
- Ilya Toshinsky – acoustic guitar (2, 4, 6–10, 14, 15), banjo (9)
- Derek Wells – electric guitar (2, 6)
- Alex Wright – piano (1, 11–13), synthesizer (1, 11–13)

== Chart performance ==
Chart performance for Russell Dickerson
Chart (2022)	Peak position
US Billboard 200	138
US Top Country Albums (Billboard)	18
US Independent Albums (Billboard)	23
