= Every Little Thing (Russell Dickerson song) =

Single by Russell Dickerson

from the album Yours
- Released: December 3, 2018
- Genre: Country pop
- Length: 3:10
- Label: Triple Tigers
- Songwriters: Russell Dickerson; Casey Brown; Spencer Saylor; Parker Welling
- Producer: Casey Brown

Russell Dickerson singles chronology
"Blue Tacoma" (2018)	"Every Little Thing" (2018)	"Love You Like I Used To" (2020)

Music video
- "Every Little Thing" on YouTube

"Every Little Thing" is a song recorded by American country music singer Russell Dickerson. It is the third single from his 2018 debut album Yours. Dickerson wrote the song with Parker Welling, Spencer Saylor and Casey Brown, the latter of whom also produced it, and was inspired by Dickerson's wife Kailey. "Every Little Thing" gave Dickerson his third consecutive number-one hit on the Billboard Country Airplay chart. It also reached numbers five and 50 on both the Hot Country Songs and Hot 100 charts respectively. It was certified Platinum by the Recording Industry Association of America (RIAA), denoting sales of over one million units in the country. The song achieved similar chart success in Canada, giving Dickerson his only number-one hit on the Country chart. An accompanying music video for the single, directed by Ben Skipworth, features footage of Dickerson and Kailey, and him touring Chicago and Grand Rapids, Michigan.

== Content ==
Dickerson's wife, Kailey, was the inspiration for the song. He told the blog Pop Culture that "I love every little thing about her, and that's what the song's about. Because when I wrote the album, we were newlyweds". Christina Foster of The Country Note indicated Dickerson's "polished and smooth voice" along with the "clapping beat" and "sweet" lyrics.

== Commercial performance ==
"Every Little Thing" debuted at number 57 on the Billboard Country Airplay chart the week of December 15, 2018. It also debuted at number 50 on the Billboard Hot Country Songs chart the week of April 6, 2019. On the Hot 100, the song debuted at number 99 the week of August 31. On the week of November 9, the single reached number one on the Country Airplay chart, making it his third consecutive number one on that chart. That same week, it peaked at number five on the Hot Country Songs chart, remaining there for 34 weeks. On the week of November 16, the song peaked at number 50 on the Hot 100, staying on the chart for 12 weeks. It was certified platinum by the RIAA on May 15, 2020.

In Canada, the track debuted at number 46 on the Canada Country chart dated May 11, 2019. It reached number one the week of November 9, staying on the chart for 30 weeks.

== Music video ==
The video was directed by Ben Skipworth, and intersperses concert footage with footage of Russell and Kailey, and shots of him touring Chinatown in Chicago and various places in Grand Rapids, Michigan including The Pyramid Scheme (pinball), the Skywalk, and 20 Monroe (concert).

== Charts ==
=== Weekly charts ===
Chart (2018–2019)	Peak position
Canada Country (Billboard)	1
US Billboard Hot 100	50
US Country Airplay (Billboard)	1
US Hot Country Songs (Billboard)	5

=== Year-end charts ===
Chart (2019)	Position
US Country Airplay (Billboard)	15
US Hot Country Songs (Billboard)	31

== Certifications ==
Region	Certification	Certified units/sales
United States (RIAA)	Platinum	1,000,000^{‡}
^{‡} Sales+streaming figures based on certification alone.
