= Greatest Love Story =

Single by Lanco

from the album Hallelujah Nights
- Released: March 6, 2017
- Genre: Country
- Length: 3:42
- Label: Arista Nashville
- Songwriter: Brandon Lancaster
- Producer: Jay Joyce

Lanco singles chronology
| "Long Live Tonight" (2016) | "Greatest Love Story" (2017) | "Born to Love You" (2018) |

"Greatest Love Story" is a song recorded by American country music group Lanco. It was released in March 2017 as the second single from their debut studio album Hallelujah Nights. Lead singer Brandon Lancaster wrote the song, and Jay Joyce was the producer. The track is about two people falling in and out of love with each other, before reuniting after realizing that they needed each other in their respective lives. "Greatest Love Story" reached number one on both the Billboard Country Airplay and Hot Country Songs charts respectively, giving the group their first (and to date, only) number-one country hit. It also charted at number 45 on the Hot 100 chart. The song achieved similar chart success in Canada, peaking at number 2 on the Canada Country chart and number 57 on the Canadian Hot 100 chart.

An accompanying music video for the song, directed by Justin Key, retells the story in the 1980s.

== Content ==
Samantha Stevens of CMT wrote that it "chronicles the story of two kids falling in love and weathering the seasons of change in their lives before coming back together again for good." Lead singer Brandon Lancaster, who wrote the song, told Taste of Country that "It’s a story of two people getting together and then separating and then realizing through that separation that what they needed in life was each other."

== Commercial performance ==
"Greatest Love Story" first entered at number 58 on Billboard's Country Airplay chart of March 18, 2017, and at number 50 on Hot Country Songs the same week. It reached number one on Country Airplay for the chart dated December 2, 2017, becoming Lanco's first (and to date, only) number-one hit. The song was certified five-times Platinum by the RIAA on January 28, 2025, and has sold 556,000 copies in the United States as of March 2018.

== Music video ==
Justin Key directed the song's music video. The video is set in the 1980s and retells the song's story, which features two lovers "going their separate ways" before reuniting.

== Charts and certifications ==
=== Weekly charts ===
| Chart (2017–2018) | Peak position |
|---|---|
| Canada Hot 100 (Billboard) | 57 |
| Canada Country (Billboard) | 2 |
| US Billboard Hot 100 | 45 |
| US Adult Pop Airplay (Billboard) | 37 |
| US Country Airplay (Billboard) | 1 |
| US Hot Country Songs (Billboard) | 1 |

=== Year-end charts ===
| Chart (2017) | Position |
|---|---|
| US Billboard Country Airplay | 48 |
| US Billboard Hot Country Songs | 24 |

| Chart (2018) | Position |
|---|---|
| US Country Airplay (Billboard) | 55 |
| US Hot Country Songs (Billboard) | 41 |

=== Decade-end charts ===
| Chart (2010–2019) | Position |
|---|---|
| US Hot Country Songs (Billboard) | 48 |

=== Certifications ===
| Region | Certification | Certified units/sales |
|---|---|---|
| Canada (Music Canada) | 2× Platinum | 160,000^{‡} |
| United States (RIAA) | 5× Platinum | 5,000,000^{‡} |
^{‡} Sales+streaming figures based on certification alone.
