= Worth Your Wild =

2025 single by Russell Dickerson

Single by Russell Dickerson

from the album Famous Back Home
- Released: October 27, 2025
- Recorded: 2024
- Genre: Country pop
- Length: 2:49
- Label: Triple Tigers
- Songwriters: Russell Dickerson; Casey Brown; Parker Welling; Michael Balzary; Seth Binzer; John Frusciante; Anthony Kiedis; Bret Mazur; Chad Smith
- Producers: Russell Dickerson; Casey Brown; Josh Kerr

Russell Dickerson singles chronology
"Happen to Me" (2025)	"Worth Your Wild" (2025)

Music video
- "Happen to Me" on YouTube

"Worth Your Wild" is a song by American country music singer Russell Dickerson. It was released on October 27, 2025, as the third single from his fourth studio album, Famous Back Home. The song was written by Dickerson, Casey Brown, and Parker Welling, and produced by Dickerson, Josh Kerr and Brown. The song features additional songwriting credits due to an interpolation of "Butterfly" by Crazy Town.

== Content ==
Dickerson introduced the idea of "Worth Your Wild" during a writing retreat with Casey Brown and Parker Welling, and the three wrote the song around the hook as a wordplay for "worth your while". They included a lyrical reference to "Butterfly" by Crazy Town, which led to securing permission through co-writing credits that included both members of Crazy Town as well as the four members of Red Hot Chili Peppers due to the original song's own interpolation of "Pretty Little Ditty". Dickerson recorded and produced the song with Josh Kerr, keeping acoustic guitar elements of the demo that Casey Brown had cut.

== Charts ==
Weekly chart performance for "Worth Your Wild"
Chart (2025–2026)	Peak position
Canada Country (Billboard)	33
US Billboard Hot 100	99
US Country Airplay (Billboard)	10
US Hot Country Songs (Billboard)	30
