= Yours (Russell Dickerson album) =

Studio album by Russell Dickerson
- Released: October 13, 2017
- Genre: Country pop
- Length: 41:40
- Label: Triple Tigers
- Producers: Casey Brown, Mike "Frog" Griffith, Jordan Reynolds

Russell Dickerson chronology
Yours (EP) (2016)	Yours (2017)	Southern Symphony (2020)

Singles from Yours
- 1. "Yours" Released: April 24, 2017; 2. "Blue Tacoma" Released: March 5, 2018; 3. "Every Little Thing" Released: December 3, 2018

Yours is the debut studio album by American country pop singer and songwriter Russell Dickerson. It was released on October 13, 2017, through Triple Tigers Records. Produced by Casey Brown, the record follows Dickerson's 2016 EP of the same name. Its lead single, the title track, has been certified 3× Platinum by the RIAA.

== Content ==
Yours includes five tracks previously released on the similarly titled extended play. An alternate "wedding version" of the title track is included as the final track on both releases. "Blue Tacoma" has received some unsolicited airplay on country radio. The song titled "MGNO" is an initialism for "my girl's night out". Dickerson co-wrote every song on the album.

== Commercial performance ==
Yours debuted at No. 5 on the Top Country Albums chart and No. 39 on the Billboard 200, selling 7,600 copies (12,000 units including streams and track sales) in the first week. The album has sold 15,600 copies in the United States as of February 2018.

== Singles ==
The title track, "Yours", serves as the lead single. It was first released independently as a digital single on July 23, 2015, and was later serviced to country radio on April 24, 2017, after Dickerson signed with Triple Tigers Records. The song has reached the top of the Country Airplay chart and the top 50 of the Hot 100.

"Blue Tacoma" was released to radio on March 5, 2018, as the album's second single.

"Every Little Thing" was released to radio on December 3, 2018, as the third single.

== Track listing ==
All tracks are written by Russell Dickerson, Casey Brown, and Parker Welling except as noted.

No.	Title	Writer(s)	Producer(s)	Length
1.	"Every Little Thing"		Brown	3:10
2.	"Yours"		Brown	3:36
3.	"Blue Tacoma"		Brown	3:32
4.	"Billions"		Brown; Mike "Frog" Griffith	3:18
5.	"All Fall Down"	Dickerson; Jordan Reynolds	Brown; Griffith; Reynolds	3:08
6.	"Float"		Brown; Griffith	3:21
7.	"MGNO"	Dickerson; Welling; Davis Naish	Brown	3:21
8.	"Would You Love Me?"	Dickerson; Reynolds; Hannah Ellis	Brown; Griffith; Reynolds	2:50
9.	"Low Key"	Dickerson; Welling; Benjamin Goldsmith	Brown; Griffith	3:36
10.	"You Look Like a Love Song"		Brown; Griffith	4:37
11.	"twentysomething"		Brown; Griffith	3:35
12.	"Yours" (Wedding edition)		Brown	3:36
Total length:				41:40

== Personnel ==
Adapted by AllMusic

- Roy Agee – trombone
- Hank Bentley – electric guitar, keyboards, mandolin
- Casey Brown – banjo, acoustic guitar, keyboards, programming, synthesizer, ukulele, background vocals, whistle
- Vinnie Ciesielski – trumpet
- Jeff Coffin – saxophone
- Bryan Dawley – acoustic guitar
- Andrew Mendelson – masterer, unknown
- Russell Dickerson – banjo, snare drum, acoustic guitar, electric guitar, lead vocals
- Kris Donegan – dobro, electric guitar
- Melinda Doolittle – background vocals
- David Dorn – keyboards
- Hannah Ellis – background vocals
- Cara Fox – cello, violin, string arrangements
- Chris Lacorte – electric guitar
- Tim Lauer – keyboards
- Stephen Leiweke – acoustic guitar, electric guitar
- Tony Lucido – bass guitar
- Rob McNelley – electric guitar, electric sitar
- Dan Needham – drums, programming
- Adam Ollendorff – pedal steel guitar
- Danny Rader – banjo, bouzouki, acoustic guitar, mandolin
- Jordan Reynolds – keyboards, programming, background vocals
- Kevin Rooney – programming
- Jimmie Lee Sloas – banjo, bass guitar, acoustic guitar
- Keith Smith – horn arrangements, trumpet
- Matt Stanfield – Hammond B-3 organ, keyboards, programming, synthesizer
- Aaron Sterling – drums, percussion
- Tyler Summers – saxophone
- Travis Toy – dobro, pedal steel guitar
- Oscar Utterström – trombone
- Parker Welling – background vocals
- Derek Wells – electric guitar
- Emoni Wilkins – background vocals

== Charts ==
=== Weekly charts ===
Chart (2017)	Peak position
US Billboard 200	39
US Top Country Albums (Billboard)	5
US Independent Albums (Billboard)	6

=== Year-end charts ===
Chart (2018)	Position
US Top Country Albums (Billboard)	55
Chart (2019)	Position
US Top Country Albums (Billboard)	45
Chart (2020)	Position
US Top Country Albums (Billboard)	78

== Certifications ==
Certifications for Yours
Region	Certification	Certified units/sales
United States (RIAA)	Gold	500,000^{‡}
^{‡} Sales+streaming figures based on certification alone.
