= Southern Symphony =

Studio album by Russell Dickerson
- Released: December 4, 2020
- Studio: Sound Stage (Nashville); Blackbird (Nashville); RTBGV (Nashville); Vibe House (Nashville)
- Genre: Country
- Length: 32:28
- Label: Triple Tigers
- Producer: Casey Brown; Russell Dickerson; Dann Huff

Russell Dickerson chronology
Yours (2017)	Southern Symphony (2020)	Russell Dickerson (2022)

Singles from Southern Symphony
- 1. "Love You Like I Used To" Released: March 2, 2020; 2. "Home Sweet" Released: January 11, 2021

Southern Symphony is the second album by American country music singer Russell Dickerson. It was released on December 4, 2020, through Triple Tigers.

== Content ==
The album's lead single is "Love You Like I Used To". In addition to this song, a lyric video for "Never Get Old" was released on Vevo in advance of the album. Florida Georgia Line are a featured artist on "It's About Time".

== Critical reception ==
Rating it 3 out of 5 stars, Stephen Thomas Erlewine of AllMusic wrote that "Frivolity doesn't weigh heavily on Dickerson's mind, but Southern Symphony has a bright, shiny gloss that suggests it's a party. The production is so slick that the deeper emotions Dickerson attempts don't quite stick, yet the album is ingratiating due to his unassuming, friendly touch and its relentless smoothness".

== Track listing ==
Southern Symphony track listing
No.	Title	Writer(s)	Length
1.	"Never Get Old"	Russell Dickerson; Parker Welling; Corey Crowder; Steven Olsen	3:07
2.	"Home Sweet"	Dickerson; Casey Brown; Charles Kelley	3:27
3.	"All Yours, All Night"	Dickerson; Brown; Jon Nite	3:08
4.	"Love You Like I Used To"	Dickerson; Brown; Welling	3:08
5.	"Forever for a Little While"	Dickerson; Brown; Welling; Kelley	3:02
6.	"It's About Time" (featuring Florida Georgia Line)	Dickerson; Brown; Welling	2:57
7.	"Honey"	Dickerson; Brown; Welling	3:20
8.	"Southern Symphony"	Dickerson; CJ Baran; Welling	3:24
9.	"Come to Jesus"	Dickerson; Crowder; Olsen	3:13
10.	"Waiting for You"	Dickerson; Dave Barnes; Jordan Reynolds	3:42
Total length:			32:28

== Personnel ==
Credits are adapted from the album's liner notes.

=== Musicians ===
- Jerry Roe – drums
- Jimmie Lee Sloas – bass
- Dann Huff – acoustic guitar, Dobro, electric guitar, mandolin
- Ilya Toshinskiy – bouzouki, acoustic guitar, mandolin, resonator guitar, ganjo, banjo
- Rob McNelley – electric guitar
- David Cohen – keyboards
- Russell Dickerson – bouzouki, electric guitar
- Travis Toy – steel guitar
- Russell Terrell – background vocals
- Natalie Brown – background vocals
- Aaron Sterling – drums
- Tony Lucido – bass
- Charlie Judge – keyboards, B-3 organ, Wurlitzer, synthesizer
- Danny Rader – acoustic guitar, bouzouki, ganjo, banjo
- Casey Brown – background vocals, electric guitar, keyboards, bouzouki
- Chris McHugh – drums
- Mark Trussell – electric guitar
- Corey Crowder – keyboards, electric guitar
- Paul Franklin – steel guitar
- Stuart Duncan – fiddle
- Mark Douthit – saxophone
- Jordan Reynolds – keyboards, electric guitar, background vocals
- Tyler Hubbard – vocals on "It's About Time"
- Brian Kelley – vocals on "It's About Time"

=== Technical and visuals ===
- Russell Dickerson – production
- Dann Huff – production, programming, digital editing
- Casey Brown – production, programming
- Buckley Miller – recording
- Justin Niebank – recording
- Justin Francis – recording assistance
- Sean Badum – recording assistance
- Seth Morton – recording assistance
- Russell Terrell – additional recording
- Corey Crowder – additional recording, additional programming, vocal production on "It's About Time"
- Sean Moffitt – mixing
- Jesse Brock – mixing assistance
- Chris Small – digital editing
- David Huff – digital editing, programming
- Jordan Reynolds – additional digital editing, additional programming
- Mike "Frog" Griffith – production coordination
- Joe LaPorta – mastering
- Luum Studio – design, artwork
- Spencer Combs – photography
- Lee Moore – wardrobe
- Marissa Machado – grooming

== Chart performance ==
Chart (2020–2021)	Peak position
US Billboard 200	134
US Top Country Albums (Billboard)	14
US Independent Albums (Billboard)	18
