= Half of Me (Thomas Rhett and Riley Green song) =

2022 song by Thomas Rhett and Riley Green

Single by Thomas Rhett and Riley Green

from the album Where We Started
- Released: June 6, 2022
- Genre: Country
- Length: 3:03
- Label: Valory
- Songwriters: Thomas Rhett; Josh Thompson; Rhett Akins; RC Atwell; Will Bundy
- Producers: Jesse Frasure; Dann Huff

Thomas Rhett singles chronology
"Slow Down Summer" (2021)	"Half of Me" (2022)	"Angels (Don't Always Have Wings)" (2023)

Riley Green singles chronology
"Hell of a Way to Go" (2022)	"Half of Me" (2022)	"Different 'Round Here" (2023)

Lyric video
- "Half of Me" on YouTube

"Half of Me" is a song by American country music singers Thomas Rhett and Riley Green. It was released on June 6, 2022, as the second single from Rhett's sixth studio album Where We Started.

== Content ==
Rhett wrote the song while on tour. He co-wrote it with his father Rhett Akins, as well as Will Bundy and Josh Thompson. According to CMT, Thompson came up with the song's hook "half of me wants a cold beer / And the other half does too" while in a conversation with Rhett. They wrote the song in about half an hour. After it was completed, Rhett suggested adding Riley Green as a duet partner, because the two had become friends after hunting together.

The song is about a man who wants to consume alcohol instead of tending to his everyday chores. Carena Liptak of Taste of Country compared the song's sound to the country music of the 1990s.

== Charts ==
=== Weekly charts ===
Weekly chart performance for "Half of Me"
Chart (2022)	Peak position
Canada Hot 100 (Billboard)	54
Canada Country (Billboard)	1
US Billboard Hot 100	52
US Country Airplay (Billboard)	1
US Hot Country Songs (Billboard)	9

=== Year-end charts ===
2022 year-end chart performance for "Half of Me"
Chart (2022)	Position
US Country Airplay (Billboard)	42
US Hot Country Songs (Billboard)	62

2023 year-end chart performance for "Half of Me"
Chart (2023)	Position
US Country Airplay (Billboard)	59
US Hot Country Songs (Billboard)	63

== Certifications ==
Certifications for "Half of Me"
Region	Certification	Certified units/sales
Canada (Music Canada)	2× Platinum	160,000^{‡}
United States (RIAA)	Platinum	1,000,000^{‡}
^{‡} Sales+streaming figures based on certification alone.
