= Famous Back Home =

Studio album by Russell Dickerson
- Released: August 22, 2025
- Genre: Country
- Length: 38:31
- Label: Triple Tigers
- Producers: Russell Dickerson; Josh Kerr; Casey Brown; Chris LaCorte

Russell Dickerson chronology
Bones (2024)	Famous Back Home (2025)

Singles from Famous Back Home
- 1. "Bones" Released: July 15, 2024; 2. "Happen to Me" Released: March 10, 2025; 3. "Worth Your Wild" Released: October 27, 2025

Famous Back Home is the fourth studio album by American country music singer Russell Dickerson. It was released on August 22, 2025, through Triple Tigers.

== Background ==
Dickerson co-wrote all but two of the 12 songs on Famous Back Home, making it the first time the singer has used outside cuts on one of his albums. He co-produced the record with longtime collaborator Josh Kerr, with additional production from Casey Brown and Chris LaCorte on select songs.

Famous Back Home was announced on June 5, 2025, alongside its cover artwork, on Dickerson's social media accounts. On the inspiration for the album's title, he said: "Growing up in a small town, I had this idea 'I'm going to make it out of here. I'm going to make it big. Everybody is going to know my name,' But then you have a family, and it's like, 'Actually, all I want to do is be famous at home. The further down this road I get, the more I realize the only thing that matters is my family".

== Singles ==
"Bones" was released as the album's lead single on July 15, 2024, and was previously included as the title track on a five-track EP released on August 30, 2024. The song debuted (and peaked) at number 36 on the Billboard Country Airplay chart.

"Happen to Me" was released on March 10, 2025, as the album's second single. It was added to 66 country radio stations upon impact and was the highest streaming debut of Dickerson's career.

"Worth Your Wild" impacted country radio on October 27, 2025, as the album's third single.

The album was also preceded by the release of three promotional singles: "Heard It in a Country Song", "Sippin' on Top of the World", and "Worth Your Wild".

== Promotion ==
Dickerson supported the album with the RussellMania Tour, which initially began on March 14, 2025, in Nashville, with the singer later adding a second and third leg of the tour that extended it through November 2025. With the tour name inspired by Dickerson's love of wrestling, he played a "special hype-up video" recorded by Hulk Hogan for the crowd at his shows. He posted a remembrance on his social media accounts following Hogan's death in July 2025.

== Track listing ==
Famous Back Home track listing
No.	Title	Writer(s)	Length
1.	"Dust"	Russell Dickerson; John Byron; Josh Kerr	3:04
2.	"Sippin' on Top of the World"	Casey Brown; Hunter Phelps; Travis Wood	3:09
3.	"Happen to Me"	Dickerson; Jessie Jo Dillon; Chris LaCorte; Chase McGill; Robert Hazard (Note: Contains an interpolation of "Girls Just Want to Have Fun" by Robert Hazard.)	3:03
4.	"Worth Your Wild"	Dickerson; Brown; Parker Welling; Michael Balzary; Seth Binzer; John Frusciante; Anthony Kiedis; Bret Mazur; Chad Smith (Note: Contains an interpolation of "Butterfly" by Crazy Town.)	2:49
5.	"Heard It in a Country Song"	Dickerson; LaCorte; McGill; Welling	3:48
6.	"Sunrise in My Silverado"	Dickerson; Brown; McGill; Phelps	3:32
7.	"For a Truck"	Dickerson; Brown; Blake Pendergrass	3:14
8.	"Love That I Love You"	Dickerson; Brown; Ashley Gorley; LaCorte	2:43
9.	"Never Leave"	Greylan James; Josh Miller; Matt Roy	3:17
10.	"Bones"	Dickerson; LaCorte; McGill; Welling	2:53
11.	"16 Me"	Dickerson; Andy Albert; LaCorte; Cole Taylor	3:12
12.	"Famous Back Home"	Dickerson; Brown; Welling	3:42
Total length:			38:31

== Charts ==
Chart performance for Famous Back Home
Chart (2025)	Peak position
Australian Country Albums (ARIA)	40
US Billboard 200	186
US Independent Albums (Billboard)	31
US Top Country Albums (Billboard)	34
