= Happen to Me =

2025 single by Russell Dickerson

Single by Russell Dickerson

from the album Famous Back Home
- Released: March 10, 2025
- Recorded: 2024
- Genre: Country pop
- Length: 3:03
- Label: Triple Tigers
- Songwriters: Chris LaCorte; Jessie Jo Dillon; Chase McGill; Robert Hazard; Russell Dickerson
- Producers: Russell Dickerson; Josh Kerr; Chris LaCorte

Russell Dickerson singles chronology
"Bones" (2024)	"Happen to Me" (2025)	"Worth Your Wild" (2025)

Jonas Brothers singles chronology
"I Can't Lose" (2025)	"Happen to Me" (2025)	"Coming Home This Christmas" (2025)

Music video
- "Happen to Me" on YouTube

"Happen to Me" is a song by American country music singer Russell Dickerson. It was released on March 10, 2025, as the second single from his fourth studio album, Famous Back Home. The song was written by Dickerson, Chris LaCorte, Jessie Jo Dillon, and Chase McGill and produced by Dickerson, Josh Kerr, and LaCorte.

== Background and promotion ==
Dickerson recorded the song in 2024, at the same time that he recorded his song "Bones". It references "Girls Just Want to Have Fun" by Cyndi Lauper, and although not an interpolation, credits the song's composer Robert Hazard as a songwriter. "Happen to Me" gained significant popularity after a dance to the song went viral on the video-sharing platform TikTok. It was sent to country radio on March 10, 2025, being added to 66 stations.

== Composition ==
"Happen to Me" is a country pop song. The lyrics follow a man meeting a woman who has recently broken up at the bar and spending a night out with her, involving dancing, singing, conversing and drinking. He falls in love with the woman without her knowing and is determined to cherish every moment, even if they may not see each other again.

== Music videos ==
The music video for "Happen to Me" premiered on July 16, 2025, and was directed by Daniella Mason.

On July 31, 2026, Dickerson made a cameo appearance in the Kidz Bop music video of their version of "Happen to Me", becoming the first country artist to appear in a music video with the KIDZ BOP kids.

== Live performance ==
During the Jonas20: Greetings from Your Hometown Tour concert in Detroit on August 28, 2025, the Jonas Brothers invited Russell Dickerson to perform "Happen to Me" live on-stage with them, which later led to the recording of a new studio version of the song featuring the Jonas Brothers.

== Charts ==
=== Weekly charts ===
Weekly chart performance for "Happen to Me"
Chart (2025–2026)	Peak position
Australia Country Hot 50 (The Music)	23
Canada Hot 100 (Billboard)	40
Canada Country (Billboard)	1
UK Country Airplay (Radiomonitor)	1
US Billboard Hot 100	28
US Adult Contemporary (Billboard)	20
US Adult Pop Airplay (Billboard)	11
US Country Airplay (Billboard)	1
US Hot Country Songs (Billboard)	6
US Pop Airplay (Billboard)	23

=== Year-end charts ===
Year-end chart performance for "Happen to Me"
Chart (2025)	Position
Canada (Canadian Hot 100)	73
Canada Country (Billboard)	19
US Billboard Hot 100	69
US Country Airplay (Billboard)	9
US Hot Country Songs (Billboard)	16

== Release history ==
Region	Date	Format	Label
United States	February 21, 2025	Digital download	Triple Tigers
United States	March 10, 2025	Country radio	Triple Tigers

== Certifications ==
Certifications for "Happen To Me"
Region	Certification	Certified units/sales
United States (RIAA)	3× Platinum	3,000,000^{‡}
^{‡} Sales+streaming figures based on certification alone.
