= Angels (Don't Always Have Wings) =

Single by Thomas Rhett

from the album Where We Started
- Released: January 23, 2023
- Genre: Country
- Length: 3:34 (album version); 3:20 (single version)
- Label: Big Machine
- Songwriters: Thomas Rhett; Josh Thompson; Teddy Swims; Julian Bunetta
- Producers: Dann Huff; Jesse Frasure; Julian Bunetta

Thomas Rhett singles chronology
"Half of Me" (2022)	"Angels (Don't Always Have Wings)" (2023)	"Talking to Jesus" (2023)

"Angels (Don't Always Have Wings)", originally known as just "Angels", is a song by American country music singer Thomas Rhett. It was released on January 23, 2023 as the third single from his sixth studio album Where We Started.

== History ==
"Angels (Don't Always Have Wings)" was a co-write among Thomas Rhett, Josh Thompson, Julian Bunetta, and Teddy Swims. Rhett decided on writing a song about angels after reading a book on them, and came up with the title phrase "angels don't always have wings", which he thought could describe his wife. He presented the idea to Thompson, Swims, and Bunetta at a songwriting session. The four came up with a waltz melody to which they set the song's central idea. Lyrically, the song is about a "mess of a man" who describes his wife as an angel. Originally, Rhett had intended for Swims to sing the song, but after hearing the demo with Swims' vocals, decided to keep it for himself.

Dann Huff produced the song's final recording. Rhett recorded the vocals at his home studio, compiling the final vocal track from nearly 70 takes due to him having difficulty singing falsetto and wanting to show "emotion". Bunetta then remixed Huff's production by changing the bass and drum lines while adding studio effects to the piano.

== Charts ==
=== Weekly charts ===
Weekly chart performance
Chart (2023)	Peak position
Canada Hot 100 (Billboard)	83
Canada Country (Billboard)	4
US Billboard Hot 100	69
US Country Airplay (Billboard)	1
US Hot Country Songs (Billboard)	17

=== Year-end charts ===
Year-end chart performance
Chart (2023)	Position
US Country Airplay (Billboard)	17
US Hot Country Songs (Billboard)	49
US Radio Songs (Billboard)	74

== Certifications ==
Certifications and sales
Region	Certification	Certified units/sales
Canada (Music Canada)	Gold	40,000^{‡}
United States (RIAA)	Gold	500,000^{‡}
^{‡} Sales+streaming figures based on certification alone.
