= Slow Down Summer =

2021 single by Thomas Rhett

Single by Thomas Rhett

from the album Where We Started
- Released: November 5, 2021
- Genre: Country
- Length: 3:36
- Label: Valory
- Songwriters: Ashley Gorley; Sean Douglas; Jesse Frasure; Rhett Akins; Thomas Rhett
- Producers: Dann Huff; Jesse Frasure

Thomas Rhett singles chronology
| "Thank You Lord" (2021) | "Slow Down Summer" (2021) | "Half of Me" (2022) |

Music video
- "Slow Down Summer" on YouTube

"Slow Down Summer" is a song by American country music singer Thomas Rhett. It was released on November 5, 2021 as the lead single from his sixth studio album, Where We Started. The song was written by Rhett with his father Rhett Akins, as well as Ashley Gorley, Sean Douglas, and Jesse Frasure.

== Background ==
In a press release, Rhett stated: "I wrote this song from the point of view of two people who are in love during senior year of high school, I envisioned them headed off to different schools and they're starting to understand that the moment the weather starts to change, they've got a 99-percent chance this relationship is not going to work. I know that myself and a lot of people have been there before, wishing the fireworks stage doesn't have to end."

== Content ==
Carena Liptak of ABC Audio wrote that the lyrics "follow a couple who are soaking up every minute of their summer love together, knowing that when the weather cools, so will their relationship." Chris Parton of Sounds Like Nashville described the storyline as "two lovers locked in a summer they'll never forget—but knowing all too well their time together will soon end".

== Composition ==
The song includes instrumentation from a 14-piece string section as well as a piano melody. It is written in the key of B major, with a tempo of 156 beats per minute.

== Critical reception ==
Billy Dukes of Taste of Country opined that the track is "a nostalgic summer love song that stings just like it should".

== Music video ==
The music video was released on December 3, 2021, and directed by P. Tracy. It described a story of "two young people holding on to the last moments of a summer together, as they prepare to embark on a new season apart". It features as Rhett plays the piano in different seasons.

== Charts ==
=== Weekly charts ===
Weekly chart performance for "Slow Down Summer"
| Chart (2021–2022) | Peak position |
|---|---|
| Canada Hot 100 (Billboard) | 64 |
| Canada Country (Billboard) | 4 |
| US Billboard Hot 100 | 43 |
| US Country Airplay (Billboard) | 2 |
| US Hot Country Songs (Billboard) | 9 |

=== Year-end charts ===
2022 year-end chart performance for "Slow Down Summer"
| Chart (2022) | Position |
|---|---|
| US Country Airplay (Billboard) | 32 |
| US Hot Country Songs (Billboard) | 32 |

== Certifications ==
| Region | Certification | Certified units/sales |
|---|---|---|
| United States (RIAA) | Platinum | 1,000,000^{‡} |
^{‡} Sales+streaming figures based on certification alone.

== Release history ==
Release history for "Slow Down Summer"
| Region | Date | Format | Label | Ref. |
|---|---|---|---|---|
| Various | November 5, 2021 | Digital download; streaming | Valory | |
| United States | November 8, 2021 | Country radio | Valory | |
