= Lanco (band) =

American country music band

- Origin: Nashville, Tennessee, U.S.
- Genre: Country
- Years active: 2013–present
- Labels: Arista Nashville, Riser House
- Members: Brandon Lancaster; Chandler Baldwin; Jared Hampton; Tripp Howell; Tim Aven
- Past members: Eric Steedly

Lanco (sometimes stylized in all caps) is an American country music band from Nashville. The band consists of Brandon Lancaster (lead vocals), Chandler Baldwin (bass guitar), Jared Hampton (keyboards, banjo), Tim Aven (guitar), and Tripp Howell (drums). The band is signed to Riser House Records. The band's name is short for Lancaster and Company.

== Music career ==
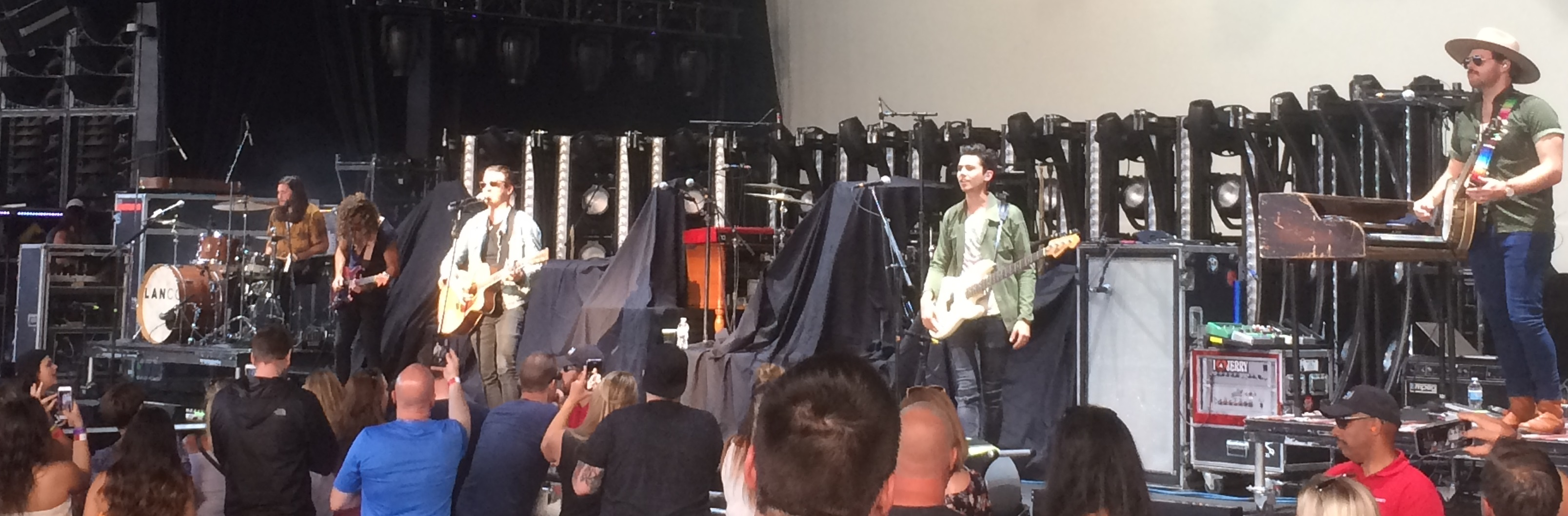
Lanco performing at the DTE Energy Music Theatre in Independence Township, Michigan, June 2018

The band was founded in 2015. After meeting record producer Jay Joyce at a Keith Urban concert, they signed to his publishing company and then to Arista Nashville. Through the label, they released their debut four-song EP, titled Extended Play on April 15, 2016. They also released their first single from the album, "Long Live Tonight", and another song of theirs, "Greatest Love Story", appears in the Netflix series The Ranch as well as season 22 of ABC's The Bachelor. "Greatest Love Story" reached No. 1 on the Hot Country Songs and Country Airplay charts at the end of 2017.

In December 2017, Sony Nashville announced the band's third single, "Born to Love You". It and "Greatest Love Story" appear on their debut album Hallelujah Nights, which was released in January 2018. The album debuted at No. 1 on Billboard's Top Country Albums, with 13,000 copies (19,000 album equivalent units total) sold in the first week.

After a string of non-album singles, the band self-released an EP, titled Honky-Tonk Hippies, on July 2, 2021. They followed the EP and 30 date tour with their single “Low Class Lovers” in April 2022. LANCO has toured with Miranda Lambert, Luke Combs, Dierks Bentley, and Kane Brown. In 2023, the band signed with Riser House Records. They released their debut EP with the label, titled Run, Run, Baby, on October 5 and headlined an accompanying Fall tour.

== Personal life ==
Lancaster and Tiffany, his wife, married in September 2017; they have two children, Elora and Ezra. Baldwin wed his wife Natalie on Christmas Eve 2016 and welcomed a daughter in 2021. Hampton married his wife Autumn in November 2017. Howell is married to his high school sweetheart and they had a son in 2021.

== Discography ==
=== Albums ===
Title	Album details	Peak chart positions		Sales	Certifications
Title	Album details	US	US Country	Sales	Certifications
Hallelujah Nights	Release date: January 19, 2018; Label: Arista Nashville; Formats: CD, digital download	20	1	US: 47,900	RIAA: Gold
We're Gonna Make It	Release date: January 17, 2025; Label: Riser House; Formats: CD, digital download	—	—		

=== Extended plays ===
Title	Extended play details	Peak chart positions		Sales
Title	Extended play details	US	US Country	Sales
Extended Play	Release date: April 15, 2016; Label: Arista Nashville; Formats: CD, digital download	200	25	US: 10,500
Lessons Learned	Release date: October 11, 2019; Label: Arista Nashville; Formats: Digital download	—	—	
Honky-Tonk Hippies	Release date: July 2, 2021; Label: LANCO; Formats: Digital download	—	—	
Run, Run, Baby	Release date: October 5, 2023; Label: Riser House Records; Formats: CD, vinyl, digital download	—	—	

=== Singles ===
Single	Year	Peak chart positions					Certifications	Album
Single	Year	US	US Country	US Country Airplay	CAN	CAN Country	Certifications	Album
"Long Live Tonight"	2016	—	46	32	—	—		Hallelujah Nights
"Greatest Love Story"	2017	45	1	1	57	2	RIAA: 5× Platinum; MC: 2× Platinum	Hallelujah Nights
"Born to Love You"	2018	— (Note: "Born to Love You" did not enter the Billboard Hot 100, but peaked at number two on the Bubbling Under Hot 100 Singles chart.)	19	18	—	26	RIAA: Platinum; MC: Platinum	Hallelujah Nights
"Rival"	2019	—	—	56	—	—		—N/a
"What I See"	2019	—	—	39	—	—		—N/a
"Save Me"	2020	—	—	—	—	—		—N/a
"Near Mrs"	2021	—	—	—	—	—		—N/a
"First Beer"	2021	—	—	—	—	—		—N/a
"Low Class Lovers"	2022	—	—	—	—	—		—N/a
"Sound of a Saturday Night"	2023	—	—	—	—	—		We're Gonna Make It
"Lasso"	2023	—	—	—	—	—		We're Gonna Make It
"Honey, I Lost My Job Today"	2023	—	—	—	—	—		We're Gonna Make It
"Wild Again"	2024	—	—	—	—	—		We're Gonna Make It
"We Grew Up Together" (featuring Cory Asbury)	2025	—	—	—	—	—		We're Gonna Make It
"—" denotes releases that did not chart

=== Music videos ===
Year	Video	Director
2016	"Long Live Tonight"	Peter Zavadil
2017	"Greatest Love Story"	Justin Key
2018	"Born to Love You"	Roman White
2019	"Rival"	Peter Zavadil
2020	"What I See"	David Abbott
2022	"Low Class Lovers"	Brandon Lancaster, Devon Lancaster

== Awards and nominations ==
Year	Ceremony	Nominated work	Category	Result	Ref.
2018	Academy of Country Music Awards	LANCO	New Duo or Group of the Year	Nominated	
2018	American Music Awards	LANCO	Favorite Duo or Group - Country	Nominated	
2018	Country Music Association Awards	LANCO	Vocal Group of the Year	Nominated	
2019	Academy of Country Music Awards	LANCO	New Duo or Group of the Year	Won	
2019	Academy of Country Music Awards	LANCO	Group of the Year	Nominated	
2019	CMT Music Awards	LANCO -"Born to Love You"	Group Video of the Year	Nominated	
2019	iHeartRadio Music Awards	LANCO	Best Country Artist	Nominated	
