= Blue Tacoma =

Single by Russell Dickerson

from the album Yours
- Released: March 5, 2018
- Genre: Country pop
- Length: 3:32
- Label: Triple Tigers
- Songwriters: Russell Dickerson; Casey Brown; Parker Welling
- Producer: Casey Brown

Russell Dickerson singles chronology
"Yours" (2017)	"Blue Tacoma" (2018)	"Every Little Thing" (2018)

Music video
- "Blue Tacoma" on YouTube

"Blue Tacoma" is a song co-written and recorded by American country music singer Russell Dickerson. It is the second single from his 2017 debut album Yours and the follow-up to his debut single, also titled "Yours". Dickerson wrote the song with Parker Welling and Casey Brown, the latter of whom also produced it.

== Content ==
Carena Liptak of The Boot said that the song is about "a vivid picture of falling in love to the backdrop of gorgeous California scenery, all in a Toyota Tacoma". Dickerson said that the song was originally about taking a road trip, but after presenting his cowriters with the idea, they chose to add details that Dickerson had witnessed while driving down the Pacific Coast Highway with his wife, Kailey.

== Music video ==
Russell's wife Kailey Dickerson and her brother, Toben Seymour, directed the song's music video, which features footage of her and her husband driving along the highway.

== Commercial performance ==
The song has sold 87,000 copies in the United States as of November 2018.

== Charts ==
=== Weekly charts ===
Chart (2018)	Peak position
Canada Hot 100 (Billboard)	83
Canada Country (Billboard)	2
US Billboard Hot 100	52
US Country Airplay (Billboard)	1
US Hot Country Songs (Billboard)	5

=== Year-end charts ===
Chart (2018)	Position
US Country Airplay (Billboard)	9
US Hot Country Songs (Billboard)	30

== Certifications ==
Region	Certification	Certified units/sales
United States (RIAA)	3× Platinum	3,000,000^{‡}
^{‡} Sales+streaming figures based on certification alone.
