= Home Sweet =

Single by Russell Dickerson

from the album Southern Symphony
- Released: January 11, 2021
- Genre: Country pop
- Length: 3:25
- Label: Triple Tigers
- Songwriters: Casey Brown; Charles Kelley; Russell Dickerson
- Producers: Russell Dickerson; Casey Brown; Dann Huff

Russell Dickerson singles chronology
"Love You Like I Used To" (2020)	"Home Sweet" (2021)	"She Likes It" (2022)

"Home Sweet" is a song recorded by American country music singer Russell Dickerson. It was released on January 11, 2021 as a second single from his second studio album Southern Symphony. The song was co-written by Lady A's Charles Kelley, Casey Brown and Dickerson, who also produced by Dann Huff. A remix featuring Lady A themselves was released on November 19, 2021. The song peaked at number 11 on the Billboard Country Airplay chart, becoming Dickerson's first major-label single to miss number one.

== Background ==
"Home Sweet" is inspired by Dickerson's wife, Kailey. They announced that they are expecting their first child in April 2021. In an interview, he said: "This song is as real as it gets. The week Kailey and I got home from our honeymoon my income stopped. I was in between deals and we were flat broke", Dickerson explained about the new track. "Now we just moved into our new house and have a baby on the way so yeah, 'Home Sweet' is about as spot on real life as it gets".

== Music video ==
The music video was released on February 3, 2021, which is the eight-year anniversary of the day Dickerson proposed to his now-wife Kailey. It shows Dickerson serenading Kailey with an acoustic song professing his love before getting down on one knee with a ring in hand, Kailey tearfully replying "yes" to the life-changing proposal, and goes on to characteristic clips from home-videos and self-shot footage from during the last eight years and their present-day marriage.

== Charts ==
=== Weekly charts ===
Weekly chart performance for "Home Sweet"
Chart (2021–2022)	Peak position
Canada Country (Billboard)	22
US Billboard Hot 100	88
US Country Airplay (Billboard)	11
US Hot Country Songs (Billboard)	21

=== Year-end charts ===
2021 year-end chart performance for "Home Sweet"
Chart (2021)	Position
US Hot Country Songs (Billboard)	81

2022 year-end chart performance for "Home Sweet"
Chart (2022)	Position
US Country Airplay (Billboard)	48
US Hot Country Songs (Billboard)	71
