= Russell Dickerson =

American singer-songwriter (born 1987)

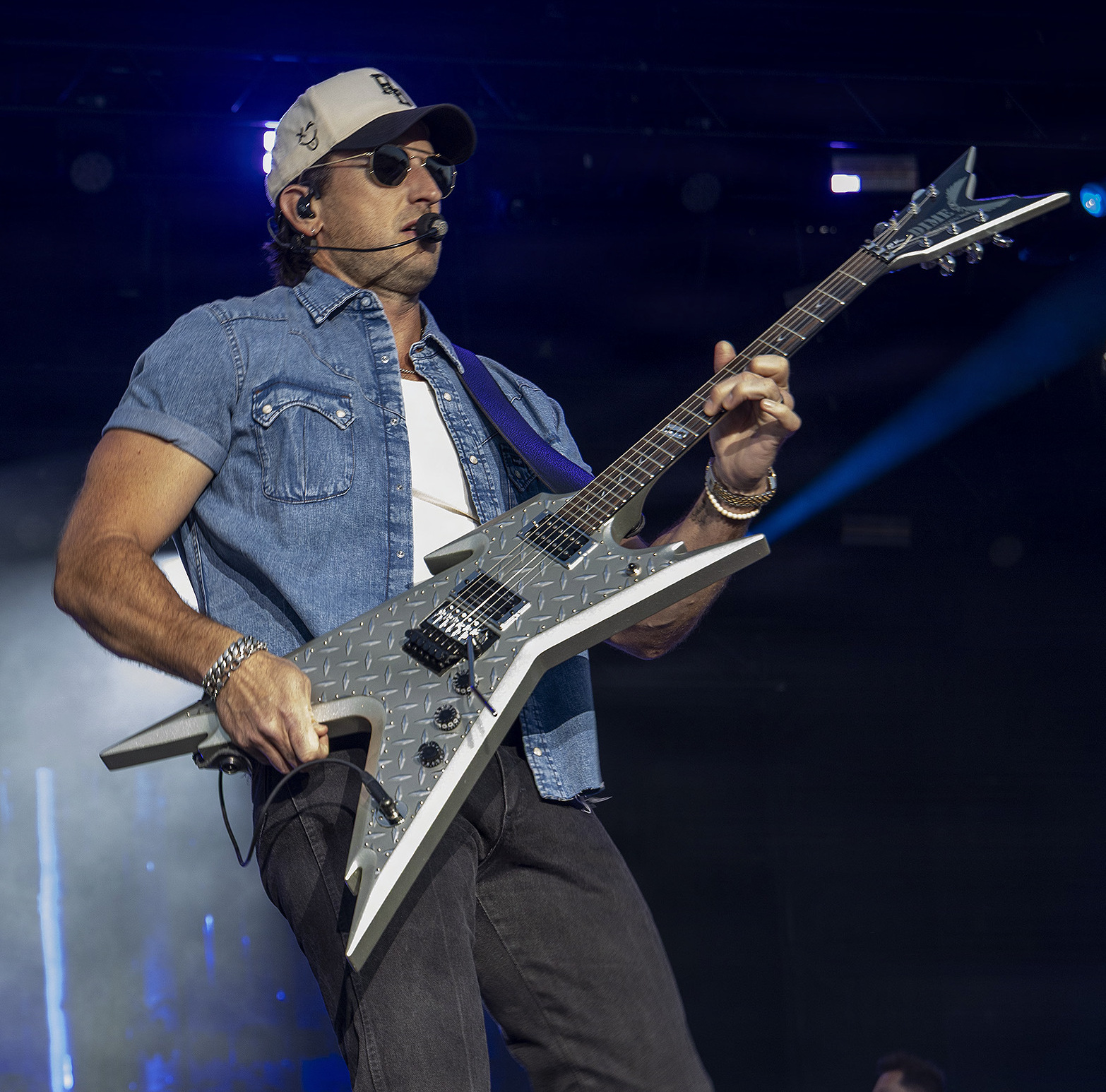
- Dickerson performing in 2026

Background information
- Born: Russell Edward Dickerson; May 7, 1987 (age 39); Union City, Tennessee
- Genres: Country pop; country rock
- Occupation: Singer-songwriter
- Instruments: Vocals; guitar
- Years active: 2011–present
- Label: Triple Tigers
- Spouse: Kailey Seymour (m. 2013)
- Website: www.russelldickerson.com

Russell Edward Dickerson (born May 7, 1987) is an American country pop singer-songwriter from Union City, Tennessee. Dickerson has released four albums through Triple Tigers, and has had five number one singles on the Billboard Country Airplay chart: "Yours", "Blue Tacoma", "Every Little Thing", "Love You Like I Used To", and "Happen to Me".

== Early life ==
Russell Edward Dickerson was born May 7, 1987, in Union City, Tennessee. Dickerson has a sister named Claire Dickerson. He began playing the guitar when he was 15 years old.

== Career ==
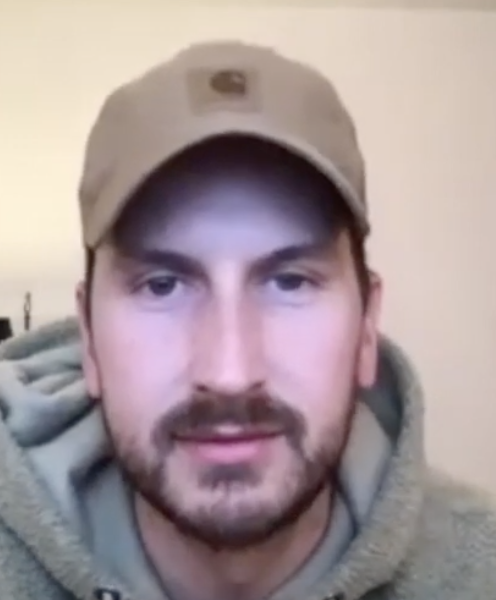
Dickerson in 2020

He earned a bachelor's degree in music from Belmont University and signed with Creative Artists Agency in 2010. In 2011, he released an extended play, Die to Live Again, and opened for David Nail. He toured with Canaan Smith in 2015, and Thomas Rhett in the summer of 2016. Dickerson also joined Billy Currington on the road in 2016.

In 2015, he released the single "Yours," written by Dickerson, Parker Welling, and Casey Brown. It became the title track to his second extended play, released on January 18, 2016, by Dent Records. The EP debuted at number 14 on the Billboard Top Country Albums chart, selling 2,700 copies in its first week of release. It launched at number 2 in the iTunes Country Store and number 8 in all genres. On October 10, 2016, he signed with Triple Tigers Records, which assumed distribution of the single.

In its 39th week on Billboard's Country Airplay chart, Dickerson jumped from number 3 to 1 on the list on January 27, 2018.

The album, Yours was released on October 13, 2017, and premiered at No. 1 on Billboard's Heat Seeker chart. The album peaked at No. 5 on Top Country Albums dated November 4, 2017, with 12,000 equivalent album units in its first week, and includes five songs co-written by Dickerson, containing an acoustic wedding version of the title track "Yours". Due to the popularity of his hit single, he landed on the iTunes Best of 2015 year-end list, TheKnot.com's "Best Wedding Songs of 2016", and Spotify's #SpotifySpotlight 2016; where he later became one of Spotify's RISE artists. Dickerson made his Grand Ole Opry debut on June 3, 2016. An album also titled Yours produced two additional singles in "Blue Tacoma" and "Every Little Thing", which topped the Country Airplay charts as well.

Dickerson's second album, Southern Symphony, came out in late 2020 on Triple Tigers. Its lead single, "Love You Like I Used To", also went to number one on the country music charts. Dickerson and Tyler Hubbard were both featured on Thomas Rhett's 2022 song "Death Row".

On June 27, 2023, Dickerson released his third EP, Three Months Two Streets Down.

On July 31, 2026, Dickerson made a cameo appearance in the Kidz Bop music video of their version of "Happen to Me", becoming the first country artist to appear in a music video with the KIDZ BOP kids.

Dickerson also made an appearance in the 9-1-1: Nashville episode, "In Cold Blood".

== Personal life ==
Dickerson is a devout Christian, having been brought up in the faith as a child. Dickerson married his wife, Kailey Seymour, on May 5, 2013. They have two sons, born in 2020 and 2023. Dickerson and his wife were recognized with the 2026 Angels Among Us Award from St. Jude Children's Research Hospital.

== Discography ==
Russell Dickerson discography
- Studio albums: 4
- EPs: 4
- Singles: 13
- Music videos: 9
- No. 1 singles: 5

=== Studio albums ===
Title	Album details	Peak chart positions			Certifications	Sales
Title	Album details	US	US Country	US Indie	Certifications	Sales
Yours	Release date: October 13, 2017; Label: Triple Tigers	39	5	6	RIAA: Gold	US: 15,600
Southern Symphony	Release date: December 4, 2020; Label: Triple Tigers	134	14	18		
Russell Dickerson	Release date: November 4, 2022; Label: Triple Tigers	138	18	23		
Famous Back Home	Release date: August 22, 2025; Label: Triple Tigers	186	34	31		

=== Extended plays ===
Title	Extended play details	Peak chart positions		
Title	Extended play details	US Country	US Heat	US Indie
Die to Live Again	Release date: January 22, 2011; Label: Self-released	—	—	—
Yours, EP	Release date: January 18, 2016; Label: Dent Records	14	1	9
Three Months Two Streets Down	Release date: June 27, 2023; Label: Triple Tigers	—	—	—
Bones	Release date: August 30, 2024; Label: Triple Tigers	—	—	—
Worth Your Wild	Release date: March 6, 2026; Label: Triple Tigers	—	—	—
"—" denotes releases that did not chart

=== Singles ===
Year	Title	Peak chart positions						Certifications	Sales	Album
Year	Title	US	US Country Songs	US Country Airplay	US Pop	CAN	CAN Country	Certifications	Sales	Album
2011	"That's My Girl"	—	—	—	—	—	—			Non-album singles
2012	"Green Light"	—	—	—	—	—	—			Non-album singles
2017	"Yours"	49	3	1	—	96	2	RIAA: 4× Platinum; RMNZ: Gold	US: 433,000	Yours
2018	"Blue Tacoma"	52	5	1	—	83	2	RIAA: 3× Platinum	US: 87,000	Yours
2018	"Every Little Thing"	50	5	1	—	—	1	RIAA: Platinum	US: 68,000	Yours
2020	"Love You Like I Used To"	31	5	1	—	60	2	RIAA: 2× Platinum	US: 9,000	Southern Symphony
2021	"Home Sweet"	88	21	11	—	—	22	RIAA: Gold		Southern Symphony
2022	"She Likes It" (with Jake Scott)	63	13	16	—	—	31	RIAA: 3× Platinum		Russell Dickerson
2022	"I Remember" (with Cheat Codes)	—	—	—	35	—	—			One Night in Nashville
2022	"God Gave Me a Girl"	81	15	2	—	—	6			Russell Dickerson
2024	"Bones"	—	—	36	—	—	—			Famous Back Home
2025	"Happen to Me"	28	6	1	23	40	1	RIAA: 3× Platinum		Famous Back Home
2025	"Worth Your Wild"	99	30	10	—	—	33			Famous Back Home
"—" denotes releases that did not chart

=== Music videos ===
Year	Title	Director
2011	"That's My Girl"	—N/a
2015	"Yours"	Kailey Dickerson
2018	"Blue Tacoma"	Toben Seymour and Kailey Dickerson
2018	"Every Little Thing"	Ben Skipworth
2020	"Love You Like I Used To"	Toben Seymour and Kailey Dickerson
2021	"Home Sweet"	
2022	"She Likes It" (with Jake Scott)	
2023	"God Gave Me a Girl"	
2024	"Bones"	Daniella Mason
2025	"Happen to Me"	Daniella Mason

== Tours ==
Headlining

- RussellMania Tour (2025)

Supporting

- David Nail (2011)
- Canaan Smith (2015)
- Billy Currington (2016)
- Home Team Tour (2017) (select dates) with Thomas Rhett
- Life Changes Tour (2018) (select dates) with Thomas Rhett
- Summer Plays on Tour (2018) with Lady A and Darius Rucker
- Very Hot Summer Tour (2019) with Thomas Rhett
- Worldwide Beautiful Tour (2020) with Kane Brown
- Locked Up Tour (2024) with Sam Hunt
