= Yours (Russell Dickerson song) =

Single by Russell Dickerson

from the album Yours
- Released: July 23, 2015
- Genre: Country pop
- Length: 3:36
- Label: Triple Tigers
- Songwriters: Russell Dickerson; Parker Welling; Casey Brown
- Producer: Casey Brown

Russell Dickerson singles chronology
"Green Light" (2012)	"Yours" (2015)	"Blue Tacoma" (2018)

Music video
- "Yours" on YouTube

"Yours" is a song recorded by American country music singer Russell Dickerson for his debut studio album of the same name (2017). Dickerson co-wrote the song with Parker Welling and its producer, Casey Brown. The song was first released independently to digital retailers and online streaming services on July 23, 2015. After Dickerson signed to the then-newly created record label Triple Tigers, he released the single to American country radio on April 24, 2017.

"Yours" received generally positive reviews from music critics, and in 2016 it was named the top new wedding song of the year by The Knot. The song became a minor sleeper hit in the United States, entering the Billboard Country Airplay chart in May 2017, one year and ten months after its initial release. As of 2026, "Yours" has sold over four million copies and is certified four-times platinum by the RIAA.

== Critical reception ==
Billy Dukes of Taste of Country wrote that "strong lyrics and a professional approach round out a great vocal performance". Maggie Seaver of The Knot wrote that "Yours" is "sweet, powerful and straight from the heart", making it "everything a first dance song should be". Chuck Dauphin of Sounds Like Nashville named "Yours" the highlight of the EP, writing that Dickerson "proves himself to be a vocalist of strength here" and "definitely hits the mark" with the track.

The song placed at number one on The Knot's 2016 list of top new wedding songs.

== Commercial performance ==
"Yours" was the seventy-eighth best-selling country song in the United States for the week of August 24, 2015. It sold 5,000 copies in its first two weeks. The song debuted and peaked at number 43 on the official Billboard Country Digital Songs chart, the sales component of the Hot Country Songs chart, dated October 3, 2015. By November 2016, the song had sold over 125,000 copies in the United States. In April 2017, Nash Country Weekly reported that "Yours" had been streamed over 30 million times. Upon its release as a radio single in 2017, "Yours" entered the Country Airplay chart dated May 13, 2017 at number 57. It reached number one on the chart dated January 27, 2018. The single was certified Gold by the Recording Industry Association of America on August 8, 2017, Platinum on January 18, 2018, and 2× multi-Platinum on March 29, 2019. As of March 2018, the song has sold 433,000 copies in the US.

== Music video ==
An accompanying music video was directed by Dickerson's wife, Kailey Dickerson, and produced on an approximate budget of six dollars. It was filmed through the back hatch of the Dickersons' SUV as a friend drove the vehicle down a road in west Nashville, Tennessee, while Russell walked behind. They were originally "just shooting test footage", but after a storm that arrived shortly after filming began gave the video a unique effect, Dickerson stuck with the concept. The video was shot in black and white to prevent the vehicle's brake lights from casting a red glow on Dickerson and compromising the visual. The video premiered on Dickerson's YouTube channel on June 29, 2015.

== Charts ==
=== Weekly charts ===
Chart (2017–2018)	Peak position
Canada Hot 100 (Billboard)	96
Canada Country (Billboard)	2
US Billboard Hot 100	49
US Country Airplay (Billboard)	1
US Hot Country Songs (Billboard)	3

=== Year-end charts ===
Chart (2017)	Position
US Hot Country Songs (Billboard)	55

Chart (2018)	Position
US Country Airplay (Billboard)	25
US Hot Country Songs (Billboard)	31
US Radio Songs (Billboard)	64

== Certifications and sales ==
Region	Certification	Certified units/sales
United States (RIAA)	4× Platinum	433,000

== Release history ==
Country	Date	Format	Label	Ref.
United States	July 23, 2015	Digital download	Russell Dickerson	
United States	July 23, 2015	Streaming	Russell Dickerson	
Worldwide	January 18, 2016	Digital download (as part of Yours EP)	Dent	
United States	April 24, 2017	Country radio	Triple Tigers	
