= Hallelujah Nights =

Studio album by Lanco
- Released: January 19, 2018
- Genre: Country
- Length: 40:41
- Label: Arista Nashville
- Producer: Jay Joyce

Singles from Hallelujah Nights
- 1. "Long Live Tonight" Released: April 15, 2016; 2. "Greatest Love Story" Released: March 6, 2017; 3. "Born to Love You" Released: January 29, 2018

Hallelujah Nights is the debut studio album by American country music band Lanco. It was released on January 19, 2018 via Arista Nashville. The album includes the singles "Long Live Tonight", "Greatest Love Story", and "Born to Love You".

== Critical reception ==
The album received three out of five stars from Stephen Thomas Erlewine of AllMusic, who wrote that the band is "designed for mass appeal, so it's fortunate that Hallelujah Nights is built for the long haul: its hooks are sturdy, the production gleams, and the quintet is amiable and ingratiating."

== Commercial performance ==
The album debuted at No. 1 on Billboard's Top Country Albums, with 13,000 copies (19,000 album equivalent units total) sold in the first week. As of January 2018, the album has sold 47,900 copies in the United States.

== Track listing ==
No.	Title	Writer(s)	Length
1.	"Born to Love You"	Brandon Lancaster; Ross Copperman; Ashley Gorley; Josh Osborne	3:50
2.	"Long Live Tonight"	Lancaster; Jason Reeves	3:44
3.	"Pick You Up"	Lancaster; Jeremy Spillman; Ben West	2:56
4.	"Greatest Love Story"	Lancaster	3:42
5.	"We Do"	Lancaster	3:27
6.	"Trouble Maker"	Lancaster; Jay Joyce; Spillman	2:47
7.	"Singin' at the Stars"	Lancaster; Spillman	4:53
8.	"Win You Over"	Lancaster	3:16
9.	"So Long (I Do)"	Lancaster; Joyce; Melissa Fuller	2:59
10.	"Middle of the Night"	Lancaster	3:09
11.	"Hallelujah Nights"	Lancaster; Joyce; Spillman	5:58
Total length:			40:41

== Personnel ==
Adapted from AllMusic

=== Lanco ===
- Chandler Baldwin - bass guitar, background vocals
- Jared Hampton - banjo, Hammond B-3 organ, keyboards, mandolin, background vocals
- Tripp Howell - drums, background vocals
- Brandon Lancaster - acoustic guitar, lead vocals, background vocals
- Eric Steedly - electric guitar, background vocals

=== Additional Musicians ===
- Fred Eltringham - drums, percussion
- Jason Hall - background vocals
- Jaxon Hargrove - acoustic guitar, vibraphone, background vocals
- Jay Joyce - bass guitar, clapping, dobro, Fender Rhodes, acoustic guitar, electric guitar, Hammond B-3 organ, keyboards, percussion, programming, vibraphone, background vocals
- Michael Joyce - bass guitar
- Mickey Raphael - harmonica
- Paul Simmons - drums
- Jeremy Spillman - background vocals
- Tiffany Trotter - spoken word

== Charts ==
=== Weekly charts ===
Chart (2018)	Peak position
US Billboard 200	20
US Top Country Albums (Billboard)	1

=== Year-end charts ===
Chart (2018)	Position
US Top Country Albums (Billboard)	33

== Certifications ==
Region	Certification	Certified units/sales
United States (RIAA)	Gold	500,000^{‡}
^{‡} Sales+streaming figures based on certification alone.
