= She Likes It =

Single by Russell Dickerson featuring Jake Scott

from the album Russell Dickerson
- Released: April 4, 2022
- Genre: Country
- Length: 2:45
- Label: Triple Tigers
- Songwriters: Russell Dickerson; Jake Scott; Josh Kerr
- Producers: Josh Kerr; Jake Scott

Russell Dickerson singles chronology
"Home Sweet" (2021)	"She Likes It" (2022)	"I Remember" (2022)

Music video
- "She Likes It" on YouTube

"She Likes It" is a song co-written and recorded by American country music singer Russell Dickerson. It is the lead single to his third studio album Russell Dickerson, and features guest vocals from Jake Scott.

== Content ==
Russell Dickerson was attending a writing session with Josh Kerr when Kerr suggested that Dickerson listen to music by Jake Scott, an independent country music singer. Because he liked the music, Dickerson then arranged for Scott to join in a songwriting session with the two. Because of the collaboration, Dickerson also chose to include Scott on the song as a backing vocalist. Josh Kerr also produced the track, which Billy Dukes of Taste of Country described as mixing influences of country with trap music.

== Chart performance ==
It peaked at 16 on Country Airplay chart and 13 on the Hot Country Songs chart in late 2022, making it Dickerson's lowest peaking song to date on the former chart. Despite peaking at number 63 on the Hot 100, "She Likes It" qualified for the 2022 year-end Hot 100, making it the third lowest-peaking song ever to make the year-end chart, as "Flower Shops" by Ernest and Morgan Wallen made the year-end despite peaking at number 64 on the Hot 100 and No Pole by Don Toliver made the year-end despite peaking at number 66. In 2026, "She Likes It" was certified triple platinum by the Recording Industry Association of America (RIAA).

=== Weekly charts ===
Weekly chart performance for "She Likes It"
Chart (2022)	Peak position
Canada Country (Billboard)	31
US Billboard Hot 100	63
US Country Airplay (Billboard)	16
US Hot Country Songs (Billboard)	13

=== Year-end charts ===
2022 year-end chart performance for "She Likes It"
Chart (2022)	Position
US Billboard Hot 100	91
US Country Airplay (Billboard)	60
US Hot Country Songs (Billboard)	16

== Certifications ==
Certifications for "She Likes It"
Region	Certification	Certified units/sales
United States (RIAA)	3× Platinum	3,000,000^{‡}
^{‡} Sales+streaming figures based on certification alone.
